= Maryborough Fire Brigade Board =

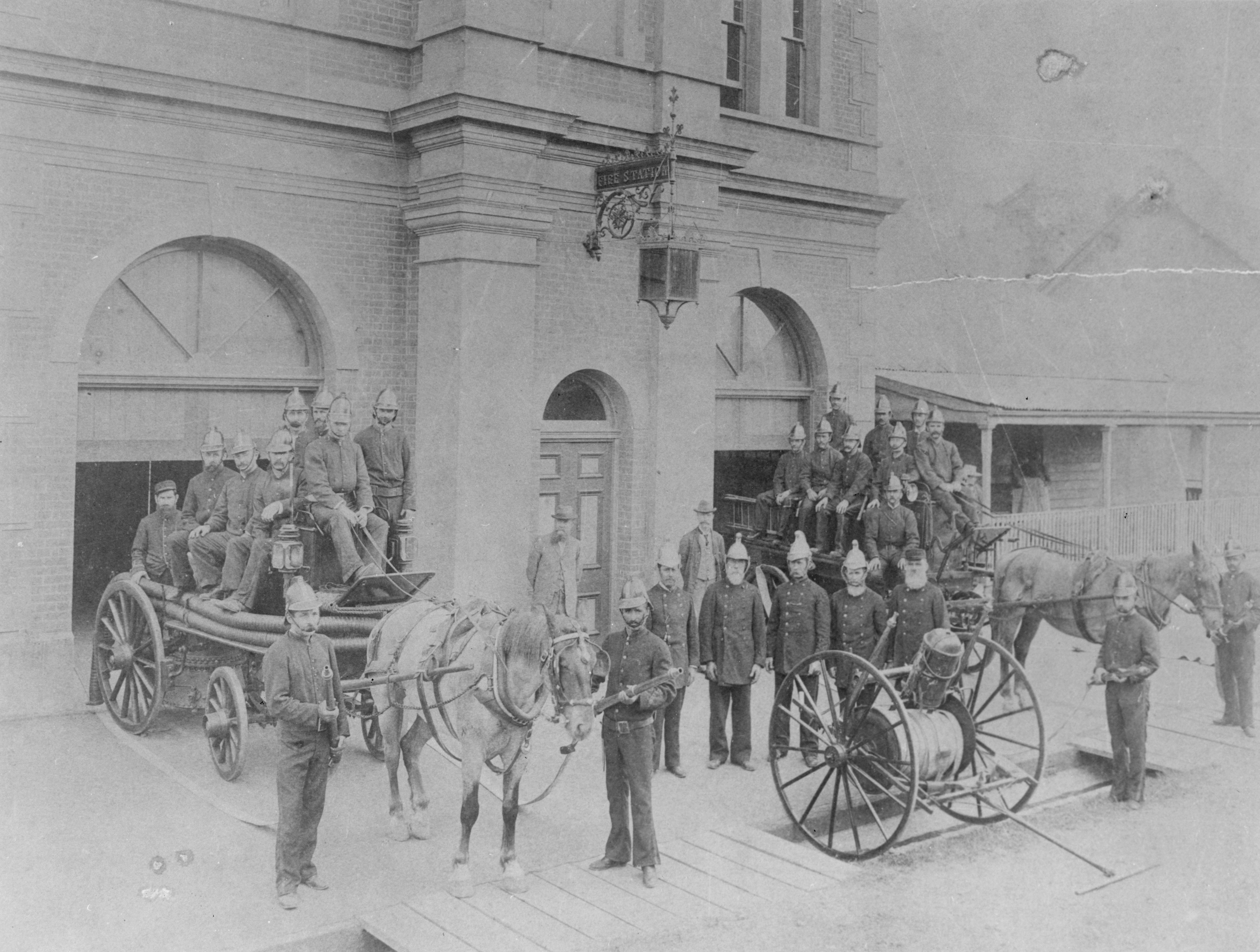
Maryborough Fire Station with appliances ca. 1890

The Maryborough Fire Brigade Board of Maryborough, Queensland was the first fire brigade in Queensland, Australia, outside of the capital city of Brisbane.

In the early days of settlement in Maryborough there were a number of major fires in the town. "These fires were all extremely destructive, primarily because of a lack of any efficient fire services, the lack of a good water supply and the frailty of wooden constructions." The only way to fight a fire was for men to form a bucket brigade. In most cases the buildings weren't saved. Maryborough's largest and most destructive fire in 1876 destroyed 12 premises in the main business district and provided the major impetus for the development of a fire brigade.

In July 1882 the Maryborough Municipal Council allocated funds to purchase fire fighting equipment and made land available in Lennox Street, near the corner of Kent Street, for the storage of the equipment. The firemen were all volunteers, paid two shillings an hour when attending a fire and one shilling and six pence for attending drills which were held fortnightly. By 1884 there were two other fire brigades in Queensland, both in Brisbane.

Prior to the construction of the first fire station, the bells of St Paul's Church of England, which could be heard all over the town, were used as the fire alarm and also to alert the firemen that they were needed to attend a fire. In 1888 the first fire station in Maryborough was erected in Adelaide Street. This structure included a high tower from which a fire watch was kept. When the watchman saw a fire he rang a bell. The number of times he rang the bell identified which part of the town the fire was in. The bell was no longer used after 1922 because telephones had become more common. The building was dismantled in 1942 because it was in a state of disrepair and considered dangerous. In 1951 a new fire station at the corner of Alice and Lennox Streets was opened. This fire station is still in use today.

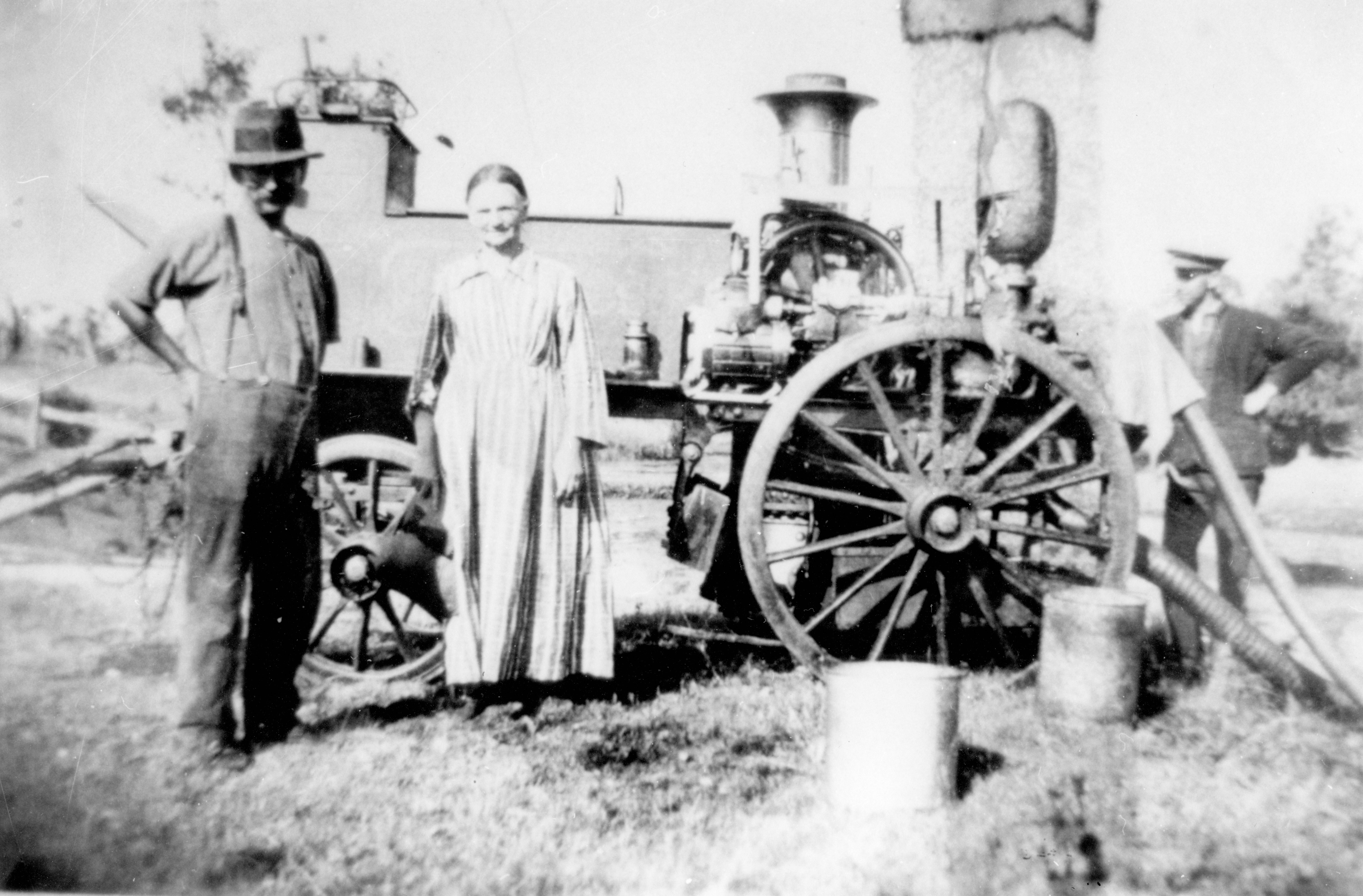
Steam-powered fire engine, Maryborough Queensland ca. 1890

The equipment first used by the Maryborough Fire Brigade Board was very basic. They used a two-wheeled trolley on a frame, which they had to pull to the site of the fire themselves. The trolley contained a hand pump, a water barrel and a large hose and reel. By 1885 the Maryborough Fire Brigade Board had purchased the best fire-fighting equipment available. It included a horse-drawn vehicle which carried men, hoses, axes and other equipment and an expensive horse-drawn steam-powered pump that had been built in England. This machine was named "Progress" because it was the most modern machine of its type in Australia at that time.

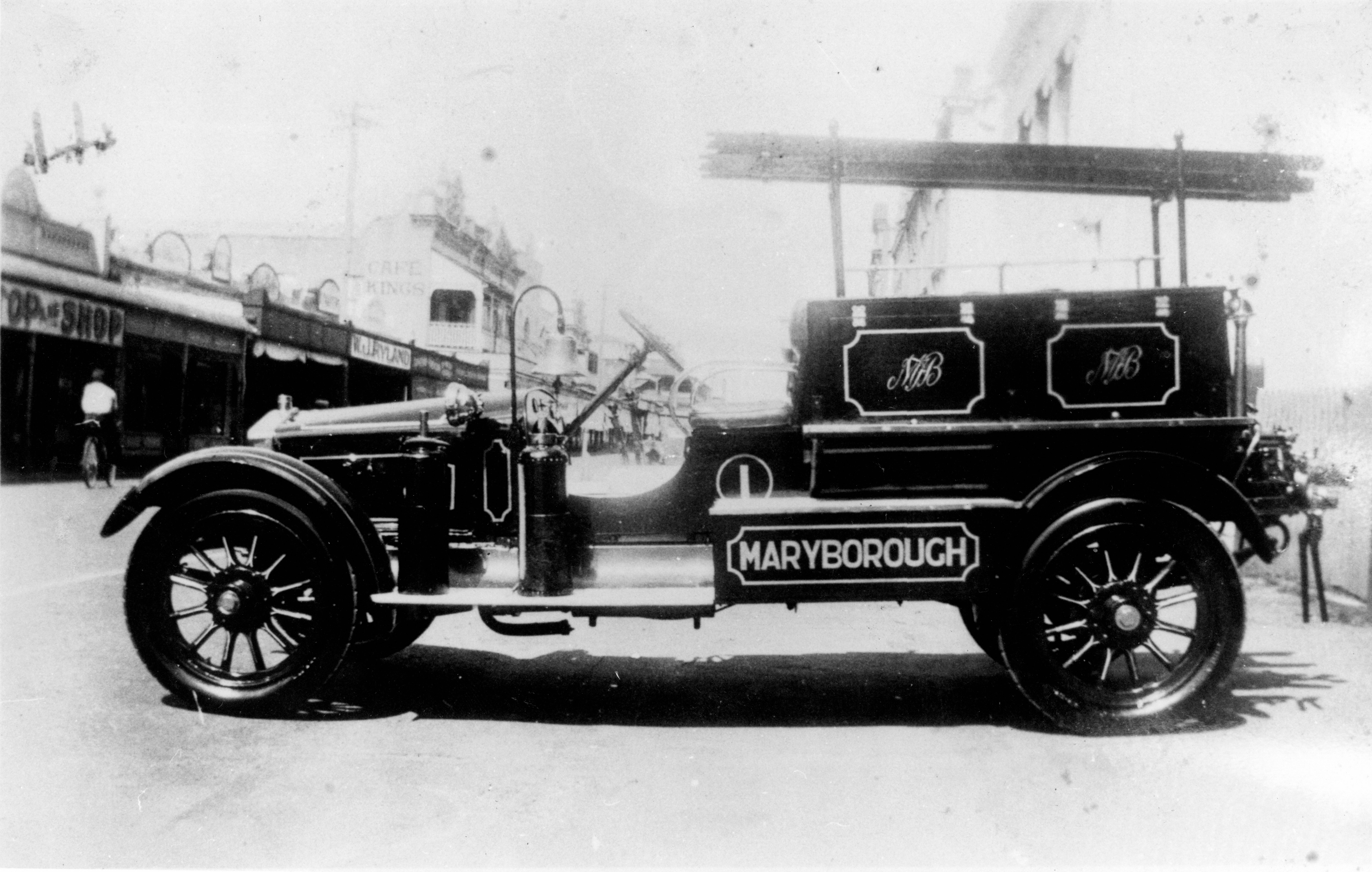
First motorised fire engine in Maryborough, Queensland ca. 1925

As cars became popular the Maryborough Fire Brigade Board decided that they should have a self-propelled fire engine. These could not be bought and had to be made from a car. In 1921 the Fire Brigade Board purchased a second-hand 1913 Alldays and Onions Touring Car. These quaint sounding vehicles were actually made in England up until 1921. It took the Fire Brigade Board two years to convert the car to a fire engine and when it was finished they painted No. 1 on it as it was Maryborough's very first self-propelled fire engine. Unfortunately when the call was received for it to attend its first fire it had to stay in the shed because it was found to have a flat tyre. No. 1 Fire Engine went on to provide long and good service for the city. The only part left of this engine is a small red painted door that is held at a museum in Childers, while Olds Engine House in North Street, Maryborough has in its display a whistle from the old steam engine that No. 1 replaced.
