= Wharf Street Shop, Maryborough =

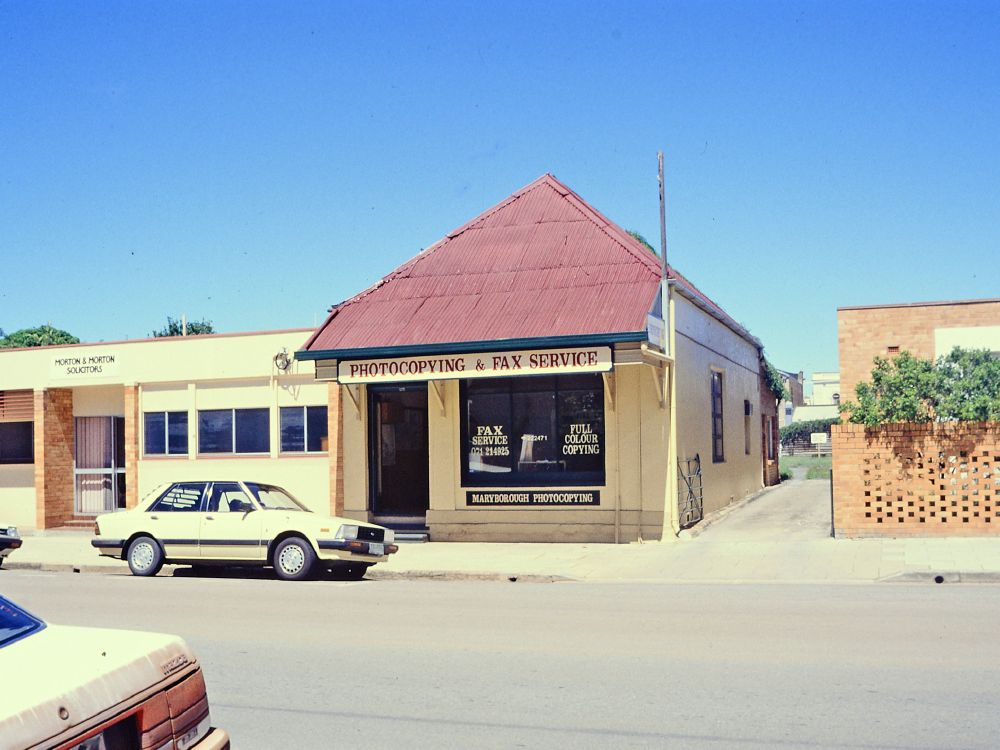
- Wharf Street Shop, 1994

- Location within Queensland Location within Australia
- 25.5382°S 152.7044°E
- Location: 134 Wharf Street, Maryborough, Fraser Coast Region, Queensland, Australia

History
- Design period: 1840s–1860s (mid-19th century)
- Built: 1869

Queensland Heritage Register
- Official name: Shop, 134 Wharf Street, Maryborough, Shop, Wharf Street
- Type: state heritage (built)
- Designated: 21 October 1992
- Reference no.: 600720
- Significant period: 1860s (fabric)
- Significant components: toilet block/earth closet/water closet

Wharf Street Shop is a heritage-listed shop at 134 Wharf Street, Maryborough, Fraser Coast Region, Queensland, Australia. It was built in 1869. It was added to the Queensland Heritage Register on 21 October 1992.

== History ==
The shop at 134 Wharf Street was built in 1869 as one of three shops in the midst of the wharf precinct of the Port of Maryborough.

Settlement at Maryborough commenced in September 1847 when George Furber established a woolstore on the south bank of the Mary River at the head of navigation. He was followed in June 1848 by ET Aldridge and Henry and RE Palmer, who established their own wharves on the opposite riverbank, at a location now known as the original Maryborough town site at Baddow. In 1850 a new town site was surveyed to the east, at a downstream position which provided better access for shipping. The first sale of land at this new site occurred in 1852, but most residents did not shift to the current centre of Maryborough until 1855 and 1856. Maryborough was gazetted a Port of Entry in 1859 and was proclaimed a municipality (the Borough of Maryborough) in 1861. During the 1860s and 1870s it flourished as the principal port for the nearby Gympie goldfield and as an outlet for timber and sugar. The establishment of manufacturing plants and primary industries sustained growth in the town into the twentieth century.

The small building was originally one of three identical shops with shingle roofs adjoining one another in a row fronting Wharf Street. The other two were located on its eastern side where a small office building is presently located. It is not known whether remnants of the former shops exist under the facade of this building.

The shop at 134 Wharf Street has always been used for small business purposes and has changed hands many times. It continues to operate as a retail store.

== Description ==
The building at 134 Wharf Street is a simple one-storeyed, rendered brick building with a steeply pitched hipped roof clad with corrugated metal sheeting. A small awning at the front of the building is incorporated into the principal roof and is supported on timber brackets. According to the reports of local people there is a shingle roof extant underneath the corrugated iron.

The frontage of the shop consists of a large glass window on the western side with the entrance, a double, panelled, timber door accessed by two steps, on the eastern side. The front door has a large fanlight above with vertical iron security bars. The front portion of the interior is one large, open, room. A brick extension at the rear of the building is accessed by a narrow hall along the eastern side which leads off to two rooms to the right and then to the rear exit door.

The shop is abutted by a lowset brick office building to the eastern side and is bounded by a driveway to the western side which leads around to the back of the building where two external toilets are situated. At the rear of the building the land backs on to the back blocks of other properties creating what looks like a common space.

The building is of a simple construction with no decorative features.

== Heritage listing ==
The shop at 134 Wharf Street was listed on the Queensland Heritage Register on 21 October 1992 having satisfied the following criteria.

The place is important in demonstrating the evolution or pattern of Queensland's history.

The shop is important as one of the earliest surviving shops in the Wharf Street area, predating the late nineteenth century development which saw many of the earlier structures enlarged. It demonstrates the early development of the commercial precinct which occurred in response to the establishment of the port in the Mary River near Wharf Street.

The place is important in demonstrating the principal characteristics of a particular class of cultural places.

The design of the shop is characteristic of mid-nineteenth century shop design, with entrance door and window on the principal facade.

The place is important because of its aesthetic significance.

The shop has aesthetic value for its contribution to the character of Wharf Street which is made up of many 19th century commercial and public buildings creating a coherent streetscape.
