= Maryborough, Queensland =

Maryborough
- City
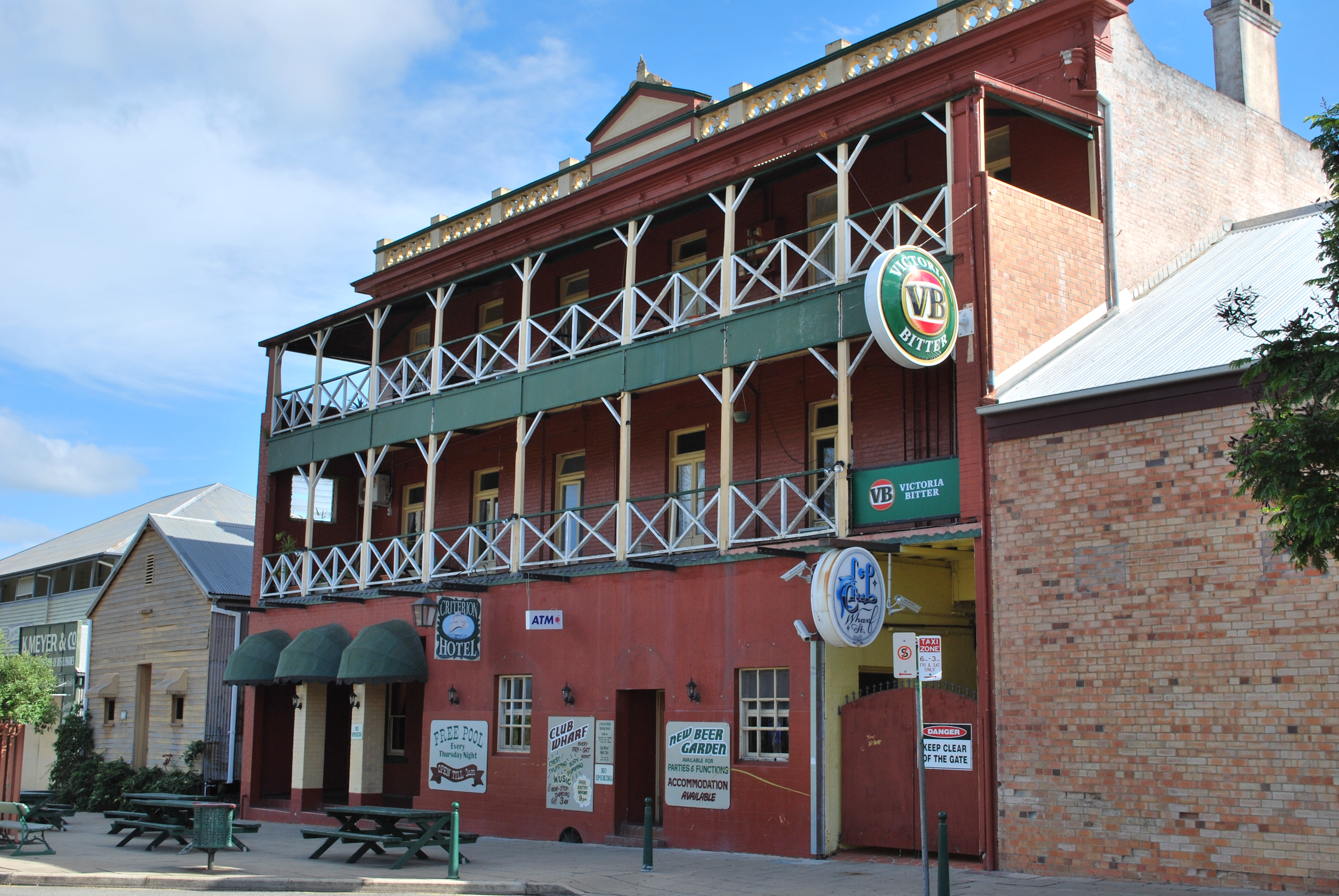
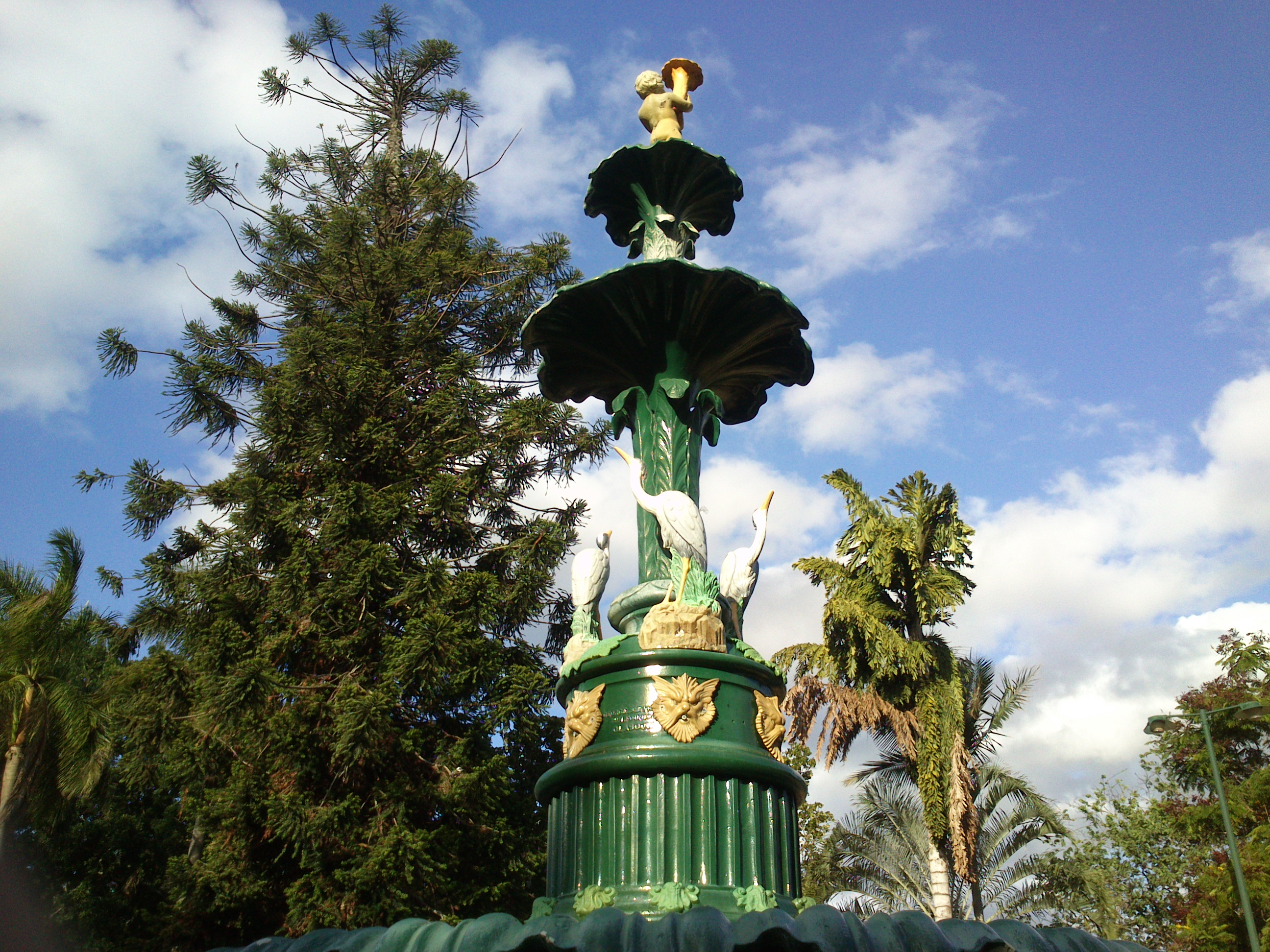
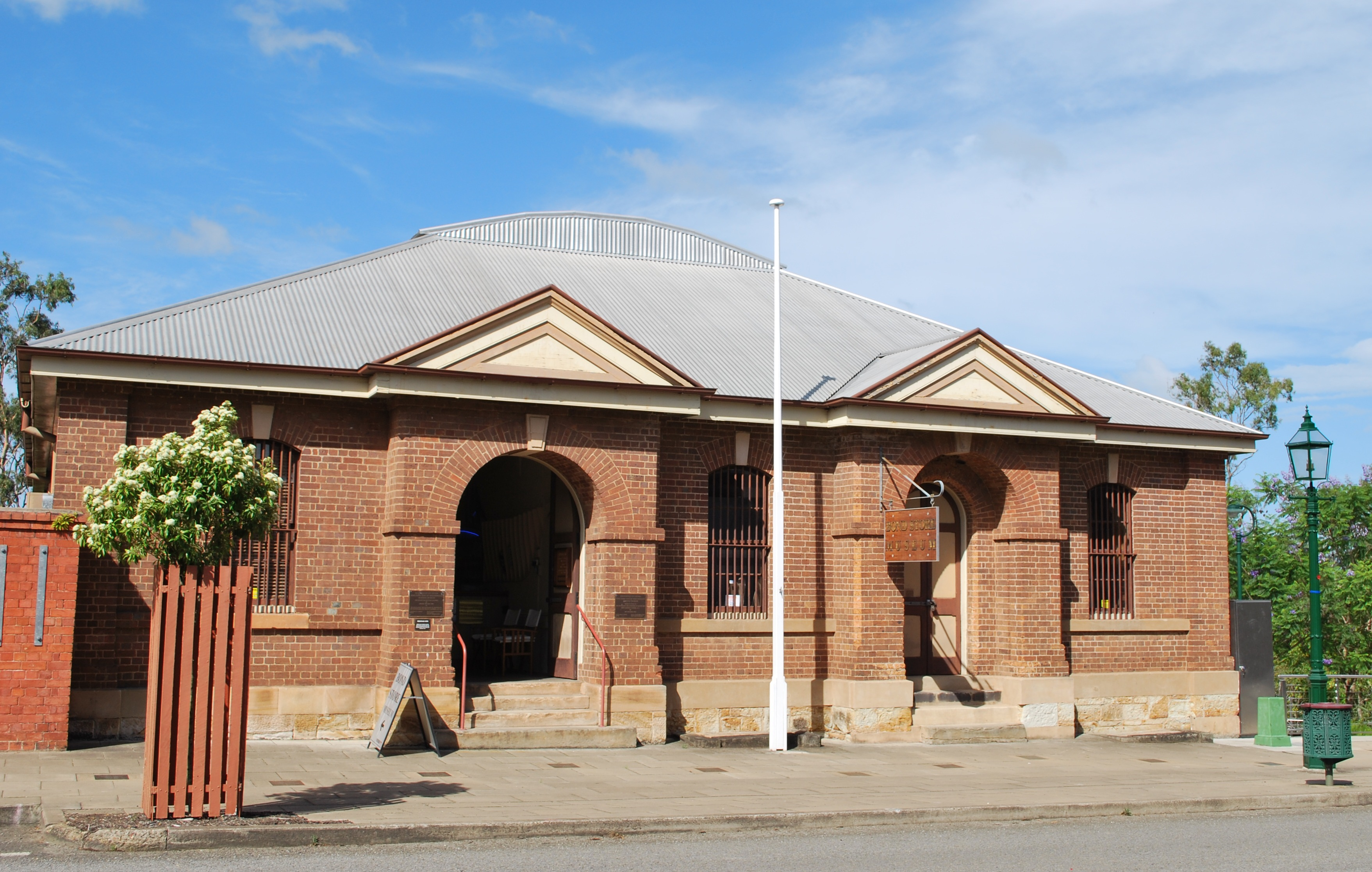
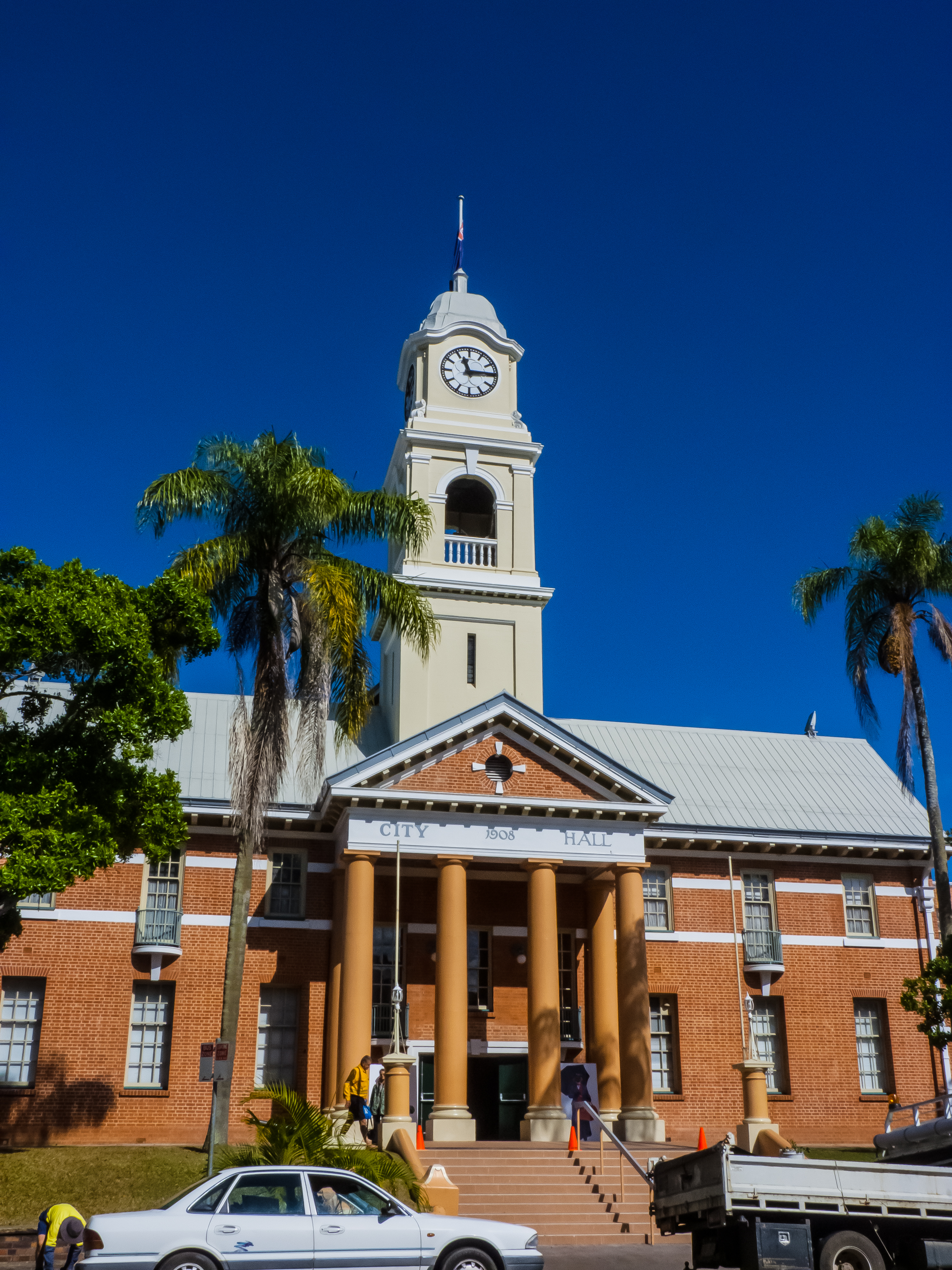
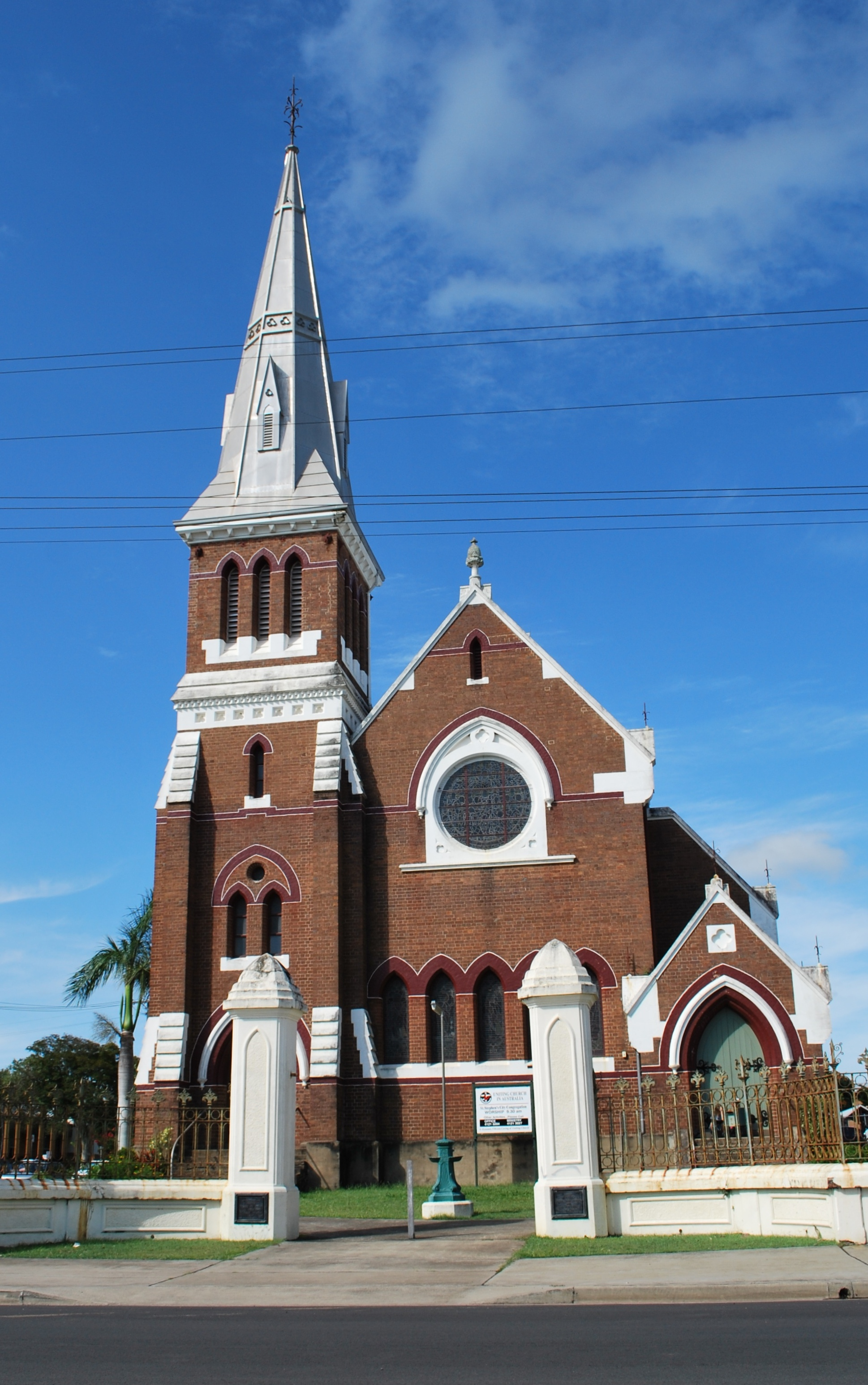
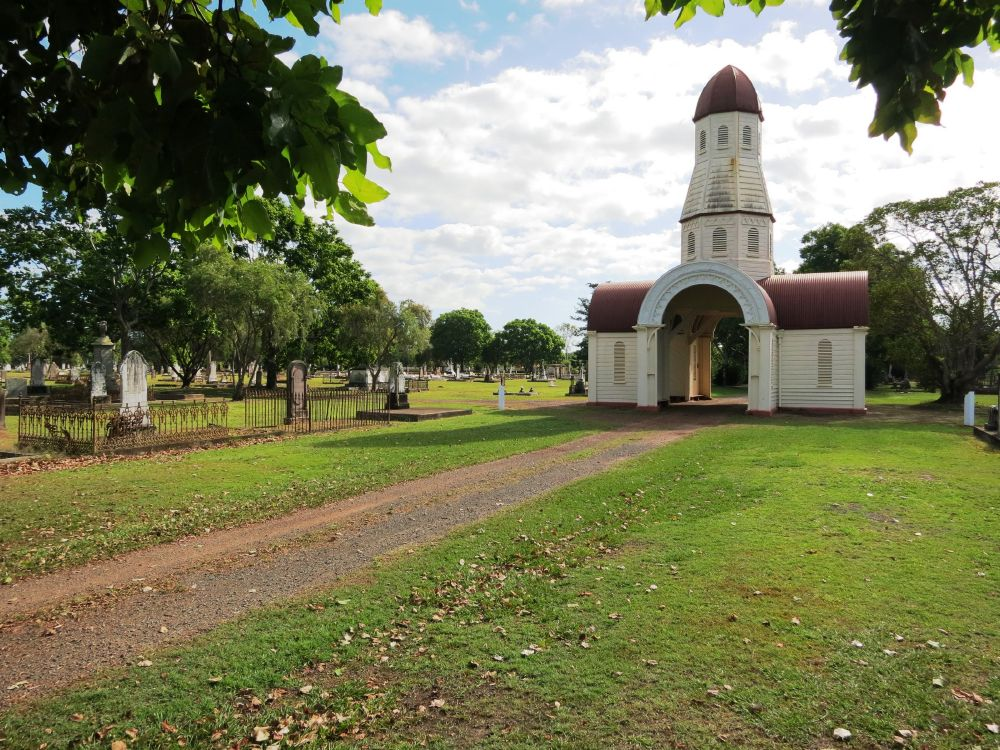
- Portside Quarter Queen's Park Government Bond Store Maryborough City Hall St Stephen's Uniting Church Mortuary Chapel and cemetery

- Coordinates: 25.5375°S 152.7019°E
- Country: Australia
- State: Queensland
- LGA: Fraser Coast Region
- Location: 30.9 km (19.2 mi) SSW of Hervey Bay; 86.6 km (53.8 mi) N of Gympie; 262 km (163 mi) N of Brisbane
- Established: 1847

Government
  - State electorate: Maryborough
  - Federal division: Wide Bay

Area (Significant Urban Area)
  - Total: 170.6 km^{2} (65.9 sq mi)
- Elevation: 11.0 m (36.1 ft)

Population
  - Totals: 27,489 (2021 census)(Significant Urban Area) (54th); 15,287 (2021 census)(Suburb)
  - Density: 161.13/km^{2} (417.33/sq mi)
- Time zone: UTC+10 (AEST)
- Postcode: 4650
- Mean max temp: 26.9 °C (80.4 °F)
- Mean min temp: 15.3 °C (59.5 °F)
- Annual rainfall: 1,155.6 mm (45.50 in)
Localities around Maryborough
Aldershot	St Helens	Island Plantation
Maryborough West	Maryborough	Walkers Point
Tinana	Bidwill	Granville

Maryborough (/ˈmɛərɪbərə/ MARE-ih-bər-ə) is a city in the Fraser Coast Region, Queensland, Australia. In the 2021 census, the suburb of Maryborough had a population of 15,287 people.

== Geography ==
Maryborough is located on the Mary River in Queensland, Australia, approximately 255 kilometres (160 mi) north of the state capital, Brisbane. The city is served by the Bruce Highway. It is closely tied to its neighbour city Hervey Bay which is approximately 30 kilometres (20 mi) northeast. Together they form part of the area known as the Fraser Coast.

The neighbourhood of Baddow is within the west of the suburb near the Mary River. It takes its name from Baddow House, a historic property in the area (25.5269°S 152.6728°E). Baddow railway station (25.5197°S 152.6769°E) and Baddow Island (25.5317°S 152.6747°E) in the Mary River also take their names from the house.

== History ==
=== Original inhabitants, language and culture ===
Evidence of human inhabitation of the Maryborough region stretches back to at least 6,000 years ago. The Gubbi Gubbi (Kabi Kabi) and Batjala (Butchulla) people are the original inhabitants of the region. The Gubbi Gubbi were described as an inland tribe of the Wide Bay–Burnett area, whose lands extend over 3,700 sq. miles and lie west of Maryborough. The northern borders run as far as Childers and Hervey Bay. On the south, they approach the headwaters of the Mary River and Cooroy. Westwards, they reach as far as the Coast Ranges and Kilkivan. The Batjala occupy the more coastal regions including K’gari (Fraser Island).

The Batjala and Gubbi Gubbi speak dialects of the Dippil language, the Batjala dialect being spoken in the Fraser Coast region, while the Gubbi Gubbi dialect is spoken in what is now the Gympie and Sunshine Coast regions.

The escaped convict James Davis lived among various clans of the Gubbi Gubbi.

=== The arrival of the British ===
British navigators Matthew Flinders in 1802 and William Edwardson in 1822 were the first Europeans to take detailed surveys of the Hervey Bay coastline. They both noted that the native population living on its shores appeared numerous. The first British people to live in the region were escaped convicts from the Moreton Bay Penal Settlement. Convicts Richard Parsons and John Graham both briefly lived with local Aboriginals during the late 1820s. James Davis, however, lived with several Gubbi Gubbi clans from 1829 to 1842. He became a member of their society and was given the name Duramboi. In 1842, Andrew Petrie and Henry Stuart Russell sailed up the river known to the Gubbi as the Monoboola (later known as the Mary River) looking for land and timber to exploit. They found Duramboi living with the Ginginbara clan of the Gubbi along its banks at a camp close to where the town of Maryborough is now situated.

=== Colonisation and conflict ===
After these initial explorations, pastoral squatters started to enter the region looking to establish sheep stations. The first of these was Mynarton Joliffe who, under the employment of the prosperous squatter John Eales, overlanded 16,000 sheep and set up the Tiaro property in 1843. Aboriginal resistance was fierce, shepherds and livestock were killed, and Joliffe had to abandon the area within eighteen months. During this time, Commissioner of Crown Lands, Stephen Simpson visited the area and determined that the junction of two waterways (later known as the Mary river and Tinana Creek) would be a suitable place for a township. Squatters started to return to the area in 1847 after John Charles Burnett conducted a more thorough survey of the region.

Maryborough itself was founded in 1847 by George Furber who established a small wool depot on the banks of the river. A year later Edgar Thomas Aldridge with Henry Palmer and his brother Richard E. Palmer constructed several permanent buildings and in 1849 a post office, petty sessions court and police station overseen by John Carne Bidwill opened. Edmund Blucher Uhr established a boiling down facility in 1850 and John George Walker started a boatyard not long after. The site for the township was laid out by the government surveyor H.H. Labatt in 1850 and the first land sales occurred in January 1852. The name Maryborough was derived from the Mary River which itself was named in 1847 after Mary Lennox, the wife of Charles Augustus Fitzroy who was the Governor of New South Wales at the time.

Aboriginal resistance remained determined with numerous Mary River squatters and their shepherds being wounded or killed. Within weeks of his arrival, George Furber was seriously wounded by local Aboriginal people, as were other newly arrived colonists such as Alexander Scott. Furber would later shoot dead the Aboriginal man who tried to kill him outside a store in Maryborough. The body of the man was then taken by the local Aboriginal tribe to a location about half a mile away, where it was cut up, roasted, and eaten.

In November 1850, after receiving intelligence of the murder of a shepherd and the loss of a flock of sheep, the Native Police started to enter the area. Lieutenant Richard Marshall with the assistance of Mary River settlers such as John Murray and Henry Cox Corfield, conducted expeditions to find the stolen sheep. In 1851, the Commandant of the Native Police, Frederick Walker, was called in to apprehend a number of Aboriginal men who had committed criminal acts on the mainland, and were hiding out on K'gari. Walker sailed with three sections of troopers down the Mary River. After landing at K'gari, the men who were guarding the boats saw a group of Aboriginal men in a stolen boat, which was then later captured. Another stolen boat was observed and shot at, with the Aboriginal crew escaping to a nearby island. While the men camped, the Aboriginals tried to ambush them, with two of them killed during the engagements. It was later discovered that the Aboriginals had partly eaten one of the bodies. Another section captured a number of people while another section followed other inhabitants across to the east coast where they escaped into the ocean. In 1856, a Native Police barracks was constructed on the outskirts of the town at Owanyilla. In early 1860, Lieutenant John O'Connell Bligh and his troopers conducted an early morning raid on a group of Aboriginal people, killing at least two and wounding many others, in the streets of Maryborough. The townspeople gave Bligh a sword thanking him for his actions.

By the late 1860s Aboriginal resistance to colonisation in the Maryborough district had been defeated with the survivors existing in poverty as fringe-dwellers. Many of these people were forcibly transferred to an isolation camp on K'gari in the 1890s and later shipped to Far North Queensland to the Yarrabah facility.

=== Sugar ===
The early Maryborough economy was centred around livestock farming, logging of forests, and the boiling down of animal carcasses to make tallow. In the late 1850s the soil along the Mary River was deemed ideal for the cultivation of sugarcane and in 1859 Edgar Thomas Aldridge was able to grow and produce a world-class experimental crop. Seeing the profitable potential, many influential local landholders such as Henry Palmer and John Eaton formed the Maryborough Sugar Company in 1865. Farmers switched to growing cane and the first Mary River sugar refinery, known as the Central Mill, was built in 1867 by Robert Greathead and Frederick Gladwell.

At this time, other sugar plantations in Queensland were importing cheap, sometimes blackbirded labour from islands in the South Pacific. The planters along the Mary River also used this type of labour and the first shipment of 84 South Sea Islander workers arrived in Maryborough in November 1867. They came aboard the schooner Mary Smith, owned by Robert Greathead, with 22 of the labourers being engaged by the Maryborough Sugar Company. Concerns were raised about whether the Islanders on the Mary Smith understood the work contracts and if the pledge to return them would be honoured due to the lack of an interpreter. It was also alleged that the captain sold the Islanders to the colonists for £9 a head, while a missionary noted that the Islanders were unlikely to understand why they were taken.

In 1869, Robert Tooth and Robert Cran bought up a number of plantations in the region and established the Yengarie Sugar Refinery. They became the local dominant sugar manufacturer with the Maryborough Sugar Company becoming insolvent. By the end of the 1870s, Robert Cran and his sons had taken control of operations under the name Cran & Co.

=== Economic and civic expansion ===
An unnamed Catholic School had opened by February 1858. Teaching was undertaken by lay teachers as there were no Catholic religious orders in Maryborough at that time. It closed in 1888.

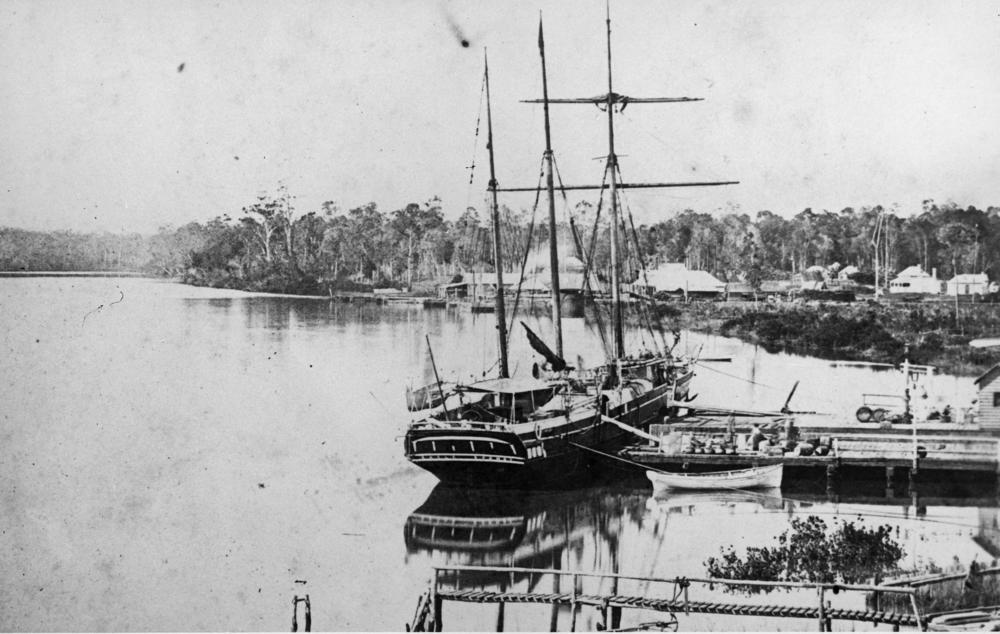
S. S. Eagle

Maryborough was proclaimed a municipality in 1861, and became a city in 1905. During the second half of the 19th-century, the city was a major port of entry for immigrants arriving in Queensland from all parts of the world.

Maryborough Central State School opened in 1862. Circa 1874/75 it separated into Maryborough Central Boys School and Maryborough Central Girls' and Infants' School. In 1878 the Girls' and Infants' School separated into Maryborough Central Girls' School and Maryborough Central Infants' School. On 29 July 1932, Maryborough Central Boys School and Maryborough Central Girls School were closed and combined to become Maryborough Central State School. Maryborough Central Infants State School closed on 12 December 1986.

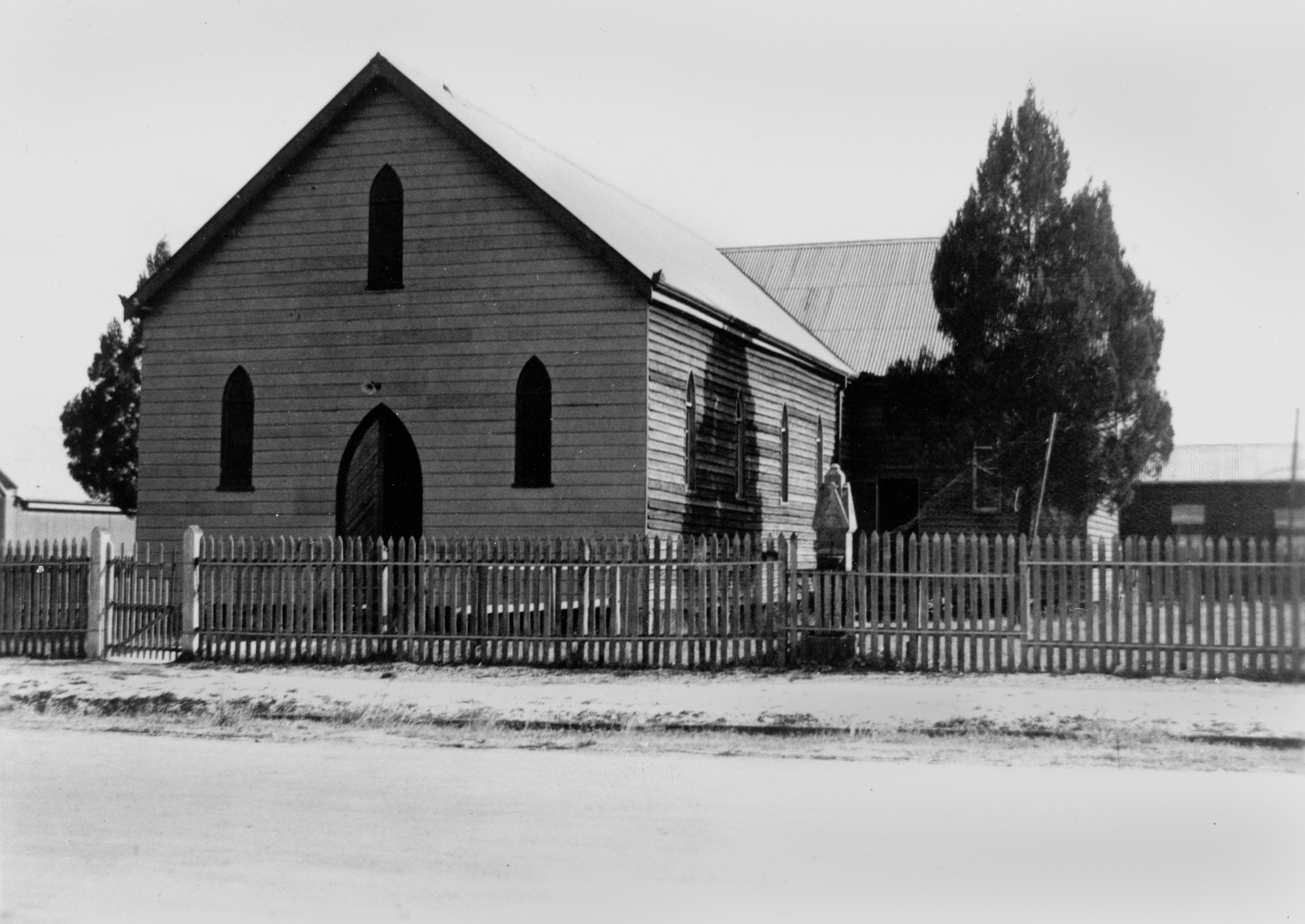
Wesleyan Church, built 1864

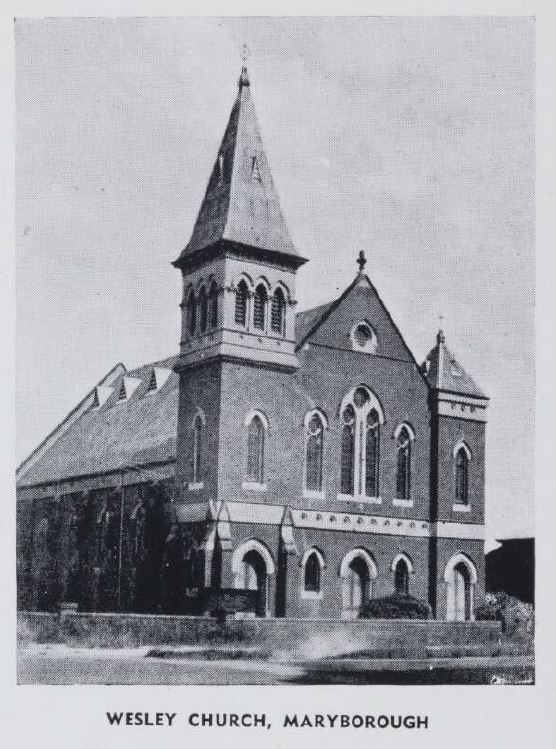
Wesleyan Church, built 1883

On Sunday 18 September 1864, a Wesleyan Methodist Church opened on a 0.5-acre (0.20 ha) site on the eastern corner of Adelaide Street and Alice Street (25.5409°S 152.7000°E). It was a timber building in the Gothic style, capable of seating 200 people on open benches. The architect was Reverend Thomas Holme and the builders were Messrs Hart and Marshall. Prior to the opening of the church, Wesleyan services were initially held in a store in Adelaide Street and then in the Maryborough School of Arts. By August 1882, the church building had become too small and started to show signs of decay, so the southern corner of Adelaide and Alice Street (that is, on the same side of Adelaide Street) was purchased to construct the new church (25.5412°S 152.6997°E). In February 1883, the site of the 1864 church was offered for sale, as the 1864 church was to be relocated to the rear of the new church to be used as a Sunday school hall. The foundation stone for the new church was laid on Tuesday 27 February 1883, and the British ensign was waved from the finial of the new church's spire on Friday 22 June 1883 to signify the completion of the highest point of the building. On Sunday 16 December 1883, the new brick church was officially opened and consecrated, as part of a program of church services, public lectures, tea-meetings, and concerts to celebrate the occasion. The church participated in the 1977 amalgamation that created Uniting Church in Australia. It was demolished some time after 1982.

In July 1870, St Joseph's Catholic School was established in Adelaide Street by Mary MacKillop and her Sisters of St Joseph of the Sacred Heart. The school was for girls and infants, with boys continuing to attend the Catholic school taught by lay teachers. St Joseph's closed in March 1879, as the consequence of a long-running dispute between MacKillop and the Roman Catholic Bishop of Brisbane, James Quinn, over whether the Sisters or the diocese should control the schools. In 1879 Quinn directed MacKillop and her sisters to leave the diocese, despite protests from the laity. In 1880 the Sisters of Mercy arrived in Maryborough and re-opened the school on 1 April 1880 as St Mary's School. St Mary's School expanded to offer secondary school for girls in 1928. In 1978, a desire for co-education was achieved by amalgamating with Sacred Heart College to create two new schools St Mary's Primary School (the primary school for boys and girls) and St Mary's College (the secondary school for boys and girls) which commenced operation in 1979.

St Paul's Anglican Church, Maryborough opened in 1879, replacing an earlier timber church on the same site. The architect was FDG Stanley. The free standing bell tower was added in 1887 as a memorial to Maria Aldridge. A memorial hall was added in 1921; it was designed by POE Hawkes.

Maryborough Boys Grammar opened in 1881 and Maryborough Girls Grammar opened circa 1882. In 1936, the Queensland Department of Education took over both grammar schools and created three schools: Maryborough Boys State Intermediate School, Maryborough Boys State High School, and Maryborough Girls State High and Intermediate School. In 1952 Maryborough Girls State High and Intermediate School were separated into Maryborough Girls State Intermediate School and Maryborough Girls State High School. In 1964 the two boys' schools amalgamated to become Maryborough Boys State High School and the two girls' schools amalgamated to form Maryborough Girls State High School. In 1974 the boys' and girl's High Schools were amalgamated to form Maryborough State High School.

The first section of what is now the North Coast Line opened on 6 August 1881, connecting the mining town of Gympie to the river port at Maryborough and followed the Mary River valley. The Queensland Government was under constant pressure to reduce expenditure, and so despite the potential for the line to be part of a future main line, the line was constructed to pioneer standards with minimal earthworks, a sinuous alignment and 17.4 kg/m (35 lb/yd) lightweight rails.

Coal had been discovered at Burrum, 25 kilometres (16 mi) north of Maryborough, and a line was constructed to serve the mine, opening in 1883. The line was extended to Bundaberg in 1888 so coal could be shipped there as well. When the Burrum line was built, it junctioned from the Maryborough line at Baddow, 3 kilometres (1.9 mi) from the station, creating a triangular junction, with platforms ultimately being provided on all three sides. Maryborough railway station was situated immediately adjacent to the commercial centre of the city, and converting it into a through station would have been prohibitively expensive.

Albert State School opened on 9 July 1883.

In 1885, a Baptist church opened in Maryborough.

Newtown Maryborough State School opened on 19 July 1886, but it was renamed Maryborough West State School later that same year.

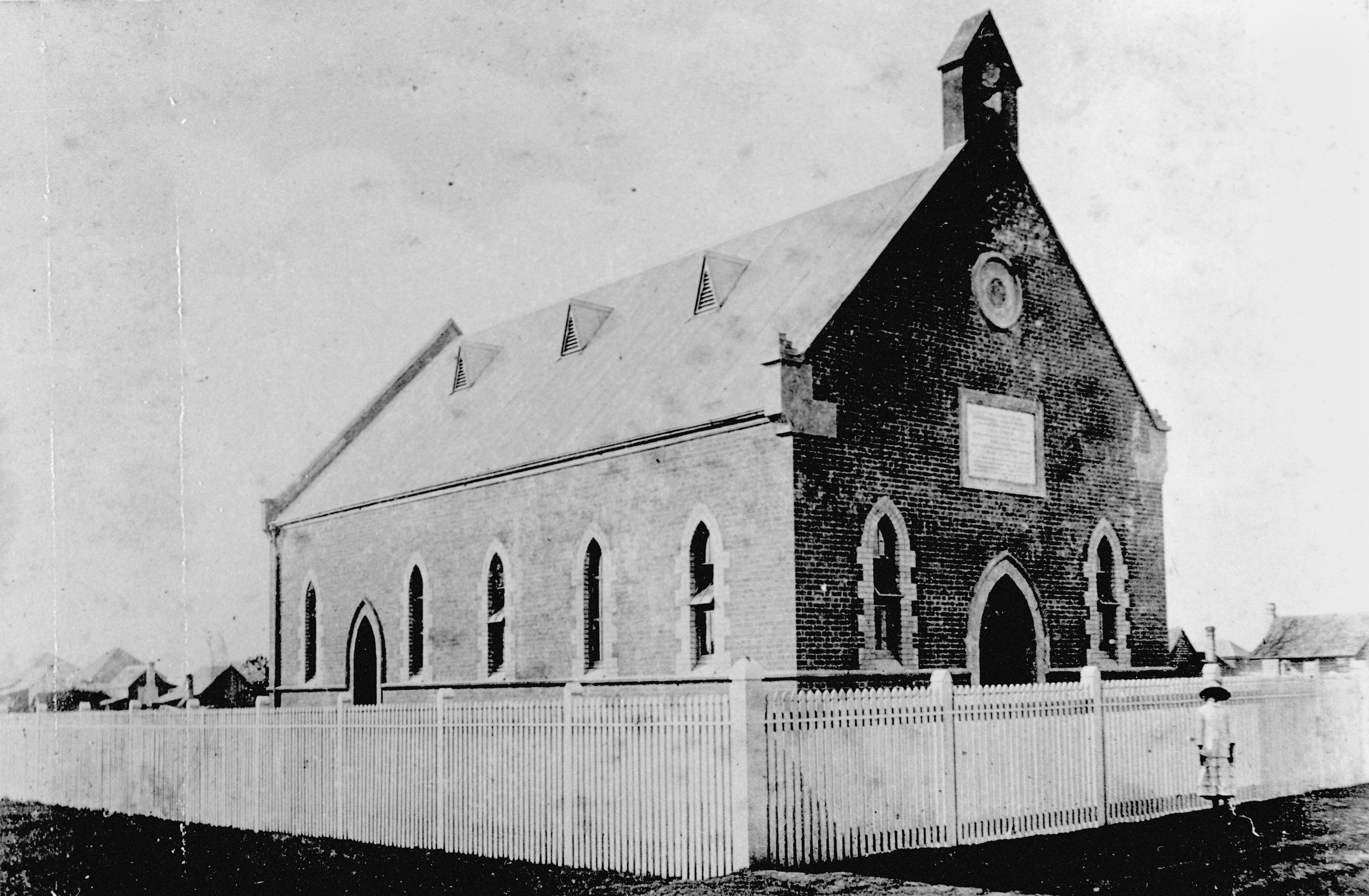
St Thomas' Church of England

On Friday 7 October 1887, Archbishop William Webber laid the foundation stone of St Thomas' Anglican Church and School in Pallas Street and Theresa Street. On Wed 21 December 1887 St Thomas Anglican Church was officially opened at 197 Pallas Street (25.5256°S 152.6990°E). The church was erected by Edgar Thomas Aldridge, of Baddow House in memory of his wife Maria who died on 17 March 1886. Its closure on 29 October 2005 was approved by Assistant Bishop Appleby.

On 3 September 1888, the Christian Brothers established Sacred Heart College for older boys, leaving St Mary's School to educate all younger children and the older girls (with no further need for the lay Catholic school). Sacred Heart College closed in 1978, due to a move to co-education achieved by amalgamating with St Mary's School to create two new schools St Mary's Primary School (the primary school for boys and girls) and St Mary's College (the secondary school for boys and girls) which commenced operation in 1979.

Sunbury State School opened on 18 January 1891.

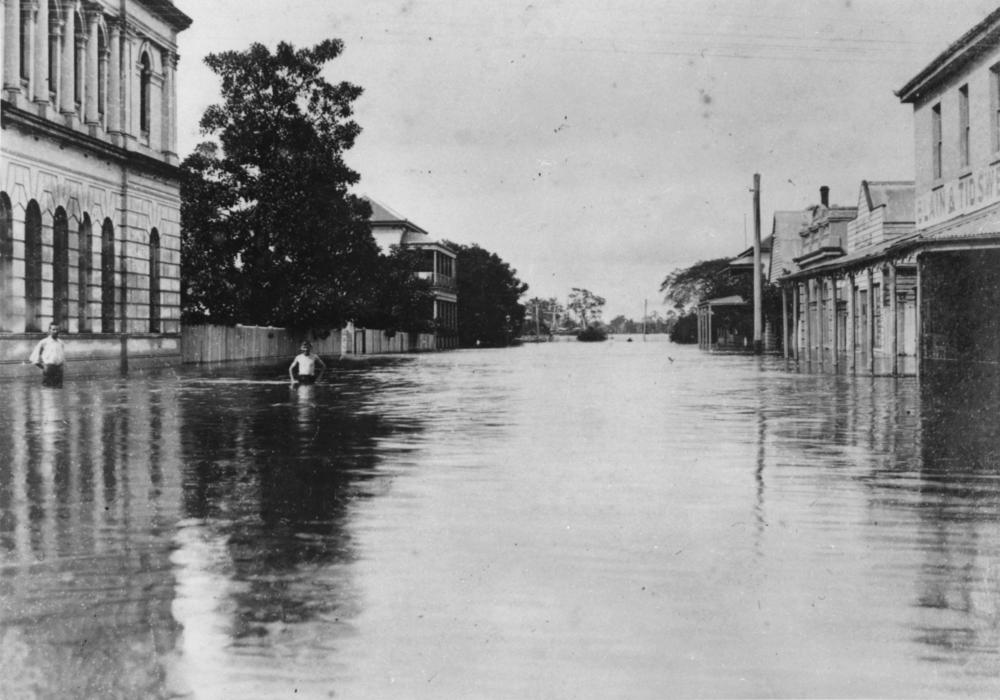
Flooding of the Mary River, 1893

When through trains commenced running from Brisbane to Bundaberg and beyond, trains ran into Maryborough, a fresh steam locomotive was attached to the other end of the train, and it then departed. Once diesel locomotives were introduced, there was no need to replace engines, and through trains paused at Baddow on the 3rd leg of the triangular junction before proceeding north. A one carriage connecting service was provided from Maryborough to meet the through train at Baddow, and then return. As trains became longer, the platform on the 3rd leg was not of sufficient length, and the trains would stop on the platform on the line to Maryborough, having to reverse out of, or back into, the platform before proceeding further, adding about 15 minutes to the journey. The situation was finally resolved with the opening of the Maryborough West bypass in 1988. Point Lookout Croquet Club was established in 1898, making it the oldest croquet club in Queensland.

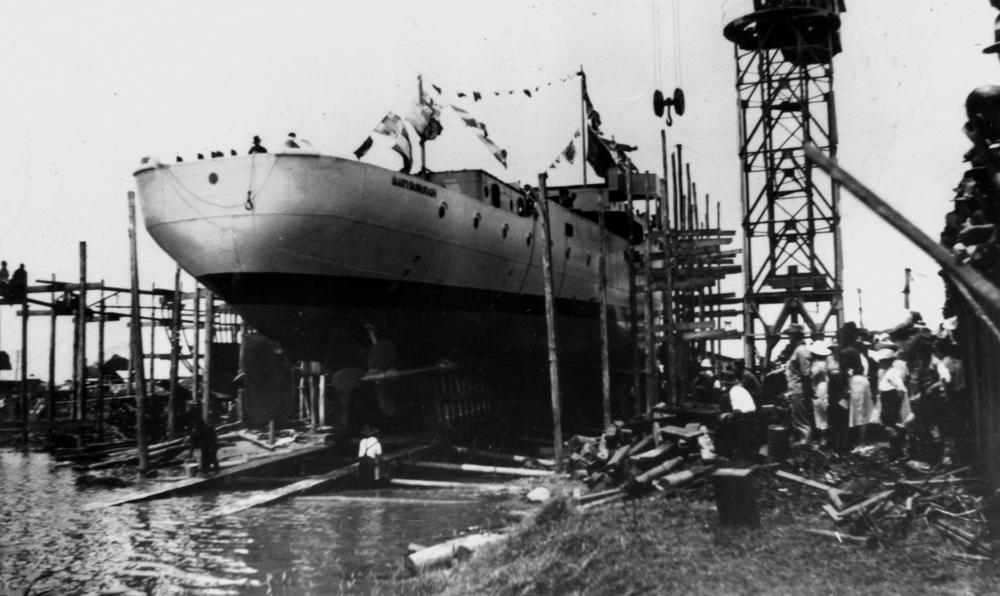
Ship building along the Mary River

Australia's only outbreak of pneumonic plague occurred in Maryborough in 1905. At the time Maryborough was Queensland's largest port—a reception centre for wool, meat, timber, sugar and other rural products. A freighter from Hong Kong, where plague was rampant, was in the Port of Maryborough about the time that a wharf worker named Richard O'Connell took home some sacking from the wharf, for his children to sleep on. Subsequently, five of the seven O'Connell children, two nurses, and a neighbour died from the disease. There were no more cases but the ensuing fear, panic, and hysteria totally consumed the town, and a huge crowd gathered to witness the family's house being burnt to the ground by health officials. A memorial fountain was built in the grounds of the City Hall and dedicated to the nurses, Cecelia Bauer and Rose Wiles.

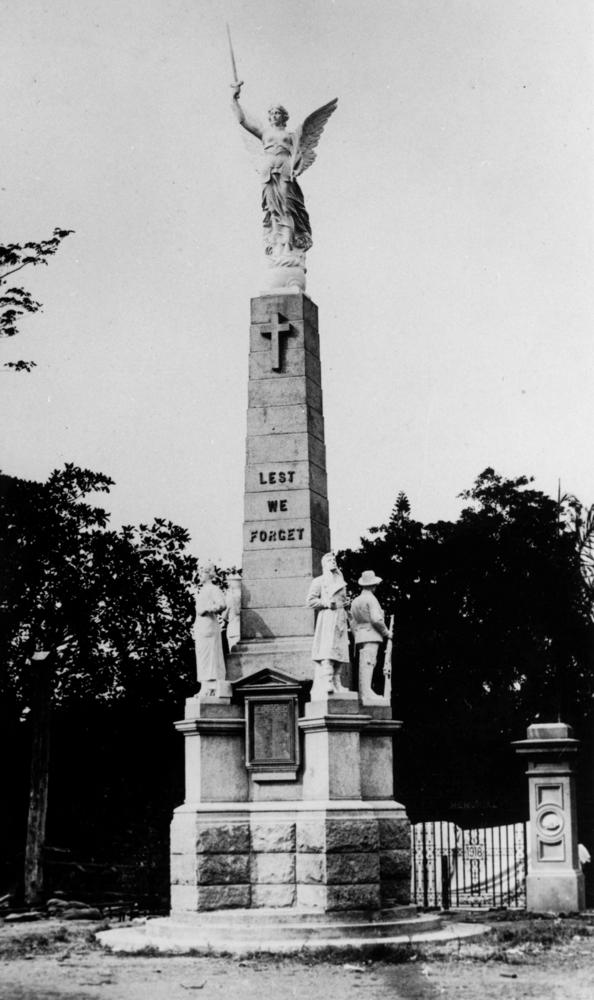
Maryborough War Memorial, circa 1922

The foundation stone of Maryborough War Memorial was laid on 22 May 1921 by Lieutenant Colonel James Durrant. It was dedicated on 19 November 1922.

The Andronicus Brothers - Jim and George, formerly from the Greek island of Kythera, established the Café Mimosa in Kent Street, Maryborough in the 1920s. Café Mimosa had a reception lounge above the café large enough to host sporting teams, wedding receptions, musical events and the Philharmonic choir during its practice sessions.

Maryborough Special School opened on 1 January 1969.

Aldridge State High School opened on 30 January 1973. It was named after Edgar Thomas Aldridge, the first resident of Baddow.

The Maryborough Library opened in 1977 and underwent a major refurbishment in 2011. The Maryborough Toy and Special Needs Library opened in 2006.

In 1979, the desire for Catholic co-education resulted in the amalgamation of St Mary's School and Sacred Heart College to create St Mary's Primary School (the primary school for boys and girls) and St Mary's College (the secondary school for boys and girls).

St Aidan's Anglican Church at Baddow closed circa 1983.

St Mary's College opened in 1983.

In 2008 the Maryborough City Council was amalgamated into the Fraser Coast Regional Council.

== Demographics ==
In the 2016 census, the suburb of Maryborough had a population of 15,406 people.

In the 2021 census, the suburb of Maryborough had a population of 15,287 people, and the urban area had a population of 27,489 people.

== Heritage listings ==
Maryborough has a number of heritage-listed sites, including:

- St Paul's Anglican Church and Hall, 178–202 Adelaide Street
- St Mary's Roman Catholic Church, 271–275 Adelaide Street
- Albert State School, 210–220 Albert Street
- Post Office Hotel, Bazaar Street
- Maryborough Post Office, 227 Bazaar Street
- Lamington Bridge, Gympie Road to Ferry Street, across Mary River
- Maryborough Boys Grammar School Building, Kent Street
- Maryborough Central State School, Kent Street
- Royal Hotel, Kent Street
- former Royal Bank of Queensland, 297 Kent Street
- Hotel Francis, 310 Kent Street
- former Queensland National Bank, 327 Kent Street
- Australian Joint Stock Bank, 331 Kent Street
- Maryborough City Hall, 388 Kent Street
- Maryborough School of Arts, 427 Kent Street
- Maryborough Baby Clinic, 445 Kent Street (25.5371°S 152.7019°E)
- Maryborough railway station, Lennox Street
- Brennan & Geraghtys Store, 62–66 Lennox Street
- Ilfracombe (house), 335 Lennox Street
- Engineers' Arms Hotel, 115 March Street
- Oonooraba, 50 Pallas Street
- Eskdale, 53 Pallas Street
- Baddow House, 366 Queen Street
- Customs House, Richmond Street
- Maryborough Courthouse, Richmond Street
- Maryborough Heritage Centre, 164 Richmond Street
- Original Maryborough Town Site, Russell Street
- Second World War RAAF Buildings, Maryborough Airport, Frank Lawrence Circuit
- Queen's Park, Sussex Street
- Maryborough Base Hospital, Walker Street
- Maryborough Cemetery: Mortuary Chapel, Walker Street
- Government Bond Store, Wharf Street
- Maryborough Waterside Workers' Hall, 96 Wharf Street
- Criterion Hotel, 98 Wharf Street
- Gataker's Warehouse Complex, 106–108 Wharf Street & 310 Kent Street
- Customs House Hotel, 116 Wharf Street
- Maryborough Government Offices Building, 123 Wharf Street
- Wharf Street Shop, 134 Wharf Street

== Economy and industry ==
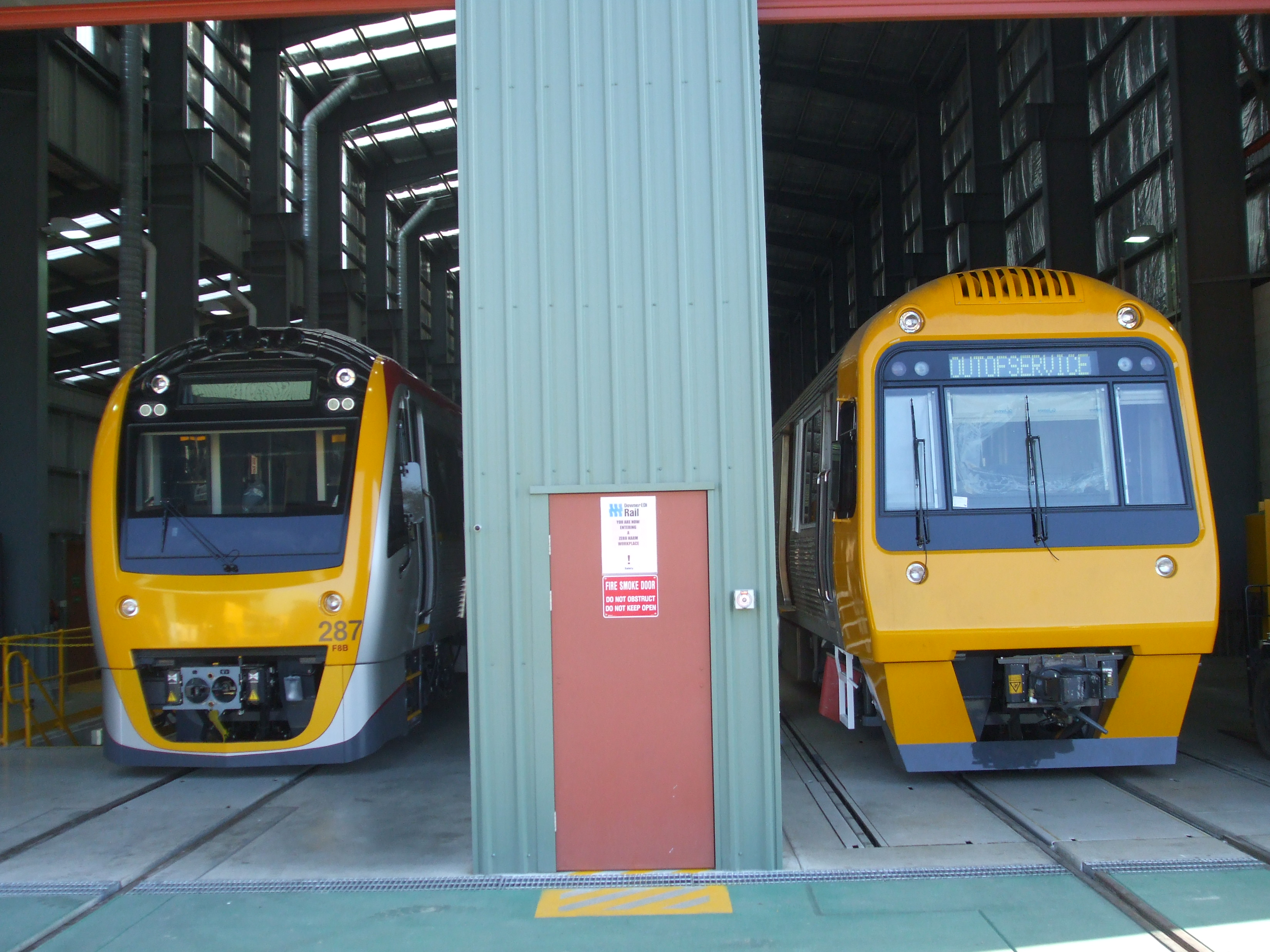
A new train for Brisbane's suburban network sits next to an older refurbished unit at Downer Rail's facility in Maryborough

Tourism plays a significant part in the economy of the city today. Maryborough is the self-styled Heritage City of Queensland and holds heritage markets each Thursday. The city has many preserved 19th and 20th century buildings including the General Post Office and Customs House.

The main industrial company in the city today is Downer Rail, formerly Walkers Limited, a heavy engineering business which has built much of the rolling stock and locomotives for Queensland Rail and in past years was involved in shipbuilding. Downer Rail, together with Bombardier Transportation, built and tested Transperth's relatively modern B-Series trains in Maryborough, which were launched in Perth in late 2004. It has built many trains for Queensland Rail. Bombardier Transportation closed its factory in Maryborough in December 2015.

Maryborough Sugar Factory, in Kent Street was established in 1956. There were many smaller sugar mills which were established by sugar cane farmers along the Mary River. Island Plantation had one of the first sugar crushing mill set up along the river. One of the old settlements in Maryborough is at a place called Dundathu. Here the first timber mill was established in the 1800s. The timber was bought down the river and carted to the Timber Mill by horse and cart. The timber mill burnt down in the 1900s.

Maryborough's income also comes from numerous farming and station prospects in and around the city and has a healthy fishing industry. The city also has had traditional ties to the timber industry and is home to Hyne & Son one of the largest producers of natural timber products in Australia.

Maryborough was once a prominent centre of railway and tramway operations, including a branch to the wharf on the Mary River.

== Transport ==
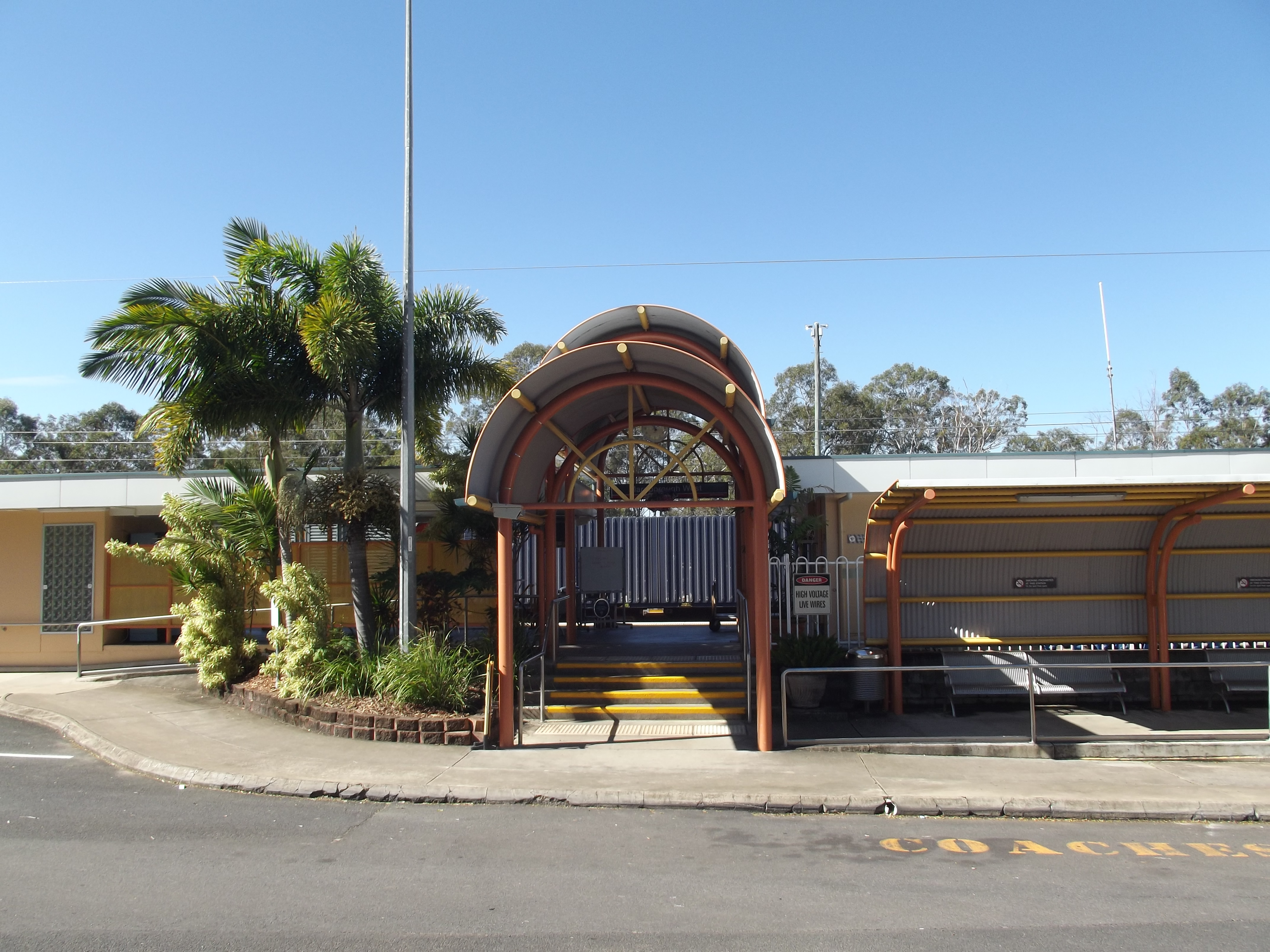
Maryborough West station in July 2012

Maryborough West station is on the North Coast line. It is served by long-distance Traveltrain services: the Spirit of Queensland, Spirit of the Outback and the Bundaberg and Rockhamption Tilt Trains.

This station, on the western outskirts of the city, was built in the late 1980s as part of a seven kilometre new alignment built when the North Coast line was electrified. It replaced Maryborough station in the central business district, although the eight kilometre branch remains in use to service the 66 Rail workshops.

Maryborough is served by Greyhound Australia coach services to Brisbane, Hervey Bay, Agnes Water and Cairns, Premier Motor Services services to Brisbane and Cairns and Tory's Tours services to Brisbane and Hervey Bay.

Local bus services are provided by Wide Bay Transit as part of the Translink network.

The Maryborough Airport no longer has commercial flights, with the nearest commercial airport at Hervey Bay, approximately 30 kilometres away at Hervey Bay, which has direct flights to Brisbane, Melbourne and Sydney.

== Education ==
Maryborough Central State School is a government primary (Prep–6) school for boys and girls at 471 Kent Street (25.5354°S 152.6994°E). In 2018, the school had an enrolment of 302 students with 26 teachers (24 full-time equivalent) and 26 non-teaching staff (14 full-time equivalent). It includes a special education program.

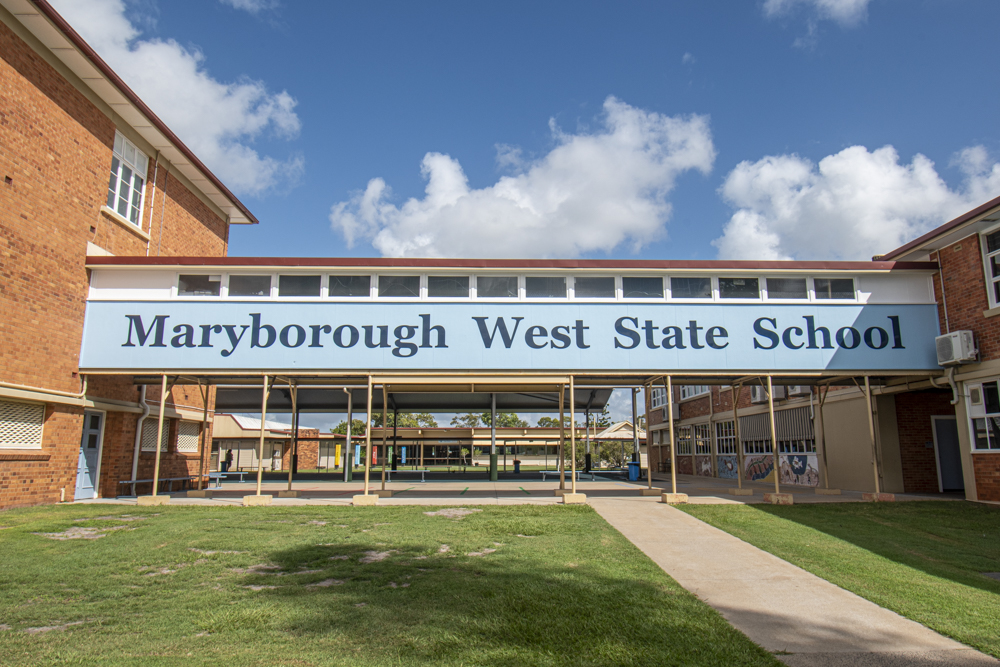
Maryborough West State School, 2025

Maryborough West State School is a government primary (Early Childhood to Year 6) school for boys and girls at 149 North Street (25.5237°S 152.6945°E). In 2018, the school had an enrolment of 365 students with 30 teachers (28 full-time equivalent) and 21 non-teaching staff (13 full-time equivalent). It includes a special education program.

Albert State School is a government primary (Prep–6) school for boys and girls at 210–220 Albert Street (25.5467°S 152.7038°E). In 2018, the school had an enrolment of 128 students with 8 teachers and 11 non-teaching staff (6 full-time equivalent).

Sunbury State School is a government primary (Prep–6) school for boys and girls at 545 Alice Street (25.5251°S 152.6778°E). In 2018, the school had an enrolment of 211 students with 16 teachers (14 full-time equivalent) and 15 non-teaching staff (10 full-time equivalent). It includes a special education program.

St Mary's Primary School is a Catholic primary (Prep–6) school for boys and girls at 167 John Street (25.5339°S 152.7022°E). In 2018, the school had an enrolment of 312 students with 22 teachers (20 full-time equivalent) and 21 non-teaching staff (11 full-time equivalent).

Maryborough State High School is a government secondary (7–12) school for boys and girls at 526 Kent Street (25.5344°S 152.6975°E). In 2018, the school had an enrolment of 778 students with 72 teachers (69 full-time equivalent) and 46 non-teaching staff (35 full-time equivalent). It includes a special education program.

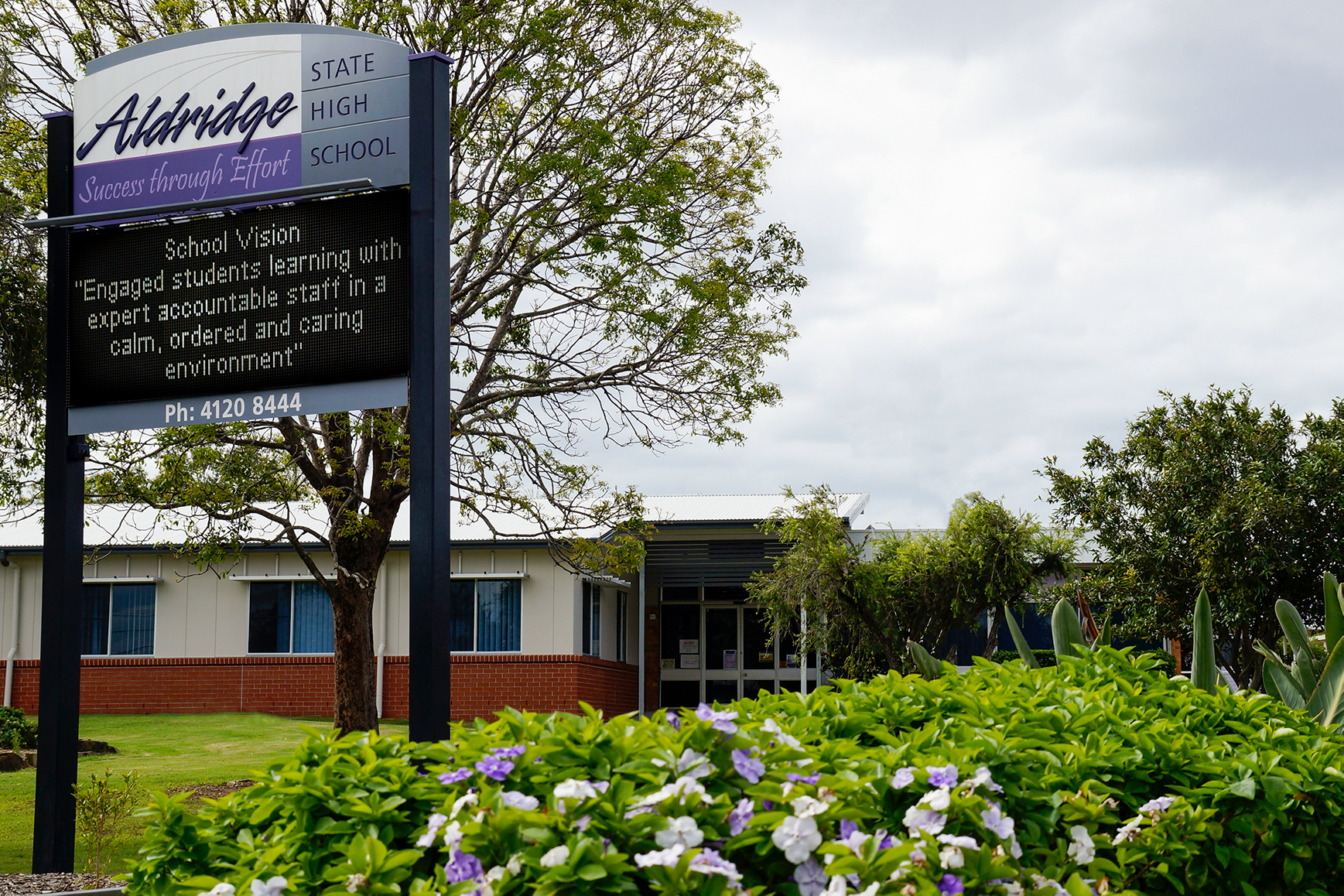
Aldridge State High School, 2022

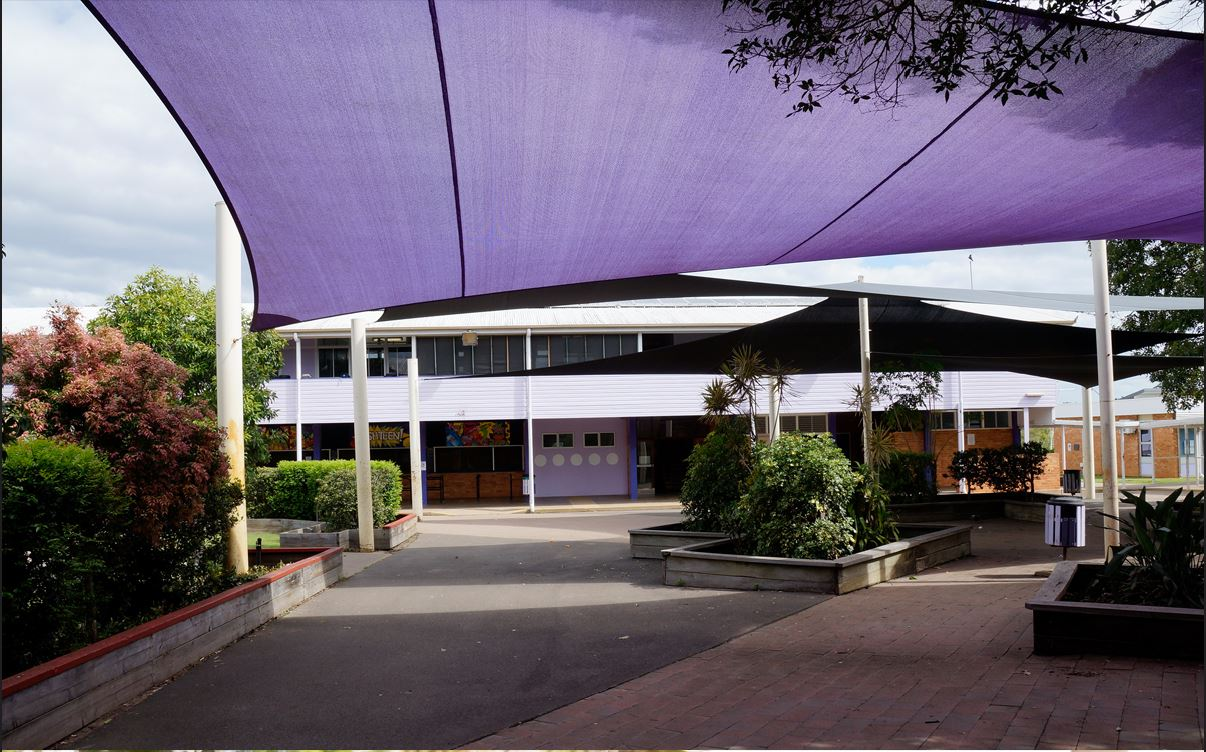
Aldridge State High School, 2022

Aldridge State High School is a government secondary (7–12) school for boys and girls at 47 Boys Avenue (25.5165°S 152.6885°E). In 2018, the school had an enrolment of 1,031 students with 93 teachers (87 full-time equivalent) and 58 non-teaching staff (40 full-time equivalent). It includes a special education program.

St Mary's College is a Catholic secondary (7–12) school for boys and girls at 51 Lennox Street (25.5424°S 152.6968°E). In 2018, the school had an enrolment of 377 students with 38 teachers (36 full-time equivalent) and 24 non-teaching staff (19 full-time equivalent).

Maryborough Special School is a special primary and secondary (Prep–12) school for boys and girls at 164 Woodstock Street (25.5174°S 152.6955°E). In 2018, the school had an enrolment of 81 students with 23 teachers (19 full-time equivalent) and 28 non-teaching staff (17 full-time equivalent).

Riverside Christian College (Prep–12) is located at 23 Royle Street. It also provides distance education.

Maryborough TAFE Campus is at 89 Adelaide Street (25.5416°S 152.6994°E).

== Amenities ==
The Brolga Theatre on the banks of the Mary River at Maryborough is the Fraser Coast's premier entertainment venue. The main auditorium has 900 seats.

The Fraser Coast Regional Council operates a public library, the John Anderson Library, at 127-129 Bazaar Street.

ANZAC Park features a number of amenities, including Splashside (a water play park), skatepark and pump track.

The Wide Bay Hospitals Museum is located at the Maryborough Hospital.

The Maryborough Military and Colonial Museum is located in part of the heritage listed Gataker's Warehouse Complex on Wharf Street.

The Maryborough City Whistle Stop Museum focuses on the railway history of Maryborough and is housed in the heritage listed former Maryborough railway station, Queensland.

LifeChurch Maryborough is at 68 Gayndah Road, Maryborough West (25.5168°S 152.6640°E). It is part of the Wesleyan Methodist Church of Australia.

== Sport ==
Maryborough will host the 2032 Olympic and Paralympic Archery events.

Rugby league is popular in Maryborough. The premier club is the Maryborough Wallaroos, which competes in the Queensland Rugby League Central Division Bundaberg Rugby League competition. The team won the Bundaberg competition in 2009 and won the Fraser Coast Rugby League competition in 2010 and 2011 after moving into that competition. The Wallaroos claim to be the oldest club playing rugby league in Australia, being founded in 1893 when a rugby union club.

Soccer is also popular; there are 5 clubs located in Maryborough and affiliated with Football Maryborough - Doon Villa, Granville, Maryboough West, Sunbury and Tinana. These clubs offer soccer for all ages and abilities - juniors and seniors, girls and boys, women and men. In 2021 Doon Villa celebrated 50 years since its establishment in 1971 and in 2022 their long-time rivals Sunbury will celebrate 50 years since their establishment in 1972. Federation Park in Banana Street, Granville is Football Maryborough's home soccer complex comprising 11 active fields.

The Maryborough Bears Australian rules football club is based out of Federation Park and have competed in the AFL Wide Bay competition since 1998.

Maryborough Cricket Club is in Maryborough & District Cricket Association.

Maryborough Speedway, off Gympie Road in Tinana, races sedans and includes a motorcycle speedway track within the site (25°33′48″S 152°40′02″E). The track hosted the Queensland Solo Championship during the 2017/2018 season.

Point Lookout Croquet Club is at 23 North Street (25.5317°S 152.7051°E).

The city was the location for the 2013 and 2025 Australian Scout Jamborees.

== Media ==
Local commercial FM radio stations are Breeze 102.5, Triple M 103.5, Hit 101.9 and Rebel 106.7.

The Maryborough Sun is published fortnightly.

Along with a number of other regional Australian newspapers owned by NewsCorp, the Maryborough Herald newspaper ceased publication in June 2020.

== Ecology ==
Maryborough's environment supports rare and endangered terrestrial and aquatic fauna including the Mary River Turtle and Mary River Cod.

== Climate ==
Maryborough has a humid subtropical climate (Cfa) with long, wet, humid summers and short, relatively dry, mild winters, albeit with cool nights. It features 107.2 clear days annually, with August being the sunniest month (with 15.3 clear days) and February being the cloudiest (with only 2.9 clear days).

Climate data for Maryborough
Month	Jan	Feb	Mar	Apr	May	Jun	Jul	Aug	Sep	Oct	Nov	Dec	Year
Record high °C (°F)	39.6 (103.3)	38.8 (101.8)	38.0 (100.4)	34.0 (93.2)	31.5 (88.7)	29.7 (85.5)	30.1 (86.2)	33.1 (91.6)	34.7 (94.5)	39.4 (102.9)	38.6 (101.5)	40.6 (105.1)	40.6 (105.1)
Mean daily maximum °C (°F)	30.8 (87.4)	30.3 (86.5)	29.3 (84.7)	27.5 (81.5)	24.7 (76.5)	22.4 (72.3)	22.1 (71.8)	23.5 (74.3)	25.8 (78.4)	27.8 (82.0)	29.4 (84.9)	30.6 (87.1)	27.0 (80.6)
Mean daily minimum °C (°F)	20.7 (69.3)	20.6 (69.1)	19.4 (66.9)	16.6 (61.9)	13.1 (55.6)	10.3 (50.5)	8.7 (47.7)	9.3 (48.7)	12.1 (53.8)	15.4 (59.7)	17.8 (64.0)	19.6 (67.3)	15.3 (59.5)
Record low °C (°F)	13.3 (55.9)	14.4 (57.9)	11.8 (53.2)	5.5 (41.9)	1.9 (35.4)	−0.6 (30.9)	−1.4 (29.5)	−0.8 (30.6)	1.5 (34.7)	4.6 (40.3)	6.6 (43.9)	11.6 (52.9)	−1.4 (29.5)
Average precipitation mm (inches)	161.4 (6.35)	171.0 (6.73)	157.6 (6.20)	85.4 (3.36)	77.0 (3.03)	65.4 (2.57)	51.5 (2.03)	40.6 (1.60)	41.5 (1.63)	77.9 (3.07)	84.7 (3.33)	129.8 (5.11)	1,144.8 (45.07)
Average precipitation days	13.2	13.8	14.7	11.8	10.7	8.5	7.3	6.4	6.6	8.1	9.0	10.8	120.9

== Notable people ==
- Barbara J. Bain, an eminent haematologist at the Imperial College, and St Mary's Hospital, London, was born in Maryborough.
- Maurice Blair, rugby league player, was born in Maryborough.
- Tom Burns, former Deputy Premier of Queensland, was born in Maryborough
- Arthur Cusack, Olympic swimming coach
- Robert Cusack, Olympic swimming medallist was born in Maryborough and coached by Maryborough's Arthur Cusack
- Jamie Charman, Brisbane Lions premiership ruckman, was born in Maryborough.
- Paul de Jersey, former Governor of Queensland, former Chief Justice of Queensland grew up in Maryborough, where his father was the headmaster of Albert State School.
- Quentin Dempster, journalist, was born in Maryborough and began his career at the Maryborough Chronicle.
- Brendan Hansen represented Maryborough on the Maryborough City Council, Queensland State Parliament, and Federal Parliament.
- Mary Hansen of Stereolab was born in Maryborough (daughter of Brendan Hansen)
- Wilfred Hastings (Arch) Harrington (1906–1965), naval officer, was born in Maryborough.
- William Jonas, Better known as Mully, YouTuber and member of YouTube group The Boys.
- Grant Kenny, ironman, was born in Maryborough in 1963.
- Margo Kingston, author and political journalist, was born in Maryborough but raised in Mackay.
- Joe Kilroy, rugby league player, was born in Maryborough.
- Arthur Lambourn, NZ Rugby Union All Black, was born in Maryborough and educated at Maryborough Central State School
- Clover Maitland, hockey player, comes from Maryborough.
- John McBryde, hockey player, comes from Maryborough.
- Don McWatters, hockey player, comes from Maryborough.
- Jenn Morris, hockey player comes from Maryborough.
- Larry Sengstock, basketball player and executive
- David Theile, Olympic swimming medalist, was born in Maryborough and coached by Maryborough's Arthur Cusack
- P. L. Travers, author of the Mary Poppins books was born in Maryborough. She moved to Bowral at age eight. Her father managed a bank, the Australian Joint Stock Bank, in the building where, in a room on the second storey, she was born. This is in the centre of town and still in use, no longer as a bank but as a museum about Travers, called The Story Bank. A life-size bronze statue of Mary Poppins, as P.L. Travers described her, complete with umbrella was erected outside the old bank premises at 331 Kent Street, on the corner of Richmond Street, in 2005. It is now one of Maryborough's most famous and photographed icons.
- Alan Wilkie, weather presenter, was born in Maryborough.

In 2017, the Fraser Coast Regional Council established Maryborough's Walk of Achievers which places plaques along the streets of Maryborough celebrating the achievements of its residents.

== Sister city ==
Maryborough has one sister city, according to the Australian Sister Cities Association.

- Tauranga, New Zealand

== See also ==
- Maryborough Correctional Centre
- Maryborough Fire Brigade Board
