= Maryborough Baby Clinic =

- Location within Queensland
- 25.5371°S 152.7019°E
- Location: 445 Kent Street, Maryborough, Fraser Coast Region, Queensland, Australia

History
- Design period: 1919-1930s Interwar period
- Built: 1924

Site notes
- Architect: Queensland Works Department
- Architectural style: Mediterranean

Queensland Heritage Register
- Official name: Maryborough Baby Clinic (former)
- Type: state heritage
- Designated: 4 December 2020
- Reference no.: 650256
- Type: Health and care services: Clinic-maternal and child welfare
- Theme: Providing health and welfare services: Caring for women and children

Maryborough Baby Clinic is a heritage-listed former health clinic at 445 Kent Street, Maryborough, Fraser Coast Region, Queensland, Australia. It was designed by the Queensland Works Department and built in 1924. It was added to the Queensland Heritage Register on 4 December 2020.

== History ==
The former Maryborough Baby Clinic was built in 1924, and is situated on the prominent corner of Kent and Lennox streets, opposite the Maryborough City Hall. Following the introduction of the Maternity Act 1922, which was part of a movement to improve the health of mothers and babies, the clinic was one of ten regional clinics built by the Queensland Government throughout the state in the early 1920s. Constructed to a standard, high-quality design by the Department of Public Works, the Maryborough Baby Clinic remains highly intact. The clinic served the Maryborough community until its closure in the mid-1990s.

Maryborough is a regional centre 215 kilometres (134 mi) north of Brisbane, and forms part of the traditional land of the Butchulla (Badjala) people. The original township of Maryborough was situated further west upstream on the Mary River, after wharves were established there in 1847–8, to provide transport for wool from sheep stations on the Burnett River. In 1852, the growing town was gradually relocated further downstream where ships were able to better navigate the river. Development followed, and by March 1861 Maryborough was declared a municipality. During the late 1860s and 1870s, Maryborough developed rapidly as the port for the nearby gold rushes in the Gympie area. By the 1920s, Maryborough had a population of more than 10,000 people and was a major regional centre.

In the mid-19th century, deaths of children under five comprised 50 percent of all deaths. While this had been reduced to 11 per cent by the turn of the century, this was still too high. Dysentery, diarrhoea, cholera, diphtheria and typhoid were the main causes of death in the late 19th century. Mrs Mary McConnel, formerly of Cressbrook Station in the Brisbane Valley, initiated the establishment of the first children's hospital in 1878 in Brisbane, the second such hospital in Australia. The first resident medical officer for the Brisbane Children's Hospital, Dr Alfred Jefferis Turner, was appointed in 1889. Turner's early work was in the eradication of diphtheria. Through his collaboration with Brisbane doctor LN Ashworth, their use of the antitoxin led to a significant drop in the death rate from diphtheria between January 1895 and November 1896. Other significant medical advances made by Brisbane-based doctors include the identification of hookworm as the cause of filariasis, the introduction of a test to identify typhoid and the identification of lead in paint as a significant factor in lead poisoning of children, an issue which required a long public campaign to reduce the lead content in paint.

Despite these advances, infant mortality still remained high, being 10.68 per cent of all deaths in 1892 and 10.91 per cent in 1901. Diarrhoeal disease was still a major factor and there was a higher death rate during the summer months, many of which could be attributed to poor infant feeding. Dr Turner embarked on another public health campaign, in educating mothers in the hygienic preparation of food, particularly for those infants not breast fed.

The early 1920s heralded a major public health campaign by the Queensland Government following the introduction of the Maternity Act 1922. As part of a national and international movement to improve the health of mothers and babies, baby clinics were established throughout Queensland. Under the stewardship of the Department of Public Works (DPW), a standard design for the Queensland regional baby clinic was produced. Based on this plan, ten regional clinics were built. These included Rockhampton, Townsville (demolished), Ipswich, Toowoomba, Bundaberg, Gympie, Mackay, Charters Towers, Warwick and Maryborough. A baby clinic was established in Cairns at this time, but it was not of the standard design and is no longer extant.The Rockhampton clinic was the first to be opened on Saturday 27 October 1923. It was described in the 1924 DPW Report:

"A compact tile-roofed one-storey reinforced cement plaster building of attractive design, containing waiting hall 16 ft by 16 ft; a doctor's room 12 ft by 11 ft; treatment room 13 ft by 11 ft; retiring and nurse's rooms 11ft by 10 ft with water closet, lavatories, store, press etc. Modern fittings and furnishings have been installed throughout and a septic system provided for conveniences."

Specifications for the Rockhampton Clinic are indicative of those used for the standardised designed clinics. They were domestic in scale, included Classical architectural treatments to the street-fronting elevations and included interior treatments that were hygienic and easily cleaned. Generally, the foundations were altered to suit individual sites, but essentially the same elevations and floor plans were adapted from the original plan. Some clinics had a bathroom added adjacent to the kitchen if the nurse lived on site, and others had a tool room included, adjacent to the sink room, to enable the gardener to maintain the grounds.

The government was eager to have a baby clinic established in Maryborough, to serve the major regional town and its district. Following a visit in March 1923, the home secretary, Mr William McCormack, identified an appropriate site for a new baby clinic, a vacant lot on the corner of Kent and Lennox streets, adjacent to the stately Maryborough School of Arts and opposite the grand Maryborough City Hall. Between 1876 and 1908, this had been the site of the first town hall. The old town hall had become dilapidated, and amidst community support, removed from the site in 1908. The old town hall was moved to a site at 95 Richmond Street in 2020

In 1910, the vacant lot had been granted by the government for a new technical college. However, by the early 1920s, this was yet to be constructed. At this time, the already existing technical college's classes were being held in the Maryborough School of Arts building, where accommodation was strained. Debate between the college's committee members in relation to the suitability of the small 1-rood-36-perch (1,900 m^{2}) site resulted in another location, beside the grammar school (now Maryborough State High School), being granted by the government for the technical college in 1920.

In April 1923, it was announced that the former college reserve would be the site for a new baby clinic. Following the completion of the plans by the DPW, the construction of the clinic began in late 1923 and finished by September 1924. The official opening ceremony, attended by several dignitaries including the Assistant Home Secretary, MJ Kirwan MLA, was held on the afternoon of Saturday 13 September 1924. The new clinic was described in the local newspaper:

"[The clinic] will be of reinforced concrete, with the partitions of the same material ... the roof will be of Marseilles tiles, and will be surmounted by a fleche ... which will add to the ornamental effect as well as provide for utility. The frontage of the building will be to Kent Street and will stand about 10 feet from the footpath. The clinic will contain several rooms, the dimensions of the whole building being 40 feet frontage and 37 feet in depth. A porch entrance will be provided and off this will be a waiting hall ... [there] will be the doctors' and nurses' rooms, treatment room, retiring room, and a kitchen and sink room, while the various conveniences will be provided for.

Two nurses were appointed for the clinic, with Ms MA McLean in charge. The doctor for the clinic was Honorary Medical Officer, Dr HC Garde. An attractive timber fence, which had been built as early as 1910, was in good condition and retained.

The establishment of baby clinics throughout Queensland was financed through the profits of the state run lottery, the Golden Casket, established in 1920. The Maternity Act 1922 sought to decrease the death rate for mothers and babies; to increase the birth-rate; to expand outback settlement and to train mothers how to care for children and essentially develop a healthy population. The Act also initiated the establishment of a network of free maternity hospitals throughout Queensland, managed under the Motherhood, Child Welfare and Hospital Fund.

In response to the high infant death rate at the turn of the 20th century, Queensland's first baby clinic had opened in Brisbane in 1908 and was attended by Dr Turner, who saw up to 100 babies a week, free of charge. Following a conference on child welfare in Sydney in 1916, representatives of women's organisations, benevolent societies and the Crèche and Kindergarten Association lobbied the home secretary, John Huxham to establish a network of baby clinics in Queensland. In August 1917, he announced that three clinics would be built, which was later expanded to four. At that time the first baby clinic had just been built in Victoria, while New South Wales already had eleven. All were based on the philosophy of New Zealand doctor, Frederick Truby King, which promoted breast feeding, the training of nurses in maternal and infant welfare and the education of mothers in domestic hygiene.

A national agenda for public health and social reform was implicit in the growth of the town planning movement. The second Australian Town Planning Conference and Exhibition held in Brisbane in mid-1918 included a display illustrating the proper care of babies. The organiser of this conference was Charles Edward Chuter, an officer of the home secretary's department, who was to have a significant impact on local government and on the health system in Queensland. He had managed the finances of the Brisbane General Hospital from 1917, and sought the means to implement the social policies of the recently elected Labor government of T J Ryan. Chuter established the Motherhood, Child Welfare and Hospital Fund, which was financed through the Golden Casket Lottery. He also had significant input into the drafting of the Maternity Act 1922. The decision to operate a regular lottery from 1920, with the profits deposited into the Hospital Trust Account, financed a major building program in maternity hospitals and baby clinics.

The first government baby clinic in Queensland opened in a rented cottage in Brunswick Street, Fortitude Valley (Brisbane) on 8 March 1918, managed by Matron Florence Chatfield of the Diamantina Hospital. Three more clinics opened shortly after at Woolloongabba, Spring Hill and West End. Nurse Chatfield travelled north in October 1920, seeking suitable sites to build clinics in Cairns, Townsville and Rockhampton, preferring a central location, close to the shopping areas and close to public transport. She also sought support from at least one doctor in each town to act as the Honorary Medical Officer, attached to the clinic.

Between October 1923 and November 1924, new baby clinics were erected at Rockhampton, Townsville (now demolished), Ipswich, Toowoomba, Cairns (now demolished), Bundaberg and Maryborough. A new Fortitude Valley clinic, replacing the Brunswick Street clinic, opened in 1924, and included a training school for nurses. The training centre staff had been educated in both New Zealand and Sydney and the centre produced eight graduates in 1924 and eleven in 1925. Thirty-five maternity wards were built in hospitals across the state at this time. Between 1926 and 1930 baby clinics were erected at Gympie, Mackay, Charters Towers and Warwick, with new substantial brick clinics built at Woolloongabba and Herschel Street in the Brisbane CBD.

Once in operation, the centrally located Maryborough Baby Clinic proved a valuable facility for both mothers from Maryborough and those from surrounding districts. The work of the nurses was to give advice:

"to expectant mothers in matters regarding their own health and that of their babies, before and after birth; to visit all newborn infants within their districts so far as possible; to distribute leaflets and invite the mothers to visit the clinics; to encourage natural feeding of infants ... to advise medical or hospital treatment for such cases as may need it; and to educate the women of Queensland in mothercraft, so that the next generation will be stronger, wiser and happier."

Accommodation for one nurse was provided in the clinic building. As well as tending to mothers visiting the clinic, the nurses were expected to make home visits to those unable to travel into Maryborough. There were also branch baby clinics set up in Pialba, Biggenden, Howard and Childers, with a nurse from the Maryborough clinic visiting once a week.

In 1924, it was reported that the establishment of baby clinics in Queensland was proving to be a success with "40,356 attendances at clinics" throughout the state. Specifically, in December 1927, the Maryborough clinic recorded 629 new births for that year, with the rate of infant mortality decreasing. By February 1930, attendances at the clinic had reached 726 per month.

In 1940 the Kent and Lennox streets corner of the clinic site was truncated by the Maryborough City Council in an attempt to improve traffic safety. It was agreed that the existing fence would be realigned to accommodate this. By the early 1960s, this timber fence was deemed beyond repair by the DPW and was subsequently replaced with the current tubular pipe-framed chain wire fence in 1960.

In 1965, a rear extension was constructed to provide extra room for the clinic. It consisted of a new laundry, bathroom and public toilet. Minor alterations were made to the clinic building at this time including changing the use of one of the rooms for extra accommodation for the nurses. In 1977, a carport was built at the Lennox Street side of the clinic. The clinic continued to serve the Maryborough community until its closure in the mid-1990s. It was then leased to several commercial tenancies until the property was sold to the Fraser Coast Regional Council in 2020.

The former Maryborough Baby Clinic, established in 1924, following the introduction of the Maternity Act 1922, played a central role in the health and wellbeing of mothers and their babies throughout the Maryborough district for more than 70 years. The clinic is a highly intact example of the Department of Public Works' standard design for regional baby clinics. Prominently sited, the finely designed building makes a positive contribution to the streetscape of Maryborough's civic centre.

== Description ==
The former Maryborough Baby Clinic is located in the Maryborough central business district at the corner of Kent and Lennox streets. Domestic in scale and appearance, the building faces southeast toward Kent Street and is sited in an open yard providing views to the building from Kent and Lennox Streets. The baby clinic is a strong contributor to the streetscape of late 19th century and early 20th century masonry civic buildings of a similar quality of design and detail.

The Maryborough Baby Clinic Building (former) is an intact single-storey concrete building with a roughcast finish. It is approximately T-shaped in plan and has a hip roof with a prominent fleche at the centre of the ridge. The front (south-west) elevation is symmetrical with a central recessed entry porch flanked by two pairs of Tuscan order columns. The main entrance is from the front porch, accessed via a central cascading stair, which leads to the central waiting hall.

The interior layout reflects the building's use as a baby clinic with former doctor, nurse, retiring and treatment rooms opening from a large central waiting room. Leading off the central waiting room, a short hallway accesses a sink room and kitchen at the rear (northeast) of the building. The doctor's room is connected directly to the treatment room and from there through to the sink room.

Minor alterations have been made to the building over time which are not of heritage significance. The linen presses (cupboards) in the waiting hall have been altered to open in to the rear rooms. The nurses' room store and adjoining toilet have been combined by demolishing the partition between, creating one larger room. Original sinks have been removed and some doors replaced. A small extension (1960s) has been made to the rear of the building, requiring the infill of the rear windows.

== Heritage listing ==
Maryborough Baby Clinic was listed on the Queensland Heritage Register on 4 December 2020 having satisfied the following criteria.

The place is important in demonstrating the evolution or pattern of Queensland's history.

The Maryborough Baby Clinic (former) (1924) is important in demonstrating Queensland's response to the movement to reduce infant mortality and improve maternal health during the 1920s, by providing health care to babies and their mothers and education in infant welfare and domestic hygiene.

Constructed and operated as a Queensland Government initiative following the introduction of the Maternity Act 1922, the Maryborough Baby Clinic was established as the base for providing vital material and infant health services in the Wide Bay region. In its form, fabric, materials and layout, it is a representative example of a Department of Public Works standard design regional baby clinic.

The place is important in demonstrating the principal characteristics of a particular class of cultural places.

In its form, fabric, materials and layout, the Maryborough Baby Clinic (former) is important in demonstrating the principal characteristics of a Department of Public Works standard design baby clinic of the 1920s. Highly intact, these include its: central location; domestic scale and form with modest classical influences; symmetrical front elevation; masonry construction with timber-framed hip roof and prominent ventilation fleche; open front porch; functional layout comprising central waiting hall, doctor's office, treatment room, sink room, kitchen, nurse's room, and retiring room; and use of robust materials with simple detailing including roughcast render, terracotta roof tiles, moulded timber joinery, flat sheet ceilings with decorative timber cover battens and glazed doors and multi-light casement windows and fanlights.

The place is important because of its aesthetic significance.

Highly intact, the Maryborough Baby Clinic (former) is important for its aesthetic significance brought about by its beautiful attributes and contribution to the streetscape of the city. Through its skilful use of classical architectural stylistic features, symmetrical composition, open central porch with columns, hip roof with fleche, the building is an attractive, well-composed design.

The place stands on a prominent corner within a collection of impressive late 19th and early 20th century civic buildings clustered at the centre of Maryborough. Views to the building's street elevations, and particularly its porch and fleche, are obtained from Lennox and Kent streets. The building is an important contributor to the streetscape through its modest proportions, use of classical architectural style, symmetrical composition, solid materials, hip roof with fleche, and street-facing porch with columns.
