= Owanyilla, Queensland =

Owanyilla
- Town
- Interactive map of Owanyilla
- Coordinates: 25.6452°S 152.6266°E
- Country: Australia
- State: Queensland
- LGA: Fraser Coast Region
- Location: 20.3 km (12.6 mi) SW of Maryborough; 50.4 km (31.3 mi) SSW of Hervey Bay; 67.2 km (41.8 mi) N of Gympie; 242 km (150 mi) N of Brisbane

Government
  - State electorate: Maryborough
  - Federal division: Wide Bay

Area
  - Total: 43.3 km^{2} (16.7 sq mi)

Population
  - Total: 245 (2021 census)
  - Density: 5.658/km^{2} (14.65/sq mi)
- Time zone: UTC+10:00 (AEST)
- Postcode: 4650
Localities around Owanyilla
Antigua	Glenorchy	Teddington
Pioneers Rest	Owanyilla	Teddington
Tiaro	Tiaro	Teddington

Owanyilla is a rural town and locality in the Fraser Coast Region, Queensland, Australia. In the 2021 census, the locality of Owanyilla had a population of 245 people.

== Geography ==
The Mary River is the western boundary of the locality. Most of the land is used for farming, predominantly grazing but also some crops.

The Bruce Highway passes from south to north through the locality. The North Coast railway line passes south to north to the west of the highway, crossing the Mary River, with the town being served by the Owanyilla railway station (25.6676°S 152.6054°E).

== History ==
In the 1840s, Owanyilla was known as Coopers Plain and Police Camp. Owanyilla was used as a barracks for the Native Police from 1857 until the mid-1860s.

The 20,000-acre (8,100 ha) Mary River Agricultural Reserve was proclaimed circa 1861. The reserve was a two farm wide strip on the eastern bank of the Mary River, with the northern limit being the junction of Graham's Creek with the Mary and the southern boundary, Myrtle Creek, and included Coopers Plain. The town site was gazetted in early 1865.

In 1869 a Wesleyan Methodist chapel was built. Nearby was a brewery owned by Mr. Biddle. It was well-known throughout the district as the source of the famous Owanyilla ale and porter. Mr. Muir, of the hotel, was also postmaster, and the Gympie coach stopped to breakfast and change horses there. Owanyilla was the first stop on the road south of Maryborough.

Owanyilla State School opened in August 1880. It closed in 1937 due to low student numbers. A teacher's residence existed in 1890. The school was on the eastern side of Old Gympie Road (approx 25.64899°S 152.62782°E).

== Demographics ==
In the 2016 census, the locality of Owanyilla had a population of 194 people.

In the 2021 census, the locality of Owanyilla had a population of 245 people.

== Education ==
There are no schools in Owanyilla. The nearest government primary schools are Tiaro State School in neighbouring Tiaro to the south-west and Parke State School in Tinana South to the north. The nearest government secondary school is Maryborough State High School in Maryborough to the north.
