= Magnolia, Queensland =

Magnolia
- Suburb
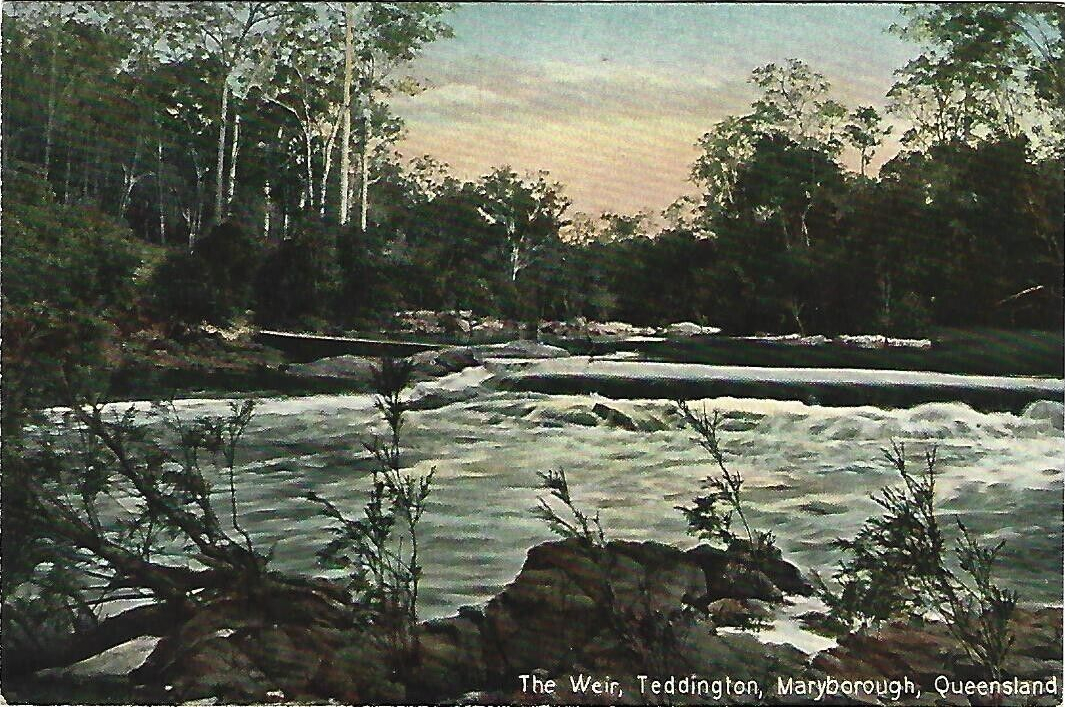
- The Weir over Tinana Creek, Magnolia, circa 1910

- Interactive map of Magnolia
- Coordinates: 25.6622°S 152.69°E
- Country: Australia
- State: Queensland
- LGA: Fraser Coast Region
- Location: 16.9 km (10.5 mi) S of Maryborough; 47.9 km (29.8 mi) S of Hervey Bay; 82.1 km (51.0 mi) N of Gympie; 248 km (154 mi) N of Brisbane

Government
  - State electorate: Maryborough
  - Federal division: Wide Bay

Area
  - Total: 24.1 km^{2} (9.3 sq mi)

Population
  - Total: 115 (2021 census)
  - Density: 4.772/km^{2} (12.36/sq mi)
- Time zone: UTC+10:00 (AEST)
- Postcode: 4650
Suburbs around Magnolia
Teddington	Bidwill	Bidwill
Teddington	Magnolia	Tuan Forest
Teddington	Tuan Forest	Tuan Forest

Magnolia is a rural locality in the Fraser Coast Region, Queensland, Australia. In the 2021 census, Magnolia had a population of 115 people.

== Geography ==
The locality is bounded to the west by Tinana Creek (a tributary of the Mary River) and to the north by Tulesco Road.

The Teddington Weir (25.65006°S 152.66590°E) impounds Tinana Creek with Weir Road crossing the creek through downstream of the weir (25.64950°S 152.66610°E) connecting Magnolia with neighbouring Teddington. Depending on the flow of water over the weir, the road crossing may be over a dry road or through shallow water. There is a water treatment facility on the Teddington side of the weir. The weir and the water treatment facility are operated by the Fraser Coast Regional Council and supply drinking water to the Maryborough area.

The land use in the locality is a mix of crop growing (mostly sugarcane), grazing on native vegetation, and some rural residential housing.

== History ==
Between around 1868 and 1877, a 3,000-acre plantation at Magnolia was managed by Octave Fariola, a Belgian-born former Union Army officer who had also served as part of the Fenian Rising in Ireland in 1867, who had arrived in the colony under the assumed name Octave De Libert following his release from Kilmainham Gaol in Ireland. Farming in partnership with the Hon. William Fielding, he was credited by the Brisbane Courier with being the first grower in the province to crush sugar cane during the winter months, and the first to successfully cultivate fruit-bearing olive trees. After roughly a decade the plantation reportedly comprised some 250 acres of cane, said to be the finest in the province, along with orchards of lemon, orange and peach trees and half a mile of passion fruit vines, though contemporary accounts suggest the operation was never profitable. Fariola gave up the enterprise around 1877, a period that coincided with a destructive fungal blight affecting sugar crops across the Wide Bay district.

Magnolia State School opened on 8 August 1917 as an "open-air" school with 15 students under head teacher Miss M. Gilmer. Its official opening was delayed for various reasons but finally took place in June 1918. In 1940, a decision was made to relocate the school to a new site. In July 1941, the school was officially opened on the new 5-acre (2.0 ha) site on the northern side of Tulesco Road (now within neighbouring Bidwill, 25.64378°S 152.69715°E). It closed on 31 December 1963.

== Demographics ==
In the 2016 census, Magnolia had a population of 130 people.

In the 2021 census, Magnolia had a population of 115 people.

== Education ==
There are no schools in Magnolia. The nearest government primary school is Parke State School in Tinana South to the north. The nearest government secondary school is Maryborough State High School in Maryborough to the north.
