= Teddington, Queensland =

Teddington
- Suburb
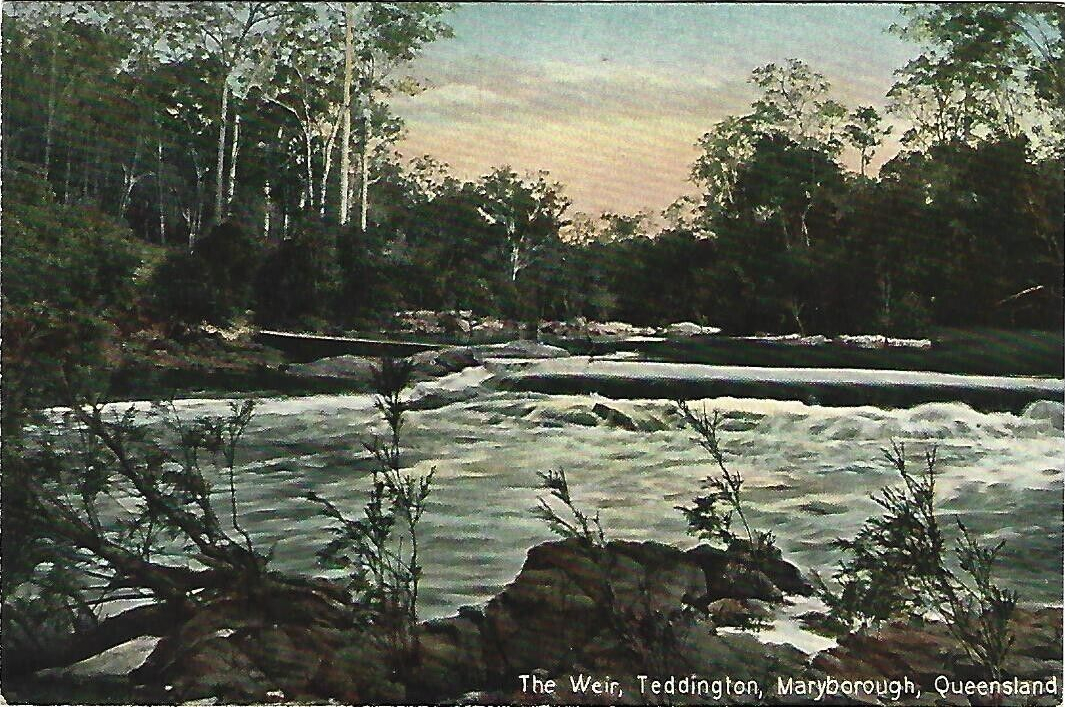
- The Weir, Teddington, circa 1910

- Interactive map of Teddington
- Coordinates: 25.6638°S 152.6611°E
- Country: Australia
- State: Queensland
- LGA: Fraser Coast Region
- Location: 12.4 km (7.7 mi) SSW of Maryborough; 42.5 km (26.4 mi) SSW of Hervey Bay; 255 km (158 mi) N of Brisbane

Government
  - State electorate: Maryborough
  - Federal division: Wide Bay

Area
  - Total: 26.7 km^{2} (10.3 sq mi)

Population
  - Total: 236 (2021 census)
  - Density: 8.84/km^{2} (22.89/sq mi)
- Time zone: UTC+10:00 (AEST)
- Postcode: 4650
Suburbs around Teddington
Tinana South	Tinana South	Bidwill
Glenorchy	Teddington	Magnolia
Owanyilla	Tiaro	Tuan Forest

Teddington is a rural locality in the Fraser Coast Region, Queensland, Australia. In the 2021 census, Teddington had a population of 236 people.

== Geography ==
The locality is bounded to the east, south-east, and south by Tinana Creek, a tributary of the Mary River.

The elevation ranges from 10 to 50 metres (33 to 164 ft) above sea level with the lower elevations along the creek to the east.

The Teddington Weir (25.65006°S 152.66590°E) impounds Tinana Creek with Weir Road crossing the creek downstream of the weir (25.64950°S 152.66610°E) connecting Teddington with neighbouring Magnolia. Depending on the flow of water over the weir, the road crossing may be over a dry road or through shallow water. There is a water treatment facility on the Teddington side of the weir. The weir and the water treatment facility are operated by the Fraser Coast Regional Council and supply drinking water to the Maryborough area.

The land use is predominantly crop growing (mostly sugarcane) with some grazing on native vegetation. There is also rural residential housing, mostly along Philip Drive in the north-west of the locality.

== History ==
In March 1913, local residents requested the Queensland Government provide a school for the local area, pointing out that children were having to walk three or four miles to the school in Tinana. Local sugarcane farmer John Parke donated 5 acres (2.0 ha) of his property "Spring Grove" for the Teddington State School (as it was originally proposed to be named). It was built as an open-air school (a less-enclosed building). The school was officially opened as Parke State School on 24 October 1914 by John Douglas Story, the Under-Secretary for the Department of Education. Story praised the open-air design as being both healthier for the students and cheaper for the government, as small rural schools were not always permanent due to fluctuations in the local population. The school admitted its first 21 students on 11 November 1914; the first teacher was Grace Smith. On 24 November 1914, it was officially confirmed that the school would be known Parke State School in honour of Parke who was killed in a farm accident in November 1913 (although this name was already in unofficial use at time of its opening). The school is now within the boundaries of the neighbouring locality of Tinana South to the north.

Prior to 2008, the locality of Teddington was split between the local government areas of Shire of Tiaro and Shire of Woocoo. However, in 2008, both of these shires were absorbed into the new Fraser Coast Region, reuniting the locality.

== Demographics ==
In the 2016 census, Teddington had a population of 237 people.

In the 2021 census, Teddington had a population of 236 people.

== Education ==
There are no schools in Teddington. The nearest government primary schools are Parke State School in neighbouring Tinana South to the north and Tiaro State School in neighbouring Tiaro to the south. The nearest government secondary school is Maryborough State High School in Maryborough to the north.
