= Commissioner Bidwill's Grave =

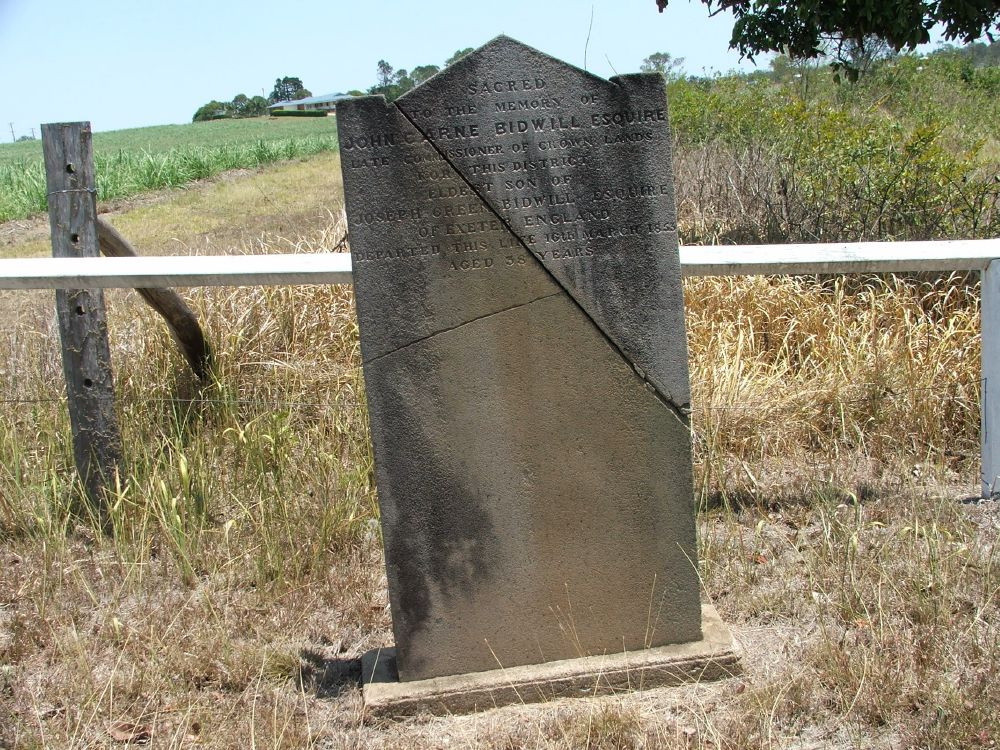
- Commissioner Bidwill's Grave, 2009

- Location within Queensland Location within Australia
- 25.5631°S 152.7111°E
- Location: Cran Road, Tinana, Fraser Coast Region, Queensland, Australia

History
- Design period: 1840s–1860s (mid-19th century)
- Built: 1853

Queensland Heritage Register
- Official name: Commissioner Bidwill's Grave
- Type: state heritage (built)
- Designated: 30 April 1997
- Reference no.: 601822
- Significant period: 1850s (fabric)
- Significant components: trees of social, historic or special significance, burial/grave, headstone

Commissioner Bidwill's Grave is a heritage-listed lone grave of John Carne Bidwill at Cran Road, Tinana, Fraser Coast Region, Queensland, Australia. It was built in 1853. It was added to the Queensland Heritage Register on 30 April 1997.

== History ==
The headstone and lone grave located near the junction of Tinana Creek and the Mary River adjacent to Cran Road known as Commissioner for Crown Lands John Carne Bidwill's grave site is a significant place in the history of the Maryborough region. It marks the final resting place for John Carne Bidwill who was Commissioner for Crown Lands from 1849 to 1852. Bidwill played an important role in the early development of the Wide Bay region, acting as Police Magistrate, Harbour Master, and registrar for Births, Deaths and Marriages.

Bidwill was however first and foremost a talented botanist and natural historian. He is believed to have introduced certain fruits, such as the mango, into Australia. Bidwill took specimen examples of the bunya-bunya pine (Araucaria bidwillii) to London in 1843, a seedling of which was bought by Kew Gardens.

During exploration of the Brisbane Valley and areas to the north in 1841 he found examples of a giant Australian water lily (Nymphaea gigantea). He was involved in experiments to hybridise gladioli, hibiscus and amaryllis. Bidwill's hibiscus crosses were the first scientifically created examples in Australia.

John Carne Bidwill was born in Exeter, England, in February 1815. His father was a merchant. It is thought that his interest in botany was stimulated by two famous nearby nurseries owned by Veitch and Luscombe, Pince & Co. The Luscombe nursery was growing Australian plants in the 1830s. In 1832 Bidwill sailed aboard the "Exmouth" for Canada. After spending two years there he returned to England. In 1838 Bidwill and his sister Elizabeth sailed for Sydney to establish a branch of the family merchandising business in New South Wales.

At the end of 1838 John Bidwill applied for a 2000-acre grant of land to the west of Sydney. However increasing costs per acre of land, a result of the pastoral boom in New South Wales in the period of the late 1830s, saw Bidwill withdraw his application. Bidwill at this time sent back to England his first collection of Australian seeds, which were raised into plants at Joseph Knights Chelsea Nursery.

Bidwill left for New Zealand, arriving there in early 1839. He established two branches of the family business at Tauranga and Rotorua. Bidwill walked to Rotorua, collecting plant specimen's along the way. Two species were named after him resulting from his collecting through New Zealand, Halocarpus bidwilli and Brachyglottis bidwilli. His experiences in New Zealand saw him publish Rambles in New Zealand (1841). Bidwill returned to New South Wales, and sent the best of his New Zealand collection to John Lindley at the London Horticultural Society. Lindley did not publish Bidwill's work, and credited Ernst Diefenbach instead with his Bidwill's discoveries (Bidwill was to receive posthumous recognition).

John Bidwill returned to New Zealand in 1840 with his brother to build up the family business, and to continue his explorations and expand his botanical collection. Specimens from this period are kept at the Hooker Herbarium, Kew Gardens. Bidwill returned to Sydney in 1841 and worked with Joseph Hooker son of the eminent botanist. Colonial Secretary Alexander Mcleay also requested during this period that Bidwill undertake the collection of native fruits for study.

In furtherance of family business John Bidwill travelled to Moreton Bay in 1841, and began exploring to the north. He climbed the Glass House Mountains, and described a jasmine found on Mount Beerwah. It was known for a short time as Jasminum Bidwillii. Bidwill had also established a close relationship with the King and MacArthur families, and described and named a small orchid Dendrobium kingianum, which was named in honour of his friend Phillip Parker King. In 1841 Bidwill began work as an assistant in the Sydney Botanical Gardens, and also became a member of the Australia Club. Bidwill sailed to England in 1843, auctioneering off botanical specimens collected in Australia, as well as his gladioli hybrids.

Bidwill returned to Australia in 1844, in company with his other sister Mary. On his return voyage he brought back to Australia specimens of bananas, apples, passionfruit and apricots. After his return he established his own nursery (thought to have been at Camden). Examples of his camellias are still grown in the Camden area. He also continued his experimentation on hybridising gladioli. Later in 1844 he again returned to New Zealand, sailing on to Tahiti. He attempted to establish a passionfruit plantation in Tahiti, which failed. He sent living examples of Tahitian orchids to England, but these were misdirected and sent instead to his father.

Bidwill was appointed in mid 1847 to the position of Government Botanist and Director of the Sydney Botanical Gardens, by Colonial Secretary Earl Grey. Charles Moore was appointed to this position as a result of a bureaucratic mistake in London, and arrived to take up this position in January 1848. Bidwill acted in the capacity of Botanist and Director until the end of 1847. Bidwill then took his case to the Governor and requested that he be considered for any Crown Lands Commissioner's position then being created. He was appointed Commissioner for Crown Lands in November 1848 and confirmed Commissioner for the Wide Bay region. Bidwill travelled from Sydney to Brisbane on the Tamar arriving at Wide Bay village in December 1848.

Bidwill after his arrival established a residence for himself on the banks of Tinana Creek, near the junction of the Mary River and the creek. His residence was some six kilometres down stream from the Wide Bay village. The village itself was renamed Maryborough in 1849, and subsequently proclaimed a township on 2 February 1851. Bidwill had erected for himself a cottage, stables and a barracks for his assistants in the Crown Lands work.

The name Tinana, given by Bidwill to his residence and gardens as well as the creek nearby, is thought to have been inspired by the Maori leader Tinanah. The garden that Bidwill established was extensive, and during his time as Commissioner, Bidwill continued to collect and grow botanical specimen's as well as to experiment and grow fruit and vegetable plants. He continued forwarding plants to Kew Gardens. Bidwill however was unable to act as an efficient administrator in his job as Crown Lands Commissioner.

In July 1849 Bidwill was involved in an altercation with John Daniel Mactaggart of Kilkivan station, a result of a remark made by Bidwill accusing him of selling sly grog to his workers. Mactaggart challenged Bidwill to a duel, which was refused. Mactaggart struck Bidwill with a stock whip demanding satisfaction. A charge of assault was brought against Mactaggart by Bidwill, and the case was heard in Brisbane in May 1850. Mactaggart was found guilty and sentenced to imprisonment.

Bidwill was noted as sometimes exhibiting irrational behaviour during his term as Crown Lands Commissioner. He was considered a "harsh master", and disciplinarian. An employee of Bidwill's, George Dart who was later to become a well known identity in the commerce and social life of Maryborough claimed that Bidwill resorted on one occasion to purchasing and setting a man trap to halt the stealing of poultry, gardens and livestock by local Aboriginal groups.

According to Dart the trap did catch an Aboriginal raiding the house garden, and the extent of injuries led to the "mercy" killing of the individual by one of Bidwill's workers. Bidwill himself shot at local Aboriginals on several occasions in an attempt to prevent their pilfering. On another occasion Bidwill chose not to intervene in the murder of a local Aboriginal that was committed by a settler George Fueber in the Maryborough settlement. The shooting was witnessed by Bidwill outside of Richard Palmer's Inn. He chose not to act intervene in the matter despite the fact that he was Chief Magistrate for the Wide Bay, and was therefore responsible for policing.

Bidwill's property featured two gardens, the larger was at the junction of Tinana Creek and the Mary River. This featured most of the botanic and fruit specimens. The Commissioner's living quarters were situated at a higher elevation to the west of the "lower garden" and featured a "house garden" supplying pumpkins, sweet potatoes and yams.

In 1852 he was ordered to mark a tree line for the use of drays, and to speed up the transport of prisoners from Maryborough to Brisbane. A more circuitous route then in use required five days of travelling between the two centres. Bidwill set out with horses and a dray from Tinana Creek and five other men. They cut a straight track through to Tahiti station, near Tiaro. Along the watershed of Tinana Creek the party followed a spur that divided Tinana Creek from the Mary River, and then travelled through the area of what later became Gympie. A temporary bridge was built over the Mary River in this area, and during its construction Bidwill was credited by George Dart with locating traces of gold, fifteen years before James Nash found the Gympie gold field.

The party then proceeded further south in the direction of the Glasshouse Mountains marking the tree line. The party came across evidence of the remains of the large scale killing of a stolen flock of sheep taken from Marodian station near Miva. The group camped near this location for several days, when the cook of the party informed Bidwill that rations were running short. Bidwill believing that the party were near Durundur station decided to cut through the scrub with an assistant, Slade, to get rations.

Both men's rations were exhausted in two days. For the next sixteen days Bidwill and Slade existed off snails, and edible roots identified by Bidwill. A party of Aboriginals rescued the starving men near Durundur station. The privations of the eighteen days, including eight without food severely affected Bidwill's health. Bidwill stayed for several weeks recuperating, before setting off for Brisbane in weakened state. Doctors in Brisbane sent him on to Sydney for further treatment. He returned to Maryborough, but despite the attendance of three doctors, one from Gayndah and two from Maryborough, died on the 16 March 1853 at the age of 38. He was buried amongst the plants of his botanical garden ("lower garden"). Cause of death was attributed to a severe kidney complaint.

A bunya pine was planted at each corner of his grave to mark its position. His brother Charles came from New Zealand to collect his personal effects, all other items of Bidwill's were auctioned. In 1854 Sir Charles Moore and Walter Hill (curator of Brisbane Botanical Gardens) made a collection of specimens from Bidwill's garden. Surviving trees from the collection are thought to be a bunya pine and sausage tree in Queen's Park, Maryborough. Other specimens were sent to Brisbane, Rockhampton and Ipswich.

A lychee tree thought to be a surviving specimen from Bidwill's "lower" garden survives near the bank of Tinana Creek, approximately 30 metres (98 ft) from the grave. Conservation work was carried out on this headstone in 1988. A sandstone headstone identifies the grave.

John Carne Bidwill despite his enthusiasm and drive for botanical collecting and study is today largely an unknown figure in the history of Queensland, New South Wales and in the history of the South Pacific. The suburb of Bidwill in Maryborough, and a Parish near Maryborough are named after him, as well as the suburb of Bidwill in Sydney. Ten Australian and three New Zealand plant species are also named after him. Altogether thirty plants carry his name.

== Description ==
Commissioner Bidwill's Grave is located on a rise, adjoining a sugar cane paddock, to the south of the junction of Tinana Creek and the Mary River, adjacent to Cran Road, Tinana.

The grave has a gabled sandstone headstone, with two large diagonal breaks, which has been reconstructed with a compressed fibrous cement sheet fixed to the back and a concrete base.

A lychee tree is located to the west of the grave.

== Heritage listing ==
Commissioner Bidwill's Grave was listed on the Queensland Heritage Register on 30 April 1997 having satisfied the following criteria.

The place is important in demonstrating the evolution or pattern of Queensland's history.

The Commissioner for Crown Lands John Carne Bidwill's grave, located near the junction of Tinana Creek and the Mary River adjacent to Cran Road, is important in demonstrating the growth of the Wide Bay district and the role of the first Commissioner for Crown Lands in the pre-separation period of Queensland history. It also marks the burial location of the first person commissioned to mark a new direct tree line for transport between the Maryborough-Wide Bay area and Brisbane replacing a more circuitous route via the Brisbane Valley. The grave and adjacent Lychee tree are the last surviving evidence of the residence and gardens that Bidwill created during the period of 1849–52 during his appointment as Crown Lands Commissioner in the Wide Bay district. Bidwill chose to establish his living quarters six kilometres downstream from the original village of Wide Bay and named the creek junctioning with the Mary River at this location, Tinana. He also established a large botanical garden for the growing of specimen plants on the property. Bidwill himself was an active and prolific collector and grower of botanical specimens, as well as hybridiser of flowering plants. Specimens collected by him during travels in Australia, New Zealand and the South Pacific are kept in the Kew Gardens collection.

The place has a special association with the life or work of a particular person, group or organisation of importance in Queensland's history.

The grave marks the burial location of the first Commissioner for Crown Lands appointed to the Wide Bay region in 1849, John Carne Bidwill. In the early years of the Wide Bay area (1849–52) Bidwill played an important role in its establishment. As the Crown Lands commissioner his duties included administration of the licences issued for Crown Lands, but also acting as Police Magistrate, Harbour Master, and registrar for Births, Deaths and Marriages. After his death in 1853 Bidwill was buried in the botanical garden he created, of which reportedly only one fruit tree, a Lychee, remains.
