= John Carne Bidwill =

English botanist (1815–1853)

John Bidwill
- Born: John Carne Bidwill; 5 February 1815; St. Thomas, Exeter, England
- Died: 16 March 1853 (aged 38); Tinana, Maryborough, Queensland
- Scientific career
- Fields: Botany
- Workplaces: Royal Botanic Gardens, Sydney
- Author abbrev. (botany): Bidwill

John Carne Bidwill (5 February 1815 – 16 March 1853) was an English botanist who documented plant life in New Zealand and Australia. He is attributed with the discovery of several Australian plant species.

== Life in England ==
Bidwill was born at St. Thomas, Exeter, England, the eldest son of Joseph Green Bidwill, a merchant from Exeter and Charlotte, née Carne. He sailed to Canada in April 1832 at 17 years of age, returning in November 1834.

== Migration ==
On 30 August 1838 John Bidwill arrived in Sydney, New South Wales, on the barque Arachne. He entered into a partnership with William Tucker and the pair traded as shipping agents and merchants under the name W. Tucker & Co.He was sent to New Zealand and arrived at the Bay of Islands on 5 February 1839. He went on an expedition into North Island to collect specimens. He sent the plants he collected to John Lindley, although Lindley never published them. As part of his journey, Bidwill ascended Mount Ngauruhoe and for many years, it had been believed that this was the first significant European climb of a New Zealand mountain. However, it is now acknowledged that Mount Sparrman in Fiordland was the first ascent by Europeans; this happened in 1773 as part of the second voyage of James Cook. Whilst that his is much lower at 969 metres (3,179 ft), the degree of difficulty is about the same.

Richard Clough considers Bidwill was the first to introduce plant breeding to Australia. Bidwill worked with both native and exotic plants, and in 1843, he released his first hybrid, which was a hybrid between two Australian plants – Hibiscus splendens and H. heterophyllus – which he named ‘Hibiscus Sydneyi’. The hybrid belladonna lilies derived from Amaryllis belladonna and Brunsvigia spp., which are now grown all over the world, were first raised by him in 1841.

== Public service ==
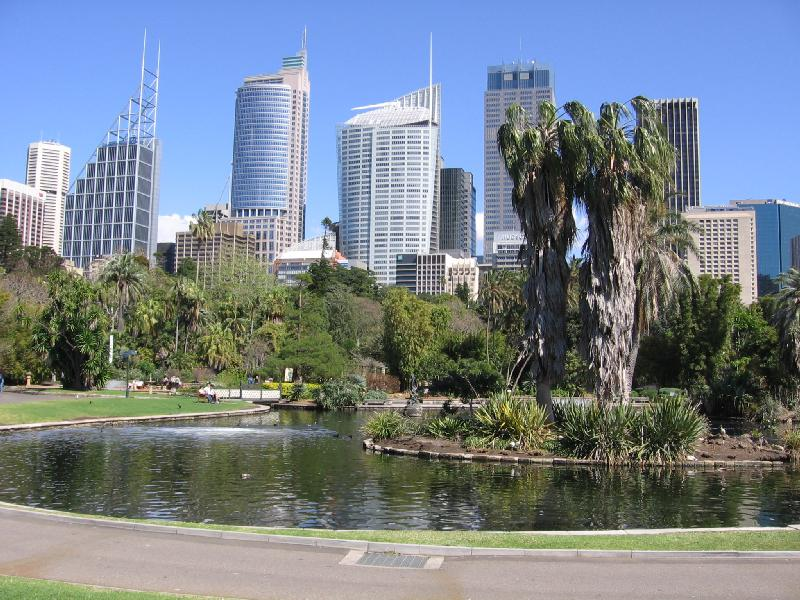
Sydney Royal Botanic Gardens, 2006

Arriving in Wellington, NZ, on 13 May 1842 on the brig Agnes, after a 12 day voyage from Sydney, he was the first to successfully introduce a hive of honey bees which he delivered to Col. William Wakefield. As a member of the Australian Club from August 1841,he was well placed to come into contact with honey bee interested parties, such as Thomas Icely and A.B. Spark. Bidwill sailed to England on 2 February 1843 on the barque Cheverell, and returned to Sydney on 23 March 1844 aboard the barque Arachne, after an absence of some 14 months. He spent a year from February 1845 in Tahiti. Bidwill became temporary government botanist on 1 September 1847 and inaugural Director of Sydney's botanic gardens. The gardens were established in 1816 and until that time had been supervised by colonial botanists and superintendents. Bidwill was succeeded by the permanent Director Charles Moore.

== Plant discoveries ==
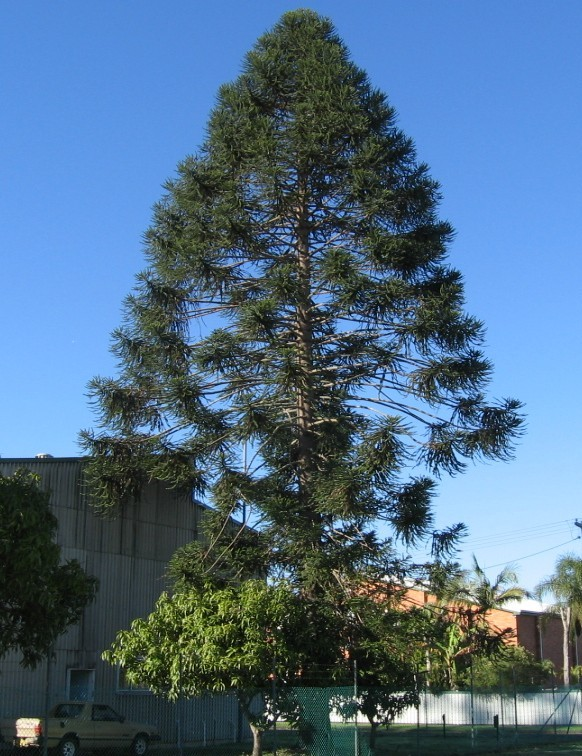
Araucaria bidwillii

The Bunya Pine was discovered by Andrew Petrie in 1838 who later brought notice of it to Bidwill. The bunya was initially known as Pinus petriana. Some time after May 1842 Bidwill visited the Moreton Bay region to look for specimens of this tree. At Kilcoy he met Henry Stuart Russell who assisted him in locating and acquiring specimens of the tree, which included three seedlings, branches, and male and female cones. In October 1842 his paper “On a new Species of Araucaria from about forty miles N.W. of Moreton Bay, NSW” was published in The Tasmanian journal of natural science, agriculture, statistics, etc. In 1843 Bidwill brought live specimens housed in a Wardian case to London where it was studied and named Araucaria bidwillii after him by English botanist William Jackson Hooker in the 1843 London Journal of Botany. Bidwill also is credited with discovery of Agathis robusta (the Dammara or Queensland kauri pine) and the Nymphaea gigantea.

== Death ==
During a surveying expedition in the Moreton Bay district in 1851, Bidwill spent eight days lost in the bush. While he eventually found his way out and was rescued, he never fully recovered from the ordeal and died on 16 March 1853 at Tinana, at 38 years of age. His grave at Cran Road, Tinana, has been listed on the Queensland Heritage Register. A bunya pine was planted at each corner of his grave to mark its position.

His brother Charles Bidwill came from New Zealand to collect his personal effects, all other items of Bidwill's were auctioned. In 1854 Sir Charles Moore and Walter Hill (curator of Brisbane Botanical Gardens) made a collection of specimens from Bidwill's personal garden. Surviving trees from the collection are thought to be a bunya pine and sausage tree in Queen's Park, Maryborough. Other specimens were sent to Brisbane, Rockhampton and Ipswich.

== Legacy ==
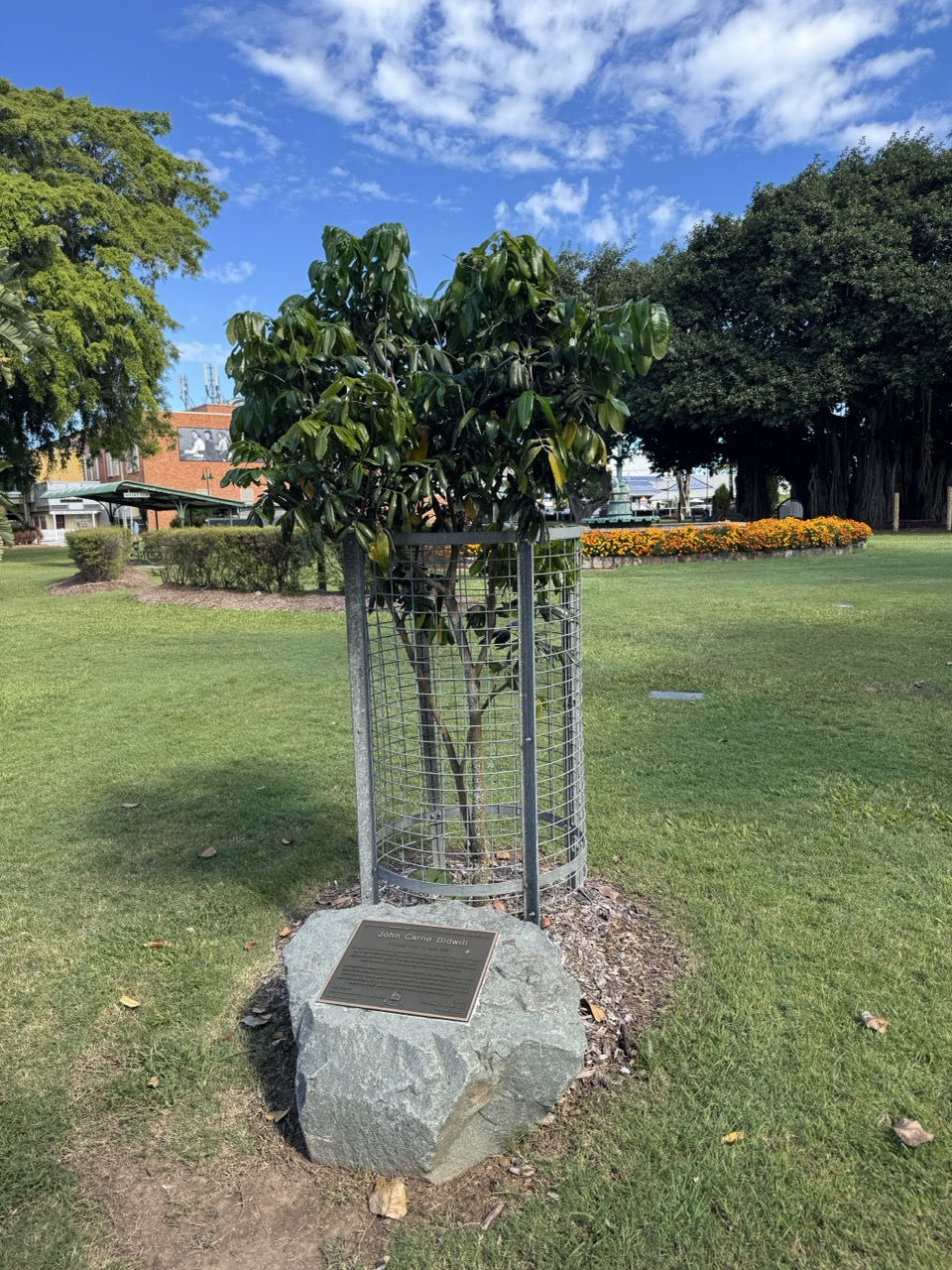
A longan tree planted in Queen's Park to commemorate the 200th anniversary of the birth of John Carne Bidwill

In addition to Araucaria bidwillii, scientific name for the bunya bunya tree, Bidwill is remembered in the name of the City of Blacktown suburb, Bidwill, New South Wales. In Queensland, a parish, a locality and a creek also bear his name, in recognition of his term as Commissioner for Crown Lands, Wide Bay.

Ten Australian and three New Zealand plant species, including Sannantha bidwillii, are also named after him. Altogether thirty plants carry his name. A full listing can be found in Mabberley, D.J. (1996).

On 5 February 2015 a longan tree, grown from a seed from a tree in his collection, was planted in Queen's Park, Maryborough by Fraser Coast mayor George Seymour to commemorate the bicentenary of Bidwill's birth.

== See also ==
- Commissioner Bidwill's Grave
