= Anders Sparrman =

Swedish naturalist (1748–1820)

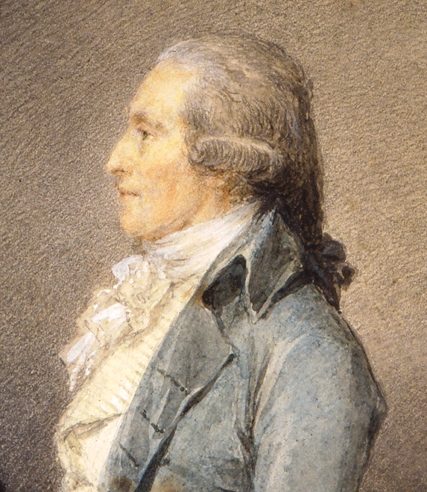
- Born: 27 February 1748; Tensta, Uppland, Sweden
- Died: 9 August 1820 (aged 72); Stockholm
- Education: Uppsala University
- Known for: A voyage to the Cape of Good Hope, towards the Antarctic polar circle, and round the world: But chiefly into the country of the Hottentots and Caffres, from the year 1772 to 1776
- Scientific career
- Fields: Botany, Zoology
- Academic advisors: Carl Linnaeus
- Author abbrev. (botany): Sparrm.
- Author abbrev. (zoology): Sparrman

Anders Sparrman (27 February 1748 – 9 August 1820) was a Swedish naturalist, abolitionist and an apostle of Carl Linnaeus.

== Biography ==
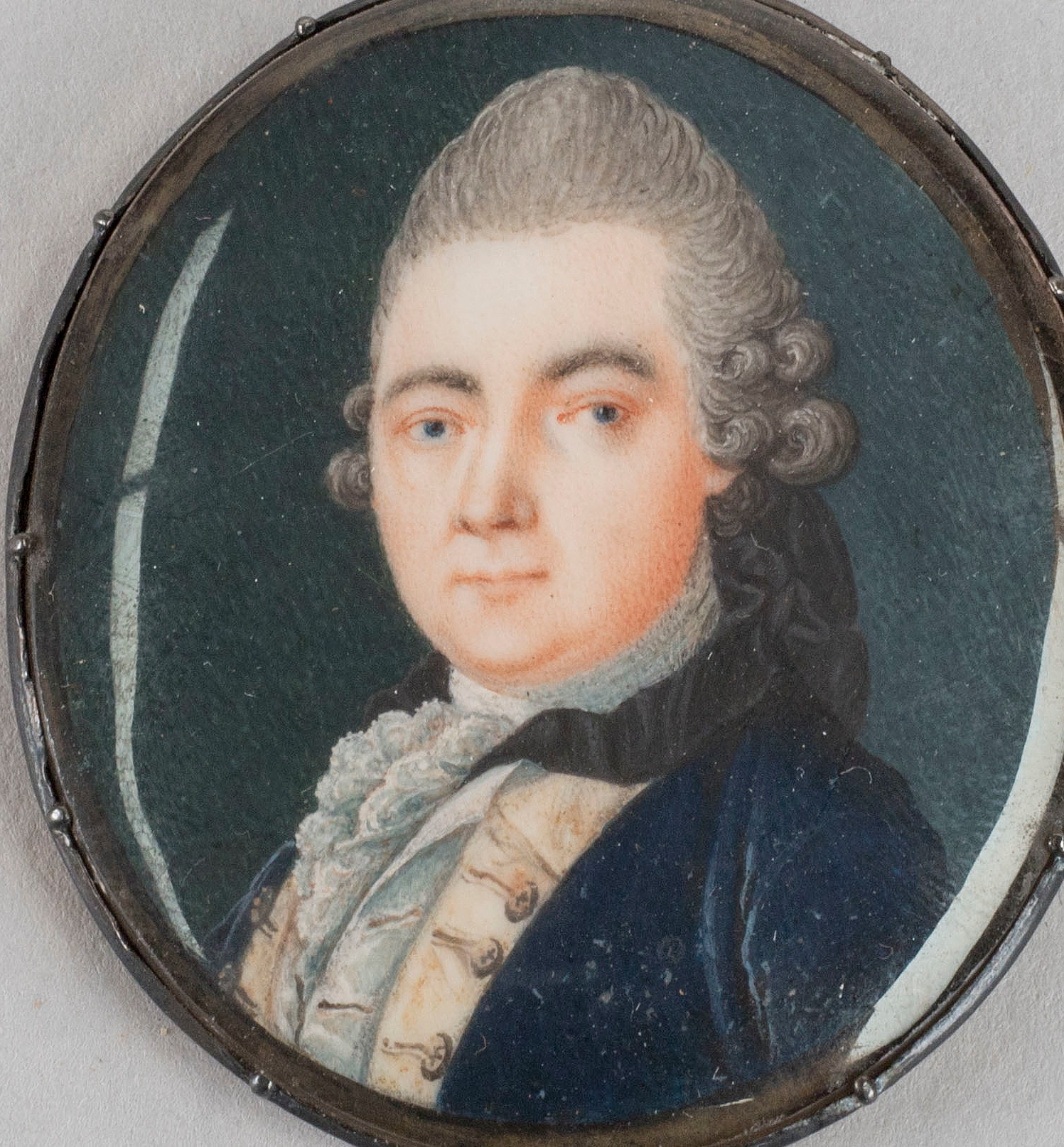
Miniature of Sparrman at the time of his travels with James Cook. By unknown artist.

Born in Tensta, Uppland, Sparrman was the son of a clergyman. At the age of nine he enrolled at Uppsala University, beginning medical studies at fourteen and becoming one of the outstanding pupils of Linnaeus. In 1765 he went on a voyage to China as ship's doctor, returning two years later and describing the animals and plants he had encountered. On this voyage he met Carl Gustaf Ekeberg.

He sailed for the Cape of Good Hope in January 1772 to do natural history research, supporting himself by tutoring children. When James Cook arrived there later in the year at the start of his second voyage, Sparrman was taken on as assistant naturalist to Johann and Georg Forster. After the voyage he returned to Cape Town in July 1775 and practiced medicine, earning enough to finance a journey into the interior. He was guided by Daniel Ferdinand Immelman, the young frontiersman who had previously guided the Swedish botanist Carl Peter Thunberg. Daniel and Sparrman reached the Great Fish River and returned in April 1776.

In 1776 Sparrman returned to Sweden, where he had been awarded an honorary doctorate in his absence. He was also elected a member of the Royal Swedish Academy of Sciences in 1777. He was appointed keeper of the natural historical collections of the Academy of Sciences in 1780, Professor of natural history and pharmacology in 1781 and assessor of the Collegium Medicum in 1790. In 1790 he was elected to the American Philosophical Society. In 1787 he took part in an expedition to West Africa, but this was not successful.

== Published works ==
Sparrman published several works, the best known of which is his account of his travels in South Africa and with Cook, published in English as A voyage to the Cape of Good Hope, towards the Antarctic polar circle, and round the world: But chiefly into the country of the Hottentots and Caffres, from the year 1772 to 1776 (1789). He also published a Catalogue of the Museum Carlsonianum (1786–89), in which he described many of the specimens he had collected in South Africa and the South Pacific, some of which were new to science. He published an Ornithology of Sweden in 1806.

- Sparrman, Anders (1975) [1789]. V. S. Forbes (ed.). A Voyage to the Cape of Good Hope, towards the Antarctic Polar Circle, round the world and to the Country of the Hottentots and the Caffres, from the Year 1772–1776. Cape Town: Van Riebeeck Society.

== Legacy ==
The asteroid 16646 Sparrman bears his name. In New Zealand, he is commemorated by Mount Sparrman. The Swedish novelist Per Wästberg has written a biographical novel about Sparrman which was published in English in 2010, under the title as The Journey of Anders Sparrman. Anders Erikson Sparrman is denoted by the author abbreviation Sparrm. when citing a botanical name.

== See also ==
- European and American voyages of scientific exploration
