= Ferney, Queensland =

Ferney
- Suburb
- Interactive map of Ferney
- Coordinates: 25.6108°S 152.6205°E
- Country: Australia
- State: Queensland
- LGA: Fraser Coast Region
- Location: 11.8 km (7.3 mi) SW of Maryborough; 44.9 km (27.9 mi) SW of Hervey Bay; 243 km (151 mi) N of Brisbane

Government
  - State electorate: Maryborough
  - Federal division: Wide Bay

Area
  - Total: 8.0 km^{2} (3.1 sq mi)

Population
  - Total: 93 (2021 census)
  - Density: 11.63/km^{2} (30.1/sq mi)
- Time zone: UTC+10:00 (AEST)
- Postcode: 4650
Suburbs around Ferney
Mungar	Tinana South	Tinana South
Mungar	Ferney	Glenorchy
Antigua	Antigua	Glenorchy

Ferney is a rural locality in the Fraser Coast Region, Queensland, Australia. In the 2021 census, Ferney had a population of 93 people.

== Geography ==
The Mary River forms the western boundary.

The land use is a mixture of grazing on native vegetation and crop growing (mostly sugarcane).

== Demographics ==
In the 2016 census, Ferney had a population of 85 people.

In the 2021 census, Ferney had a population of 93 people.

== Education ==
There are no schools in Ferney. The nearest government primary school is Parke State School in Tinana South to the north-east. The nearest government secondary school is Maryborough State High School in Maryborough to the north-east. There are also a number of non-government schools in Maryborough.
