= Tinana State School =

Coordinates: 25°33′29.5″S 152°40′05″E

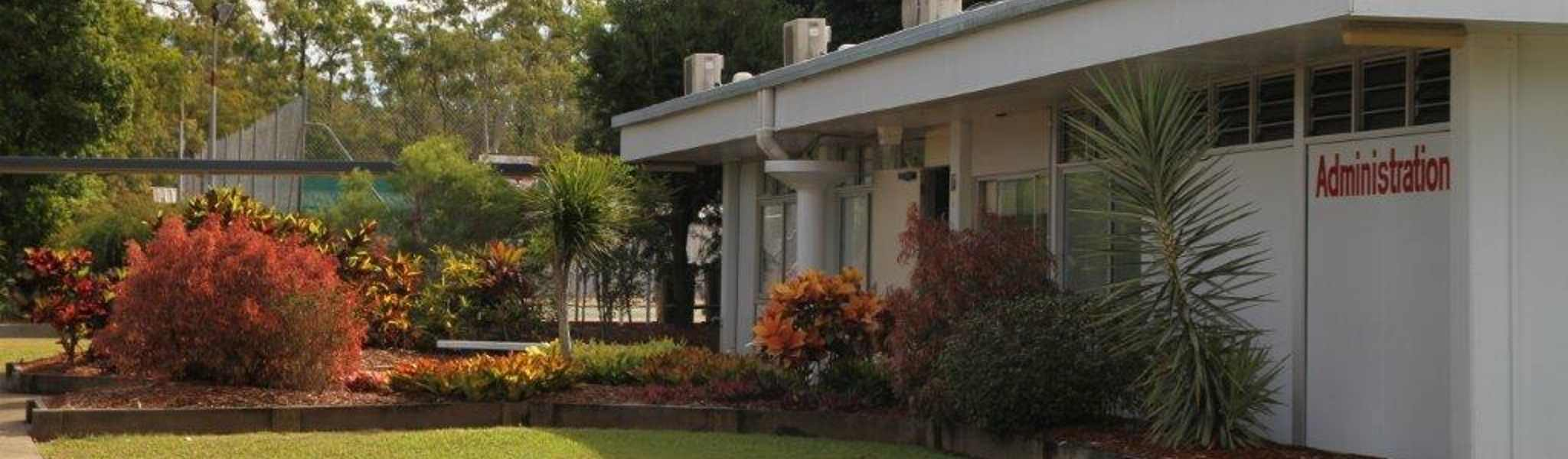
- Administration building
- Gympie Rd; Maryborough, Queensland 4650; Australia

Information
- Type: Public
- Motto: Do Your Best
- Established: 1875
- School district: Wide Bay South
- Principal: David Burns
- Grades: P to 7
- Enrolment: 509 (2015)
- Colours: Red and black
- Rivals: Maryborough Central State School, Maryborough West State School, Granville State School, Riverside Christian College
- Website: tinanass.eq.edu.au

Tinana State School is a public primary school located in the suburb of Tinana in Maryborough, Queensland, Australia. The school is run by the Queensland State Government and was one of the first public schools to be established in Queensland. The school colours are red and black.

== History ==
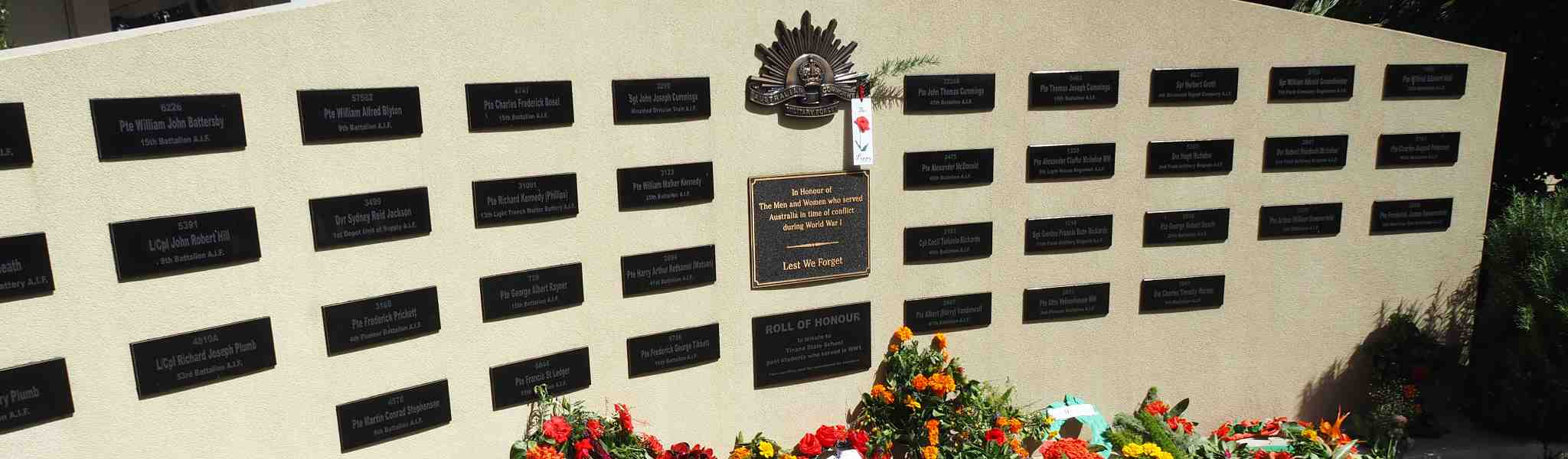
War memorial, 2019

Tinana State School was opened on 31 May 1875 with an enrolment of 47 students. The school was established on 36 acres (150,000 m^{2}) of land, 16 acres being set aside for a horse paddock for the students. The school grounds were large for their time as schools were commonly allotted 2 acres (8,100 m^{2}) of land.

On 25 April (Anzac Day) 2015, as part of the World War I centenary, a war memorial was officially unveiled at the school. It commemorates former students who served in World War I.

== Location ==
The school is located on Gympie Rd in Tinana, Maryborough, Queensland.

== Facilities ==
The school has a number of sporting facilities including a multipurpose court, cricket pitch, cricket nets, sport equipment borrowing sheds and a very large and spacious oval, including the Neil Ottaway Oval which is levelled and irrigated. The school has a computer lab with network and internet access. A school library with a range of books and resources is available to the students. Tinana State School has a rainforest, with new trees added regularly.

== Sport ==
There are two major sporting events between different sports houses during the year. Cross Country and Athletics Carnival. The school is divided into three houses:

Chappell (Green)
Laver (Yellow)
Whickham (Blue)

Students are randomly assigned a position in houses, unless a sibling currently attends the school they are assigned a position in the same house.
