= Mount Sparrman =

Mountain in Fiordland, New Zealand

- Location within New Zealand
- Interactive map of Mount Sparrman

Highest point
- Elevation: 969 m (3,179 ft)
- Prominence: 128 m (420 ft)
- Coordinates: 45°48′11″S 166°38′17″E

Naming
- Etymology: Anders Sparrman

Geography
- Location: South Island
- Country: New Zealand
- Region: Southland
- Protected area: Fiordland National Park; Te Wahipounamu
- Parent range: Kākāpō Range
- Topo map: NZMS260 B44

Climbing
- First ascent: 1773

Mount Sparrman is a 969-metre-elevation (3,179-foot) hill in Fiordland, New Zealand. The hill is notable as the first peak in New Zealand climbed by Europeans; this happened in 1773 as part of the second voyage of James Cook.

== Description ==
Mount Sparrman is a hill south of Cook Channel, which is part of Tamatea / Dusky Sound. This peak is located in Fiordland National Park and Te Wahipounamu. Precipitation runoff from the hill drains north-west to Tamatea / Dusky Sound and south-east to a lake that eventually flows into Taiari / Chalky Inlet via Lumaluma Creek. The Mount Sparrman–South Peak is an informal name for a nearby hill at an elevation of 1,026 metres (3,366 ft). Topographic prominence is 128 metres (420 ft).

== First ascent ==
(Cascade Cove) Dusky Bay by William Hodges

The hill is notable as the first peak in New Zealand climbed by Europeans – it was scaled on 23 April 1773 by a party of four who belonged to the second voyage of James Cook. Three of the party's names are known: Anders Sparrman (1748–1820), Richard Pickersgill (1749–1779), and Joseph Gilbert (1732–1831). It is believed that the fourth person was an able seaman who may have acted as a porter. Georg Forster and his father Johann were supposed to be part of the trip, but they were both sick that day.

The Resolution had already been in Tamatea / Dusky Sound for five weeks before the ascent. James Cook had decided to give his crew a rest period. They anchored in what they called Cascade Cove based on "a large magnificent waterfall", and that waterfall was later painted by William Hodges. (Note: The Māori family shown in Hodges' painting was met in a different location at Cascade Cove; not at the waterfall.) The route chosen to Mount Sparrman was beside this waterfall. (Note: The waterway that the waterfall is part of has not been named by the New Zealand Geographic Board.) When the party reached the top, which was above the tree line, they set fire to the dry grass to signify the occasion.

For many years, it had been believed that the first significant European climb of a New Zealand mountain was John Bidwill's ascent of Mount Ngauruhoe in 1839, but the degree of difficulty between Mount Sparrman and Mount Ngauruhoe is similar.

The mountain's toponym honours Sparrman (1748–1820), who was a scientist on the Resolution.

== Climate ==
Based on the Köppen climate classification, Mount Sparrman is located in a marine west coast climate zone (Cfb). Prevailing westerly winds blow moist air from the Tasman Sea onto the mountains, where the air is forced upwards by the mountains (orographic lift), causing moisture to drop in the form of rain and snow. The months of December through February offer the most favourable weather for viewing or climbing this peak.
