= Emily Bulcock =

Australian poet and journalist

Emily Bulcock OBE
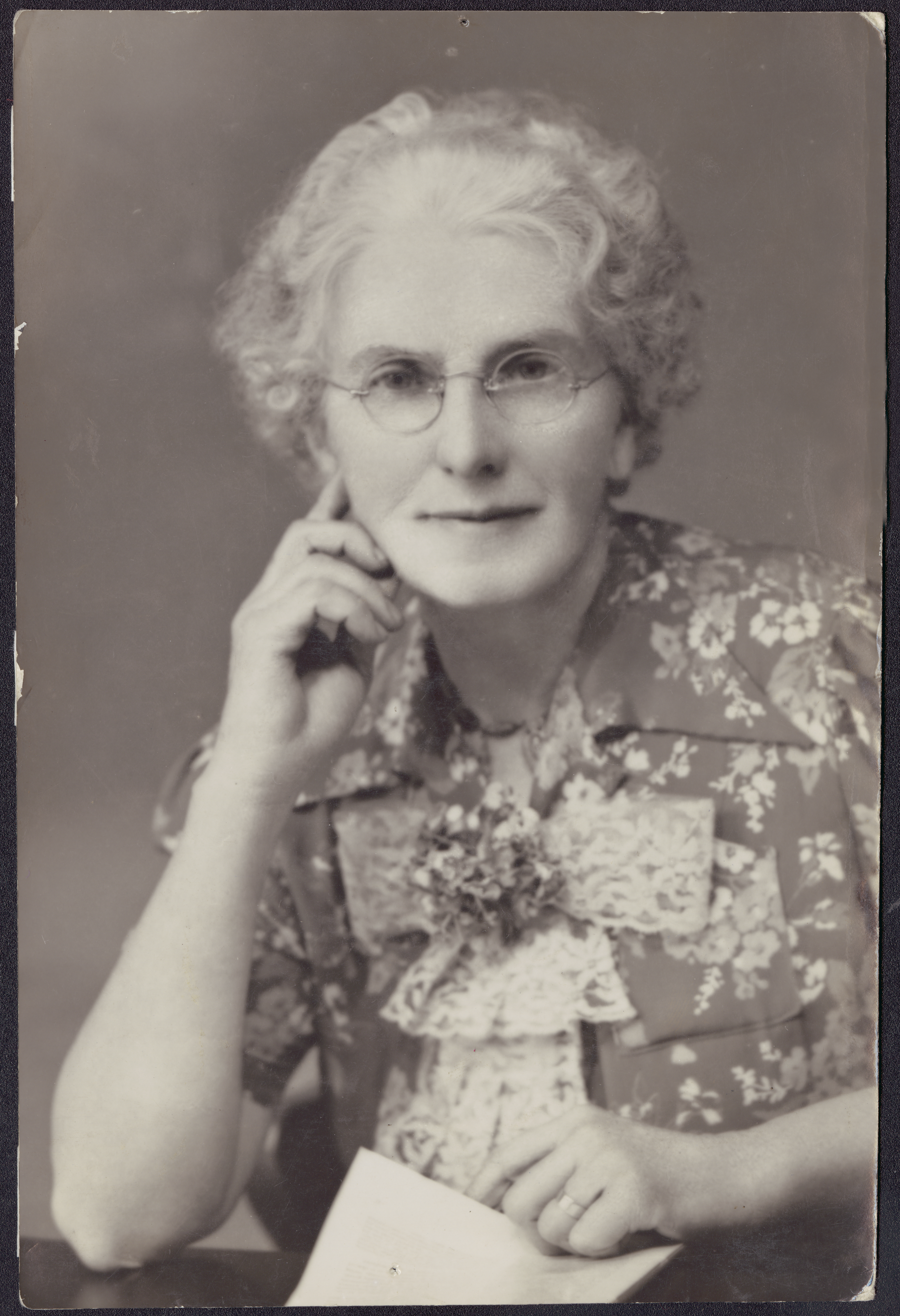
- Emily Bulcock
- Born: Emily Hemans Palmer; 28 July 1877; Tinana, Queensland, Australia
- Died: 4 September 1969 (aged 92); Brisbane, Queensland, Australia
- Occupations: Poet, journalist
- Relatives: Vance Palmer (brother)
- Writing career
- Years active: 1889–1969

Emily Hemans Bulcock (née Palmer) OBE (1877–1969) was an Australian poet and journalist.

== Career ==
She contributed poetry to newspapers throughout her life, beginning with a poem published by The Queenslander newspaper when she was aged 11.

Bulcock was appointed teacher at a newly built school at Blackall in 1896 where she remained until she resigned as headmistress shortly before her marriage in 1903.

In the 1920s she worked as a freelance journalist for the Graziers' Journal and Farmers' Gazette.

Bulcock was a foundation member of the Queensland Authors' and Artists' Association, subsequently renamed the Fellowship of Australian Writers (Queensland). She served on its committee from 1925 and was elected vice president in 1936. She was granted life membership in 1965. She was also a foundation member of the Queensland branch of the Country Women's Association.

== Honours and recognition ==
Bulcock was appointed an Officer of the Order of the British Empire (OBE) in the 1964 New Year's Day Honours for “service to literature and poetry”.

Emily Bulcock Crescent, in the Canberra suburb of Gilmore, is named in her honour.

== Works ==
=== Poetry ===
- Jacaranda Blooms and other poems, Queensland Book Depot (1923)
- From Quenchless Springs: New poems, Economy Printers Pty. Ltd. (1944)
- From Australia to Britain and other specially selected poems, W.R. Smith & Paterson (1961)

=== Nonfiction ===
- Queensland's Wonderland of National Parks, Lands Department, Queensland (1932)

== Personal ==
Emily Hemans Palmer was born on 28 July 1877 at Tinana (near Maryborough), the daughter of Henry Burnett Palmer and his wife Mary Jane (née Carson).

Bulcock married Robert Albert Bulcock at St Paul's Church, Cleveland in Queensland on 13 April 1903.

Bulcock died in Brisbane on 4 September 1969 and was cremated. Her husband predeceased her in 1924. She was survived by her two children, Roy Palmer Bulcock and Marjorie Isabel Puregger (née Bulcock).
