= Glenorchy, Queensland =

Glenorchy
- Suburb
- Interactive map of Glenorchy
- Coordinates: 25.6233°S 152.64°E
- Country: Australia
- State: Queensland
- LGA: Fraser Coast Region
- Location: 13.1 km (8.1 mi) SW of Maryborough; 46.2 km (28.7 mi) SW of Hervey Bay; 238 km (148 mi) N of Brisbane

Government
  - State electorate: Maryborough
  - Federal division: Wide Bay

Area
  - Total: 12.2 km^{2} (4.7 sq mi)

Population
  - Total: 84 (2021 census)
  - Density: 6.89/km^{2} (17.83/sq mi)
- Time zone: UTC+10:00 (AEST)
- Postcode: 4650
Suburbs around Glenorchy
Tinana South	Tinana South	Tinana South
Ferney	Glenorchy	Teddington
Antigua	Owanyilla	Teddington

Glenorchy is a rural locality in the Fraser Coast Region, Queensland, Australia. In the 2021 census, Glenorchy had a population of 84 people.

== Geography ==
The Bruce Highway passes through the locality from north (Tinana South) to south (Owanyilla).

The locality's south-western corner abuts the Mary River . A number of small creeks have their source in the locality; all of which are tributaries directly or indirectly of the Mary River.

The principal land use is irrigated cropping, principally sugarcane. There is also grazing on native vegetation.

== Demographics ==
In the 2016 census, Glenorchy had a population of 83 people.

In the 2021 census, Glenorchy had a population of 84 people.

== Education ==
There are no schools in Glenorchy. The nearest government primary school is Parke State School in Tinana South to the north-east. The nearest government secondary school is Maryborough State High School in Maryborough to the north-east.
