= Pacific Islander Hospital and Cemetery site =

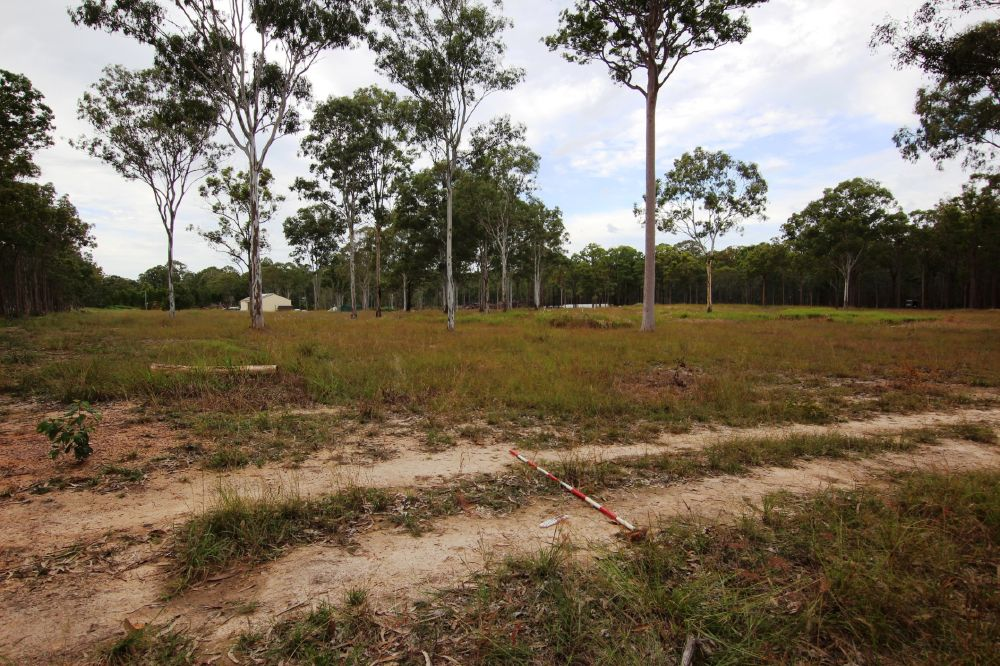
- Pacific Islander Hospital and Cemetery site from the north-west, 2017

- Location within Queensland
- 25.5556°S 152.6570°E
- Location: corner of Bluebell Road East and Gernich Road, Tinana, Fraser Coast Region, Queensland, Australia

History
- Design period: 1870s–1890s (Late 19th century)
- Built: 1883–1888, 1883–1888, 1883

Queensland Heritage Register
- Official name: Pacific Islander Hospital and Cemetery site, Tinana; South Sea Islander Hospital and Cemetery site, Tinana; Pacific Islander Hospital, Maryborough site
- Type: state heritage
- Designated: 27 October 2017
- Reference no.: 650053
- Type: Archaeological: Archaeological potential; Archaeological: Artefact scatter; Burial ground: Cemetery – private; Health and care services: Hospital – other
- Theme: Providing health and welfare services: Providing health services

Pacific Islander Hospital and Cemetery site is a heritage-listed archaeological site of a former hospital and private cemetery at the corner of Bluebell Road East and Gernich Road, Tinana, Fraser Coast Region, Queensland, Australia. It was built from 1883 to 1888. It is also known as Pacific Islander Hospital and Cemetery site, South Sea Islander Hospital and Cemetery site, and Pacific Islander Hospital, Maryborough. It was added to the Queensland Heritage Register on 27 October 2017.

== History ==
The Pacific Islander Hospital and Cemetery site at Tinana, formerly named the Pacific Islander Hospital, Maryborough, and originally comprising 13.18 hectares (32.6 acres), is situated between Iindah, Genrich and Bluebird Roads, at Tinana, approximately 5.5 kilometres (3.4 mi) southwest of Maryborough. The hospital officially opened on 19 December 1883 and closed on 31 December 1888. One of only four central hospitals built for the treatment of South Sea Islanders (then called Pacific Islanders or Polynesians), the site is a rare and important remnant of the response by the Queensland Government during the 1880s to the high death rate among indentured South Sea Islanders. The former "Polynesian Cemetery" site has the potential to yield new information that will contribute to a greater understanding of the role and treatment of indentured South Sea Islander workers in Queensland's history. The Pacific Islander Hospital and Cemetery site has a special association with South Sea Islanders who, as indentured workers, made an important contribution to the establishment of the Queensland sugar industry, and has a special association with their descendants.

The settlement of Maryborough in the traditional country of the Butchulla people, started in 1847 to serve the needs of the pastoral settlers in the district. Maryborough, with a population of 299, was declared a township in 1851. It was proclaimed a port of entry in 1859 and a municipality (the Borough of Maryborough) in 1861. From April 1861, land on the Mary River was sold for agricultural purposes, and by the end of the 1860s thousands of free immigrants had entered Queensland through the Port of Maryborough. Supplying the Gympie goldfields from 1867 further boosted Maryborough's growth.

Sugar cane was cultivated around Maryborough from the late 1860s. The first commercially viable sugar cane crop in Australia had been grown by Captain Louis Hope on his Ormiston House Estate at Ormiston, Queensland in 1862 and by 1864 he had established the first commercial sugar mill in Australia. Cultivated primarily on plantations, sugar cane production spread rapidly to coastal areas to the north, such as Maryborough, Mackay and Bundaberg, where the warmer climate proved more suitable.

A labour shortage existed in Queensland at the time and it was believed that labouring in the tropics was unhealthy for Europeans. Therefore, an inexpensive, non-European labour force was sought by cane plantation owners (planters). The use of South Sea Islander labour in Australia began in the 1840s when Benjamin Boyd employed them as shepherds in lieu of convict labourers in the Riverina District of New South Wales. The first group of South Sea Islanders brought to Queensland as indentured labour arrived at Brisbane on 14 August 1863 aboard Robert Towns' ship the Don Juan, and went to work on his cotton plantation, Townsvale (later Veresdale), on the Logan River. Captain Claudius Whish employed Islanders on his Oaklands property near Caboolture, as did Captain Louis Hope on his sugar plantation at Ormiston, near Cleveland.

South Sea Islanders made a major contribution to Queensland's early sugar industry. Between 1863 and 1904, approximately 50,000 Islanders were brought to Queensland as indentured labourers, generally employed on three-year contracts bound by the current Masters and Servants Act 1861. Most came from 80 islands in Melanesia, mainly those of present day Vanuatu and the Solomon Islands. They made a vital contribution to the sugar industry by performing virtually all of the associated field work during the first phase of the sugar industry's development. Most returned to their islands at the conclusion of their contract period.

The first South Sea Islanders employed in the Maryborough district arrived in November 1867 aboard the schooner Mary Smith, a month after the Gympie gold rush commenced. Most of this group of 84 men became employees of the Maryborough Sugar Company. The cost to employers of their travel to Maryborough was approximately £9 and their wages were £6 per annum (compared with wages for a European of £6 per month).

By March 1868, 2107 Islanders had been brought to Queensland, and were employed in various capacities including agricultural and pastoral work, and as servants in the towns. They lived and worked from Bowen to the Moreton Bay district, and west to Roma.

The need to protect South Sea Islanders from illegal practices became apparent soon after this trade in indentured labour from the islands arose. By 1868, there were reports that the recruitment of South Sea Islanders had devolved into kidnapping (known as blackbirding). At the least, there was coercion and deception involved in their hiring. The Polynesian Labourer Act 1868 was enacted to regulate recruitment. Under the Act, a government agent accompanied each recruiting ship to ensure all the regulations referred to in the Act were upheld, the Islanders were required to sign a contract for up to three years, and employers were required to pay them a minimum wage of £6 per year plus rations and pay for their return voyage home after completion of their contract. Deaths and desertions were reported to the nearest magistrate.

By 1870, sugar had become the third largest of Queensland's crops, by area of cultivation. In 1872, 56 mills in Queensland were producing more than 6,000 long tons (6,100 t) of sugar and 734,000 litres (161,000 imp gal; 194,000 US gal) of rum per year, and sugar was being exported to other colonies. The labour shortage remained acute and the entire industry would have collapsed without South Sea Islanders.

During the 1870s and 1880s there was ongoing public criticism and political debate about the use of South Sea Islander labour. Further Acts of Parliament were introduced to protect the Islanders from unscrupulous recruiters and employers. Inspectors of Polynesians were appointed to monitor Islanders' health and welfare. The first Inspector appointed to oversee Bundaberg and Maryborough was employed in 1875 and also acted as the sub-collector of customs.

Concerns continued to be raised about the living and working conditions, and the illness and death rates for South Sea Islanders. Complaints were made by successive Inspectors of Polynesians at Maryborough.

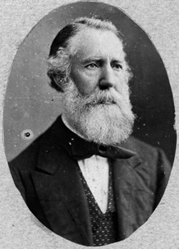
Richard Bingham Sheridan

In January 1876, Richard Bingham Sheridan, Inspector of Polynesians at Maryborough, reported to the Office of the Colonial Secretary that South Sea Islanders were experiencing both harsh treatment and poor living standards. He alleged that some planters were deterred from trying to diminish the death rate by the prospect of saving both the cost of the labourer's return passage and his accumulated wages if he died. As a result of Sheridan's charges, a select committee was established in September 1876 to investigate. Sheridan gave evidence about the medical neglect of the South Sea Islanders: "that medical attendance upon the Polynesians was greatly neglected; that there was no system of regular medical attendance; that numbers died without any medical man". Other witnesses, who were wealthy planters and Members of Parliament, reported favourably on the conditions for South Sea Islander employees. The investigation did not result in legislation for improved conditions.

Following Sheridan's resignation, Charles Horrocks became Inspector of Polynesians for Bundaberg and Maryborough from 1877. He regularly inspected South Sea Islander accommodation and clothing, and weighed their food rations. Instances of large numbers of Islanders dying on individual farms were investigated, with the worst examples being Robert Cran's Maryborough plantations of Yerra Yerra, Yengari and Irrewarra. In 1879, the death rate amongst South Sea Islanders in the Maryborough district was 7.4%, compared with 0.9% for similarly aged European men between 16 and 30 years. During the previous five years, Cran's estates had a mortality rate of 9.2%.

On 12 February 1880, the subsequent Inspector of Polynesians at Maryborough, Henry Reginald Buttenshaw, reported that Cran & Co's properties had an exceedingly high death rate. On visiting the properties Yerra Yerra and Irrewarra, he found 60 Islanders ill with dysentery. Buttanshaw cited how local sugar planters benefitted financially by the death of an indentured worker.

The high mortality rate led to another medical investigation in 1880 when the Colonial Secretary, Arthur Hunter Palmer, ordered a departmental investigation into conditions in the Maryborough district. This was conducted by Drs Wray and Thomson who meticulously investigated the situation. They inspected Cran & Co's plantations and seven other estates in the area for comparative purposes. Their report blamed poor food, long working hours, polluted water, and a lack of proper care for the sick, for the high death rate.

The doctors advised of "an urgent necessity for a complete and efficient system of inspection" at all levels. Their recommendations included "the speedy erection of a Central Polynesian Hospital in each district, presided over by a qualified medical practitioner". Horrocks, who had suggested this system three years earlier, had also devised the means for its financing, through a fee paid annually by employers for each indentured South Sea Islander, with the wages of deceased servants likewise diverted into public funds.

The resultant new Act, the Pacific Island Labourers Act 1880 set limitations on the age of recruits; their living conditions; medical service and ration provisions; and the work they could undertake. Islanders could only be employed in tropical or sub-tropical agriculture, including the cultivation of sugar cane, cotton, tea, coffee, rice and spices. This Act made medical care for South Sea Islanders compulsory and made provision for the construction of central hospitals, sponsored by the government and financed by the planters and other masters. However, it took another three years for the first central hospitals, the Pacific Islander Hospitals at Mackay and Maryborough, to be constructed.

Organisations outside Queensland also complained about the high death rate for South Sea Islanders. In 1879 the Aborigines' Protection Society had contacted the Colonial Office directly about the excessive death rate for South Sea Islanders in Queensland. In 1883 The British Medical Journal cited the Queensland Registrar-General's annual report, which revealed that the death rate of South Sea Islanders was twelve times that of Europeans of the same age group, and requested investigation of the cause by the Secretary of State for the Colonies.

The period 1881 to 1884 marked the peak of the plantation system of growing sugar cane. In 1881, there were 6396 South Sea Islanders living in Queensland. Of these, 1515 (23.69%) lived in the Maryborough and Wide Bay census district, comprising 1163 adult males, 55 adult females, and 269 male and 28 female minors.

Two central hospitals for South Sea Islanders, called Pacific Islander Hospitals, were built in 1883. They were funded by the Queensland Government, planters and other masters (all of whom paid 10s per South Sea Islander employee per annum to the Pacific Islander Fund, as stipulated by the Pacific Islander Labours Act 1880). The first hospital opened was located at Mackay, the district with the largest South Sea Islander population. The second hospital was built at Tinana outside Maryborough. The Mackay Pacific Islander Hospital was reportedly "a good building, with large airy wards, on the same plan as, only larger than, the Maryborough hospital, and capable of carrying from 300 to 400 boys [sic]". Two more Pacific Islander Hospitals opened c. 1886, at Geraldton (now Innisfail) and Ingham Hospitals, both comprising separate "Kanaka ward" wings attached to the main hospital building, and with comparatively high bed densities.

The Pacific Islander Hospital for the Maryborough district was established at Tinana in late 1883. Specifications had been drawn up by the Department of Public Works in July 1882 and tenders for building the hospital and a resident surgeon's residence were called soon afterwards. The hospital buildings, chimneys and tanks were constructed during 1883 by contractor, Henry Neale, for £2762 10s. Its construction progressed slowly because of a shortage of timber. However, building was nearing completion in November 1883 when its first Resident Surgeon, Dr Charles H Clarkson, arrived to take charge of the facility. The hospital opened officially on 19 December 1883, although Clarkson had already admitted some cases.

The hospital was sited on a 13.18-hectare (32.6-acre) site at Tinana bounded by Iindah Road and two unnamed roads to its west and north. It was intended to provide care for 50 patients. The hospital complex, at the time of its construction, comprised a hospital building and a doctor's residence, built on the most elevated part of the site. The hospital building was specified as being built of ironbark or similar, supported by tarred ironbark or bloodwood timber stumps, and covered by a galvanised iron roof. The hospital building comprised two wards, a dispensary and a detached kitchen wing, connected by a covered way. The doctor's residence, along with its detached kitchen wing and covered way, was built of similar materials, and located about 56 feet (17 m) to the west of the hospital building. Concrete footings for the brick chimneys (hospital, residence and residence kitchen) and boiler mounts (2x 35-imperial-gallon (160 L; 42 US gal) boilers in hospital kitchen) were specified as being 15 inches (380 mm) deep, with an embedded sheet of 24-gauge galvanised iron to receive the brickwork above. Both the hospital and residence buildings had separate earth closets (locations unknown) and eight 800-imperial-gallon (3,600 L; 960 US gal) water tanks on timber stands.

Soon after taking up his position, Clarkson reported to the Colonial Secretary on the building and made recommendations for improvements to it and the grounds, and about furniture needed for the hospital's efficient functioning. Due to the necessity for isolation of violent or contagious cases, more rooms were needed than provided in the building's current configuration.

Clarkson recommended clearing the thick timber that surrounded the buildings, and constructing: a two-rail fence on the three lines of road that bounded the site; a picket or light galvanised iron fence to divide the house from the main hospital buildings; and trelliswork around portions of the verandah for privacy. He regarded the hospital's eight water storage tanks as inadequate to supply the probable number of patients. Furthermore, the tanks' overflow travelled under the hospital building, which was wasteful and detrimental to patients' health. He recommended that the hospital be connected to mains water from the Tinana waterworks on Teddington Road, about 1.5 miles (2.4 km) away, at a cost of about £180 per mile. This water supply would also enable firefighting. Clarkson also required; to be sited "at a distance from the building: a washing shed; a four-stalled stable and shed; and a "dead house" [morgue] with [a] Zinc and Iron-lined table". The Colonial Secretary or his delegate marked these additional building requests as approved on Clarkson's report. Temporary sheds for washing were under construction by assistant wardsmen in December 1883.

Clarkson also pointed out to the Colonial Secretary "the necessity for the reservation of a piece of land as [a] Cemetry [sic]. The Maryboro General Cemetry [sic] being six miles distant...". A year earlier, the Tinana Divisional Board had proposed a cemetery reserve adjacent to the Polynesian Hospital, but a suitable site could not be decided upon. As the Pacific Islander Hospital neared completion, the local Inspector of Polynesians (Thomas B Smyth) was arranging for "the provision of a cemetery to bury the remains of those who die" at the Pacific Islander Hospital. A reserve for "Polynesian Cemetery" R314 was created c. 1891 in the northeast corner of the site and appeared on later survey plans and maps. This implies that the reserved site was used for burials while the hospital was operating and a cemetery reserve was created after the hospital's closure to protect those burials.

In December 1883, Clarkson reported to the Colonial Secretary that he had appointed the staff for the hospital. These were: one married wardsman at £70 a year to commence his duties from 1 January 1884; two assistant wardsmen at 20s a week; and three South Sea Islander wardsmen, one at 12s per week and the others at 10s a week. The men were employed at the time in cutting firewood, making necessary alterations, filling up the closets, and building temporary sheds for washing and so forth. Clarkson also advised that he had engaged a carpenter at 40s per week to subdivide the ward and to make the necessary fittings - table and other furniture. On 2 February 1884 Clarkson advised that the subdivision of the wards was nearly completed, but the stable and dead house (morgue) and various internal fittings remained to be done. He had also added four additional tanks instead of the proposed underground tank, and reported that "necessary drainage will give a supply to a natural water course which exists about the middle of the paddock and the labour mostly of our wardsmen will as soon as the clearing is finished be able to turn it into a water hole available for the paddock and also for supplying water for washing purposes".

Illness was still very common among South Sea Islanders at this time. Clarkson's March 1884 report stated that due to the prevalence of dysentery and malarial fever there had been a large increase in the number of admissions, as well as a comparatively high death rate, with eight deaths that month. Clarkson was transferred to the Mackay Pacific Islander Hospital in April 1884 and replaced at Maryborough by Dr J Raphael Joseph.

Water supply continued to be a concern. By November 1884, the Committee of Management of the hospital resolved to request that the government have water connected from Tinana, noting the insufficient supply from only 12 tanks containing 800 imperial gallons (3,600 L; 960 US gal) each and that "the open waterhole that was made is unfit for use, even scrubbing purposes, the water going into it being contaminated with the worst kind of filth viz the washings from the Hospital itself". Tenders were invited for drainage work at the Polynesian Hospital, closing 2 January 1885, which was undertaken by A Brown for approximately £197. By 8 December, water pipes connecting the hospital to Tinana Waterworks were laid but the water pressure was very low.

Other improvements on the site were made soon afterwards. In January 1886 a carpenter was engaged in the erection of a stable, coach house, wash-house, bath and an ornamental paling fence around the doctor's residence. Stables were confirmed on the hospital site by April 1886.

Regulation of the hospital's procedures occurred in 1885. By-Laws for the hospital, established by the Colonial Secretary's Office, Brisbane, and in effect by 12 August 1885, specified requirements for a range of processes and activities including Committee of Management meetings and inspections, hospital visitation, reporting and burials. Forms were provided, to be completed for the notification of admissions, discharges and deaths. According to the hospital by-laws, patient burials were to be conducted by the hospital staff, with a permanent staff member required to sign the burial report. This change was reflected in the death register from August 1885 onwards.

In January 1886, all members of the Hospital Committee of Management resigned in protest against the Resident Surgeon's over-expenditure and unwillingness to reduce costs. The Committee was also concerned by the death rate at the hospital, reporting that the number of South Sea Islander deaths in the Maryborough district had risen, despite the hospital, from 77 in 1883; to 105 in 1884; to 122 in 1885.

In March 1886, Dr Joseph, the Resident Surgeon, faced a board of enquiry charged with five offences concerning the running of the hospital - primarily inappropriate use of hospital resources and staff. The charges included: using the night wardsman as a gardener in the doctor's private garden while an Islander performed the function of night wardsman; falsification of the patients' death rate to lessen the figure; often neglecting patients for up to a week, leaving a wardsman to do his work; and taking items from the hospital store for his private use.

The enquiry was inconclusive and no new legislation was enacted, but it did reveal that the doctor was abusing his position, although there was no evidence he falsified the death rate. Dr Joseph was dismissed by the Queensland Government in April 1886 and Dr David Watkins O'Connor, the local Health Officer, officiated at the hospital until the appointment of Dr Francis Bowe as the Resident Surgeon in May 1886.

Meanwhile the number of South Sea Islanders in the Maryborough district continued to reduce due to falling sugar prices and new legislation to limit inexpensive South Sea Islander labour and to break up large plantations into small holdings. An amendment to the Pacific Island Labourers Act 1880 banned South Sea Islanders from a range of work, and restricted them to menial jobs in agriculture and the Pacific Islanders Act 1885 sought to end the recruitment of South Sea Island labour by 1890. At 31 December 1886 there were 759 indentured employees (of a total of 10,165 in Queensland), down from 1215 adults in 1881. Through 136 arrivals, 53 deaths and 254 departures, it was estimated that the number of South Sea Islanders in the district would be 563 by 31 December 1887. By 1891 this number of South Sea Islanders working in the Maryborough district had reduced to 120, out of a total of 9478 in Queensland.

In 1887, Arthur Woodward, Inspector of Pacific Islanders and Officer-in-Charge of The Pacific Islander Labour Office, reported upon the Financial Condition of the Pacific Islanders' Hospitals, and recommended that all the Pacific Islander Hospitals be closed because the cost of running them would exhaust the Pacific Islanders' Fund, which paid for them, by 31 December 1887. Maryborough's deficit was estimated to be £6749 by the end of December 1887 and the other hospitals were also in debt. Woodward reported that while The Pacific Islanders Fund, was in credit for £2871 3s 11d, the four Pacific Islander Hospitals (Maryborough, Mackay, Ingham, and Johnstone) were in deficit of £19,079 16s 5d, estimated to increase to over £21,263 by 31 Dec 1887.

No action was taken until Woodward's report for the following year repeated his advice. The Maryborough and Mackay Pacific Islander Hospitals closed on 31 December 1888. Subsequently, the "Kanaka Ward" at Geraldton (Innisfail) Hospital and the "Kanaka Ward" at Ingham Hospital, which had opened c. 1886, closed in December 1890. Of these four Pacific Islander Hospitals, only the Maryborough one had an adjacent "Polynesian Cemetery" reserve and has not been totally developed in 2017; with the Mackay, Geraldton and Ingham sites operating as modern hospital complexes.

After the closure of the central Pacific Islander Hospitals, South Sea Islanders were cared for in separate wards established at general hospitals, or were cared for at their plantations. Maryborough sugar planters had met in January 1889 to decide how to care for their sick South Sea Islander workers and resolved to approach the Maryborough General Hospital and to petition the government to have portions of the Polynesian Hospital building, and its furniture, shifted to the Maryborough Hospital, as a separate ward, because the Maryborough people did not wish to have "the coolies mixed with the whites" at the hospital. Subsequently, in 1889, part of the Pacific Islander Hospital building at Tinana was removed and established at the Maryborough General Hospital as a "Polynesians" ward'.

Meanwhile, a large quantity of furniture and stores from the Pacific Islander Hospital, Maryborough was sold by auction at the Immigration Depot.

A survey plan of the site from 1891 shows the hospital building and adjacent doctor's residence located in the northwest corner of Lot 5 of Section 130 and orientated parallel to the northern lot boundary (later Bluebell Road). A waterhole is located to the southwest of the residence, which was surrounded by a square, fenced garden area, and was accessed via a made road that had a gated entrance on Iindah Road to the south. The Polynesian Cemetery Reserve, R.314, is identified as a 1 acre (0.40 ha) 28-perch (710 m^{2}) area to the northeast of Lot 4 of Section 130.

In March 1892, the remaining buildings were inspected for disposal, and a more detailed plan of the extant, and recently removed, structures was prepared. The hospital building comprised a long central ward, with north and south-facing verandahs and double-sided chimneys at either end; flanked by wings to the east (ward with partitions at northern end) and west (partitioned to form several rooms), each with verandahs that had enclosures (possibly lavatories) at the northern end. The detached hospital kitchen, which was connected to the northern verandah of the central ward by a covered way, had a south-facing verandah and contained three rooms, the largest central room with a chimney flanked by boilers. The residence comprised a square core of four rooms, the sitting room containing a chimney, with verandahs to the east, south and west (enclosed bathroom at northern end); and had a detached two-room kitchen to the north that contained a chimney and was connected by a covered way.

The disposal report noted that a portion of the hospital building (west wing), down-piping and guttering, all 12 tanks and stands, the roof of the covered way, and kitchen and ward partitions, had been removed. The residence was recommended for reuse as a police station at Tinana, and was subsequently rebuilt at Gympie Road for that purpose. The cladding used for the verandah enclosures matches that of the detached kitchen. Material from the hospital building was used for the associated police cell built on the Tinana Police Station site.

A total of 363 patients died at the Pacific Islander Hospital, Maryborough between 1883 and 1888. Prior to the establishment of Pacific Islander Hospitals, South Sea Islanders were buried on the plantations on which they worked or in the "non-Christian" or "coloured section" of general cemeteries. In January 1876, Richard Bingham Sheridan, the Inspector of Polynesians for the Maryborough district, said in his report to the office of the Colonial Secretary: "...I am led to believe that the interment of a South Sea Islander in no way differs from the burial of a dog or any other carrion. As I am informed, a hole or grave is made in the most convenient place, the body, as soon as possible after it has ceased to breathe, is rolled in the blanket in which it died, and put in the shallow resting place without further care or ceremony." While the Maryborough Cemetery does contain a small section in which South Sea Islanders were reportedly buried, there are no known records of South Sea Islander burials at the Maryborough Cemetery between 1883 and 1888. Given the distance of 6 miles (9.7 km) to Maryborough Cemetery from the Pacific Islander Hospital, it is likely that some, if not all, of the deceased patients were buried in the adjacent Polynesian Cemetery Reserve.

The Pacific Islanders Act 1885, which aimed to end recruitment, was repealed in 1892 on economic grounds. However the Pacific Island Labourers (Extension) Act 1892 further barred South Sea Islanders from construction work on plantation roads and tramways. Nevertheless, the plantation system was gradually supplanted by the central mill system serving small cane farms worked by European labour.

After Federation in 1901, two pieces of Australian Government legislation put an end to the South Sea Islander labour trade: the Immigration Restriction Act 1901 and the Pacific Island Labourers Act 1901. The former initiated the various policies that came to be termed the "White Australia Policy" by excluding all non-European immigrants. The latter legislation ended recruitment of South Sea Islanders from March 1904 and started their deportation after December 1906. Up to 1908, around 7000 people were deported. About 1200 were granted residency, and an estimated 1000 others stayed on in Australia without residency approval.

On 30 March 1911, Lots 4 and 5 of Section 130, the land comprising the former Pacific Islander Hospital, Maryborough (excluding the Reserve for Polynesian Cemetery), were sold to William Nichols, who was subsequently issued a Deed of Grant in September 1914. The land changed ownership a number of times thereafter. In 1972 the Reserve for Polynesian Cemetery was redesignated as Portion 134 and subsequently sold at public auction to the owners of Lots 4 and 5 in late 1972 or early 1973. In 1994, the former cemetery site and adjacent allotment to its west were reconfigured to increase the size of the former Portion 134 to 1.148 hectares (2.84 acres).

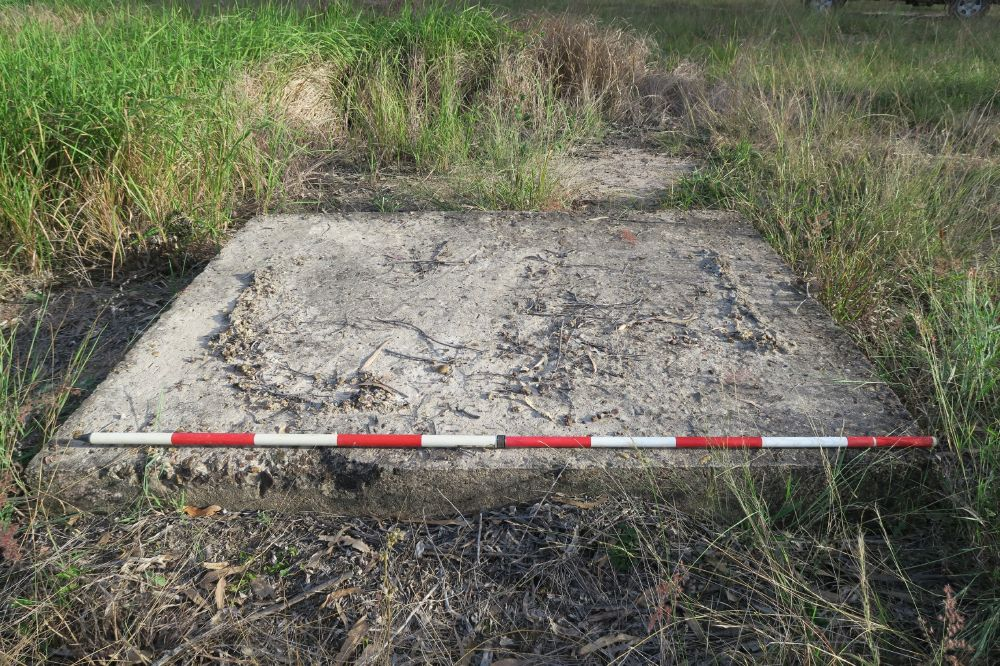
Chimney base (SW concrete slab) of former Pacific Islander Hospital building, from north, 2017

Over time, modification of the former hospital and cemetery site has occurred, in association with various occupation and land use practices. A residence, flanked by paddocks or enclosures to the west and south, was established to the south of the former hospital buildings by 1940. The made road from the former hospital to Iindah Road was still evident, though the central portion of the alignment deviated to the west of that indicated in the 1891 survey plan. Mature vegetation in the vicinity of the residence and to the north and east of the made road had been substantially cleared. By 1957 the residence was no longer extant, and the lot containing the former cemetery reserve, and an area in the southwest corner of the site, had been substantially cleared of vegetation, the latter reportedly used as a gravel quarry. Further clearing of vegetation across the northern centre of the site was evident by 1964, along with the addition of a dam to the immediate south of the former cemetery reserve. A house was constructed on the northern side of the former cemetery reserve by 1994, and further structures, vegetation clearance and landscaping has occurred across the northern extent of the site in recent years, including a dam excavated in the vicinity of the historical waterhole.

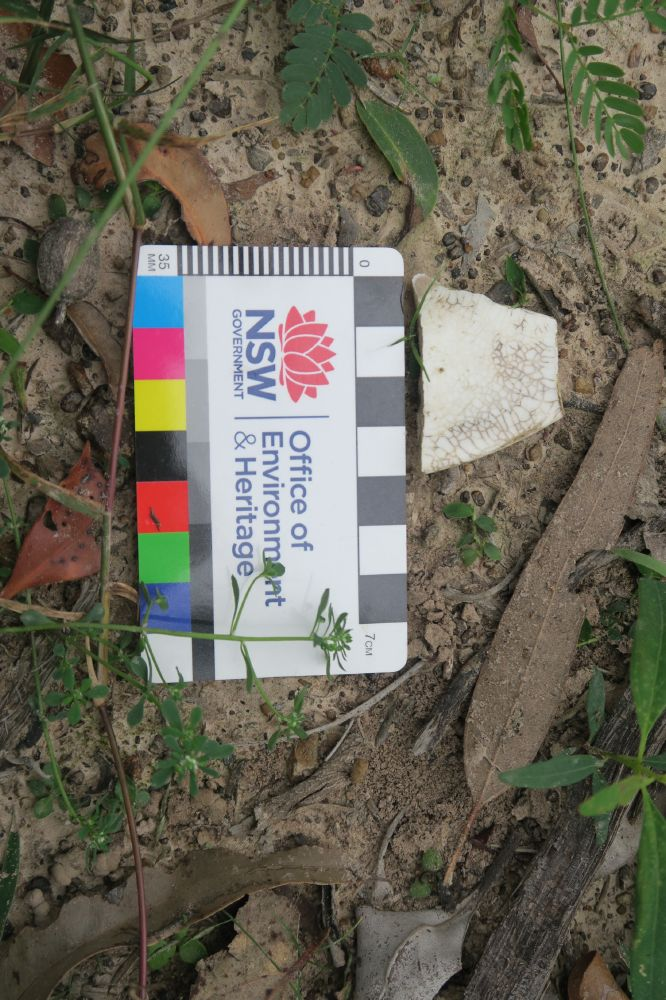
Ceramic found on site of hospital residence and garden, 2017

In 2017 the former Pacific Islander Hospital and Cemetery site comprises three allotments - Lot 1 RP880020 (east, cemetery reserve); Lot 2 RP880020 (centre); and Lot 5 M371033 (west, hospital and residence site).

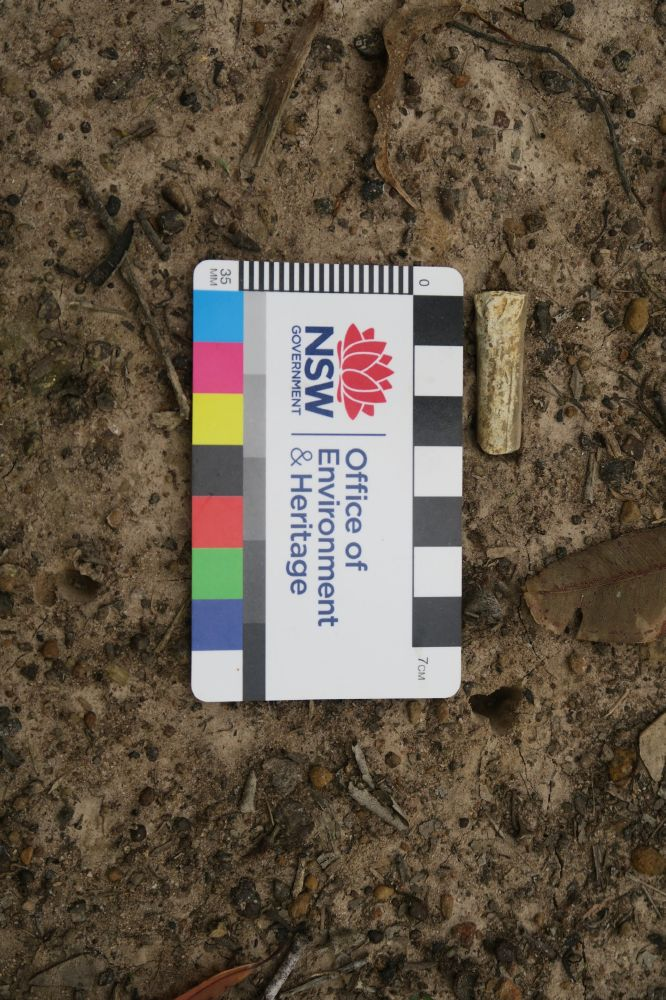
Clay pipe end found on site of the residence garden, 2017

=== Archaeological surface survey ===
An archaeological surface survey of the former Pacific Island Hospital site (Lot 5 M371033 and Lot 2 RP880020 only) was undertaken in May 2017. The site was found to be heavily disturbed but some structural and artefactual traces of the former complex were identified. These were concentrated in the northwest corner of Lot 5 and included three concrete slabs that correspond with the configuration of chimney bases for the hospital building and detached kitchen, as indicated in the 1892 plan, as well as small isolated fragments and scatters of ceramic, glass, butchered bone, brick and clay pipe. The type and range of ceramics were limited but generally consistent with domestic activities, including possible high-status vitrified ceramics in the vicinity of the doctor's residence, although some of the heavy earthenware could relate to medical purposes. Two lithic artefacts and freshwater mussel shells (Velesunio ambiguus) in the vicinity of the dam (former waterhole) could potentially predate the hospital era or relate to South Sea Islander peoples adapting traditional technologies and food sources on site. Several timber posts, generally consistent with the description of the timber rail fence erected around the hospital reserve, were observed. No historical artefacts or features were located on Lot 2, other than a timber post on the southern boundary. Overall the fragmentary and decontextualised nature of surface finds, which were difficult to accurately date, general absence of substantial building debris and apparent lack of rubbish pits, broken bottles or dense artefacts scatters that are normally found at late 19th and early 20th century occupation sites, has resulted in low (Lot 2) to moderate (Lot 5) archaeological potential.

A surface survey of Lot 1 RP880020 was not undertaken due to access restrictions. Historical records indicate that this former cemetery site has high archaeological potential. Archaeological investigations at and around the site, including the use of non-invasive methods such as ground-penetrating radar, have the potential to clarify the presence, nature and extent of burials, which along with the identification and analysis of associated artefacts and features could address broader research questions that relate to: the treatment of deceased patients and burial practices at the hospital; mortality rates, gender and age; spatial distribution and arrangement of graves - whether patients were buried individually or communally; evidence of traditional South Sea Islander cultures in burial practices; comparative studies with plantation burials; and broader late 19th century social attitudes towards South Sea Islander indentured workers.

=== Commemoration ===
The Kanaka Memorial in the Mary River Parklands, Maryborough, recognises the hard work and the sacrifices of the South Sea Islander workers to the success of Maryborough.

The hospital and cemetery site was nominated for entry in the Queensland Heritage Register in 2017 due to its importance to the South Sea Islander community and to highlight South Sea Islander history and association with the site.

== Description ==
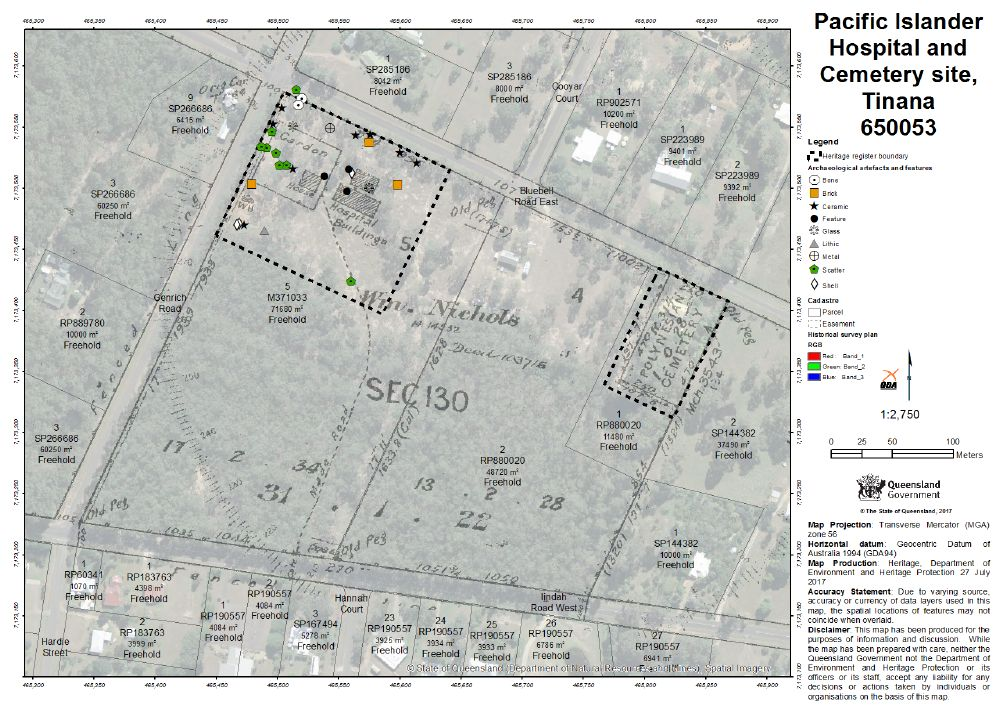
Site map, 2017

The Pacific Islander Hospital and Cemetery site is located in the suburb of Tinana, across the Mary River from and approximately 5.5 kilometres (3.4 mi) southwest of the Maryborough CBD. The 19th century hospital site and cemetery reserve occupied Lot 5 M371033, Lot 1 RP880020 and Lot 1 RP880020, which slope down from the northwest to southeast and are bounded by Iindah Road (south), Genrich Road (west) and Bluebell Road East (north). However, the register boundary comprises two separate areas including part of Lot 1 RP880020 (cemetery, east) and part of Lot 5 M371033 (hospital site, west).

=== Hospital site ===
The registered former hospital site occupies 1.95 hectares (4.8 acres) in the northwest corner of Lot 5 M371033. Mature vegetation has been substantially cleared from the heavily disturbed site, with the exception of some scattered and perimeter eucalypts, and grass cover comprises thick, waist high weed species such as Blady or Kunai grass (Imperata cylindrical) and Snake Weed (Stachytarpheta spp.).

Visible evidence of the 19th century occupation includes three rectangular concrete chimney bases, positioned in a triangular formation and orientated roughly parallel to Bluebell Road, and isolated artefacts and scatters.

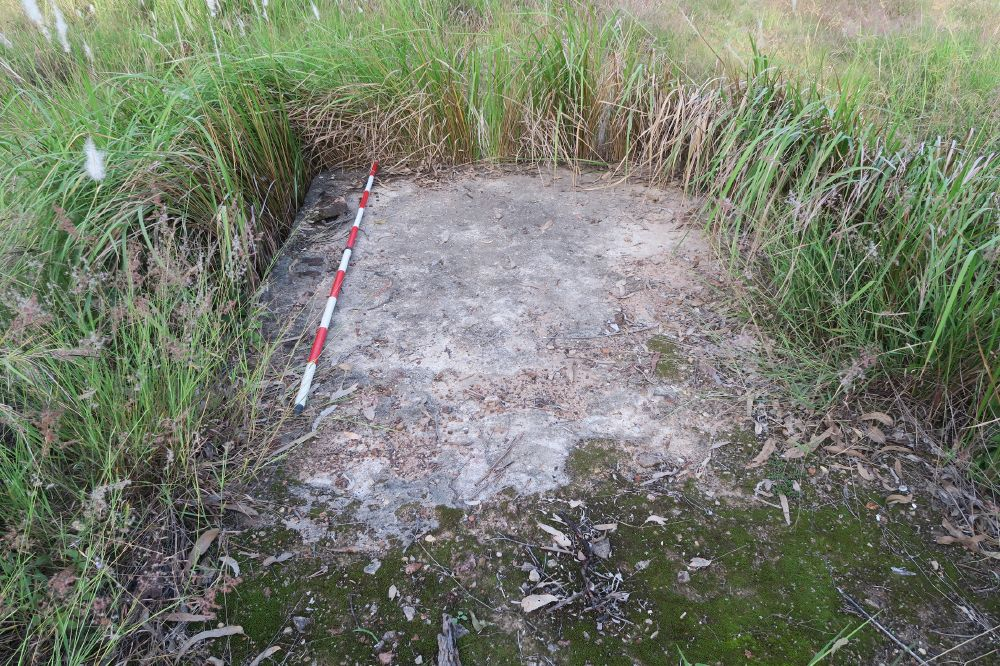
- Kitchen chimney and boiler base (N concrete slab) of former Pacific Islander Hospital building, from west, 2017
  The northern chimney base (detached kitchen) is the largest of the three and comprises a 4.37 metres (14.3 ft) (east-west) x 1.96 metres (6 ft 5 in) (north-south) concrete slab, with surface concentrations of mortar and scattered bricks on top and around. Outlines visible on the centre of the slab indicate the location of the former fireplace / boiler structure or partitions.
- The south-eastern chimney base (hospital building) comprises a 2.16 metres (7 ft 1 in) (east-west) x 1.72 metres (5 ft 8 in) (north-south) concrete slab, with surface traces of mortar and brick. Freshly broken pieces of concrete from the southwest corner of the slab indicate the possible use of heavy machinery in clearing the site.
- The south-western chimney base (hospital building) comprises a 2.18 metres (7 ft 2 in) (east-west) x 1.73 metres (5 ft 8 in) (north-south) concrete slab, with surface traces of remnant mortar.

Artefacts distributed across the hospital site are generally highly fragmented, comprising scatters and small isolated pieces of ceramic (predominately domestic, with traces of possible medical earthenware), glass, butchered bone, brick and clay pipe. Artefacts in the vicinity of the dam (former waterhole), to the southwest of the chimney slabs, include stone tools and freshwater mussel shells (Velesunio ambiguous).

=== Cemetery ===
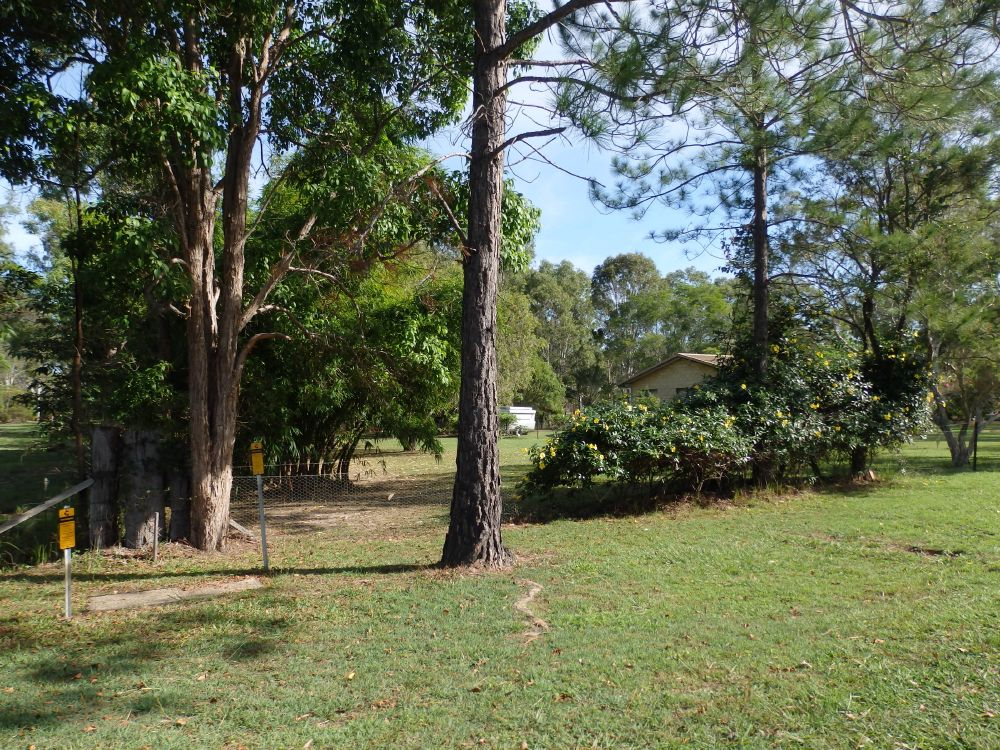
Former cemetery reserve site (now private home) as seen from Bluebell Road, 2017

The historical cemetery reserve comprises 0.476 hectares (1.18 acres) in the northeast corner of Lot 1 RP880020, and the register boundary covers the northern 0.78 hectares (1.9 acres) of the lot, which includes a 17-metre (56 ft) buffer to the west and south to account for the potential for burials and other subsurface features to exist outside the reserve.

The lot has been developed as a private residence, with a house, sheds, lawn areas and landscaped gardens to the north, bamboo along the western boundary, and a modern dam surrounded by various eucalypts to the south.

== Heritage listing ==
Pacific Islander Hospital and Cemetery site was listed on the Queensland Heritage Register on 27 October 2017 having satisfied the following criteria.

The place is important in demonstrating the evolution or pattern of Queensland's history.

The Pacific Islander Hospital and Cemetery site (1883–88), located at Tinana, is important in demonstrating the response by the Queensland Government during the 1880s to the high death rate among indentured South Sea Islanders employed in Queensland's important sugar industry. As the site of one of only four "central hospitals" built exclusively for the treatment of South Sea Islanders; and one of the two not attached to a general hospital, it is a rare and important remnant of this government initiative.

The place has potential to yield information that will contribute to an understanding of Queensland's history.

As a rare example of a "Polynesian Cemetery" reserve attached to a 19th-century Pacific Islander Hospital, the place has the potential to yield new information that will contribute to a greater understanding of the role and treatment of South Sea Islanders in Queensland's history.

Archaeological investigations at and around the former cemetery reserve could clarify the presence, nature and extent of burials, which along with the identification and analysis of associated artefacts and features could address broader research questions include: the treatment of deceased patients and burial practices at the hospital; spatial distribution and arrangement of graves; evidence of traditional South Sea Islander cultures in burial practices; comparative studies with plantation burial practices; and broader late 19th century social attitudes towards South Sea Islander indentured workers.

The place has a strong or special association with a particular community or cultural group for social, cultural or spiritual reasons.

The Pacific Islander Hospital and Cemetery site has a special association with Queensland's South Sea Islander community, who are descendants of those who came to Queensland as indentured labourers between 1863 and 1904. Now an archaeological site, it represents the loss of South Sea Islanders to illness and injury as a result of their labour to establish and develop the Queensland sugar industry.

The place has a special association with the life or work of a particular person, group or organisation of importance in Queensland's history.

The Pacific Islander Hospital and Cemetery site has a special association with the South Sea Islanders who, as indentured workers, made an important contribution to the establishment and development of the Queensland sugar industry. Over approximately 35 years, thousands of South Sea Islanders worked in the Maryborough district, and 1964 were admitted to the Pacific Islander Hospital at Tinana; where 363 died.
