= Bidwill, Queensland =

Suburb of Queensland, Australia

Bidwill
- Suburb
- Interactive map of Bidwill
- Coordinates: 25.5858°S 152.7194°E
- Country: Australia
- State: Queensland
- LGA: Fraser Coast Region
- Location: 9.2 km (5.7 mi) S of Maryborough; 40.2 km (25.0 mi) S of Hervey Bay; 273 km (170 mi) N of Brisbane

Government
  - State electorate: Maryborough
  - Federal division: Wide Bay

Area
  - Total: 33.5 km^{2} (12.9 sq mi)

Population
  - Total: 517 (2021 census)
  - Density: 15.43/km^{2} (39.97/sq mi)
- Time zone: UTC+10:00 (AEST)
- Postcode: 4650
Suburbs around Bidwill
Tinana	Maryborough; Granville	Boonooroo Plains
Tinana South	Bidwill	Tuan Forest
Teddington	Magnolia	Tuan Forest

Bidwill is a locality in the Fraser Coast Region, Queensland, Australia. In the 2021 census, Bidwill had a population of 517 people.

== Geography ==
The Mary River forms the short north-western boundary, while Jumpo Creek forms the western boundary on its way to join the Mary.

== History ==
The locality takes its name from the parish and creek, which in turn were named after botanist John Carne Bidwill, who was Commissioner for Crown Lands in the Wide Bay area in 1848 to 1853 and lived in the area.

Bidwell Provisional School opened in 1896. On 1 January 1909, it became Bidwell State School. It closed in 1936. Note the spelling of district name was later changed to be Bidwill. The school was at 741 Bidwill Road (25.61676°S 152.71243°E).

== Demographics ==
In the 2016 census, Bidwill had a population of 491 people.

In the 2021 census, Bidwill had a population of 517 people.

== Education ==
There are no schools in Bidwill. The nearest government primary schools are Granville State School in neighbouring Granville to the north and Parke State School in neighbouring Tinana South to the west. The nearest government secondary school is Maryborough State High School in neighbouring Maryborough to the north.
