= Tinana, Queensland =

Tinana
- Town
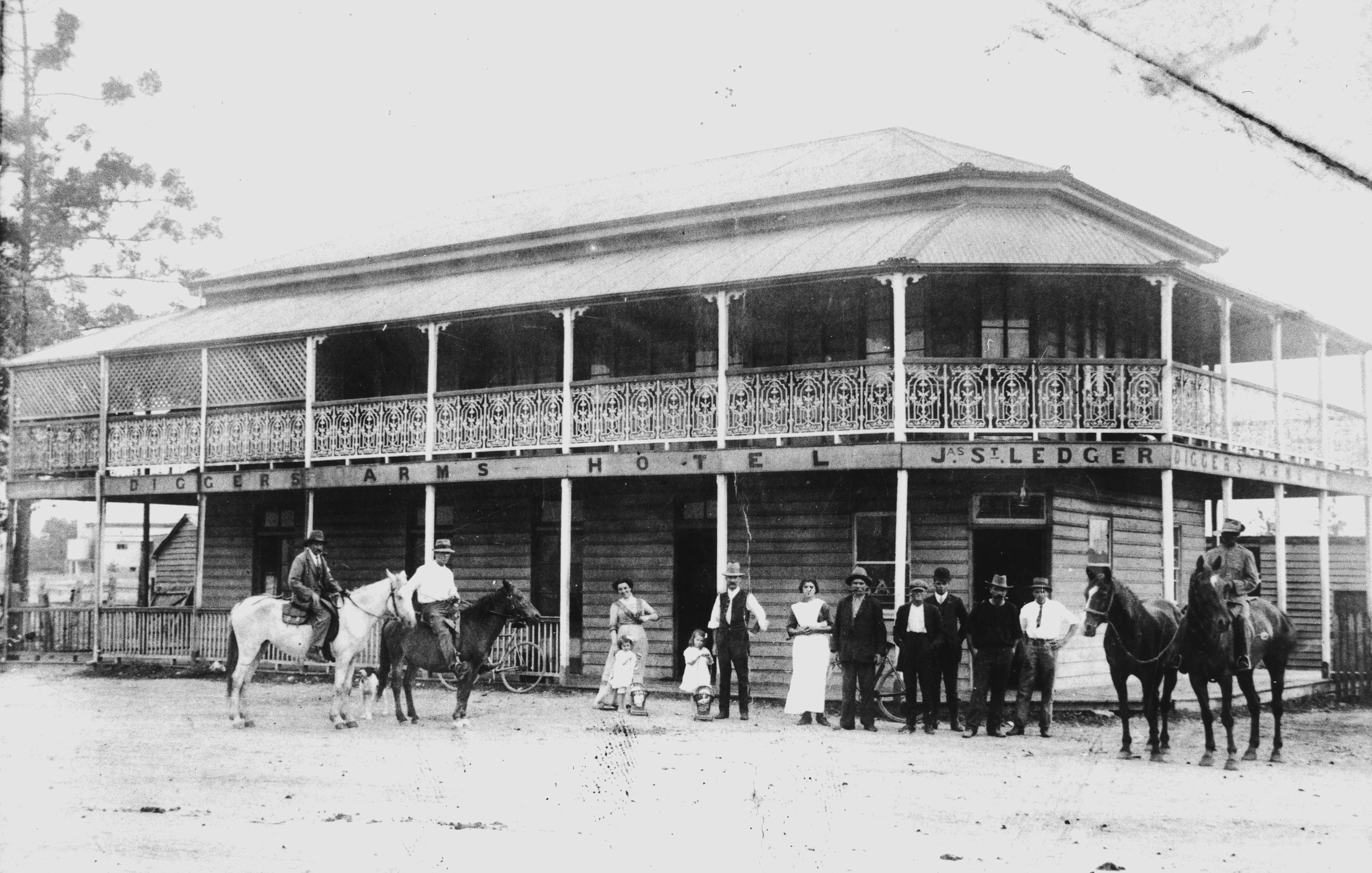
- Diggers Arms Hotel

- Interactive map of Tinana
- Coordinates: 25.55°S 152.6783°E
- Country: Australia
- State: Queensland
- LGA: Fraser Coast Region
- Location: 3.7 km (2.3 mi) SW of Maryborough; 33.8 km (21.0 mi) SSW of Hervey Bay; 83.8 km (52.1 mi) N of Gympie; 262 km (163 mi) N of Brisbane

Government
  - State electorate: Maryborough
  - Federal division: Wide Bay

Area
  - Total: 37.3 km^{2} (14.4 sq mi)
- Elevation: 10–30 m (33–98 ft)

Population
  - Total: 5,872 (2021 census)
  - Density: 157.43/km^{2} (407.7/sq mi)
- Time zone: UTC+10:00 (AEST)
- Postcode: 4650
Localities around Tinana
Oakhurst	Maryborough West	Maryborough
Yengarie	Tinana	Maryborough
Grahams Creek	Tinana South	Bidwill

Tinana is a rural town and locality in the Fraser Coast Region, Queensland, Australia. In the 2021 census, the locality of Tinana had a population of 5,872 people.

== Geography ==
Tinana is bounded to the west, north and east by the Mary River, while Tinana Creek forms the south-east boundary.

The Bruce Highway enters the locality from the south (Tinana South), bypasses the town of Tinana to the west, and then exits the locality to the north (Maryborough West / Maryborough) crossing the Mary River on the Henry Palmer Bridge. Gympie Road (State Route 57) diverges from the Bruce Highway, passing through the town of Tinana, and exits the locality to the north-east across the Lamington Bridge to the Maryborough CBD.

Although originally a separate town, the construction of the Lamington Bridge over the Mary River has effectively made Tinana a suburb of Maryborough.

The land use is predominantly residential with the remainder used for growing sugarcane and grazing on native vegetation.

== History ==
The name Tinana is derived from the name of the creek, which in turn was named in 1852 by surveyor William Labatt. The name is believed to be in honour of Ihikiera Te Tinana, a Māori chief who was known to the botanist John Carne Bidwill from his time in New Zealand in 1840–41.

Tinana Creek Provisional School opened in 1871, closed in 1873, reopened in 1874 and closed permanently in 1878.

Tinana State School opened on 31 May 1875.

Holy Trinity Anglican church opened circa 1883. It closed circa 1918.

The Tinana War Memorial was officially unveiled on 23 November 1918.

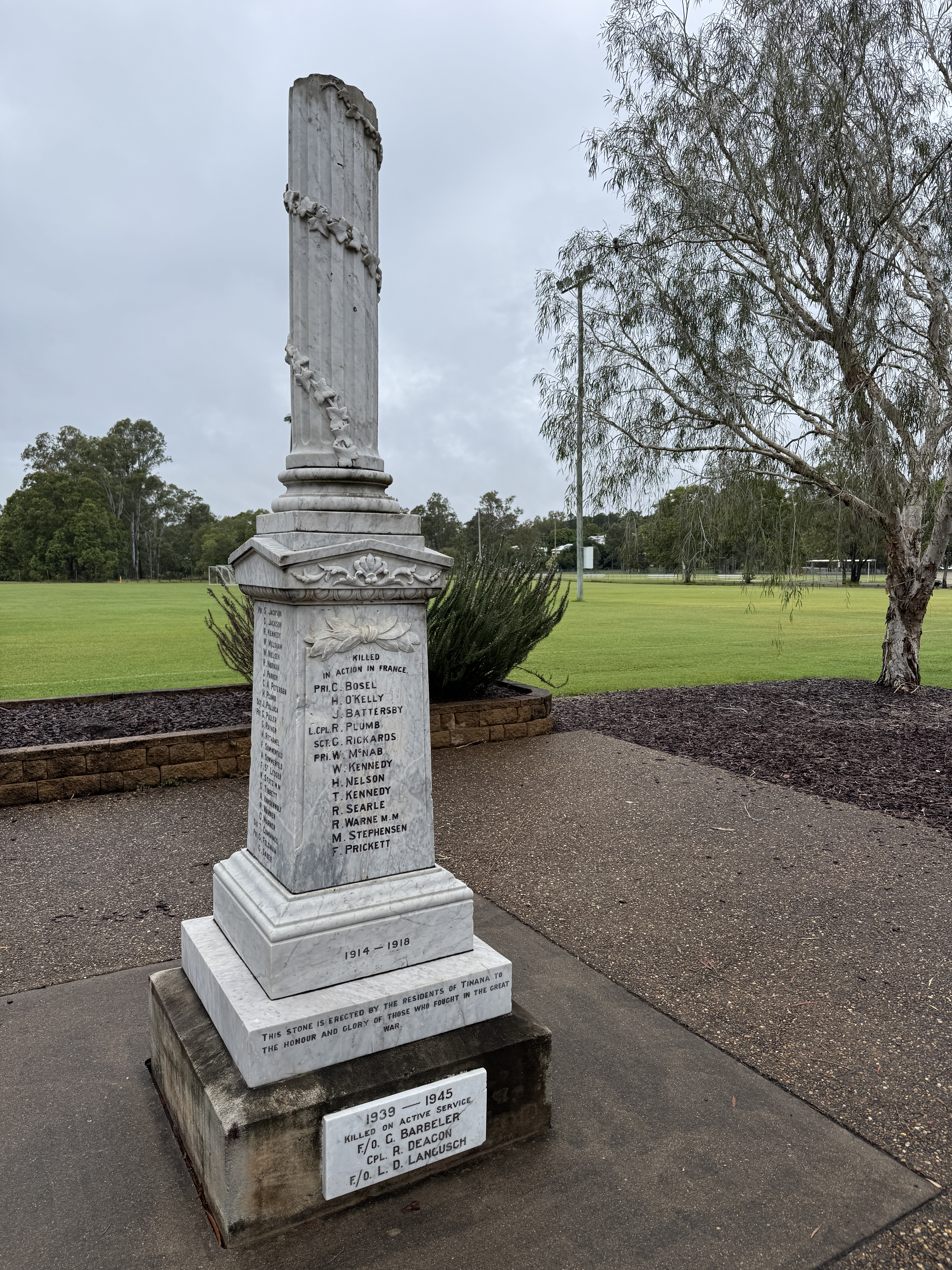
The Tinana War Memorial was unveiled in November 1918.

Tinana Congregational Church opened on Sunday 30 August 1908. In January 1932, the Congregational Home Missionary Society asked the Fort Street Baptist Church in Maryborough to assume responsibility for the Sunday evening services at Tinana, leading to the Baptist Church taking over the control and supervision of the Congregation Church. In 1937 the Baptist Church formally purchased the church. It was on a 1-acre (0.40 ha) site on the southern corner of Teddington Road and Gympie Road (25.5528°S 152.6760°E). It is no longer extant.

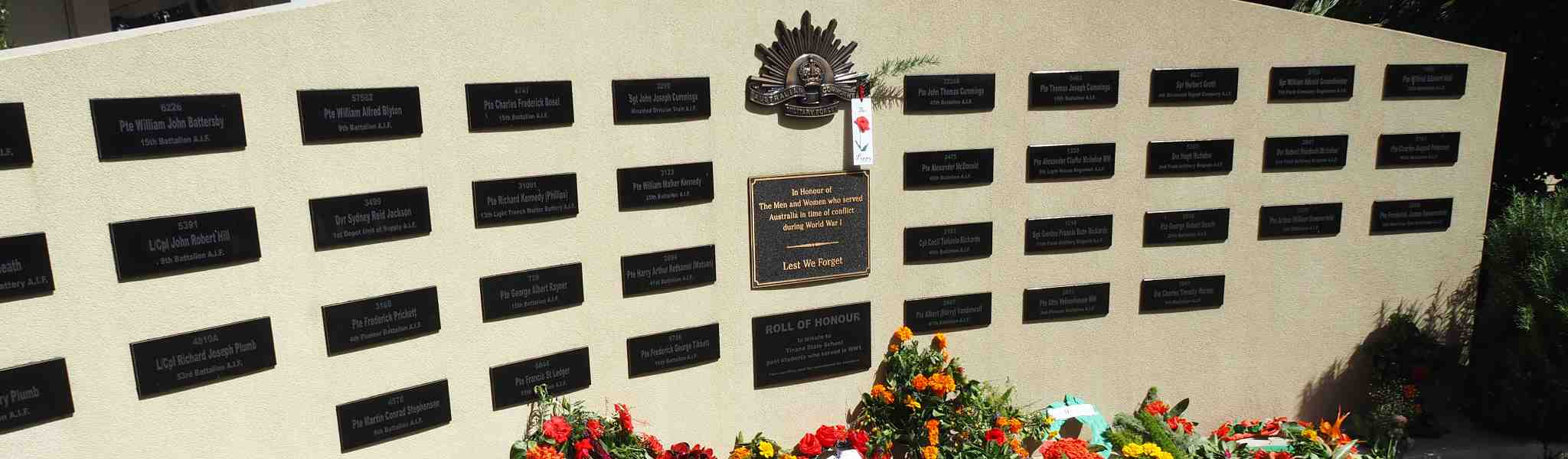
War memorial, Tinana State School, 2019

On 25 April (Anzac Day) 2015, as part of the World War I centenary, a war memorial was officially unveiled at the school. It commemorates former students who served in World War I.

== Demographics ==
In the 2011 census, the locality of Tinana had a population of 4,877 people.

In the 2016 census, the locality of Tinana had a population of 5,476 people.

In the 2021 census, the locality of Tinana had a population of 5,872 people.

== Heritage listings ==
Tinana has a number of heritage-listed sites, including:

- Pacific Islander Hospital and Cemetery site: corner of Bluebell Road East and Gernich Road (25.5556°S 152.6570°E)
- Commissioner Bidwill's Grave: Cran Road (25.5631°S 152.7111°E)
- Lamington Bridge over the Mary River

== Education ==
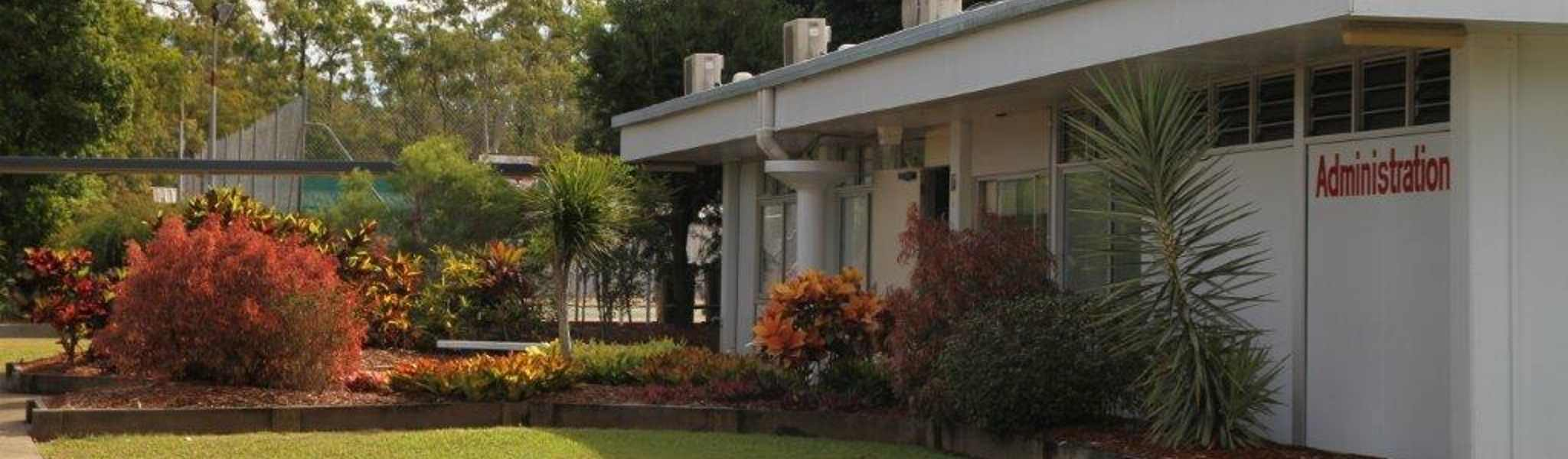
Tinana State School

Tinana State School is a government primary (Prep–6) school for boys and girls at 239 Gympie Road (25.5586°S 152.6675°E). It includes a special education program. In 2015, it had an enrolment of 509 students with 38 teachers (33 full-time equivalent). In 2018, the school had an enrolment of 498 students with 41 teachers (34 full-time equivalent) and 28 non-teaching staff (19 full-time equivalent).

There are no secondary schools in Tinana. The nearest government secondary school is Maryborough State High School in neighbouring Maryborough to the north-east.

== Amenities ==
The Tinana branch of the Queensland Country Women's Association met at the CWA hall at 56 Gympie Road before closing, the building is now used as the Second Life Women's Hub. (25.5467°S 152.6817°E).

There are a number of parks in the locality, including:

- Fauna Reserve (25.5660°S 152.6778°E)
- Jack Mason Park (25.5550°S 152.6739°E)
- Leslie Drive Park (25.5459°S 152.6794°E)
- O'Connor Road Park (25.5474°S 152.6725°E)
- Pioneer Country Park (25.5489°S 152.6880°E)
- Schultz Park (25.5489°S 152.6814°E)
- Woocoo Park (25.5622°S 152.6758°E)

== Sport ==
Maryborough Speedway, off Gympie Road, races sedans and includes a motorcycle speedway track within the site (25°33′48″S 152°40′02″E). The track hosted the Queensland Solo Championship in 2016.

The Tinana Disc Golf Course is at Schultz Park, Tinana.

== Notable residents ==
Notable residents of Tinana include:

- John Carne Bidwill, botanist
- Emily Bulcock, poet
