= Tinana South, Queensland =

Tinana South
- Suburb
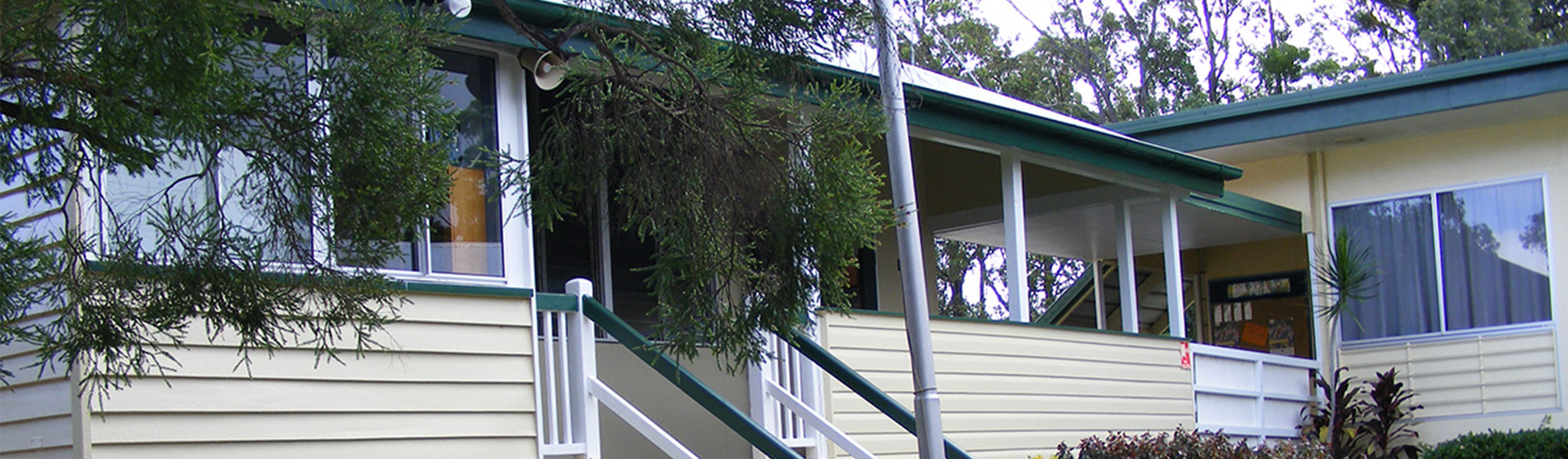
- Parke State School, 2023

- Interactive map of Tinana South
- Coordinates: 25.5872°S 152.6697°E
- Country: Australia
- State: Queensland
- LGA: Fraser Coast Region
- Location: 8.0 km (5.0 mi) SSW of Maryborough; 38.1 km (23.7 mi) SSW of Hervey Bay; 81.2 km (50.5 mi) N of Gympie; 259 km (161 mi) N of Brisbane

Government
  - State electorate: Maryborough
  - Federal division: Wide Bay

Area
  - Total: 25.7 km^{2} (9.9 sq mi)

Population
  - Total: 545 (2021 census)
  - Density: 21.21/km^{2} (54.92/sq mi)
- Time zone: UTC+10:00 (AEST)
- Postcode: 4650
Suburbs around Tinana South
Grahams Creek	Tinana	Tinana
Grahams Creek	Tinana South	Bidwill
Mungar; Ferney	Glenorchy; Teddington	Bidwill

Tinana South is a rural locality in the Fraser Coast Region, Queensland, Australia. In the 2021 census, Tinana South had a population of 545 people.

== Geography ==
The Mary River forms the western boundary of the locality, while Tinana Creek forms the eastern boundary.

The Bruce Highway passes through the locality from the south (Glenorchy) to the north (Tinana).

The principal land use is irrigated crop growing, predominantly sugarcane. There is also grazing on native vegetation.

== History ==
In March 1913, local residents requested the Queensland Government provide a school for the local area, pointing out that children were having to walk three or four miles to the school in Tinana. Local sugarcane farmer John Parke donated 5 acres (2.0 ha) of his property "Spring Grove" for the Teddington State School (as it was originally proposed to be named). It was built as an open-air school (a less-enclosed building). The school was officially opened as Parke State School on 24 October 1914 by John Douglas Story, the Under-Secretary for the Department of Education. Story praised the open-air design as being both healthier for the students and cheaper for the government, as small rural schools were not always permanent due to fluctuations in the local population. The school admitted its first 21 students on 11 November 1914; the first teacher was Grace Smith. On 24 November 1914, it was officially confirmed that the school would be known Parke State School in honour of Parke who was killed in a farm accident in November 1913 (although this name was already in unofficial use at time of its opening).

== Demographics ==
In the 2016 census, Tinana South had a population of 505 people.

In the 2021 census, Tinana South had a population of 545 people.

== Education ==
Parke State School is a government primary (Prep-6) school for boys and girls at 400 Teddington Road (25.5882°S 152.6689°E). In 2017, the school had an enrolment of 58 students with 4 teachers and 5 non-teaching staff (3 full-time equivalent).

There are no secondary schools in Tinana South; the nearest government secondary school is Maryborough State High School in Maryborough to the north.
