= Maryborough Government Offices Building =

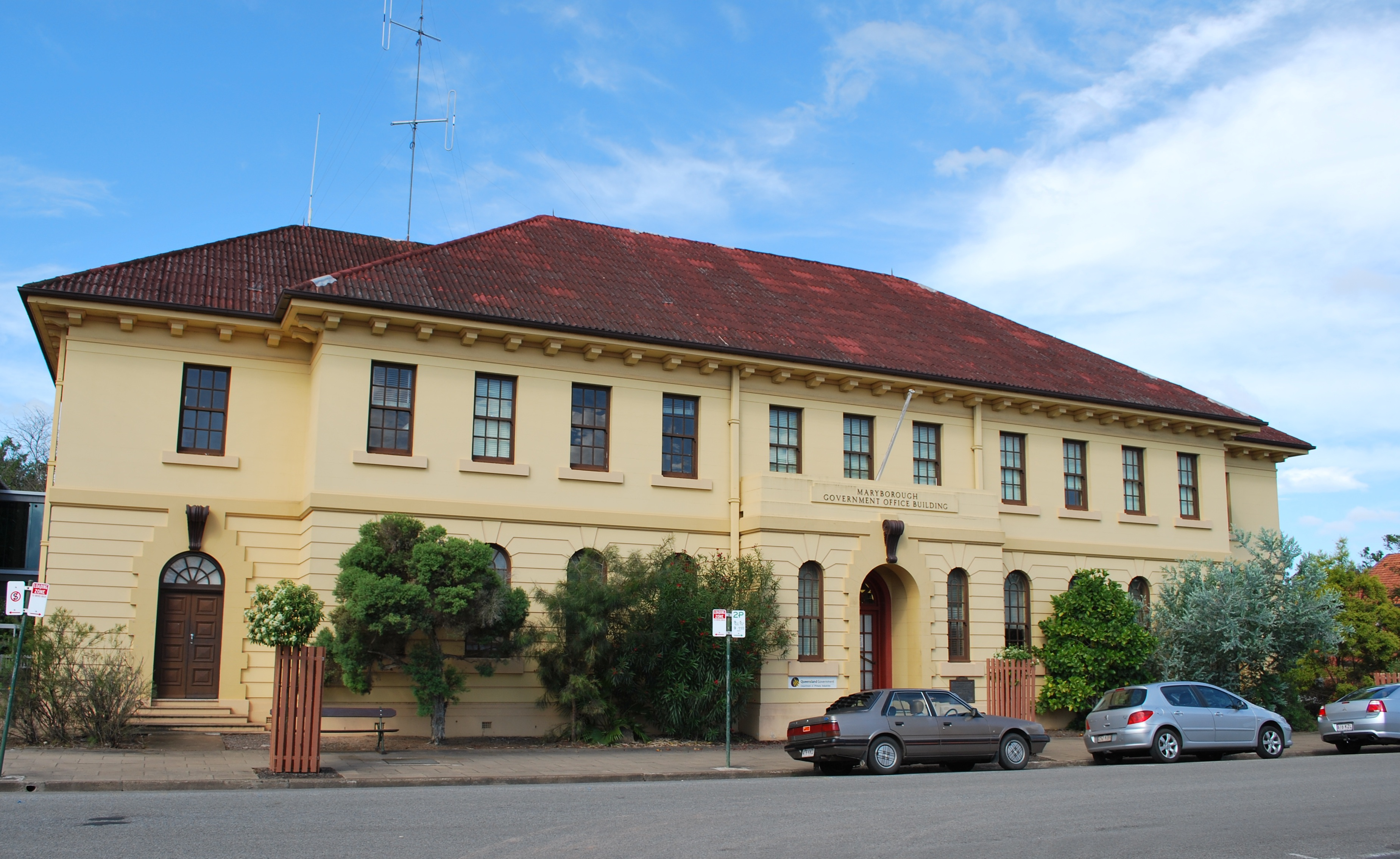
- Maryborough Government Offices Building, 2008

- Location within Queensland Location within Australia
- 25.5379°S 152.705°E
- Location: 123 Wharf Street, Maryborough, Fraser Coast Region, Queensland, Australia

History
- Design period: 1919–1930s (interwar period)
- Built: 1940–1940

Site notes
- Architect(s): Gilbert Robert Beveridge, Raymond Clare Nowland
- Architectural style: Georgian

Queensland Heritage Register
- Official name: Maryborough Government Office Building, State Government Insurance Offices, State Government Offices
- Type: state heritage (built)
- Designated: 21 October 1992
- Reference no.: 600713
- Significant period: 1930s–1940s (fabric)
- Significant components: strong room
- Builders: Relief work

Maryborough Government Offices Building is a heritage-listed office building at 123 Wharf Street, Maryborough, Fraser Coast Region, Queensland, Australia. It was designed by Gilbert Robert Beveridge and Raymond Clare Nowland and built in 1940 by relief work. It is also known as State Government Insurance Offices and State Government Offices. It was added to the Queensland Heritage Register on 21 October 1992.

Following major restoration works, it was reopened and renamed the Moira Hansen Maryborough Government Offices in 2018.

== History ==
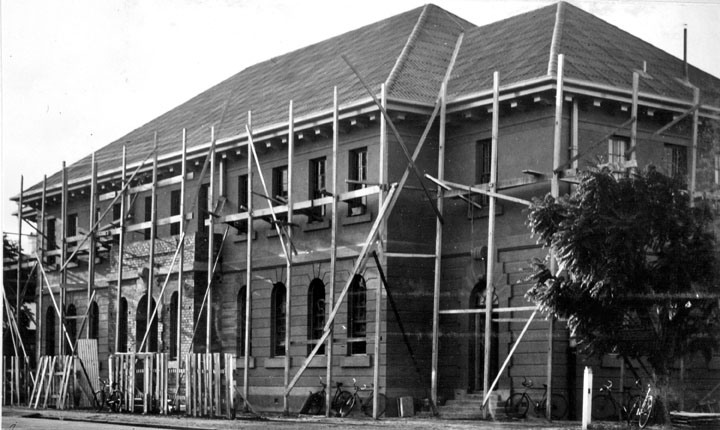
Maryborough Government Office Building under construction, June 1940

The Maryborough State Government Offices were designed in 1939 by Public Works Department architects GR Beveridge and RC Nowland to supplement the already existing state government office space provided for in the ground floor of the Maryborough Court House. The building was constructed on the Maryborough Courthouse reserve in 1940, replacing an early garden between the Court House and Wharf Street.

The Maryborough State Government building is located in a precinct of substantial 19th and early 20th century public and commercial buildings around Wharf Street. It was designed to complement the adjacent Court House as well as the nearby Post Office and Customs House. The precinct around Wharf Street encompasses the core of Maryborough's historical public and commercial buildings which sprang from the development of the city's wharves in the area in 1852.

The original township of Maryborough was situated, not in its current place, but on the north of the Mary River, after wharves were established in 1847–8, to provide transport for wool from sheep stations on the Burnett River. In 1852 the growing town was gradually transferred further north where ships were better able to navigate the river. Development followed and by March 1861, Maryborough was declared a municipality (the Borough of Maryborough) and Henry Palmer was appointed as the first Mayor.

During the late 1860s and 1870s Maryborough developed rapidly as the port of the nearby gold rushes in the Gympie area. The first circuit court hearings were held in local hotels from the late 1850s. In about 1856 a permanent court house and lockup for Maryborough were designed by Alexander Dawson, Colonial Architect of New South Wales. By 1857 the New South Wales Government voted that the sum of £1000 be spent on the erection of a courthouse and lockup, but it seems this was not completed until the early 1860s (after the Separation of Queensland). These brick buildings, supposedly the first brick structures in Maryborough, were built on the corner of Kent and Adelaide Streets, on the site of the present City Hall. Repairs and additions were made to these buildings in 1871 but, soon after, plans were being prepared for a new courthouse on another site.

FDG Stanley, the Colonial Architect of Queensland was responsible for the design of the new building which was completed by September 1875 when Stanley write a memo about his proposal:

the design has been arranged so as to place offices of the Department of Roads, Public Lands and Survey on the ground floor as being more readily accessible from the street, and the courts and offices associated therewith on the upper floor as being removed from noise and as being in a better position as regards ventilation. The material to be employed is brick on stone foundations faced in cement when not covered by verandahs; the roof to be slated and the internal finishings of a plain substantial character.

Stanley remained in the positions of Colonial Architect for effectively ten years, from 1871 until 1881, during which time and with the help of his staff he produced many fine public buildings throughout Queensland, including several Maryborough buildings. The tender for the erection of the Maryborough Court House was won by John Thomas Annear with the sum of £7345 and work on the building was completed by 20 September 1877. The former court house was retained at its original site and became used as a quarters for police and was demolished to make way for the construction of the new Town Hall in 1908.

The Maryborough Court House was a large two storeyed building, designed to house the offices of several government departments on the ground floor and the court room and ancillary facilities above. The building was sited overlooking Queen's Park and addressing both Wharf and Richmond Streets. Between Wharf Street and the courthouse a garden was established which enhanced the building's garden setting.

The ground floor of the courthouse provided offices for government departments. However, more floor space was needed and therefore the decision was made to erect a new Government Offices Building, in line with government policy for encouraging capital works in the 1930s to overcome the effect of the Great Depression. The Government Offices Building was designed by the Department of Public Works and two staff members seem to have been involved on the project. Two drawings of the proposed building were prepared. The first set was drawn by GR Beveridge and included elevations, ceiling and roof plans and general layouts of the site and the other, by RC Nowland is a detailed floor plan.

The Government Offices Building impacted on the courthouse as the courthouse gardens were sacrificed to provide the space for the new building. However, as the construction of the new offices solved problems of space in the courthouse, the courthouse was remodelled internally at the same time.

The Maryborough Government Offices Building continues to house Queensland Government Departments and displays much of its original design and fittings.

== Description ==
The Maryborough Government Office Building is a substantial rendered brick building prominently located on the corner of Wharf and Richmond Streets, alongside the Court House. The building is designed to complement the proportions and massing of the Court House.

The building has a rectangular plan with a corrugated fibrous cement hipped roof over the body of the building, with hipped sections over the two bays at either end of the building. The corrugated fibrous- cement roof tiles simulate the appearance of terracotta tiles. The overhanging eaves of the roof are supported on moulded corbels which provide a decorative line around the cornice of the building.

The symmetrically composed Wharf Street facade of the Government Offices is divided into three bays, comprising the central portion and side wings. The ground floor of the building displays rendered stone coursing and is lined with a number of round arched window openings. Centrally projecting from the ground floor Wharf Street facade is a one storeyed entrance vestibule. This continues the ground floor stone coursing and has a centrally located round arched entrance which is surrounded by relief rendered quoining and an arched fanlight above. The central doorway is surmounted by a rectangular keystone which displays in relief the name "Maryborough Government Office Building". The upper floor of the building is lined with rectangular window openings glazed with six panelled vertical sash windows.

The side wings at either end of the building principally house the internal stairs and are distinguished externally by a central arched doorway to the street. The wings are stepped-back from the front facade of the building and flank the central core in symmetry.

The interior of the building comprises two levels which display much of the original fittings and joinery. The entrance to the lower floor leads into a large reception area which features a decorative terrazzo floor and large solid timber service counter. From this public space, the open-plan central office space can be seen and is accessed by a passage to the side of the counter. The central office area features decorative plaster coffered ceilings.

Located in the north-east corner of the ground floor is a records room adjoining a strong room which were part of the original plans. The strong room still displays its iron door, however both rooms are used for storage. In the south-east corner of the ground floor is a private office, originally the manager's office, which has original parquetry floors and timber panelled walls. This plan is replicated at the south-west corner of the ground floor, however this room does not display the same quality finishes. The north-west corner of the ground floor contains a separate room which was originally used at the typists' room.

Extending outward from the central open office space are two passageways which lead to stairways located in the side wings. The staircases and lower ground landings are intact and display terrazo flooring and steps with decorative rectangular cast-iron balustrade panels of a modern design consisting of three upright bars, the central bar being a barley-twist. The handrails and upright posts are of timber. The ground floor landings also give access to Wharf Street via a double set of doors, the inner doors being French doors with six-panelled glass panes and the outer door of solid timber with surmounting fanlight. These landings also display original timber directory boards with glass panes.

The upper floor consists of numerous offices which flank either side of a narrow hall which runs the length of the central core of the building. This floor is characterised by its high-quality timber features namely office doors and joinery and externally studded ceilings in a grid pattern. Toilets are located at either end of the upper floor, in the side wings.

The rear of the building, the northern face, fronts onto a landscaped pedestrian walkway which runs between the government offices and the courthouse. The walkway contains a recently completed mosaic ground mural in commemoration of the centenary of Federation.

== Heritage listing ==
Maryborough Government Offices Building was listed on the Queensland Heritage Register on 21 October 1992 having satisfied the following criteria.

The place is important in demonstrating the evolution or pattern of Queensland's history.

Constructed in 1940, the Maryborough Government Offices Building is important in demonstrating the continued role of the city of Maryborough as a regional administration centre which developed from its significant position as a major Port of Entry since the 1850s. The building is also an example of construction work carried out under the unemployment relief scheme instigated by the State Government during the depression of the 1930s.

The place is important in demonstrating the principal characteristics of a particular class of cultural places.

The Maryborough Government Offices Building is a good representative example of the Inter-War Georgian Revival style and is typical of the high standard of public buildings designed by the Queensland State Government Architects in this style prior to the Second World War. Other examples of this type of building include the Innisfail and Mackay Court Houses and the Government Offices in Cairns and Townsville. The intact interior design features such as the strong room, the individual offices and the high quality of finishes also demonstrate the workings of state government administration at the time of construction.

The place is important because of its aesthetic significance.

The building is an important component of the Wharf Street precinct which comprises predominantly substantial commercial and public buildings from the 19th and early 20th centuries which developed near the busy trading centre of the Mary River wharves and now present a coherent character throughout the area. The building complements other buildings in the Wharf Street precinct, particularly the adjacent Court House to which it is harmonious in scale and form, making a significant contribution to the townscape. The form, scale and fabric of the building illustrate a skilled design approach, and the detailing of the materials and finishes exhibit fine quality craftsmanship.

The place has a special association with the life or work of a particular person, group or organisation of importance in Queensland's history.

The Maryborough Government Offices Building has special association with the work of the Queensland Works Department as a good example of their inter-war work throughout the State.
