= Maryborough Courthouse =

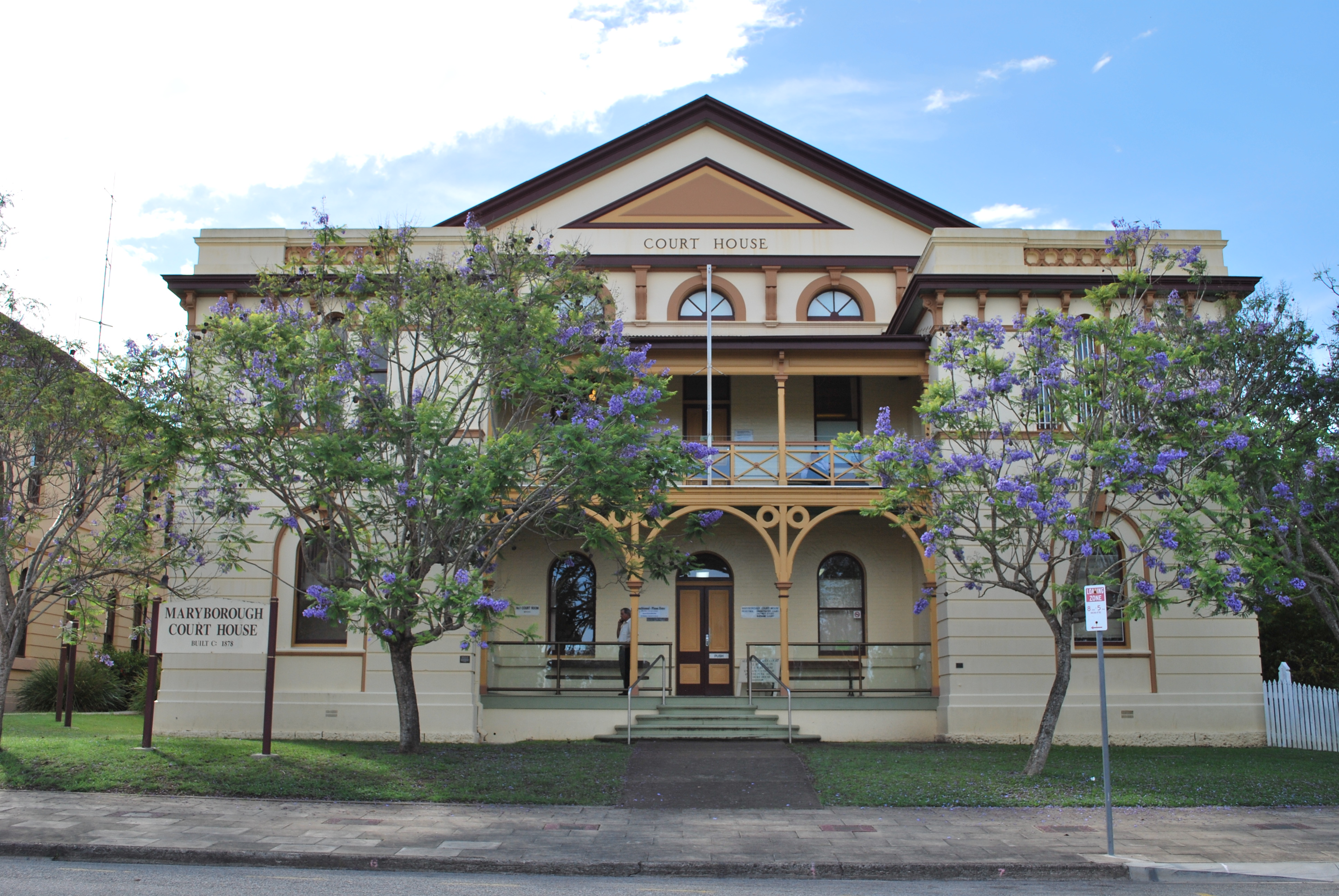
- Maryborough Courthouse, 2008

- Location within Queensland
- 25.5379°S 152.705°E
- Location: 170 Richmond Street, Maryborough, Fraser Coast Region, Queensland, Australia

History
- Design period: 1870s–1890s (late 19th century)
- Built: 1877
- Built for: Queensland Government

Site notes
- Architect: Francis Drummond Greville Stanley
- Architectural style: Classicism

Queensland Heritage Register
- Official name: Maryborough Court House, Maryborough Court House and Government Offices
- Type: state heritage (built)
- Designated: 21 October 1992
- Reference no.: 600714
- Significant period: 1870s (historical); 1870s–1940s (fabric)
- Significant components: court house, office/s
- Builders: John Thomas Annear

Maryborough Courthouse is a heritage-listed courthouse at 170 Richmond Street, Maryborough, Fraser Coast Region, Queensland, Australia. It was designed by Francis Drummond Greville Stanley and built in 1877 by John Thomas Annear for the Queensland Government. It is also known as Maryborough Court House and Government Offices. It was added to the Queensland Heritage Register on 21 October 1992.

The complex was the first large court building designed for a rural town in Queensland. It was the forerunner for several other buildings in regional areas. The building is rectangular in form with corner towers and connecting verandahs, and was constructed in rendered brick, with timber work forming the verandahs. The building stands as part of the historic Wharf Street precinct in central Maryborough. The courthouse has been in continuous use by the supreme, district and magistrates courts of Queensland since it was completed in 1878, making it the longest serving and oldest courthouse in use in Queensland.

== History ==
The Maryborough Courthouse was constructed in 1877 to the design of the then Queensland Colonial Architect, FDG Stanley for use as both a courthouse and as offices for Queensland Government departments. The building is the second Maryborough Courthouse replacing an earlier 1860s building constructed on another site.

The original township of Maryborough was situated, not in its current place, but on the north of the Mary River, after wharves were established in 1847–1848, to provide transport for wool from sheep stations on the Burnett River. In 1852 the growing town was gradually transferred further south where ships were better able to navigate the river. Development followed and by March 1861, Maryborough was declared a municipality (the Borough of Maryborough) and Henry Palmer was appointed as the first Mayor.

During the late 1860s and 1870s Maryborough developed rapidly as the port of the nearby Gympie goldfields. The first circuit court hearings were held in local hotels from the late 1850s. In about 1856 a permanent courthouse and lockup for Maryborough were designed by Alexander Dawson, Colonial Architect of New South Wales. By 1857 the New South Wales Government voted that the sum of £1000 be spent on the erection of a courthouse and lockup, but it seems this was not completed until after the Separation of Queensland in the early 1860s and seems to be unattributable to Alexander Dawson. These brick buildings, supposedly the first brick structures in Maryborough, were built on the corner of Kent and Adelaide Streets, on the site of the present City Hall, which had been reserved for courthouse use in early Maryborough surveys. Repairs and additions were made to these buildings in 1871 but, soon after, plans were being prepared for a new courthouse. This was to be constructed on another site several blocks to the east of the first site, which had become available in 1874 following the relocation of the emigration barracks and the consequent extension of the adjacent Queen's Park.

FDG Stanley, the Colonial Architect of Queensland was responsible for the design of the new building. Stanley arrived in Queensland in 1861 from Scotland where he trained. He was appointed to the Office of the Colonial Architect in 1863 as a clerk of works and in 1872 succeeded Charles Tiffin as the Colonial Architect. Prior to being asked to design the Maryborough Courthouse, Stanley was already experienced in the design of large public buildings, although this was early in his prolific career in Queensland.

The courthouse was constructed for approximately £7345 after Stanley's initial estimation of around £5500.

Stanley conceived the Maryborough Courthouse as a double-storeyed arcaded pavilion with towers at each corner, sited between Queens Park and the adjacent street. The footprint of the building was set well back from Wharf Street providing space for a garden forecourt with Jacaranda trees enhancing the principal entrance. Stanley write a memo about his proposal for the Courthouse in September 1875:

the design has been arranged so as to place offices of the Department of Roads, Public Lands and Survey on the ground floor as being more readily accessible from the street, and the courts and offices associated therewith on the upper floor as being removed from noise and as being in a better position as regards ventilation. The material to be employed is brick on stone foundations faced in cement when not covered by verandahs; the roof to be slated and the internal finishings of a plain substantial character.

The necessity of segregating the top and bottom floors caused Stanley to provide two separate stair halls at each end of the pavilion within the two corner towers nearest the park, at the rear of the building, to which access was provided from the north eastern verandah. The northern stair gave access for judges and barristers and the eastern stair was provided for prisoners escorted by police and the public.

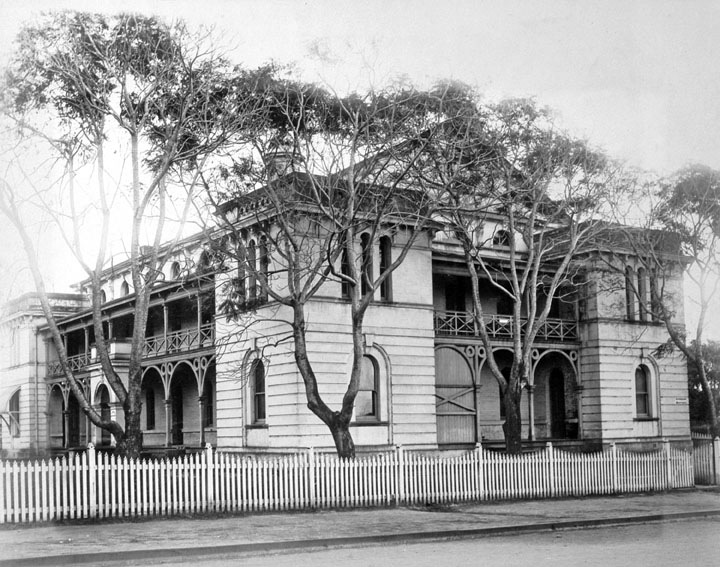
Courthouse, circa 1890

The Maryborough Courthouse was constructed for about £7,345 after Stanley's initial estimation of about £5,500. Tenders were called on 20 October 1875 and on 19 November 1876 the lowest tender of local contractor, John Thomas Annear was accepted who undertook to complete the building within twelve months. The building was occupied, at least partially, by August 1877.

Stanley remained in the position of Colonial Architect for effectively ten years, from 1871 until 1881, during which time and with the help of his staff he produced many fine public buildings throughout Queensland, including several Maryborough buildings. The former courthouse was retained at its original site and became used as a quarters for police and was demolished to make way for the construction of the new Town Hall in 1908.

Many alterations have occurred since construction within the Courthouse precinct affecting both the setting and the building fabric. Firstly, stables were added by 1878. Very soon after construction another stair was built in the part of the south-east verandah and for dedicated public use, where previously they were sharing the prisoner's stair. During the late nineteenth century and early twentieth century window shades were added, repair and repainting work was done and additional closets were built.

The ground floor of the courthouse provided offices for Queensland Government departments. However, more floor space was needed for the government departments and therefore a decision was made to erect a new building. This was in line with government policy for encouraging capital works in the 1930s to overcome the effect of the Great Depression. The Government Offices Building was designed by the Department of Public Works and two staff members seem to have been involved on the project. Two drawings of the proposed building were prepared. The first set was drawn by Gilbert Robert Beveridge and included elevations, ceiling and roof plans and general layouts of the site and the other, by Raymond Clare Nowland is a detailed floor plan. The addition of the Government Offices Building in 1939 between Wharf Street and the courthouse replaced the established garden and dramatically altered the context of the courthouse. The Government Offices Building is separately heritage-listed.

Because the construction of the new offices solved problems of space in the courthouse, the courthouse was remodelled internally at the same time. This remodelling occurred in 1942 at a cost of £4,851 and involved limiting access to Richmond Street, removing internal partitions on the ground floor level and removing six fireplaces. Also new stairs were constructed in three of the four corners of the building and a stables was demolished to make way for an air raid shelter.

== Description ==
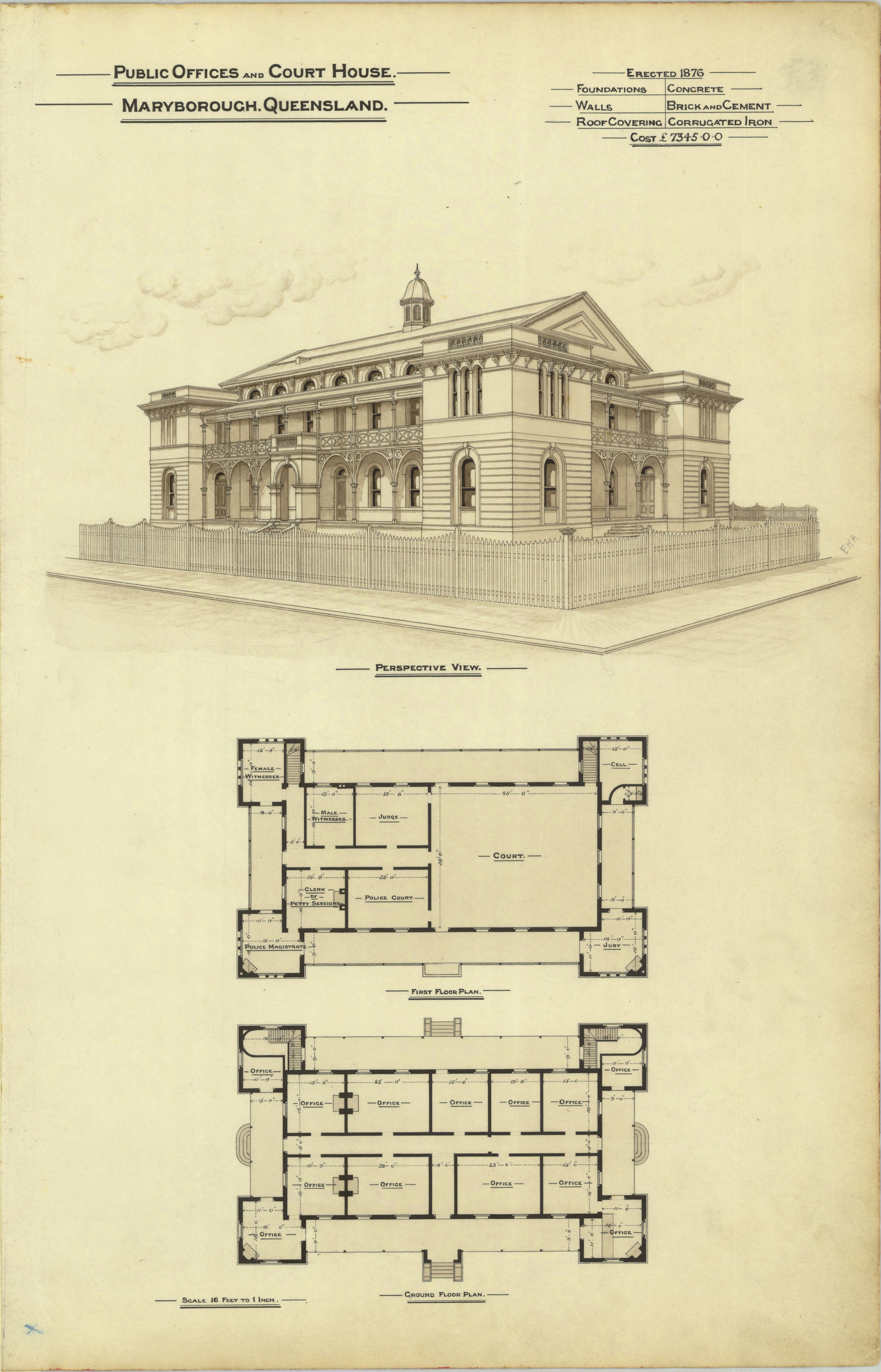
Architectural plans, circa 1888

The Maryborough Courthouse is a two storeyed rendered brick building, situated on the edge of Queen's Park, facing Richmond Street and the principal facade of Customs House across Richmond Street.

The building has a rectangular-shaped floor plan and a corrugated iron gabled roof. Lining the facades of the building are double-storeyed verandahs, or loggias, which are recessed between rusticated corner pavilion towers. The verandahs are semi-enclosed on the ground floor by a light timber framed arcade supported on timber columns. Circular timber motifs appear in the open spandrels of the arches. The upper level of the verandah comprises a number of regularly spaced timber posts with cross-braced timber balustrading. The timber posts support a skillion awning which has a wide facia board where decorative timber brackets are aligned with the posts below. Above the verandah on the two short sides of the building are three semi-circular openings above which is the gabled end of the roof. Centrally located on the edge of the verandah of the ground floor of the long elevations of the building, facing the park and the Government Offices, are masonry pavilion entrances with round arched entrances.

The square planned corner pavilion towers between which the verandahs are placed, are rusticated at ground floor level with a round arched opening on each face, and smooth rendered on the first floor with a group of three round arched openings. Above these openings is a substantial cornice supported on closely spaced timber brackets. Above this moulding is a simple corniced parapet concealing the roofs of the pavilions. The parapet has a central moulded panel of interlocking circles.

The building was designed to accommodate offices on the ground floor and a courtroom and associated office space on the upper floor. The ground floor is presently essentially open plan with offices at the rear of the floor. The ground floor has a plaster ceiling with darkly stained timber grid framing. Regularly throughout the open section of the floor are substantial square planed stop-chamfered rendered masonry columns. The rear offices are formed with plaster rendered walls and feature similar coffered ceiling framing.

The upper floor is accessed via a concrete stair in the southern tower, dating from the early 1940s. An open balcony on the first floor acts as an entrance vestibule to the courtroom which is entered via a double timber door. The courtroom is a large open plan room fitted with nineteenth century furniture. The original ceiling has been concealed with a suspended grid ceiling, housing lighting and other services. The room is naturally lit with a number of large windows and French lights opening onto the adjacent verandahs. Above these openings are high level semi-circular windows which sit on a string course lining the room. The walls are painted and bagged brickwork with a plaster skirting board.

== Heritage listing ==
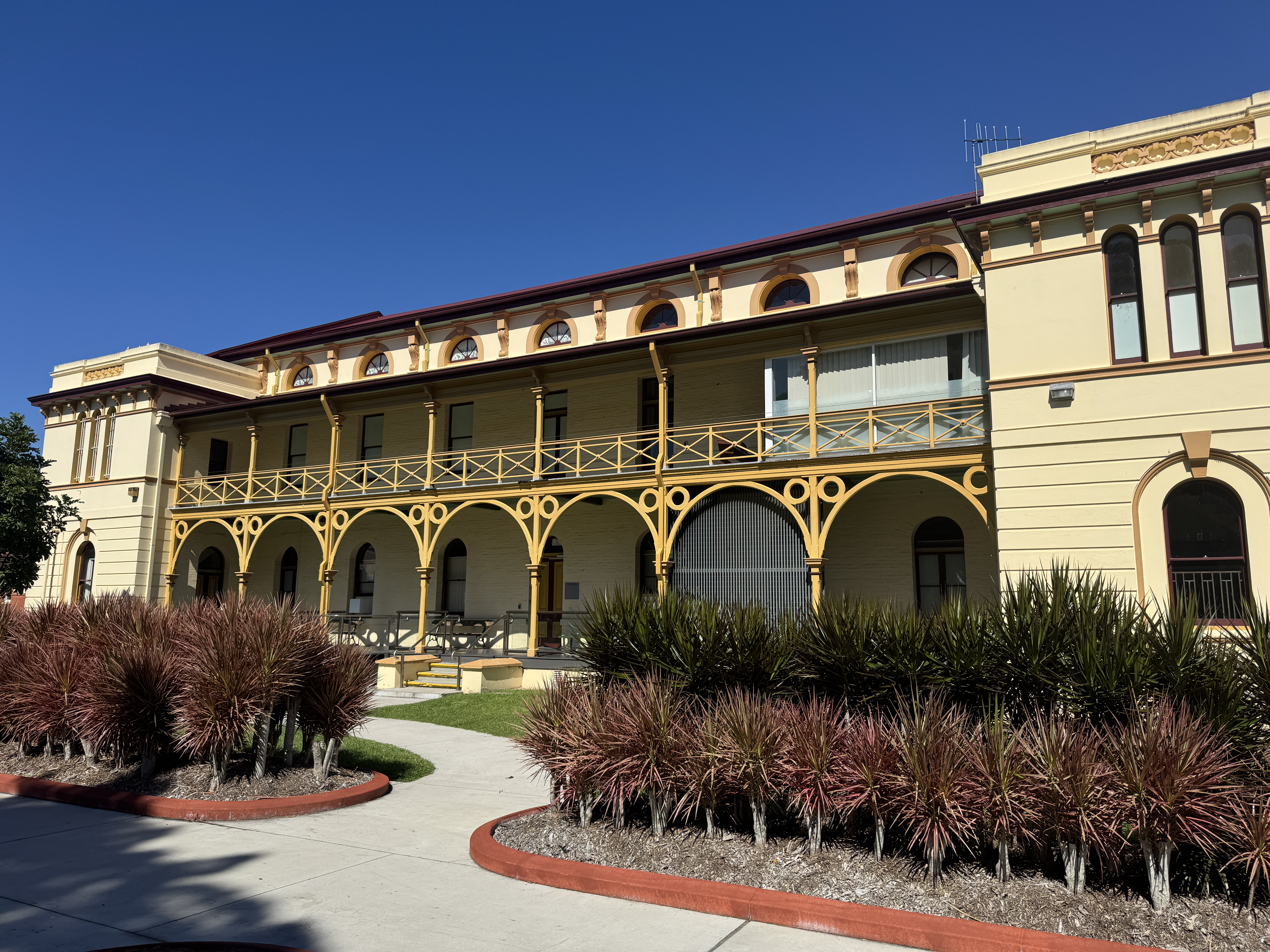
Maryborough Court House, viewed from Queen's Park, 2025.

Maryborough Courthouse was listed in the Register of the National Estate on 21 March 1978. It was listed on the Queensland Heritage Register on 21 October 1992 having satisfied the following criteria.

The place is important in demonstrating the evolution or pattern of Queensland's history.

The Maryborough Courthouse, constructed in 1877, demonstrates the growth of Maryborough in the 1860s and 1870s as a result of the discovery of gold in Gympie, for which Maryborough became the principal port. The building demonstrates the early civic history of Maryborough and has special social value for the community for its long and continued use as a public building.

The place is important in demonstrating the principal characteristics of a particular class of cultural places.

The Courthouse is a good example of a Queensland courthouse of the nineteenth century, with classical architectural influences, adapted to the sub-tropical Maryborough climate. The layout and form of the building are characteristic of a late nineteenth century courthouse.

The place is important because of its aesthetic significance.

The building has aesthetic significance as a well composed Maryborough landmark with inherent formal qualities, symmetrical massing and repetitive rhythmic detailing which combine to produce a strong composition in its Queens Park setting which contributes to its aesthetic value. The building forms an integral component of a civic precinct with the adjacent State Government Offices, which although later are clearly designed to harmonise with the Courthouse.

The place has a special association with the life or work of a particular person, group or organisation of importance in Queensland's history.

The Courthouse has special associations with its designer, FDG Stanley who was Queensland's most prolific Colonial Architect.
