= Duncan Chapman =

Australian Army officer (1888–1916)

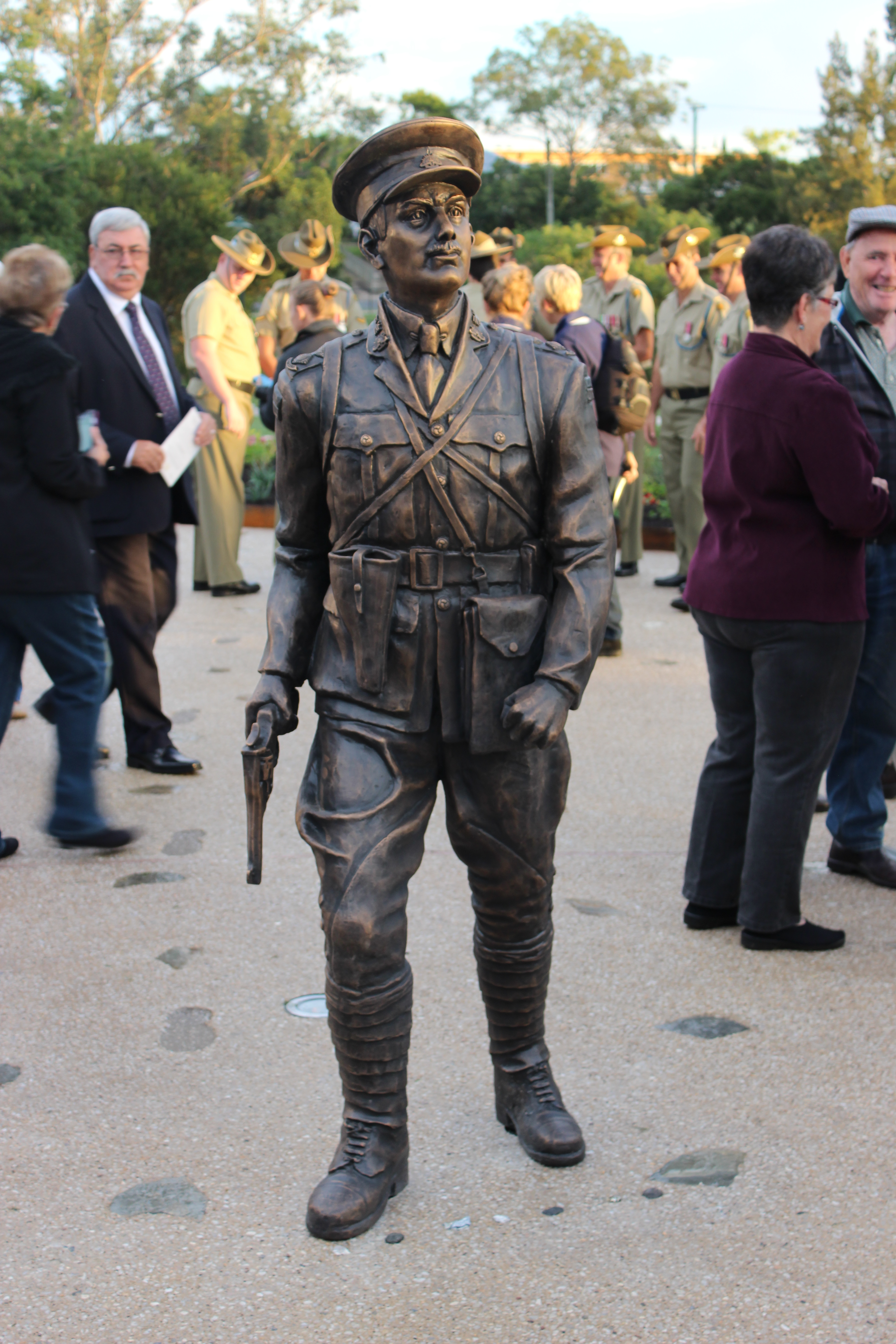
Life-sized bronze statue Lieutenant Duncan Chapman, first man ashore at Gallipoli on 25 April 1915

Major Duncan Chapman (5 May 1888 – 6 August 1916) was an Australian Army officer with the 9th Battalion and 45th Battalion of Australian Imperial Force during World War I. Chapman was the first man to step ashore at the Gallipoli landing with the 9th Battalion, 3rd Brigade on 25 April 1915. A statue of Chapman was unveiled in his home town of Maryborough, Queensland to commemorate the centenary of the Gallipoli landing.

== Early life ==
Duncan Chapman was born on 15 May 1888 in Maryborough, Queensland, the son of Robert and Eugenie Chapman. His mother died when he was young. Chapman attended Maryborough Grammar School. At the outbreak of World War I Chapman was residing in Brisbane and working as paymaster.

== Military career ==
Prior to World War I, Chapman had served for six months with the Wide Bay Regiment, six months with the Kennedy Regiment. and three years with the 7th Infantry where he held the rank of lieutenant.

He was assigned to the 9th Battalion and embarked from Brisbane in September 1914 aboard troop transport ship SS Omrah.

Chapman was the first man to step ashore at Gallipoli on 25 April 1915.

He was later transferred to the 45th Battalion. Chapman was killed in action on 6 August 1916 at Pozieres, Somme, France and was interred at Pozieres British Cemetery.

== Commemoration ==
On 24 April 2015, as part of the commemoration of centenary of the Gallipoli landing during World War I, a life-sized, bronze statue of Lieutenant Duncan Chapman was unveiled at a dawn service at Queen's Park, Maryborough, Queensland.
