= Bulimba State School =

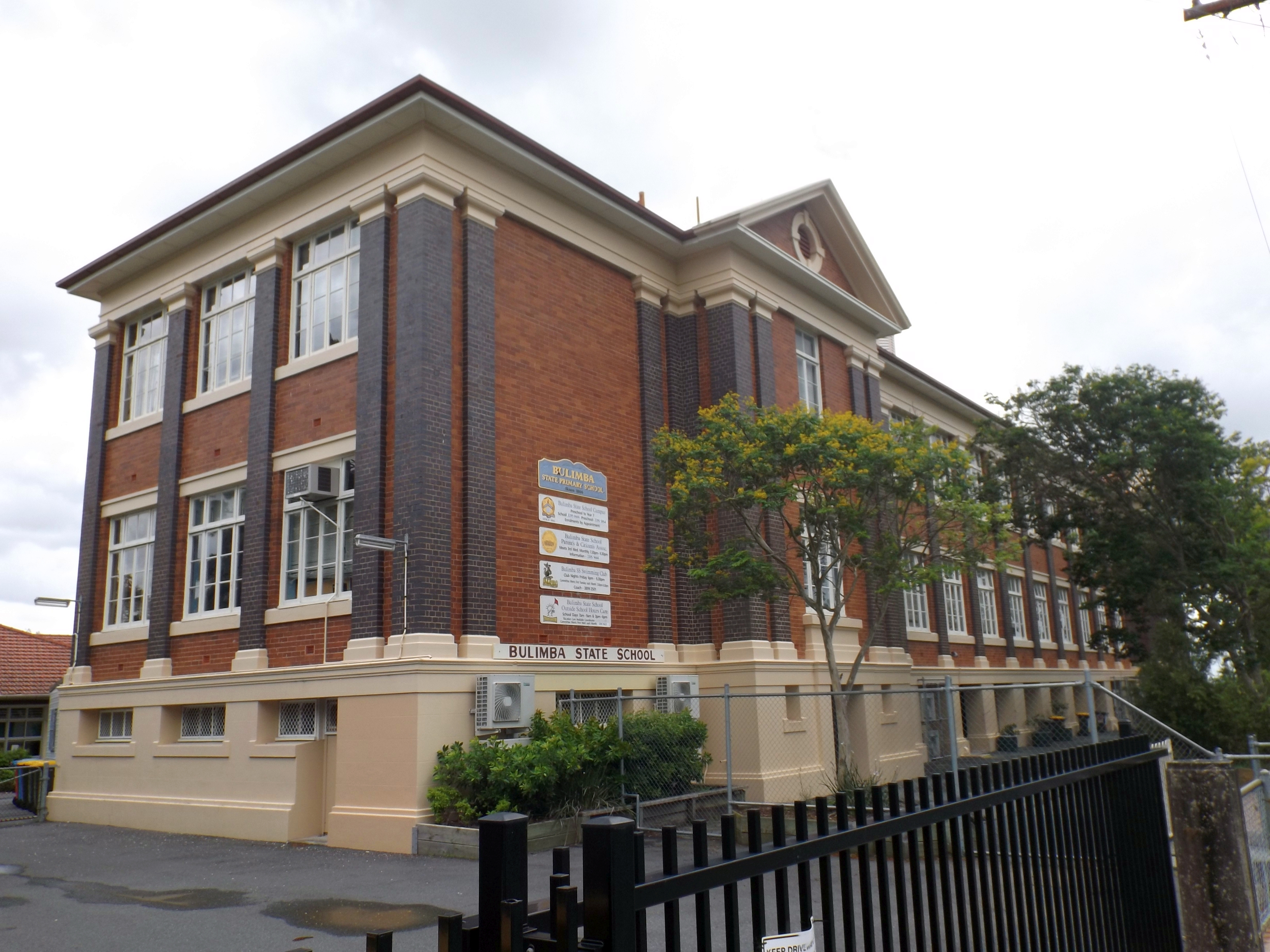
- The school in 2015

- Location within Queensland Location within Australia
- 27.4527°S 153.064°E
- Location: 261 Oxford Street, Bulimba, Queensland, Australia

History
- Design period: 1840s–1860s (mid-19th century)
- Built: 1915–1955

Queensland Heritage Register
- Official name: Bulimba State School
- Type: state heritage (landscape, built)
- Designated: 26 November 1999
- Reference no.: 601874
- Significant period: 1860s, 1910s, 1930s (historical); 1910s (fabric infants' school); 1915–ongoing (social); 1930s
- Significant components: swimming pool, classroom/classroom block/teaching area, sports field/oval/playing field, wall/s – retaining, school/school room, garden/grounds
- Builders: Michael Robinson

Bulimba State School is a heritage-listed state school at 261 Oxford Street, Bulimba, Queensland, Australia. It was built from 1915 to 1955. It was added to the Queensland Heritage Register on 26 November 1999.

== History ==
Bulimba State School was first established in 1866 and contains several generations of buildings and structures that have been erected by the Department of Public Works to meet the growing needs of the community and are representative of some of the developments in education policy in Queensland since that time.

Prior to the establishment of the Bulimba State School, classes were held initially at Bulimba House and then at the Baptist Church. In April 1866, a public meeting was held in the Bulimba Ferry Hotel with a view to raising funds for the construction of a National School. As the first settled agricultural district in the colony, the need for such a school had been felt for some time, but had been prevented by limited funds. Subscriptions of £61 were made at the meeting. Through submissions from the meeting and the subsequent actions of a building committee, an agreement was reached by the Government to establish the school.

In June 1866 tenders were called to construct a 18 by 14 feet (5.5 m × 4.3 m) school building and teacher's residence. Michael Robinson's tender of £230 was accepted due for completion by the following October. In the interim, the school opened on Monday 16 July 1866 in the Wesleyan Chapel.

The first school building and residence were aligned and located at the top of the site in the south east corner facing south-west. As the district prospered and enrolments grew, extra classrooms were required and two additional timber wings were added to the school, which was raised at the turn of the century to allow for eight teaching rooms at ground level.

Further additions were required within a decade and, in 1915, a separate infants building was erected facing Oxford Street. It was a highset timber-framed building erected on timber stumps to provide toilets and a play space underneath the building. It was clad in weatherboards with an asbestos cement slate roof and was lined internally with tongue and groove v-jointed boards to the walls and coved ceiling. The hat rooms at each end of the verandah were unlined internally and the remainder of the verandah had vertical balustrading. Two flights of uncovered external timber stairs provided access to the verandah between which the teachers' room was attached. The building comprised three classrooms with southern lighting and ventilation provided by a large bank of windows comprising casements, centre pivoting sashes and hoppers at the top to provide a variety of ventilation options. This arrangement was repeated, at the eastern and western ends of the building, both of which were protected by sunshades.

There were many representations made by the staff, the Parents and Citizen's Association, school committees, and local politicians during the late twenties and thirties to accommodate the ever-growing school population. In the early thirties, enrolments exceeded 520, of which over 150 were infants and it was resolved that the group of older timber classrooms should be replaced with a new building to accommodate 400, allowing the infants annexe, which was in good condition, to remain.

The effects of the economic depression on building work in Queensland in the 1930s was dramatic and building work came to a standstill. The Queensland Government committed to providing impetus to the economy by embarking on capital works and relief works building programs from the early thirties until the late forties.

The relief works program favoured works involving local manual labour. It was through this scheme that the Bulimba State School's site was levelled off and tennis and basketball courts were built in 1935, followed by the erection of retaining walls to two frontages and to the tennis court, which were completed in 1937 to drawings prepared by Gilbert Robert Beveridge. Beveridge prepared the plans for the new school building which was one of many substantial two- and three-storey schools built during this time, providing tangible proof of the Government's commitment to remedy the unemployment situation.

The brick Bulimba State School building was completed in 1938 and cost £21,965. The building comprised two storeys and a basement constructed of brick and concrete with a tile roof. The Ground floor was to provide for six class rooms (240 pupils) two teacher's rooms and a clerk rooms. The first floor was to provide for seven classrooms (272 pupils), one teacher's room, and a cloak room – a total accommodation of 512 pupils. The Basement contained play areas and lavatories for teachers and pupils and a complete drainage system was provided with septic tank.

The next phase of major building activity occurred in the fifties. Around 1952, the Infant School must have suffered from some form of subsidence, as a program of works was initiated to include rectification work, general plumbing and straightening of the building and strengthening of the roof. Southern windows to the end classrooms were replaced with hoppers at this time and other general improvements were made.

The swimming pool and dressing sheds were erected in 1955, in the location of a disused tennis court, with funds raised from parents and supporters during 1953–55 and subsidised by the Queensland Government.

In 1957, a new two-storey classroom addition at the northern end of the building above the single storey female toilets provided the building with its present symmetrical form. Plans for future extensions to this building, with wings on the western face at the northern and southern ends, were not proceeded with and, in 1959, a highset timber-framed building supported on an open web truss system on concrete stumps was erected.

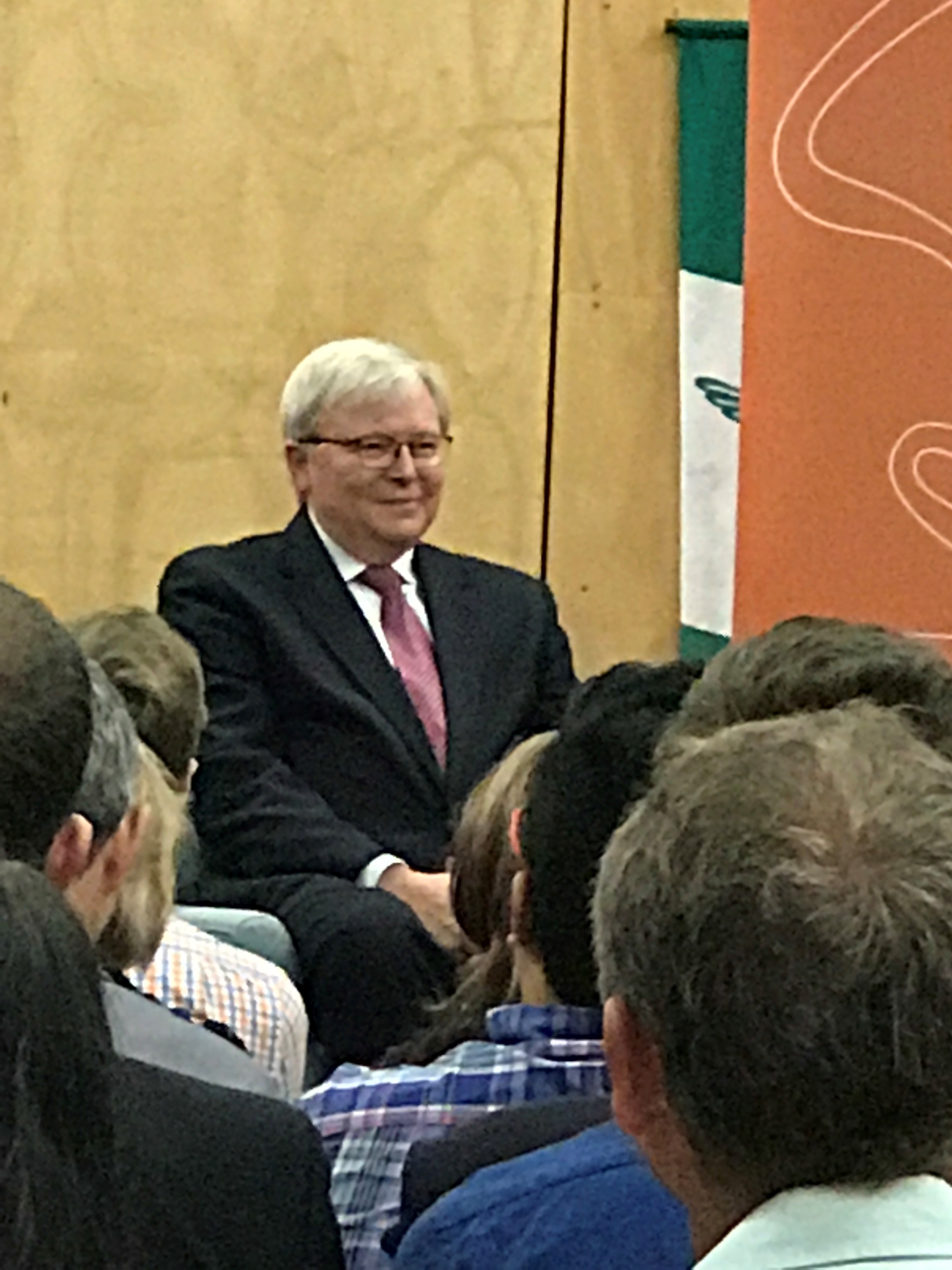
Kevin Rudd at the launch of the first volume of his autobiography in the school hall, 25 October 2017

After peaking in the early sixties to in excess of 950 students, enrolments gradually declined to 242 in 1988. With the redevelopment of the area in the decade following, younger families have moved back into the area and at 2017 the school enrolments were 820.

The school celebrated its 150th anniversary by holding a Bulimba Heritage Weekend (22–23 July 2016) which included a gala dinner, DVD, and Commemorative book "Play the Game" published by Russell Turner, Jim Tunstall, and the Bulimba District Historical Society.

On 25 October 2017 in the school's hall, former Prime Minister Kevin Rudd launched the first volume of his autobiography "Not for the faint-hearted : a personal reflection on life, politics and purpose" which chronicled his life until becoming prime minister in 2007. The school is within Rudd's former electorate of Griffith.

In 2019, Michael Zeuschner, who had been the school's principal since 1995 moved to Mansfield State School as the new Acting Principal.

== Description ==
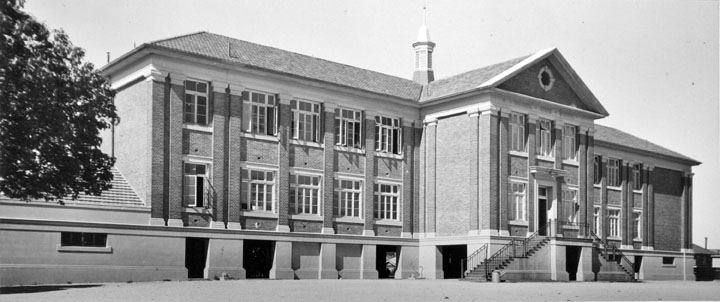
Bulimba State School, 1946

Bulimba State School is located on a 1.88 hectares (4.6 acres) site and is bound by Oxford Street to the north, Wentworth parade to the East, Riding Road to the West and by Barton Parade and freehold property to the South. It is a steeply sloping west facing site with levelled areas occupied by school buildings and parade and play areas at the top of the site. Pathways west of Block B and south of Block C wind down the steep embankment to the netball courts, cricket facilities and bottom oval on more level ground at the Riding Road and Barton Parade boundaries to the site.

The school buildings and structures comprise Block A, B, C and D (a demountable classroom), a new administration and resource centre and a timber framed classroom block under construction. Concrete walls retain both Wentworth Parade and Oxford Street (from the corner to the swimming pool) boundaries. A tennis court is located on the north-eastern corner, several metres above street level. Between the tennis court and the swimming pool, the demountable building -Block D, a shelter shed and the adventure playground are located.

Block A and B form the eastern and northern boundaries to the parade area, part of which is now occupied by the new outdoor learning area and verandahs of the new resource and administration building. A new classroom building is located to the west of Block B.

The in ground concrete swimming pool has covered seating and changing rooms enclosing it to the north, east and west. Block C, the former infant school and now used as the Preschool, is located to the west of the swimming pool and faces Oxford Street.

Block A is a symmetrical two storey load bearing brick building with basement and hipped terracotta tiled roof. The primary and secondary entrances to the building are expressed by a projected pedimented gable wing to the west and a pair of breakfronts to the east. A prominent fleche is centrally located.

The treatment of the elevations creates a basement level distinct from the two floors of the school proper above. The load bearing brick work to the basement is rendered and ruled to form a plinth upon which bays of stretcher bond red brickwork are relieved with pilasters of contrasting Flemish bond dark glazed brickwork shafts with cement rendered bases and capitals of restrained detail. The horizontal banding of the frieze to the pedimented gable and breakfronts continues below the eaves around the perimeter of the building. The main entry is expressed by a pedimented doorway and the symmetry reinforced by two straight flight of stairs with half landing from the north and south.

At basement level, a play space occupies the area between the north and south stairwells with boys' lavatories at the southern end of the building and girls lavatories to the north. Separate facilities were provided for infants, older children and teachers and have now been altered to include a parents' room and storage areas. Seats to curtain walls, drinking taps and troughs, and store areas under main entry stair are also located in the basement which has a low floor to floor height compared to the floors above. Detailing in the play area includes bullnose brickwork on freestanding and engaged piers, eliminating right angle corners to reduce injury.

The classrooms have timber floors supported on a series of articulated steel beams expressed in the ceiling detailing and stairwells; corridors and utility areas have suspended concrete floors. Downpipes are located within the walls. Four four-light casement windows with fanlights above provide ventilation to the corridor and into the classroom through double hung windows

On the ground floor, the main entry hall separates the office and head teacher's rooms. The hall leads to the centre of a north–south corridor which provides access to five classrooms between the north and south stair halls. The central three classrooms are divided by folding partition doors. A cloak room and cleaner's sink are provided at the eastern end of each stairwell. Another classroom and cloak room is located in the end bay at the southern end of the building. A similar layout exists on the first floor.

Block B is a high set timber-framed building supported on steel open web joists with a cantilevered portion supporting the verandah. Stairs at the eastern and western ends provide access to a narrow verandah on the northern side of the building which contains a continuous hat and bag rack and provides access to the three classrooms. This building is of a type of which there are numerous examples, several of which are more comparatively intact and which represent a more extensive use of this type of structure.

Block C is a high set timber-framed structure on concrete stumps. Three classrooms have been made into two and folding partitions have been removed as well as large sections of walls to the verandahs. The verandahs have been enclosed and stairs have been altered. The roof sheeting has been more recently replaced with corrugated iron and the roof fleche removed. Ceilings are coved and lined with tongue and groove V jointed boards verandahs enclosed stair altered, windows altered etc. This building is also of a type where there are many more intact and representative examples throughout Queensland.

Biscoe Wilson Architects later oversaw the construction of the new 10 General Learning Areas (GLA) and Library along Oxford Street.

== Heritage listing ==
Bulimba State School was listed on the Queensland Heritage Register on 26 November 1999, having satisfied the following criteria:

The place is important in demonstrating the evolution or pattern of Queensland's history.

At Bulimba State School, established in 1866, the variety of building types and structures from different periods are representative of some of the many developments in education policy in Queensland and demonstrate the evolution of the school and the community.

The brick Bulimba State School building and the concrete retaining walls and associated fences and gates constructed in 1937–1938 are significant as a tangible demonstration of the Queensland Government's commitment to providing impetus to an economy and building industry reeling from the effects of the 1930s depression. The retaining walls, fences, gates and courts also have special significance for the local community as the work relief scheme employed local workers.

The main building, Block A, erected in 1937–38 is significant as a substantial interwar building which reflects the growth and stability of the population of Bulimba.

The place is important in demonstrating the principal characteristics of a particular class of cultural places.

Bulimba State School demonstrates the principle characteristics of a primary school precinct with a hierarchy of structures and open spaces built over several generations for educational purposes by the Department of Education. The school's structures and grounds provide a series of formal and informal spaces including open playground spaces, a formal parade ground, pathways, sports areas, swimming pool and tennis court facilities as well as undercroft and verandah areas.

It is an excellent and intact urban example of a substantial interwar building and displays the particular characteristics of this school building type. The use of brick and restrained detailing is typical for government buildings of the period, and Bulimba State School principal building follows in the tradition of fine buildings erected by the Queensland Public Works Department.

The place is important because of its aesthetic significance.

It is a fine example of a school building designed by the office of the Queensland Government Architect and has aesthetic significance brought about by its massing and restrained classical detailing.

Bulimba State School and grounds is also significant for the landmark value of its principal building and setting which provides a reference point in the community. The imposing massing and scale of the brick building looms high atop Carlton Hill above surrounding suburban development with commanding views afforded both to and from the site to Moreton Bay, Hamilton and New Farm.

The place has a strong or special association with a particular community or cultural group for social, cultural or spiritual reasons.

Bulimba State School is valued by its community for the essential community function it provides and as a link between the past and present through its long traditional connection with the area.

The place has a special association with the life or work of a particular person, group or organisation of importance in Queensland's history.

Bulimba State School principal building follows in the tradition of fine buildings erected by the Queensland Public Works Department.
