= Queen's Park, Maryborough =

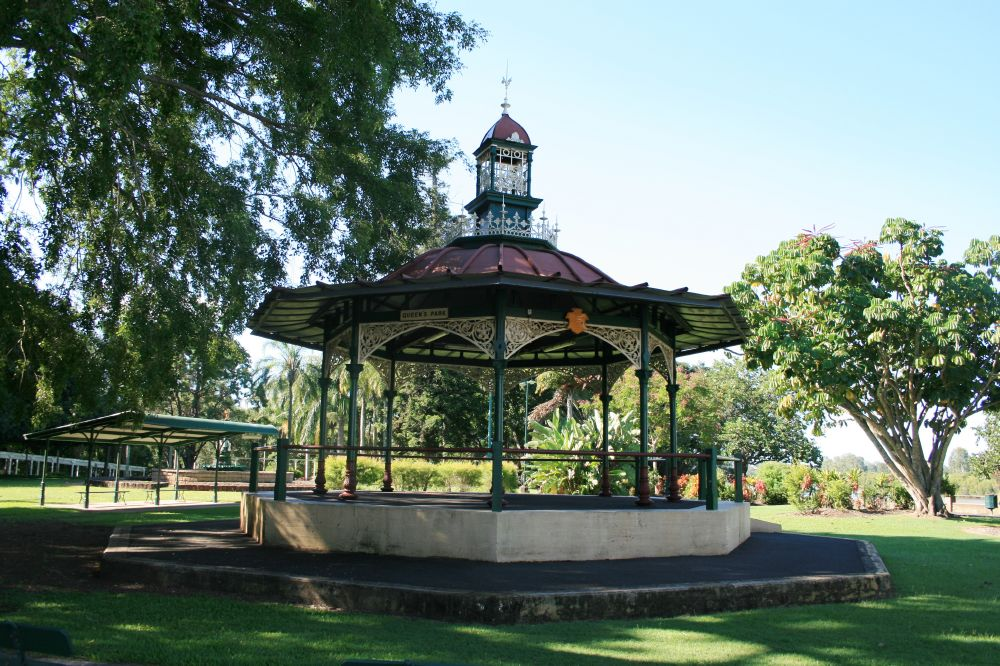
- Band rotunda in Queen's Park, 2009

- Location within Queensland
- 25.5361°S 152.7045°E
- Location: Sussex Street, Maryborough, Fraser Coast Region, Queensland, Australia

History
- Design period: 1870s–1890s (late 19th century)
- Built: c. 1873–c. 1990

Queensland Heritage Register
- Official name: Queen's Park, War Memorial and Entrance Gates; Bandstand; Banyan Fig; Bunya Pine; Crows Ash; Sausage Tree
- Type: state heritage (built, landscape)
- Designated: 21 October 1992
- Reference no.: 600708
- Significant period: 1890–1922 (fabric); 1873–ongoing (social)
- Significant components: pathway/walkway, memorial – fountain, fernery, lake / pond / waterway, memorial – obelisk, bandstand/rotunda, trees/plantings, tree groups – avenue of, memorial – gate/s, memorial – soldier statue

Queen's Park is a heritage-listed botanic garden at Sussex Street, Maryborough, Fraser Coast Region, Queensland, Australia. A reserve for the botanical gardens was gazetted in October 1873. It contains the Maryborough War Memorial. It was added to the Queensland Heritage Register on 21 October 1992.

== History ==
Since it was gazetted in 1873, Queen's Park has undergone changes in use and in architectural and aesthetic features associated with the park.

=== Public parkland ===
In 1842, Andrew Petrie discovered the Monaboola stream, later the Mary River, upon which Maryborough grew as a port. In July 1847, Surveyor James Charles Burnett was sent to survey the area of the Burnett River and to comment on the conditions. The Wide Bay River (after Petrie's Monaboola) was renamed the Mary River by the Governor Charles Augustus FitzRoy after his wife. By July 1850, Surveyor Hugh Roland Labatt arrived in what was to become Maryborough with instructions to "examine the River Mary is to enable you to suggest to me the best site or sites for the laying of the town..." The site recommended for the town by Labatt was not where the initial settlement was established but further east. In 1852, the first sales of land at the present site of Maryborough were sold, and the settlement on the north side of the river became deserted, as larger vessels could not access these wharves.

The 1850s and 1860s were a time of growth and expansion in Maryborough, the first hospital was underway by 1859, a courthouse and lock-up was constructed in 1857; the School of Arts was established in 1861; also that year Messrs Gladwell and Greathead began the first sawmill. Upon the separation of Queensland in 1859, Maryborough was declared a port of entry. In March 1861, Maryborough was proclaimed a municipality, and Henry Palmer became the first Mayor. Palmer helped shape Maryborough's destiny during its early years. During a meeting of the Municipal Council of 3 November 1865, Palmer proposed that "immediate application be made by the Council to the government for all the portion of the Wharf Reserve not required for shipping purposes to be used as a public garden and for recreation purposes".

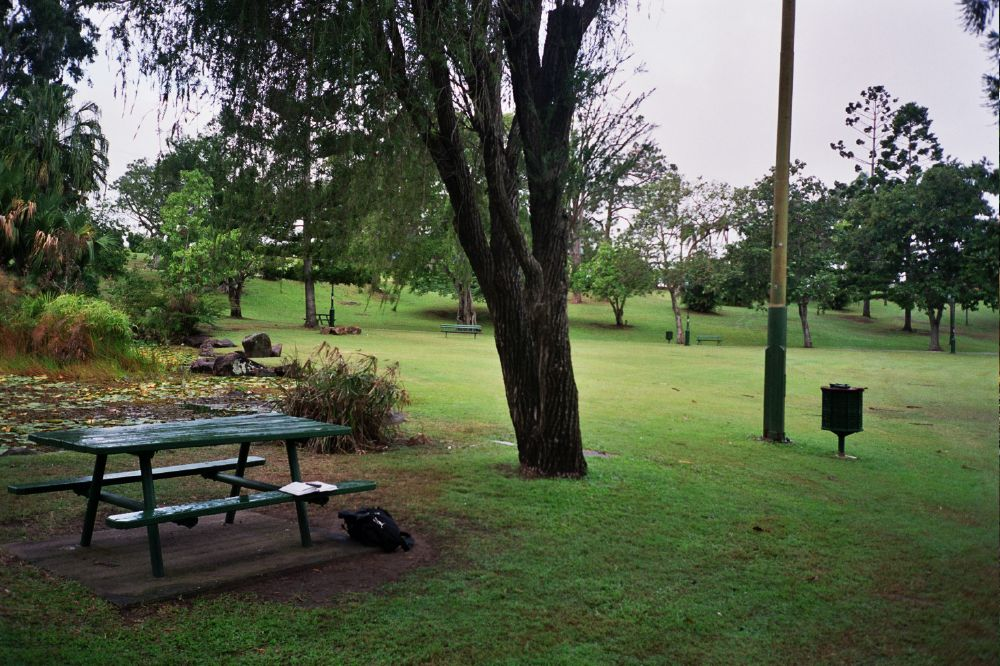
Recreation areas, 2005

During the mid-1840s, amateur botanist, explorer and sometimes businessman, John Carne Bidwill collected specimens of trees from the Moreton Bay region. This tree was known to the Indigenous population by various names including Bunya Bunya. In local European circles, it was called Pinus petrianna, a description applied to the species either by or in recognition of pioneer free settler Andrew Petrie who, it is claimed by the Petrie family, was the discoverer of the species. Bidwill sent his specimen to Kew Gardens in London, where it classified as being a new species of the Araucaria genus. In recognition of Bidwill's voluminous collectings in both eastern Australia and New Zealand, 'Petrie's pine' was officially recognised as Araucaria bidwillii.

=== Botanic gardens ===
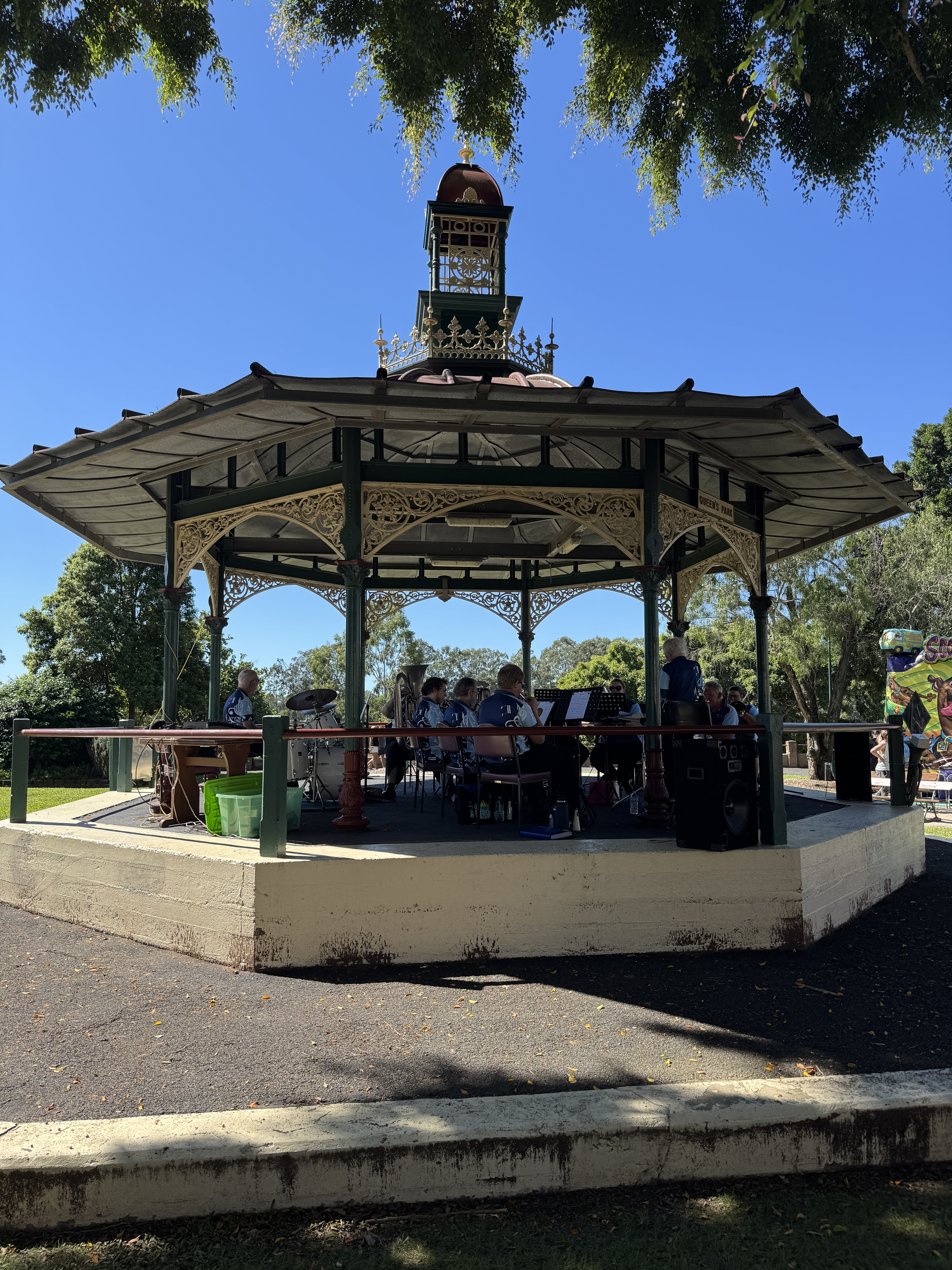
The band rotunda in Maryborough's Queen's Park, in use by the Maryborough City Excelsior Band, 2025.

In 1854 Sir Charles Moore and Brisbane Botanical Gardens Curator Walter Hill made a collection of specimens from Bidwill's garden. The bunya pine, located in the south-east corner of the Park, near the entrance gates, is thought to be a surviving tree from the collection . Amongst Bidwill's plants was at least one specimen of sausage tree (Kigelia pinnata), also known as a Fetish tree. The sausage tree in the park is thought to be a surviving tree from Bidwill's collection.

By the late 1860s, the Brisbane Botanic Gardens were a well established centre for all things botanic in Queensland. A popular means of show casing the work of the gardens was participation in the colonial exhibitions. Walter Hill launched an extremely successful exhibit at the Intercolonial Exhibition held in Sydney in 1867. Reports in the press were favourable and had the effect of heightening community awareness of the potential use of gardens. Capitalising on this increased public perception, Hill set out to expand the botanic work in Queensland. At this time premium parks in Toowoomba and Ipswich were already established. As a result of this activity, Hill set out to insert working gardens in other places through Queensland.

Urban public parks became a popular vehicle for 19th century movements concerned with public health; the park provided a place for the outdoor recreation of those unable to afford private gardens and improved the environment of crowded central city and town areas. Botanic Gardens were started as part of an increasing interest in scientific understanding of the natural world. A botanic gardens was established in Brisbane in 1855 in response to 19th century interest in botany which saw botanic gardens established around the world, particularly in those colonised areas of the world where little formal knowledge of the interaction between geography and botany existed. An integral part of the Brisbane Botanic Gardens was a series of branch gardens in provincial areas throughout Queensland which provided botanic data across the wide spectrum of Queensland ecosystems.

Before proclamation as a park, the Queen's Park site was the location of a boiling down works operated by Edmund Blucher. Following the gazettal of the site as a Reserve for Botanical Gardens in October 1873, Trustees were appointed. They were Henry Palmer, Peter Graham, George Howard, Henry Stoward and Richard Bingham Sheridan, who was subsequently elected as Chairman by his fellow Trustees.

Sheridan was a public servant and politician was born in Ireland. He arrived in New South Wales in 1842 and joined the Customs Department in February 1846. In February 1853 because of ill health, he was transferred to Moreton Bay. On 10 December 1859, Sheridan was appointed sub-collector of customs at Maryborough. Sheridan was deeply involved in the life of Maryborough and was respected for his integrity, fairness and humanity. He initiated the Botanic Gardens and was involved in the foundation of the School of Arts and the hospital and was the first chairman of the building society. Sheridan won the Maryborough seat in the Legislative Assembly on 17 August 1883 and held it until 5 May 1888. In 1885 he had become a trustee of the Brisbane Botanic Gardens.

In 1876, Sheridan, submitted the second annual report on the Botanic Gardens, Maryborough. The report highlighted a number of factors relating to the park. The past season was considered to have been a highly successful one. At the time, the grounds placed under the control of the Trustees consisted of detached pieces, amounting to about 70 acres (28 ha). One block, known as the Recreation Reserve, contained about 58 acres (23 ha), and was fenced with a "substantial two-rail fence, and partially planted, and suitable gates are placed wherever found requisite, for public convenience". The remainder, about 12 acres (4.9 ha), which was known as the Botanic Gardens, "..is that to which the Trustees devoted most attention, as it is situated immediately within the most populous part of town, and to some extent stretching along the river bank, renders it the favourite resort of the inhabitants, as evidenced by the great numbers who frequent the place..." The Botanic Gardens were planted with '...useful and ornamental trees, shrubs and flowers. By 1876, the Botanic Gardens also contained an ornamental bridge and a gardener's cottage, as well as the construction of fencing. By 1876, several new walks had been laid out, flower beds and borders had been planted, hundreds of rare trees and shrubs had been introduced.

It was also reported in 1876 that:

"the establishment of a Botanic Garden in the town, in addition to the pleasure it gives the local inhabitants, by affording them a place of healthful recreation and instruction, has spread a taste for floriculture throughout the entire district. In addition to supplying many person with ornamental plants and seeds, the Trustees have had the pleasure of being able to distribute amongst several sugar planters, sugar cane cuttings raised from a number of choice varieties kindly supplied by Mr Walter Hill from the Brisbane Botanic Garden last year; besides they are forming a nursery for new and useful fruit trees and vegetables, from which they hope in time to supply plants and seeds to all who may require them...The Trustees acknowledge, with thanks, having received donations of plants and seeds from the undermentioned gentlemen - Mr Walter Hill, Botanic Gardens, Brisbane; the Acclimatisation Society; Mr Armitage, Mackay; Mr Woodhouse, Rockhampton; and from Messrs Byerly, Barton, Brown, Byers, Denman, Byrne and Jones".

Early photographs of the area dated c. 1862 show the crows ash (Flindersia australis). The crows ash is a species common to the original rainforests of coastal south east Queensland. Crows ash timber was used extensively for fencing, flooring, window sills and exterior decorative trimmings. Other historical photographs indicate that the banyan fig (Ficus benghalensis) was planted by at least 1905. Originating from Bengal in India, this particular species of fig is rare in Australia. The species is typified by its area roots which become multiple trunks and huge horizontal branches.

=== Melville Fountain ===
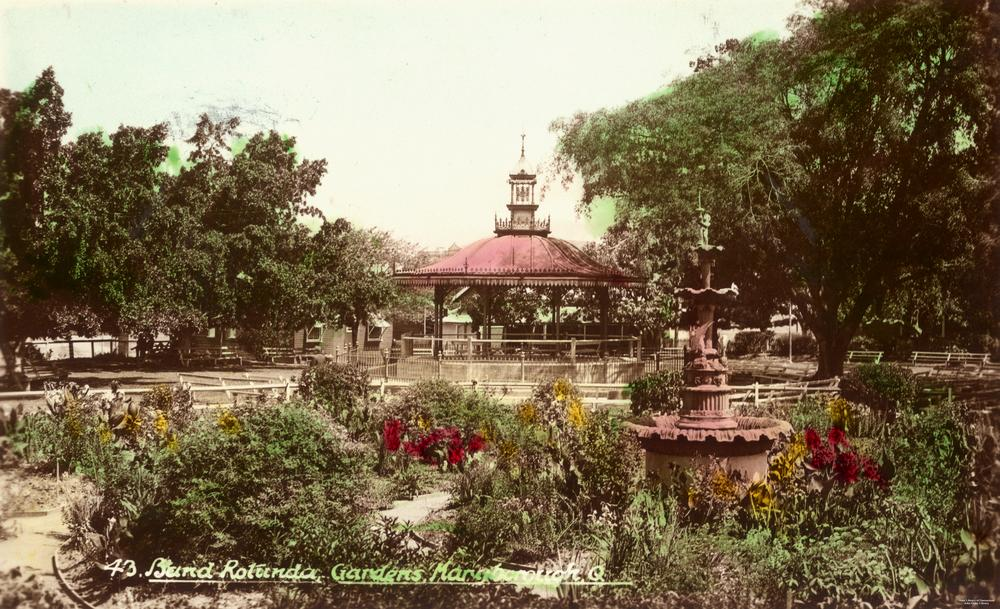
Band rotunda, circa 1930

In 1890, the Melville or Fairy Fountain was unveiled under the rotunda. This was bequeathed by Miss Janet Melville to the City of Maryborough in memory of her brother, Andrew Wedderburn Melville. On his death in 1882 Janet inherited most of his fortune which she distributed locally. On her death she left £500 for the erection of a fountain and bandstand in the gardens.

The fountain chosen was exhibited at the Glasgow International Exhibition in 1888 and arrived in Maryborough in December and was erected early the following year. Although band concerts were held in the pavilion there were some difficulties encountered viewing the members of the band as the structure sat on ground level, not elevated as is normally the case of bandstands. Early in the twentieth century the bandstand was moved 18 metres (59 ft) and re-erected on a concrete plinth.

The rotunda was imported from Glasgow, from the William MacFarlane & Co, Saracen in Scotland. The Hon Andrew Wilson MLC had chosen the structure in Glasgow after visiting the area. As constructed the rotunda was surrounded by a cast iron pilastered fence bed in a stone plinth.

At some time the fountain was shifted to allow the rotunda to be used as a bandstand. The fountain was a gift to the city from Miss Janet Melville who gave large sums of money to various Maryborough institutions including the hospital. The trustees of Janet's will authorised the Hon A.H. Wilson, to investigate suitable fountains during a Scotland holiday. Wilson selected the fairy fountain at the Glasgow International Exhibition and it arrived in Maryborough on 31 December 1889.

Janet Melville was one of the most generous benefactors in Maryborough, she came to Australia from Scotland with her brother Andrew Wedderburn Melville and his wife Maria in 1849. Andrew wrote for the Maryborough Chronicle and served a term as Mayor in 1863. He died 5 November 1882 and his wife died 23 October 1890.

A report in the Maryborough Chronicle detailed the unveiling of the fountain:

The Melville Memorial Fountain is now erected under the ornamental pavilion in the Botanic Gardens and is at least an attractive object. From the centre of a large basin rises a column with griffin heads around the cap, which will spout water form their mouths. On the top of the column are three cranes in various attitudes and from the centre rises a funnel shaped tier out of which springs another of a similar design but smaller and in the centre of this is a golden cherub clasping a horn of plenty from which a jet of water is thrown upwards...

In the 19th century, Walter MacFarlane's Saracen foundry was the largest in the world of its day covering ten acres with its own railway station and satellite suburb of Possilpark. The company exported their castings all over the world.

=== Maryborough War Memorial ===
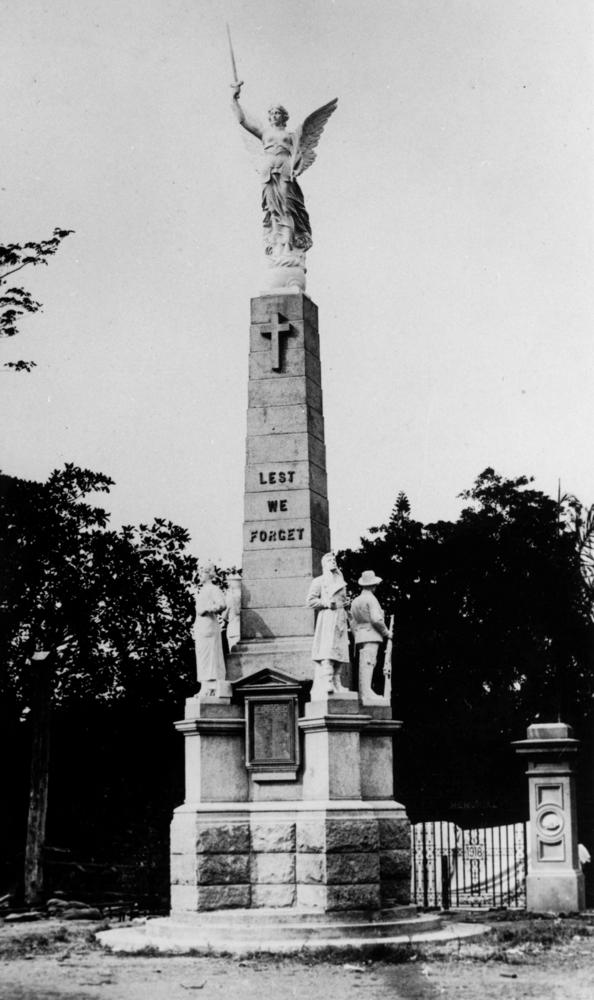
War Memorial, Maryborough, ca. 1922

The Maryborough War Memorial was unveiled on 19 November 1922 by Major General Reginald Spencer-Browne. It was designed by Philip Oliver Ellard Hawkes and produced by local monumental masonry firm Frederick William Webb. The granite and marble memorial honours the 100 local men who fell during the First World War and the 55 who fell in the Second World War.

Originally there were two sets of gates, however the outer pair were removed at some stage. The swing gates are made from British gun metal. The Memorial Gates were cast by the local Croydon Foundry.

In May 1920, a Memorial Committee was formed to collect subscriptions for the erection of a war memorial. The foundation stone was laid on 22 May 1921 by Lieutenant Colonel James Murdoch Archer Durrant, however, fund raising efforts were slow and Maryborough citizens were reminded that suburbs and outlying districts had already erected memorials. It was almost 18 months later that the memorial was finally unveiled.

As well as designing the monument, Hawkes selected the site, arranged importation of the statues through Anselm and Odling of Sydney and supervised the work. His first designs were not accepted by the memorial committee and he was instructed to submit alternatives. This second group of designs was also to be subject to public scrutiny.

Philip Oliver Ellard Hawkes was born in Wagga Wagga, New South Wales in 1882. He worked as an architect in Wagga Wagga, Perth, Melbourne and Launceston before being employed by the Queensland Government in 1909. This was a temporary position from which he resigned in November of the same year. He subsequently worked in Maryborough, Bundaberg and Kingaroy, forming a partnership as Hawkes and Palmer in Kingaroy and Maryborough between 1914 and 1917. In 1919 he was employed by the Commonwealth Government as District Adviser, registering as an architect (Queensland) in 1930.

The bronzework on the monument and the gates were made by Stevenson Brothers at Maryborough's Croyden foundry. At a cost of £2,300, the memorial is the second most expensive in Queensland.

Australia, and Queensland in particular, had few civic monuments before the First World War. The memorials erected in its wake became our first national monuments, recording the devastating impact of the war on a young nation. Australia lost 60 000 from a population of about 4 million, representing one in five of those who served. No previous or subsequent war has made such an impact on the nation.

Even before the end of the war, memorials became a spontaneous and highly visible expression of national grief. To those who erected them, they were as sacred as grave sites, substitute graves for the Australians whose bodies lay in battlefield cemeteries in Europe and the Middle East. British policy decreed that the Empire war dead were to be buried where they fell. The word "cenotaph", commonly applied to war memorials at the time, literally means "empty tomb".

Australian war memorials are distinctive in that they commemorate not only the dead. Australians were proud that their first great national army, unlike other belligerent armies, was composed entirely of volunteers, men worthy of honour whether or not they paid the supreme sacrifice. Many memorials honour all who served from a locality, not just the dead, providing valuable evidence of community involvement in the war. Such evidence is not readily obtainable from military records, or from state or national listings, where names are categorised alphabetically or by military unit.

Australian war memorials are also valuable evidence of imperial and national loyalties, at the time, not seen as conflicting; the skills of local stonemasons, metalworkers and architects; and of popular taste. In Queensland, the soldier statue was the popular choice of memorial, whereas the obelisk predominated in the southern states, possibly a reflection of Queensland's larger working-class population and a lesser involvement of architects.

Many of the First World War monuments have been updated to record local involvement in later conflicts, and some have fallen victim to unsympathetic re-location and repair.

The Maryborough monument includes four statues and a winged figure of victory. Webb arranged for them to be imported from Italy through the Sydney firm, Anselm Odling and Company. Although they were commissioned for use in Queensland, they are very clearly Italian in character. This also occurred with other digger statues imported from Italy, however it is most obvious in this instance due to the number and types of figures. The memorial includes statues of a soldier, a sailor, an airman and Red Cross nurse. The latter, complete with rosary beads, is the most notably Italian in detail. Tablets commemorating the Second World War and subsequent wars were later added.

Since the mid-1990s, the Maryborough City Council and from 2008 the Fraser Coast Regional Council, have undertaken much restorative work to Queen's Park, including reinstating the Cocos Palm Avenue (queen palms), the rose trellis, maze gardens, the Melville Fountain and the Judges' Walk. The pathway in Queen's Park, leading from Bazaar Street to Wharf Street, is known as Judges' Walk, in recognition of the judicial processions which took place there. The judges alighted from their carriages in Bazaar Street and proceeded in their robes to the court house. They were preceded by an escort and were followed by court attendants.

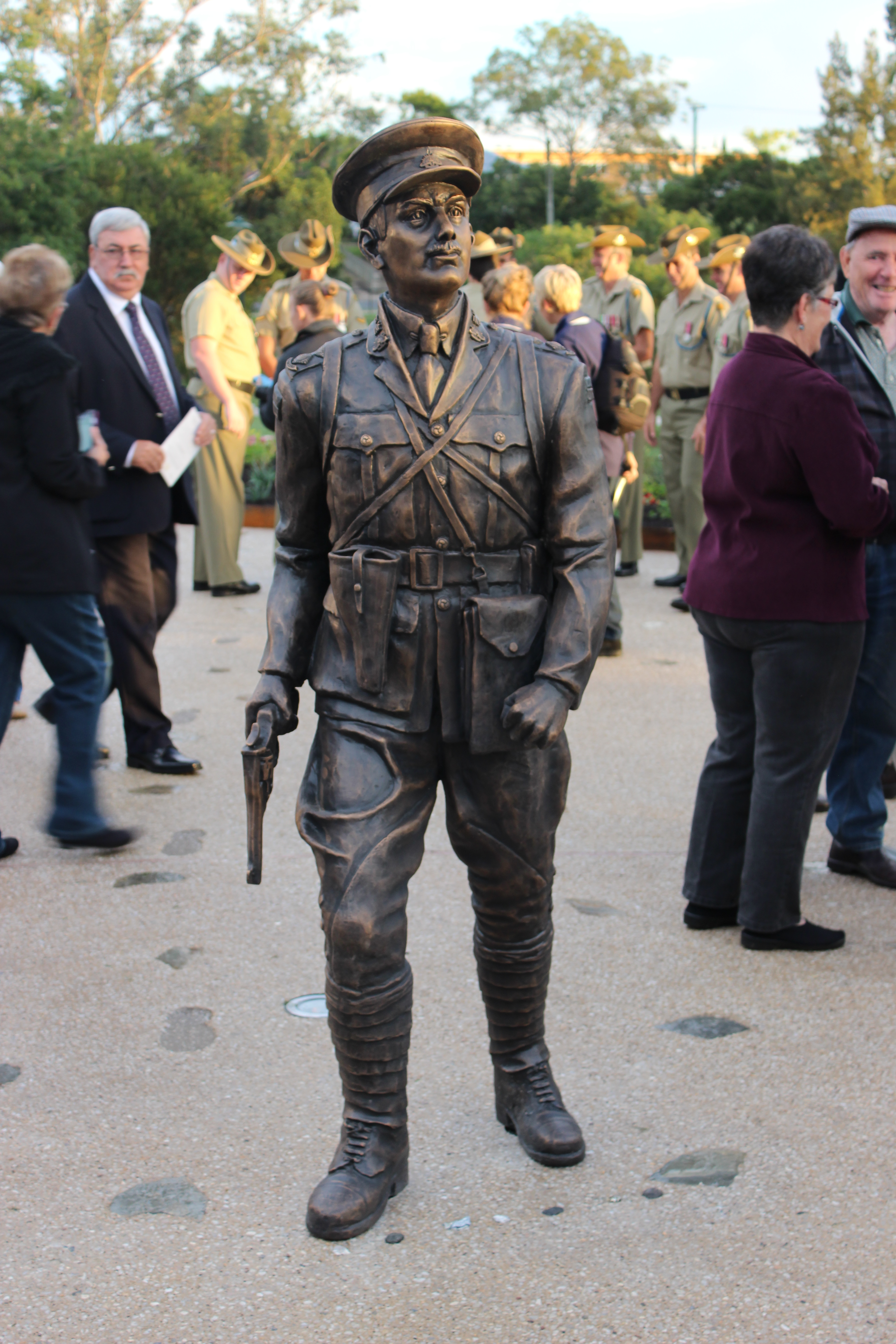
Statue of Lieutenant Duncan Chapman, first man ashore at Gallipoli on 25 April 1915

=== Duncan Chapman statue and Gallipoli to Armistice Memorial ===
On 24 April 2015, as part of the commemoration of centenary of the Gallipoli landing during World War I. A life-sized, bronze statue of Lieutenant Duncan Chapman was unveiled at a dawn service. Chapman was the first man to step ashore at Gallipoli on 25 April 1915 and served with the 45th Battalion. He was born in Maryborough on 15 May 1888 and attended Maryborough Grammar School. He was killed in action on 6 August 1916 at Pozieres, Somme, France and was interred at Pozieres British Cemetery. The Duncan Chapman statue was the start of a larger memorial: the Gallipoli to Armistice Memorial.

On 21 July 2018 the Gallipoli to Armistice Memorial was officially opened by Malcolm Turnbull, Annastacia Palaszczuk and George Seymour. The large memorial features a range of artwork, audio-visual displays, plantings and information panels about World War I.

== Description ==
=== War Memorial ===
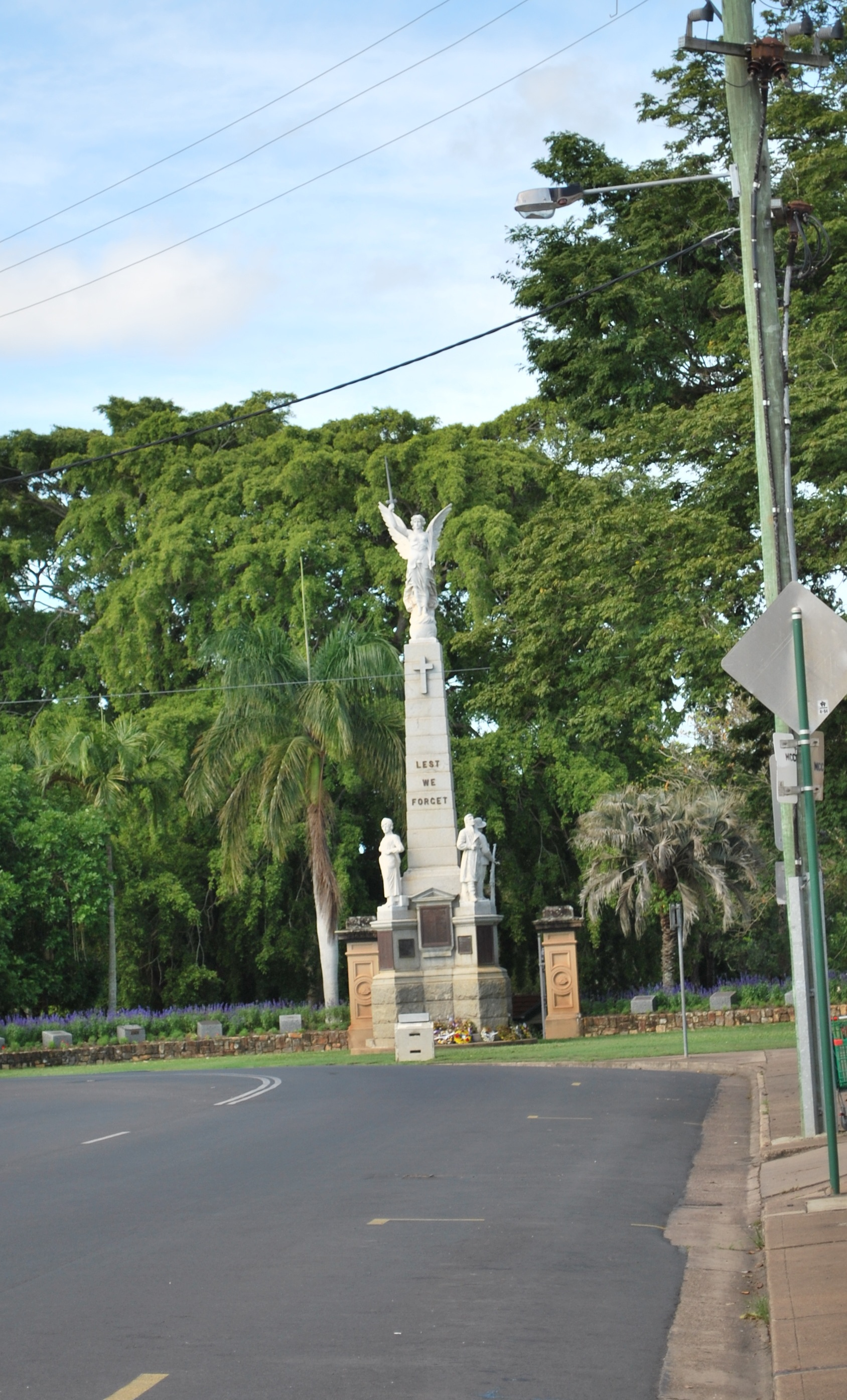
Maryborough War Memorial, 2008

The First World War Memorial is situated in a dominant position at the entrance to the Botanic Gardens, surrounded by a low rock wall garden bed. At the rear of the memorial is a set of large swing gates of wrought iron painted white and bearing commemorative lettering and the Australian Imperial Force badge. The gates are flanked by Helidon sandstone pillars. The memorial stands 45 feet (14 m) to the top of the obelisk and comprises a base, four statues and the obelisk surmounted by a Winged Victory statue.

The grey granite monument sits on two circular concrete steps. The base comprises three layers of banded rock faced granite, cruciform in plan. Above each end of the cross are smooth-faced plinths. Each end face of the cross displays a bronze plaque with the names of the 100 local citizens who fell during the First World War. In the centre of the two front plinths is a larger bronze plaque with a granite triangular pediment detail. The front plinths also have additional bronze plaques commemorating the 55 soldiers who fell in the Second World War.

At each end of the cross stands a Carrara marble statue, facing outward. The statues are life-sized, and represent a Red Cross nurse, a soldier, a sailor and an airman. They all stand at ease and are remarkably Italian in detail.

In the centre of the four statues is a large obelisk sitting on a smooth-faced base capped with cyma recta mouldings. Bronze wreaths are located on the side and rear faces. Latin crosses are attached to the front and rear faces, as are bronze letters forming the words LEST WE FORGET. Surmounting the obelisk is a larger than life-sized Winged Victory figure in Carrara marble.

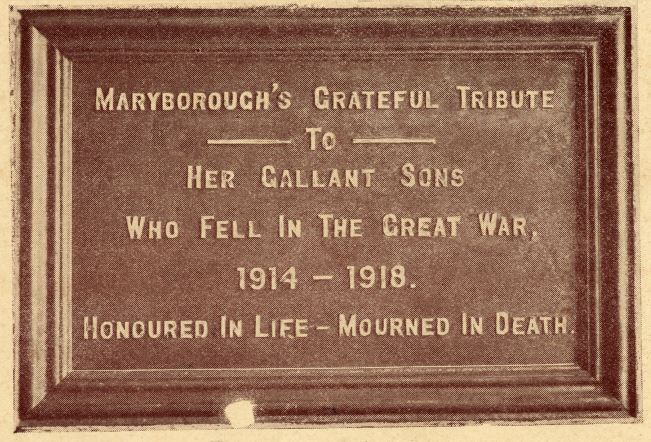
Memorial Tablet, Queen's Park, Maryborough, ca.1922

On either side of the memorial is a laurel wreath with dedication tablets with the following words:

Maryborough's Grateful Tribute to HER GALLANT SONS, Who fell in the Great War, 1914-1918. The bravest thing God ever made, Our deathless dead not once dismayed. Theirs the greater love - Ours the debt unpaid.

=== Entrance Gates ===
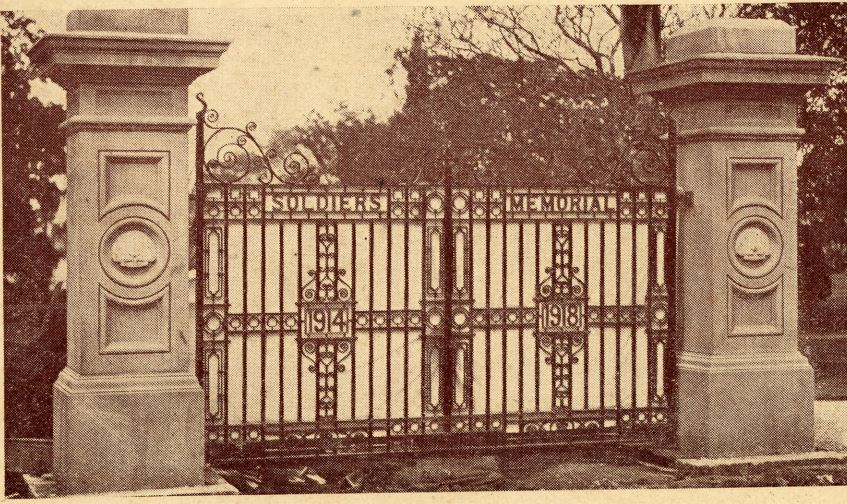
Memorial Gates, Queen's Park, Maryborough, ca.1922

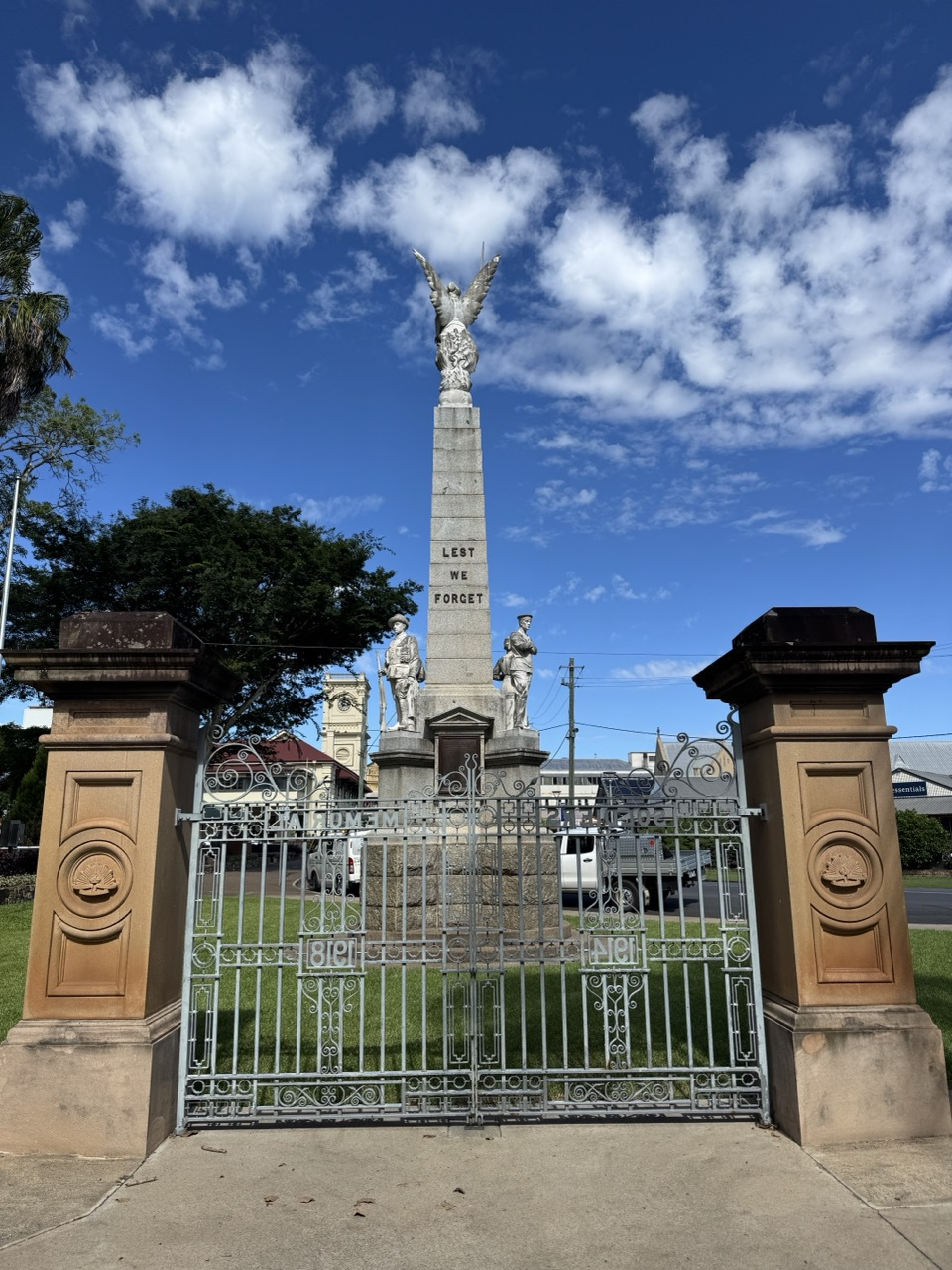
Looking through the gates at Queens Park to the Maryborough War Memorial. April 2025

The entrance gates are located at the rear of the memorial. They comprise a set of large swing gates of painted, wrought iron (British gun metal) bearing commemorative lettering and the AIF badge. The gates are flanked by Helidon sandstone pillars. Originally there were two sets of gates, however the outer pair were removed at some stage.

=== The Bandstand and Melville Fountain ===
The Bandstand is an ornamental pavilion in Queen's Park, Maryborough which was originally constructed as shade over the Melville Memorial Fountain. The pavilion comprises a cast iron ogee curved shade supported on cast iron columns bedded in a concrete plinth. The Melville Fountain is located in near the south-eastern corner of Queen's Park. It is cast iron and form the centre of a large basin a column rises with griffin heads around the cap. Water spouts out of the mouths of the griffins. On the top of the column are three cranes. From the centre rises a two funnel shaped, floral-type tiers, the lower tier larger, with a similarly designed upper tier. In the centre of the upper tier is a cherub clasping a horn of plenty from which a jet of water is thrown upwards.

=== Butchulla Warrior Memorial ===
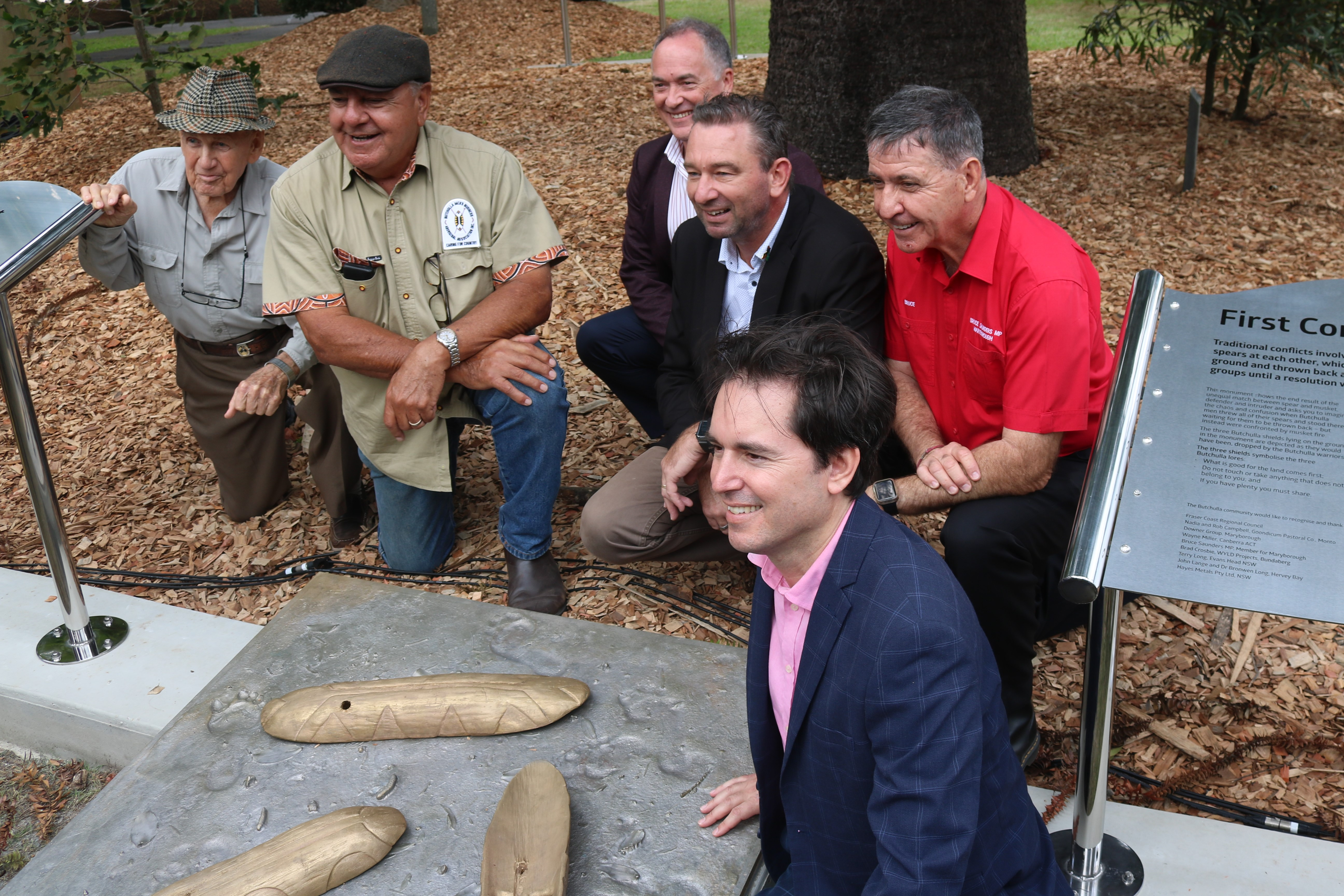
Official Dedication of Butchulla Warrior Memorial on 22 April 2023

The Butchulla War Memorial is near the bandstand. It is believed to be the first war memorial dedicated to Aboriginal warriors who died in the Frontier Wars. It was officially dedicated on Saturday 22 April 2023.

=== Fernery ===
The single story, double-domed fernery was constructed of besser block and concrete with green shade covers placed over a framework of metal mesh. It was a dominant landmark terminating Adelaide Street where it meets Sussex Street. The double-domed construction was demolished and the site where it once stood is now occupied by the Duncan Chapman statue.

=== The Lily Pond ===
The Lily Pond is located in the north-western corner of Queen's Park.

=== Gardens ===
Queen's Park has larger, mature plantings including the Cocos Palm Avenue (queen palms - Syagrus romanzoffiana) running north-south through the park and other trees, including banyan figs (Ficus benghalensis), poinciana trees (Delonix regia), celtis (Celtis sinensis) and weeping figs (Chinese elms or Hackberry trees - Ficus benjamina), running north-west to south-east through the park and, especially, the banyan fig, crow's ash (Flindersia australis), sausage tree (Kigelia pinnata) and bunya pine (Araucaria bidwillii), all of which are located in the south-east corner of Queen's Park close to the entrance gates.

Pathways and seating areas are located throughout Queen's Park.

== Heritage listing ==
Queen's Park was listed on the Queensland Heritage Register on 21 October 1992 having satisfied the following criteria.

The place is important in demonstrating the evolution or pattern of Queensland's history.

The Queensland botanic gardens network is important in demonstrating the introduction of multi-purpose scientific centres for the development of economic and ornamental botany for the benefit of the colony as a whole. Queen's Park, Maryborough, gazetted in 1873 as a Botanic Gardens is significant as the premier recreation and botanic retreat for the district. It demonstrates the importance of Maryborough as a major regional centre, demonstrating the desire to sustain a scientific, educational and recreational centre of international repute.

Founded on consistent ideological principles the Queensland botanic gardens demonstrate a clear and identifiable type of place. In terms of design, congruous hard and soft landscape features generate a sense of place that transfers to each a specific location. As a regional park, Queen's Park, Maryborough has maintained a position within a national and international network of botanic gardens of which the Royal Botanic Gardens, Kew, in London, was the originating hub.

The Bandstand in Queen's Park, erected in 1890 demonstrates the growth of Maryborough in the late nineteenth century.

War Memorials are important in demonstrating the pattern of Queensland's history as they are representative of a recurrent theme that involved most communities throughout the state. They provide evidence of an era of widespread Australian patriotism and nationalism, particularly during and following the First World War. The monuments manifest a unique documentary record and are demonstrative of popular taste in the inter-war period.

The place is important in demonstrating the principal characteristics of a particular class of cultural places.

Queen's Park, Maryborough, demonstrates the principal characteristics of a provincial botanic reserve, with a greater emphasis placed on the creating of a mixed collection of living exotic and native plants. The collection includes specimens rare in cultivation or of great maturity or both. Plantings dating from the nineteenth century include evidence of aesthetic, economic and experimental plants.

The bandstand is an unusual surviving example of an imported cast iron structure from William MacFarlane & Co, Saracen in Glasgow. The bandstand demonstrates the characteristics of nineteenth century cast iron bandstands. Unveiled in 1922, the memorial at Maryborough demonstrates the principal characteristics of a commemorative structure erected as an enduring record of a major historical event. This is achieved through the use of appropriate materials and design elements.

The place is important because of its aesthetic significance.

Queen's Park has individual items of particular aesthetic merit, including the Bandstand and Memorial Fountain (1890); the War Memorial and Memorial Gates (1922); the geodesic-domed Fernery, a dominant landmark, especially from the view along the streetscape where Adelaide Street meets Sussex Street; the Lily Pond; the avenues of trees, including banyan figs, poinciana trees, celtis and weeping figs, running north-west to south-east through Queen's Park; the Cocos Palm Avenue running north-south through the park, and mature plantings, especially the banyan fig, crow's ash, sausage tree and bunya pine, all of which are located in the south-east corner of Queen's Park. The structure (bandstand) is of aesthetic value as a picturesque addition to the park.

A major regional war memorial, it is also of aesthetic significance, as one of the most elaborately and unusually designed monuments in Queensland still surviving in its intact surrounds. It is also an uncommon example of statues which are representative of Italian models rather than Australian. As a large scale regional memorial it forms a dominant landmark within the town.

The place has a strong or special association with a particular community or cultural group for social, cultural or spiritual reasons.

As the first park established by the Maryborough City Council, Queen's Park demonstrates the commitment to provide recreational and educational facilities for the people of Maryborough and surrounding areas. Many important events have taken place in the gardens, and the place is generally held in high regard by the community and is a popular place for visitors to Maryborough. It is significant as a Maryborough landmark and for its visual amenity.

The place has social significance as a long used and popular reserve for public recreation and as an early example of the history of the state government vesting local authorities with the maintenance and control of public reserves. The park and garden feature a number of memorials and elements, commemorating well known local citizens, including Richard Bingham Sheridan. The memorial has a strong association with the community as evidence of the impact of a major historic event and also with Maryborough architect P.O.E. Hawkes as an unusual example of his work and local monumental masonry firm, F.W. Webb.

The place has a special association with the life or work of a particular person, group or organisation of importance in Queensland's history.

Queen's Park, Maryborough is significant for its special association with the pioneering work of Richard Bingham Sheridan, and Henry Palmer, the first Mayor of Maryborough. Queen's Park, Maryborough is significant for its association with Walter Hill. Every Queensland botanic garden from the nineteenth century network is associated with the ground breaking work of Hill. His powerful personality guided the establishment, location and development of this group of places. The expertise he contributed to the process was invaluable to the implementation of scientific principles in remote Queensland places. The bandstand has a special association with the life of Miss Janet Melville and her brother, Andrew Wedderburn Melville, prominent Maryborough citizens.
