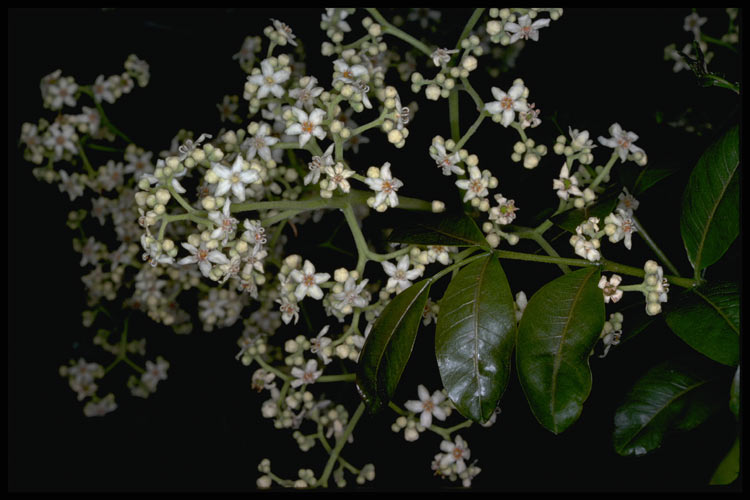

Scientific classification
- Kingdom: Plantae
- Clade: Tracheophytes
- Clade: Angiosperms
- Clade: Eudicots
- Clade: Rosids
- Order: Sapindales
- Family: Rutaceae
- Genus: Flindersia
- Species: F. australis

Binomial name
- Flindersia australis R.Br.

= Flindersia australis =

Crow's ash

Species of Australian tree

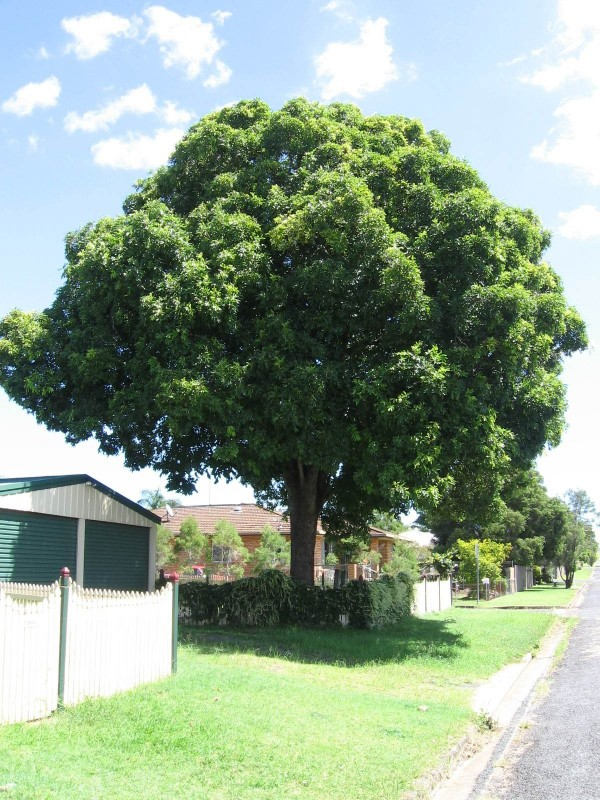
Habit in a suburban garden

Flindersia australis, commonly known as crow's ash, flindosy or Australian teak, is a species of tree that is endemic to north-eastern Australia. It has pinnate leaves with between five and thirteen egg-shaped to elliptical leaflets, white to cream-coloured flowers arranged in panicles on the ends of branchlets and followed by woody capsules studded with short, rough points and containing winged seeds.

== Description ==
Flindersia australis is a tree that typically grows to a height of 40 m (130 ft), larger trees usually having a buttressed trunk. The leaves are usually arranged alternately and are crowded near the ends of the branchlets. The leaves usually have between five and nine elliptical to egg-shaped leaflets that are 24–130 mm (0.94–5.12 in) long and 8–43 mm (0.31–1.69 in) wide, the side leaflets on a petiolule up to 3 mm (0.12 in) long and the end leaflet on a petiolule sessile or on a petiolule up to 32 mm (1.3 in) long.

The flowers are arranged in panicles 50–150 mm (2.0–5.9 in) long and usually include a few male-only flowers. The five sepals are about 2 mm (0.079 in) long and the five petals are white to cream-coloured, 6–7 mm (0.24–0.28 in) long and densely hairy on the back and part of the front. Flowering occurs from September to October and the fruit is a woody capsule 45–100 mm (1.8–3.9 in) long and studded with short, rough points.

The seeds are 34–50 mm (1.3–2.0 in) long and winged.

== Taxonomy ==
The genus Flindersia and F. australis were first formally described in 1814 by Robert Brown in Matthew Flinders' sea voyage journal A Voyage to Terra Australis, from specimens collected near Broad Sound in September 1802.

== Distribution and habitat ==
Crow's ash grows in rainforest and dry scrub from near Airlie Beach, inland as far as Carnarvon National Park and south to near Kempsey in New South Wales.

== Conservation status ==
Flindersia australis is classified as of "least concern" under the Queensland Government Nature Conservation Act 1992.

== Gallery ==
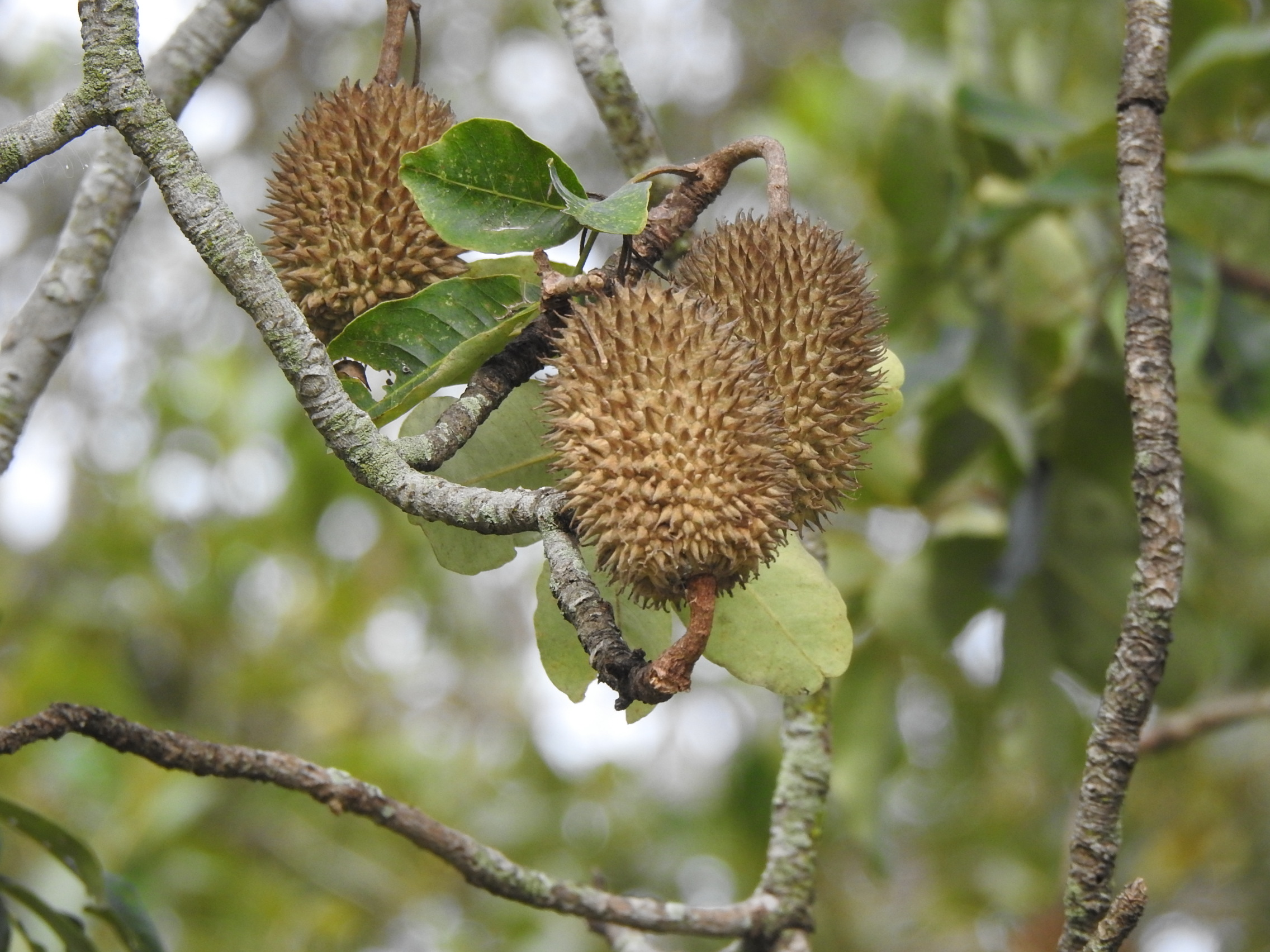
Fruit capsule on tree, unopened

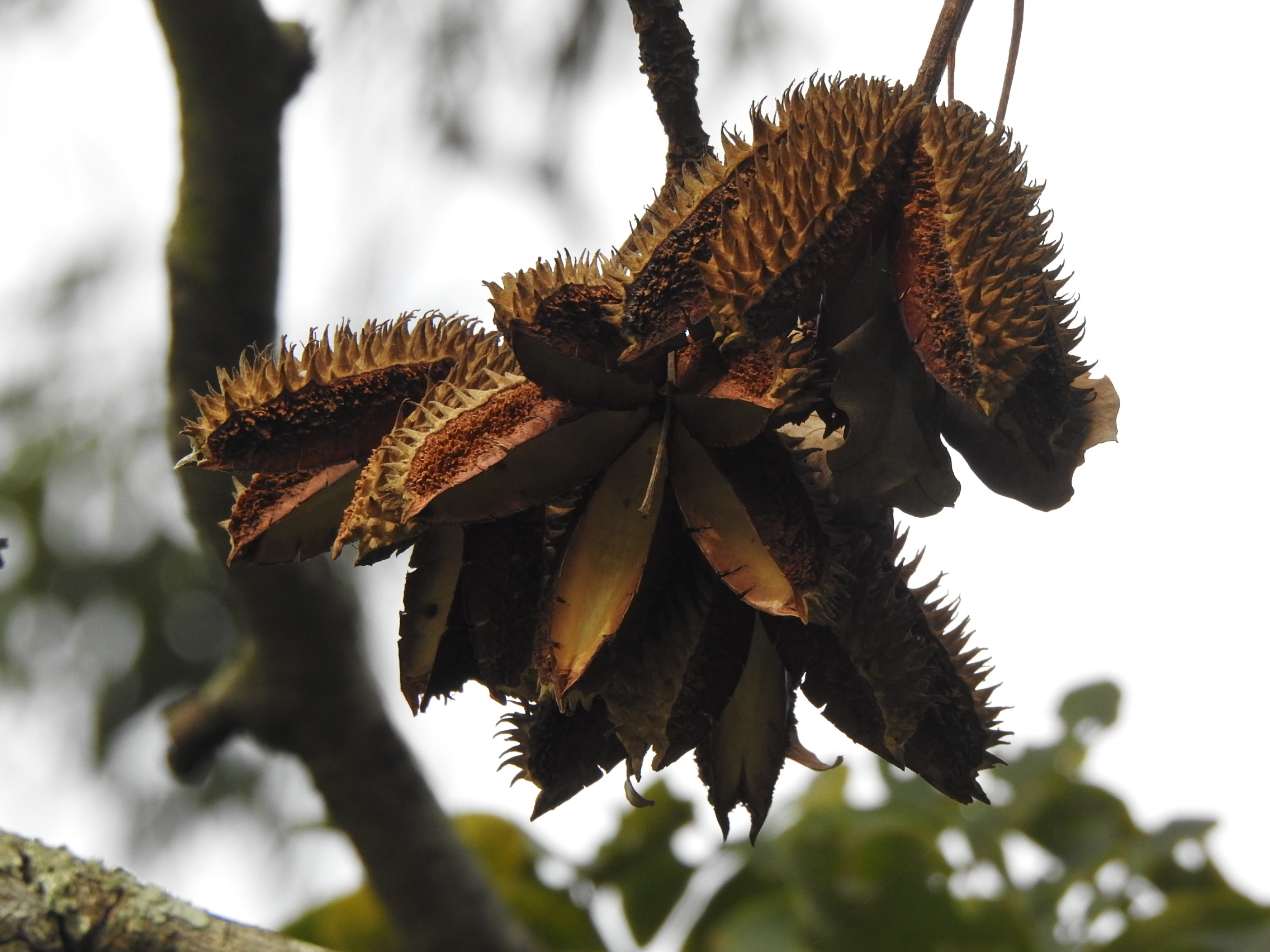
Fruit capsule on tree, open

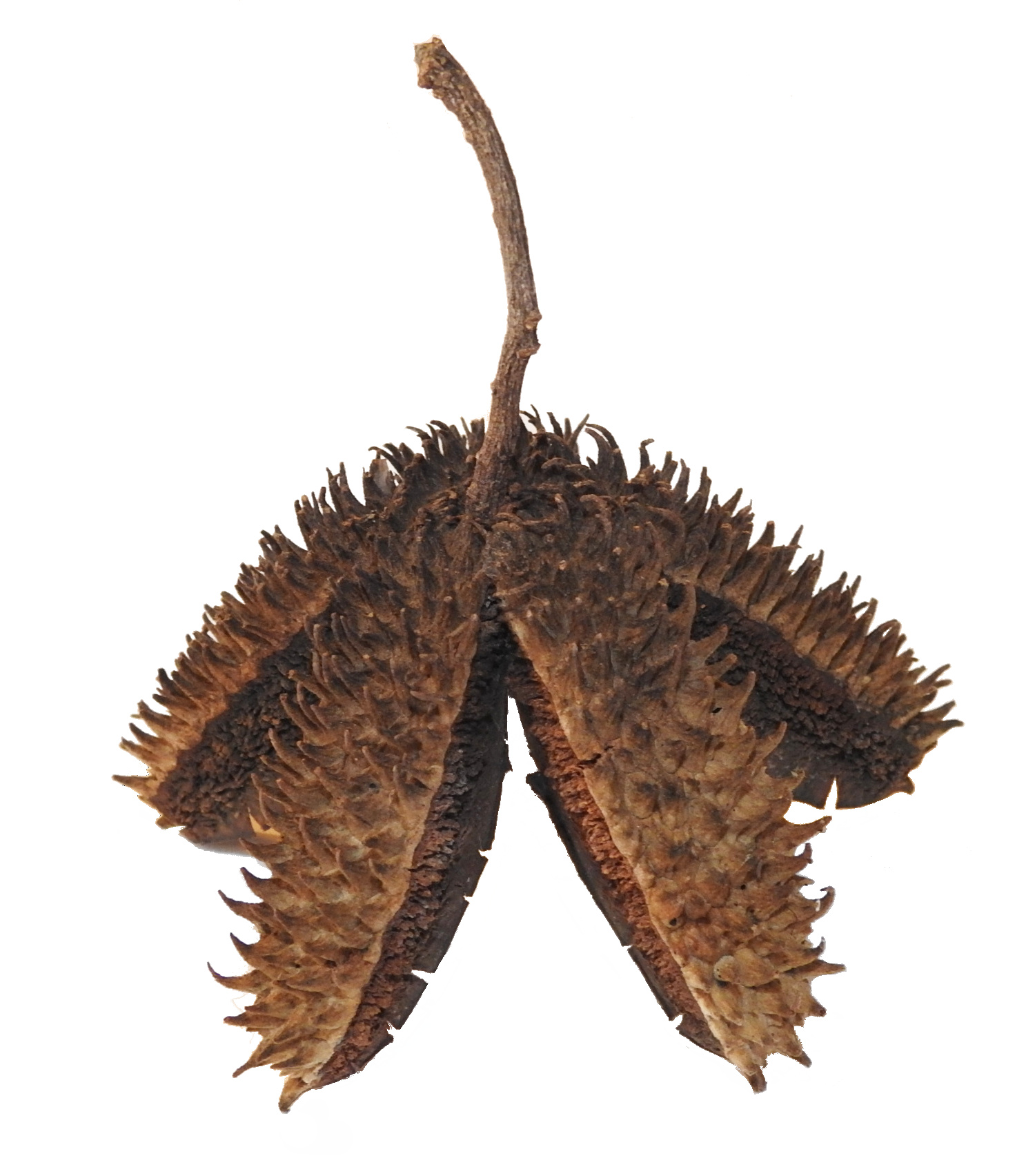
Seed pod outside

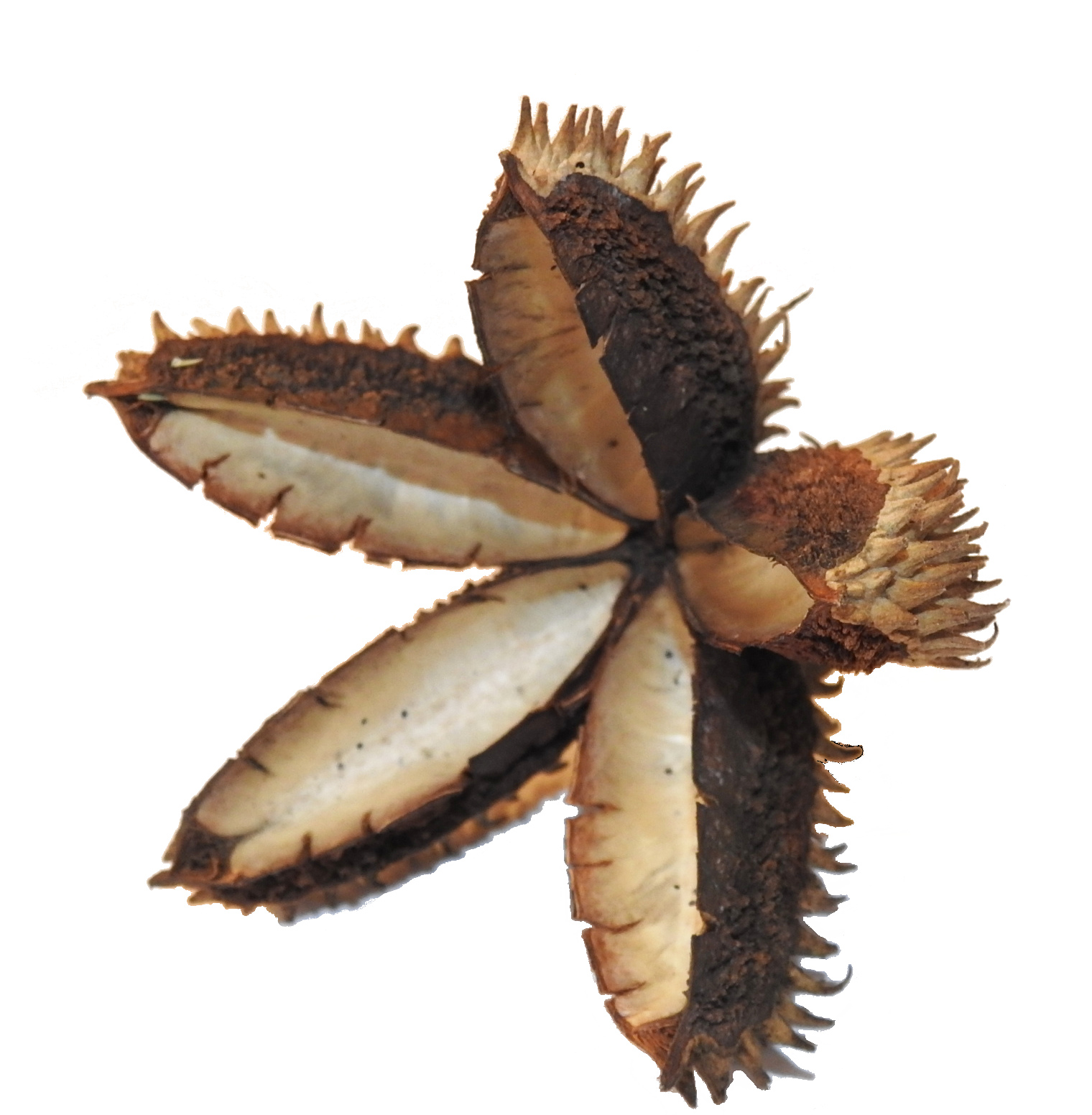
Seed pod inside
