= Gilbert Robert Beveridge =

Gilbert Robert Beveridge (1903—1958) was an architect in Queensland, Australia. Some of his works are now heritage-listed.

== Early life ==
Gilbert Robert Beveridge was born in Brisbane on 28 February 1903, the son of Robert Leake Beveridge and his wife Eliza Ann (née Brown). He studied at the Brisbane Central Technical College and was indentured to Brisbane architect Lange Powell. Beveridge received his Diploma of Architecture from the Architectural Association in London and was awarded the Archibald Dawnay scholarship in 1927.

== Career ==
Beveridge had a practice at Ascot from 1931–35 after which time he was employed first as an Assistant Architect then in 1938 as an Architect by the Queensland Works Department Architectural Branch. Beveridge's work in private practice included residential and small commercial projects.

Beveridge also prepared the plans for the brick Bulimba State School building which was one of many substantial two and three storey schools built during this time, providing tangible proof of the Government's commitment to remedy the unemployment situation.

== Later life ==
Gilbert Beveridge died on 21 July 1958 in Brisbane.

== Works ==
His works include:

- Bulimba State School
- Maryborough Government Offices Building
