= Maryborough Waterside Workers' Hall =

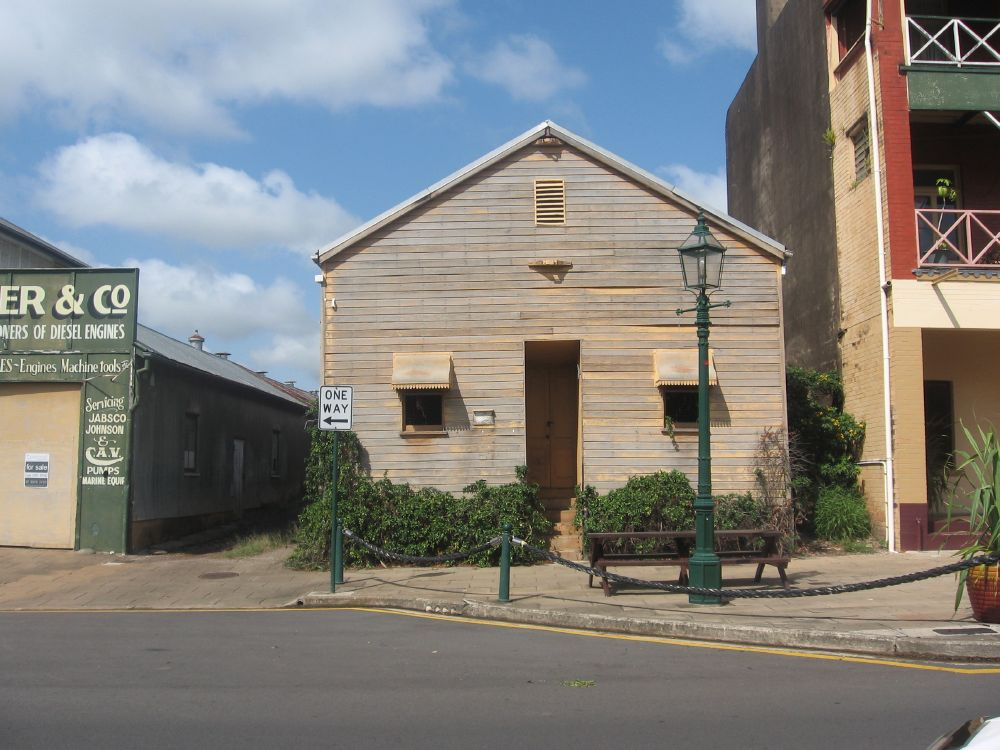
- Maryborough Waterside Workers' Hall, 2011

- Location within Queensland Location within Australia
- 25.5392°S 152.7058°E
- Location: 96 Wharf Street, Maryborough, Fraser Coast Region, Queensland, Australia

History
- Design period: 1914–1919 (World War I)
- Built: 1918

Queensland Heritage Register
- Official name: Maryborough Waterside Workers' Hall
- Type: state heritage (built)
- Designated: 9 July 1993
- Reference no.: 600717
- Significant period: c. 1918 (fabric); 1918–1963 (historical)

Maryborough Waterside Workers' Hall is a heritage-listed former trade union building at 96 Wharf Street, Maryborough, Fraser Coast Region, Queensland, Australia. It was built in 1918. It was added to the Queensland Heritage Register on 9 July 1993.

== History ==
The Waterside Workers' Hall Maryborough is a single storeyed timber building erected c. 1918 for the Maryborough branch of the Waterside Workers Federation.

The Port of Maryborough was regularly visited by a number of ships, most of which were associated with the carrying of timber. In 1850 the town of Maryborough was moved to its present site as that part of the Mary River was considered preferable for shipping. Gazetted a port in 1859, Maryborough continued to develop as the major port and centre servicing the Wide Bay region.

The Hall was used as a meeting place and pickup centre for the workers. It was funded by a levy of £2 struck on all members and was erected in Wharf Street, in proximity to the wharves and also to other buildings including the Bond Store, Customs House, and several hotels, also associated with the workings of the port. Prior to 1943, workers were selected according to the Bull System, that is workers for each shift were chosen by the shipping bosses. After that time, they were selected by the Union on a rotational basis. Both systems required the men to present themselves for work on notice of the arrival of a ship. In Maryborough some companies required the wharfies to meet at the wharves. Others, such as local firms Hyne and Son and Wilson Hart are recorded as using the Hall as a pickup centre, which, as a sheltered building with seating was preferred by the wharfies to the open sheds on the wharves.

With changes in communication and transportation and the development and increasing importance of Urangan as a deep water sugar port, the Port of Maryborough began to decline. By the 1950s Maryborough wharfies were increasingly employed at Urangan, but with Maryborough remaining the pickup place for local workers.

On 18 March 1963 the last work was performed by waterside workers at Maryborough. The Maryborough Branch and the Hall were, however, maintained, although all work performed by Maryborough workers was done at Urangan, Bundaberg, and Gladstone. In 1972, the register of waterside workers which was still maintained at Maryborough was closed and a register opened at Urangan. The Urangan Branch assumed control of the assets of the Maryborough Branch.

In the 1960s the back half of the hall was rented to the present owner for storage. The front section was also rented to both bands for rehearsal and to weightlifters as a training centre. In 1980, the building was purchased by the present owner, who operates a marine engineering business from an adjoining building. The hall is currently used for storage.

== Description ==
The Waterside Workers' Hall is a single-storeyed timber and iron building facing Wharf Street to the north, with a view of the Mary River to the northeast.

This long rectangular building has a corrugated iron gable roof, timber stumps and a single skin chamferboard street facade with recessed central entry and a sash window to either side. These windows have sheet metal hoods and the gable has a mounted flagpole. The single skin weatherboard east elevation has sash windows and borders a service lane. Other elevations are of corrugated iron with a lean-to structure at the rear containing a gantry for unloading equipment.

Internally, the central entry leading into the hall, has a room to either side with single skin tongue-and-groove partition walls, most of which is missing from the northwest room. The roof is unlined and the rear lean-to, which has a raised timber floor, was accessed via an opening which resembles a proscenium arch.

The Criterion Hotel borders the west boundary and a diesel workshop and a large boarding house is located to the east. The rear of the property is grassed.

== Heritage listing ==
Maryborough Waterside Workers' Hall was listed on the Queensland Heritage Register on 9 July 1993 having satisfied the following criteria.

The place is important in demonstrating the evolution or pattern of Queensland's history.

The Maryborough Waterside Workers' Hall, erected c. 1918, is important in demonstrating the pattern of the Queensland's history, in particular the development of Maryborough as a shipping port for the Wide Bay district and the development of Wharf Street to service that port area.

The place is important in demonstrating the principal characteristics of a particular class of cultural places.

It is important in demonstrating the principal characteristics of a worker's hall and meeting place.

The place is important because of its aesthetic significance.

It is important in exhibiting a range of aesthetic characteristics valued by the local community, in particular the unpretentious and elegant nature of the building's forms, its interaction with the surrounding buildings, and its contribution to the streetscape of Wharf Street and to the Maryborough townscape.

The place has a special association with the life or work of a particular person, group or organisation of importance in Queensland's history.

It has a special association with the Waterside Workers' Union in Maryborough.
