= Customs House, Maryborough =

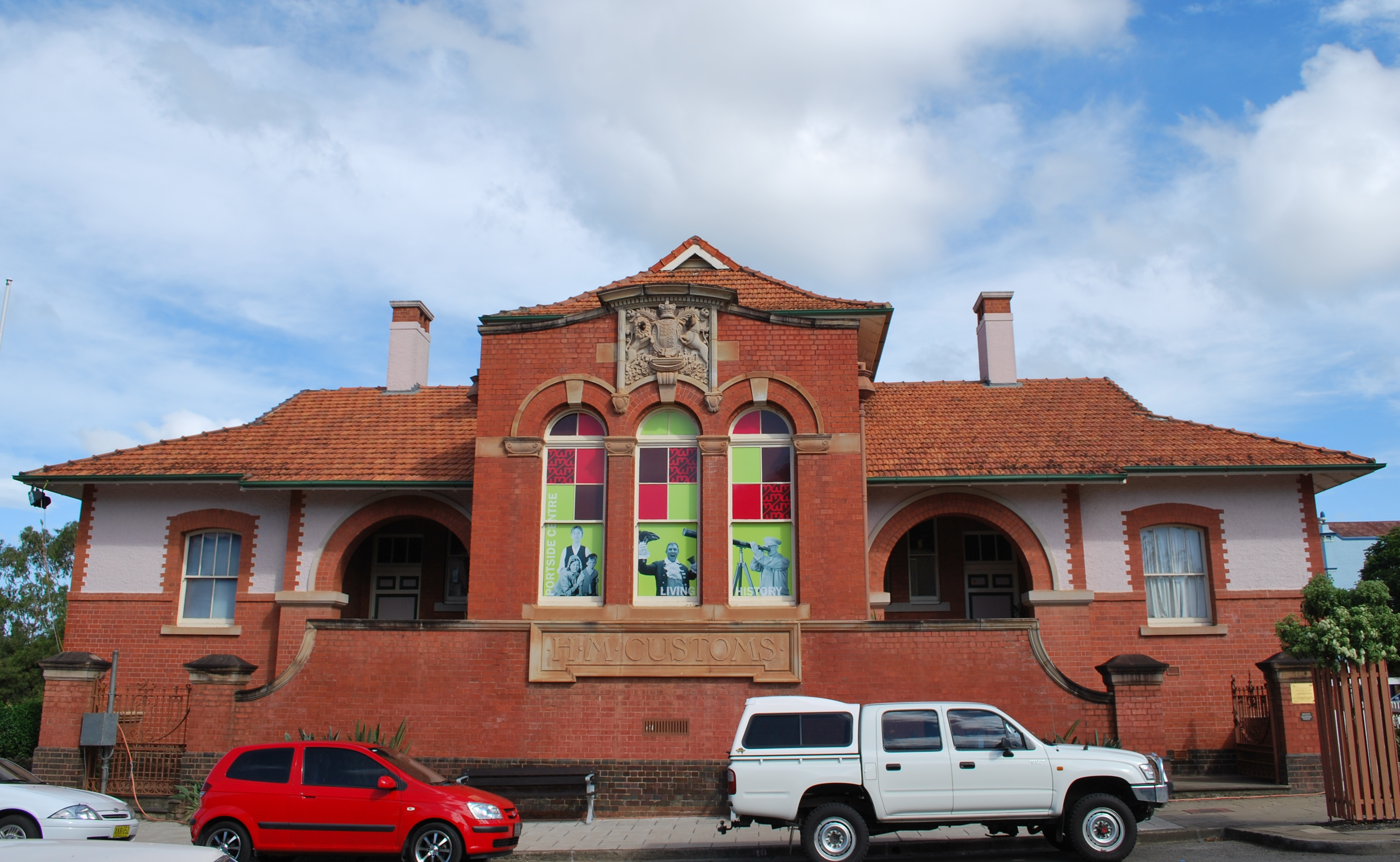
- Customs House, Maryborough, 2008

- Location within Queensland Location within Australia
- 25.5384°S 152.7055°E
- Location: Richmond Street, Maryborough, Fraser Coast Region, Queensland, Australia

History
- Design period: 1870s–1890s (late 19th century)
- Built: 1899

Site notes
- Architect: John Smith Murdoch

Queensland Heritage Register
- Official name: Customs House and Residence (former)
- Type: state heritage (built)
- Designated: 7 February 2005
- Reference no.: 600709
- Significant period: 1899 (fabric); 1890s–1990s (historical)
- Significant components: residential accommodation – staff housing, garage, customs house

The Maryborough Customs House is a heritage-listed former customs house at Richmond Street, Maryborough, Fraser Coast Region, Queensland, Australia. It was designed by John Smith Murdoch and built in 1899. It was added to the Queensland Heritage Register on 7 February 2005.

== History ==
The former Maryborough Customs House and associated residence was constructed in 1899 to the design of Queensland Department of Public Work's architect, John Smith Murdoch. The building replaced an earlier customs house and residence constructed in the 1860s.

The original township of Maryborough was situated, not in its current place, but on the north of the Mary River, after wharves were established there in 1847–8 providing transport for wool from sheep stations on the Burnett River. In 1850 Surveyor, Hugh Roland Labatt arrived in Maryborough with instructions to "examine the River Mary...to suggest ...the best site or sites for the laying out of the town, having regard to the convenience of shipping on one hand and internal communication on the other...also...point out the spots desirable as reserves for public building, church, quay and for places for public recreation." The site recommended by Labatt was not where the settlement was emerging but further east and from the early 1850s this is where the growing town developed.

With the separation of Queensland from the colony of New South Wales in 1859, Maryborough was declared a Port of Entry and a sub collector was appointed. As a port, the conditions of importing and exporting from Maryborough were subject to the control of the Queensland Customs Department. Taxation on goods entering and leaving the colony was an important source of revenue for the newly established Queensland Government and, accordingly, customs services were highly regarded and respected. Collectors and sub-collectors were appointed as towns along the coastline were declared Ports of Entry, and although most customs officers commenced their duties in humble or makeshift buildings, the importance of the service soon demanded customs houses of more prominence and grandeur.

Brinsley Sheridan, the sub-collector appointed to Maryborough, worked from a customs office established in what became the kitchen of an early Maryborough hotel, which was later known as the Criterion Hotel. In 1861 a purpose built customs house was constructed with funds granted by the government. Tenders were called for the building in early 1861 and the building was ready for occupation in March 1862. The site chosen was adjacent to the wharf area. The buildings erected at this time included a brick customs house facing the river and a timber residence adjoining the rear of the main building. In 1863 the Government Bond Store was constructed on the Customs House Reserve to store goods held on the Customs House site.

Through the 1860s and 1870s Maryborough grew rapidly, in response to the discovery of gold in Gympie to which Maryborough served as port and also with the introduction of the railway. The first rail systems were privately owned and linked the wharves with surrounding businesses. In 1881 the North Coast railway line was extended to Gympie.

By the 1890s, the 1861 customs house was deteriorating and this was more rapid after a flood in 1893. Soon after this, a decision was made to construct a new Customs House. A large new Brisbane customs house was constructed in 1889 and the high quality and substantial nature of this building inspired many of the customs houses built in the federation period, which included that at Maryborough, and others at Rockhampton, Townsville, Bundaberg and Mackay.

In January 1899, Alfred Barton Brady the colonial architect called for tenders for the construction of a customs house and residence in Maryborough. The tender of local contractors, Henry Neale and Son, was accepted with work to be completed within 12 months. The final cost of the two buildings was £5956 and they were constructed of locally made brick on concrete foundations with Marseilles roof tiles. The Customs House was single storeyed with a long room, offices, strong room and toilets. The residence was a two storeyed building with six bedrooms and wide verandahs allowing sweeping views of the river. Unlike the previous customs house this building was sited to face Richmond Street and the Court House gardens opposite which had been established with the construction of the new Court House in 1877.

The building has been attributed to the architect, John Smith Murdoch who was an architect in the Department of Public Works in Queensland, under the leadership of AB Brady. Murdoch emigrated to Melbourne in 1884 and by July 1885 took a positions with the Queensland Works Department under one of Brady's predecessors, John James Clark, but was retrenched within two years. He returned again to the Department to work on the Victoria Bridge project managed by the then Engineer for Bridges and Government Architect, AB Brady. Brady appointed Murdoch to the position of Draftsman and Inspector of Works in 1897 and to Second Assistant Architect in 1899. In July 1904 Murdoch transferred permanently to the Commonwealth Department of Homes Affairs, where he enjoyed a successful career becoming Director General of Works in 1927.

Murdoch, throughout his career, displayed a remarkable talent, designing innovative and well planned buildings of considerable architectural merit. A recent paper on the architecture of Murdoch, discusses his fusion of styles which meld the contemporary desire for an Australian federation architecture which was closely allied with the English Queen Anne style, with the imperial architectural style of Edwardian Baroque creating an individualistic and sensitive manifestation of two cultural phenomena of late nineteenth century in Australian society, namely nationalism and allegiance to the Crown. The principle elements of his style were picturesque asymmetrical massing; overscaled classical elements, including broken pediments, coursing, entablatures, columns; crenellation; Royal Arms motif and other sculptural elements. The paper asserts that examples of Murdoch's architecture have become "cultural and architectural icons, proudly displaying Royal Arms conveying authority, tradition and a link to the empire."

The Maryborough Customs House is a good example of Murdoch's architecture, integrating the familiarity and aesthetic comfort of the form of Arts and Crafts with the authority and tradition associated with Classical details and motifs. These stylistic elements are employed with an environmental consciousness which pervades the planning of both the customs house and the residence.

In 1901 the newly established Australian Federal Government assumed control of the Customs service throughout Australia. This resulted in a change of ownership of the Maryborough Custom House from state to federal government. In 1995 the Customs Service was removed from Maryborough and, although the buildings remain in Commonwealth ownership, they were used as the office of the Electoral Commission and the local Federal Member of Parliament, Warren Truss.

Since construction both the customs house and the residence have remained substantially intact with recent internal alterations allowing the buildings to be adaptively reused.

In 2001, the customs house became an interpretative centre within the Portside Centre heritage precinct.

== Description ==
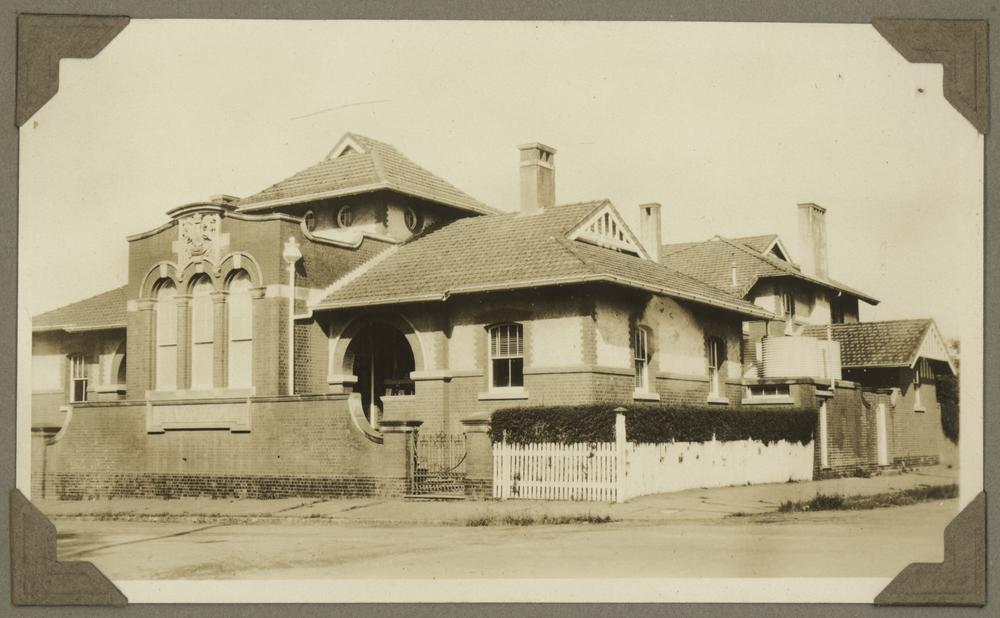
Customs House at Maryborough, 1930

The Customs House site contains two buildings, the former Customs House and the associated residence. These building are prominently located on the intersection of Wharf and Richmond Streets, Maryborough where several other important historical sites are located, including the Maryborough Court House, Customs House Hotel, former Bank of New South Wales and the nearby Queens Park.

The former Customs House is sited toward the north western end of the site and addresses Richmond Street facing the Court House on the opposite side of the street. The residence, adjacent to the south eastern side of the former Customs House is more inwardly focussed with principal entrance on the southern corner. A small timber framed garage is an early remnant on the site. The former Customs House and residence are constructed from red brick and concrete on a dark brick base, and share similar rough cast stucco detailing. The principal difference in the buildings is that the Customs House is symmetrically composed, more outwardly focused and has details appropriate to public buildings. The residence displays more characteristics of domestic architecture in its scale and detail.

The former Customs House is symmetrically arranged, and has a rectangular plan with a Dutch gabled, terracotta clad roof, punctuated centrally by a square planned projection with a separate Dutch gabled roof, giving external expression to the former long room over which it sits. This projection is lined on four sides with face brick surrounded oculi on rough cast stuccoed panels, with brick quoining at the corners of the projection. Flanking this tower element, to the south east and to the north west are rectangular planned chimney stacks, rendered with rough cast stucco.

The principal facade, addressing Richmond Street, is dominated by a central entrance projection which integrates the brick fence with the building. The projection features three round arched window openings, which rest on an integrating sill and signage panel, with Art Nouveau lettering "H.M. CUSTOMS". Above the central opening is a concrete relief panel of the Royal Arms. Openings in the fence on either side of the porch provide access to concrete stairs which lead to smaller open porches on either side of the entrance projection. Large round headed arched openings on the face of the facade give access to these porches. On the outer side of these openings are segmental arched window openings, surrounded with face brick quoining. Excluding the central entrance projection which is face brick, this and all other external walls are face brick to mid-height and then rendered with rough cast stucco with face brick quoining.

The side elevations of the former Customs House have two segmental arched window openings. The rear elevation has a centrally located awning supported on oversized and closely spaced curved brackets. Flanking this are a number of window and door openings.

Internally the former Customs House is arranged around a large central room, formerly the long room which is under the tower element. This square planned space is divided from four adjacent recesses by round arched openings. The recess to the north west houses an entrance vestibule to which access is provided from the porches off the principal facade. The recesses on the other three sides of the former long room, house an office to the south east, opposite the entrance vestibule, and transitional spaces to doors on the north west and south west leading to offices flanking the long room. Internally the building generally has timber boarded floors, plastered walls and timber boarded ceilings with central fretwork panels featuring intertwined lettering "VR", the royal cypher of Queen Victoria. Surviving in this building are several intact, though occasionally painted, fireplaces.

The residence is an asymmetrical two storeyed building, which shares the use of red face brick and rough cast stucco, on a dark brick base, found on the Customs House. It is an asymmetrically arranged building, with a complex roofline comprising many one and two storeyed hipped and gabled sections. A two storeyed verandah lines the north eastern side of the house. The verandah at the lower level is formed by a brick arcade of large round arched openings, and a timber battened balustrade. The residence has a large variety of window openings which contribute to its complex form, including several oculi, grouped lancet type windows with round arched heads and grouped square arched windows. Many of the windows in the house are glazed with pale glazed leadlight panels of regular geometric patterns.

The principal entrance to the residence is via a hipped roof porch which is in the recessed southern corner of the house. The terracotta clad awning of the porch is supported on small concrete Doric columns which rest on a brick plinth. The porch has a tessellated tile floor with a central panel of encaustic tiles. The porch provides access to a central entrance hall from which the stair hall and several other ground floor rooms are accessed. The entrance hall has a timber boarded dado panel, painted rendered walls, an elaborate dentilled timber cornice and a timber boarded ceiling.

A small seating recess is separated from the entrance hall with a round arched opening. A similar arched opening separates the dog legged timber stair. The stair hall is naturally lit with an oculus opening at the level of the first landing and three round arched openings at a higher level. The rooms on the upper level are accessed via a central hall leading from the principal stair to another smaller timber stair in the western corner of the building. Generally the interior of the upper floor contains timber boarded ceilings, plastered walls and timber boarded floors. Centrally placed in many of the internal rooms are decorative timber fretwork panels. Several fine fireplaces survive throughout the building.

== Heritage listing ==
The Maryborough Customs House was listed on the Queensland Heritage Register on 7 February 2005 having satisfied the following criteria.

The place is important in demonstrating the evolution or pattern of Queensland's history.

The former Maryborough Customs House and Residence, constructed in 1899, demonstrate the growth of the Port of Maryborough in the nineteenth century. The prominence and high quality of the design of the buildings provide evidence of the importance of the customs service in Queensland.

The place is important in demonstrating the principal characteristics of a particular class of cultural places.

This substantially intact site which includes a customs house and residence, as well as the Government Bond Store, demonstrates the principle characteristics of a late nineteenth century regional customs precinct, sited adjacent to former wharves. The buildings are characteristic examples of the high quality of design produced by the Public Works Department of Queensland in the late nineteenth and early twentieth centuries.

The place is important because of its aesthetic significance.

The Customs House and Residence are of considerable aesthetic and architectural merit as innovative and well composed public buildings on a prominent Maryborough site. The picturesque massing of the buildings and manipulated classical detailing and elements clearly demonstrate the characteristics of the architecture of John Smith Murdoch in his fusion of Arts and Crafts form with Edwardian Baroque detail.

The place is important in demonstrating a high degree of creative or technical achievement at a particular period.

The buildings demonstrate considerable creative innovation as very good Queensland examples of the late nineteenth Australian architectural influence of the English Arts and Craft movement.

The place has a special association with the life or work of a particular person, group or organisation of importance in Queensland's history.

The building has special associations with the fine Works Department architect, John Smith Murdoch who designed many small innovative public buildings during his employment with the state government before his transfer to the Commonwealth.
