= Customs House Hotel, Maryborough =

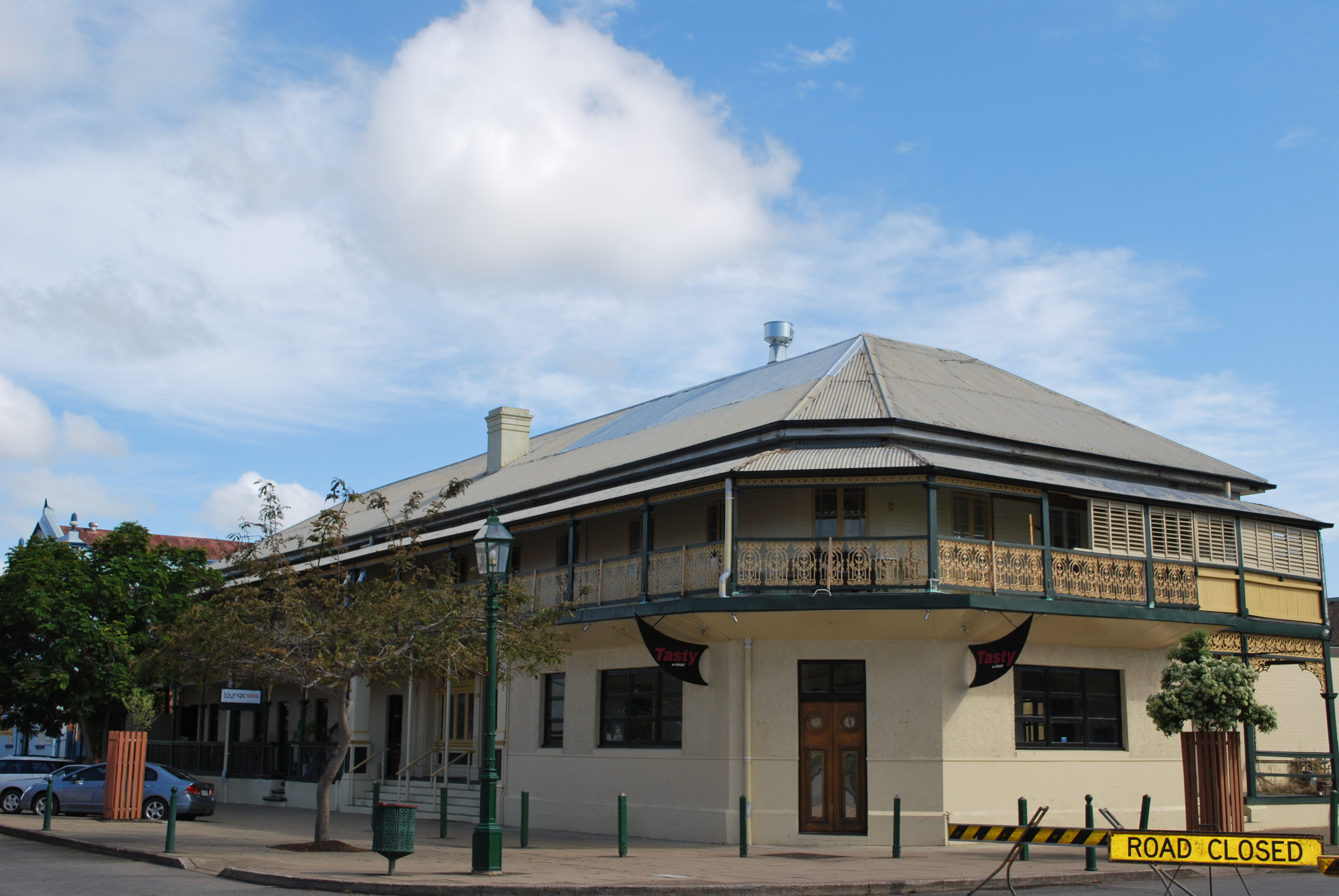
- Customs House Hotel, Maryborough, 2008

- Location within Queensland Location within Australia
- 25.5388°S 152.7052°E
- Location: 116 Wharf Street, Maryborough, Fraser Coast Region, Queensland, Australia

History
- Design period: 1840s–1860s (mid-19th century)
- Built: 1868
- Built for: George Gilbraith

Queensland Heritage Register
- Official name: Customs House Hotel
- Type: state heritage (built)
- Designated: 21 October 1992
- Reference no.: 600715
- Significant period: 1860s–1950s (fabric); 1868–ongoing (historical use)
- Significant components: furniture/fittings

Customs House Hotel is a heritage-listed hotel at 116 Wharf Street, Maryborough, Fraser Coast Region, Queensland, Australia. It was built in 1868. It was added to the Queensland Heritage Register on 21 October 1992.

It currently operates as a restaurant, cafe and function space.

== History ==
The Custom House Hotel is the oldest extant hotel in Maryborough, constructed in 1868 for George Galbraith.

The original township of Maryborough was situated, not in its current place, but on the north of the Mary River, after wharves were established in 1847–8, to provide transport for wool from sheep stations on the Burnett River. In 1852 the growing town was gradually transferred further north where ships were able to better navigate the river. Development followed and by March 1861, Maryborough became a municipality, the Borough of Maryborough.

With separation in 1859, Maryborough was declared a port and a customs official, or Sub-Collector, Mr Sheridan, was appointed and worked out of a small room where the Criterion Hotel now stands in Wharf Street. By 1861 the Customs House had been constructed on the corner of Richmond and Wharf Street and two years after this Bond Store was built alongside the Customs House to provide needed accommodation for the bonding of dutiable goods when ad valorem duties were introduced.

The land on which the Custom House Hotel was to be constructed was purchased as two lots in May 1852, one by Henry Palmer and the other by Hugh Roland Labatt. In February 1865, George Galbraith became part owner of the lot closest to the corner of Richmond and Wharf Streets, where the initial stage of the hotel was to be constructed. A two storeyed brick hotel was built in 1868 by Galbraith, it is unclear who designed the building. In 1870, Galbraith also bought the adjacent lot, and extended the hotel further along Wharf Street in that year. At this stage further accommodation was added to the first floor and a billiard room was added to the ground floor.

Galbraith retained the hotel until July 1871 when John Franklin acquired the Certificate of Title. Franklin had previously leased and operated another hotel in Maryborough, the Rose and Crown, at the corner of Lennox and Albert Streets. The Custom House Hotel has changed ownership many times, but continues to function as a hotel.

When built, the hotel's two storeyed verandah had cross-braced timber balustrading, but this was replaced with the present cast iron balustrade by 1894. By the 1950s the public bar area was extended on the truncated corner and two street elevations to the underside of the verandah, and a cantilevered awning was used to shade this area.

== Description ==
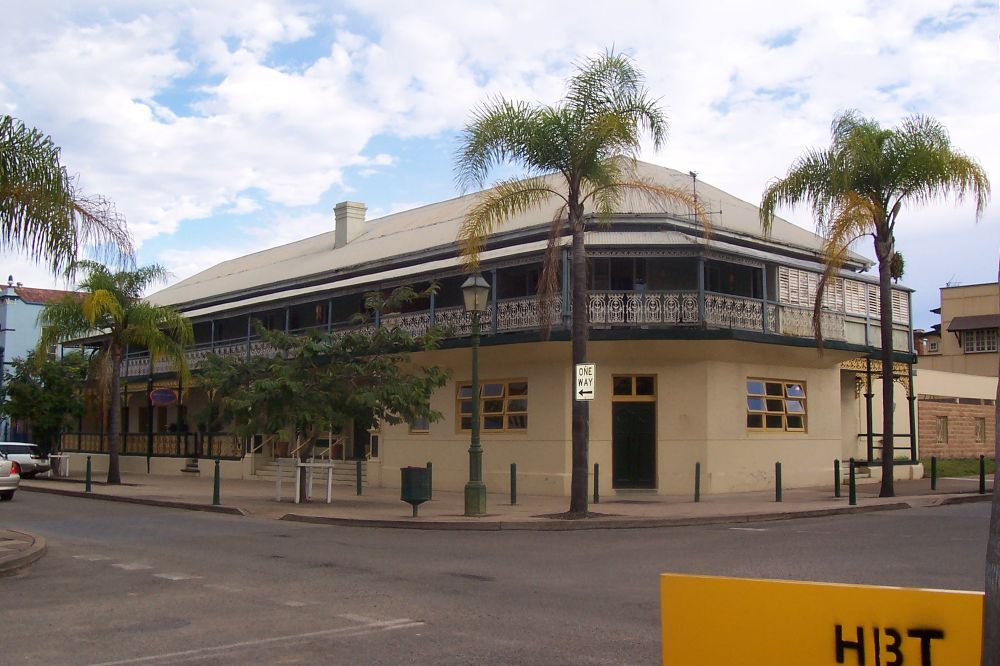
Customs House Hotel

The Custom House Hotel is a two storeyed brick building on the corner of Wharf and Richmond Streets, Maryborough. A two-storeyed residential wing extends from the rear of the hotel.

The building has a rectangular plan, extending further along the Wharf Street elevation, where a sympathetic later extension is found. The corner of the building is truncated and this is expressed on the hipped corrugated iron roof. Two-storeyed verandahs line the two principal facades of the building, though the corner of the first floor has been infilled. The verandahs, which are supported on square timber posts, feature a cast iron balustrade and frieze, though this has been replaced with different cast iron panels in some parts. Horizontal timber louvre blades to the second floor verandah survive on the Richmond Street elevation.

The public bar is entered via a door in the truncated corner of the building. This rendered concrete section has been infilled under the verandah, and has a cantilevered awning, and a series of nine hopper windows on each facade. The original wall of the building is evident within the public bar, though large holes have been cut away from it.

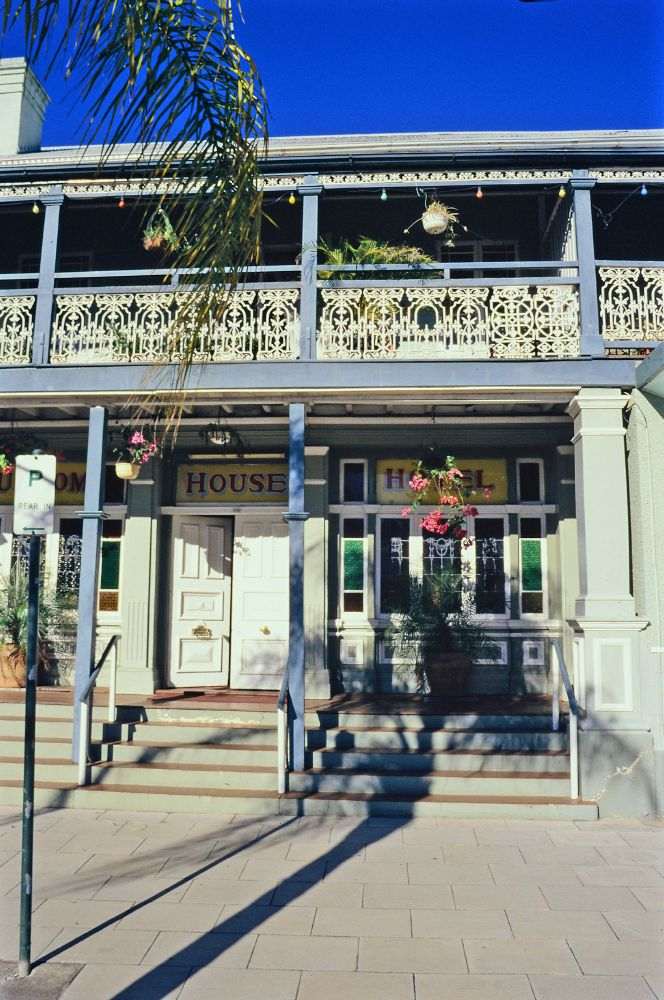
Entrance, 1997

Access to the dining and accommodation rooms is through a double panel door flanked by a tripartite window arrangement surrounded by particularly fine joinery and sidelights. Over the door and windows are large glazed panels with signage, "CUSTOM HOUSE HOTEL" written. The entrance and windows are separated by moulded pilasters. Further along Wharf Street are many window openings of two generations, those closest to the corner of the Richmond Street have replacement arctic glass hoppers, whilst the remaining are multipane vertical sashes with deep reveals.

The entrance hall, through the opening in Wharf Street, features a pressed metal ceiling and cornice, and remnants of an early wall paper strip above the dado rail. The unpainted timber stair has an open welled three-quarter turn stairway, with turned balusters and square newels surmounted by acorn finials. From the entrance hall is access to the former dining and billiard rooms which have been substantially altered with a suspended ceiling and recent brick archways, though a chimney piece survives.

The first floor remains substantially intact, with a central plaster walled corridor featuring timber and plaster archways, timber skirtings and a beaded board ceiling. The accommodation rooms, accessed from the corridor, remain substantially intact with early furniture and fittings, including corner sinks fitted into small timber boarded cabinets. Entrance to the front verandah from the rooms facing the front is via french doors featuring fine margin paned glazing. A wide rear verandah ensures that all rooms have access to external space.

== Heritage listing ==
Customs House Hotel was listed on the Queensland Heritage Register on 21 October 1992 having satisfied the following criteria.

The place is important in demonstrating the evolution or pattern of Queensland's history.

The Custom House Hotel demonstrates the pattern of growth in Maryborough, particularly near the docks, in and around Wharf Street.

The place is important in demonstrating the principal characteristics of a particular class of cultural places.

The hotel is an intact example of a Queensland country town hotel, characterised by its situation on a prominent corner with two storeyed post supported verandahs to the principal facades.

The place is important because of its aesthetic significance.

The Custom House Hotel is an integral element of the Wharf Street streetscape, and is of value for its aesthetic characteristics, including fine joinery, cast iron verandah friezes and glazing.

The place has a strong or special association with a particular community or cultural group for social, cultural or spiritual reasons.

As the oldest extant hotel in Maryborough, the Custom House Hotel is of value to the community as a long serving public building.
