= Government Bond Store, Maryborough =

Government Bond Store
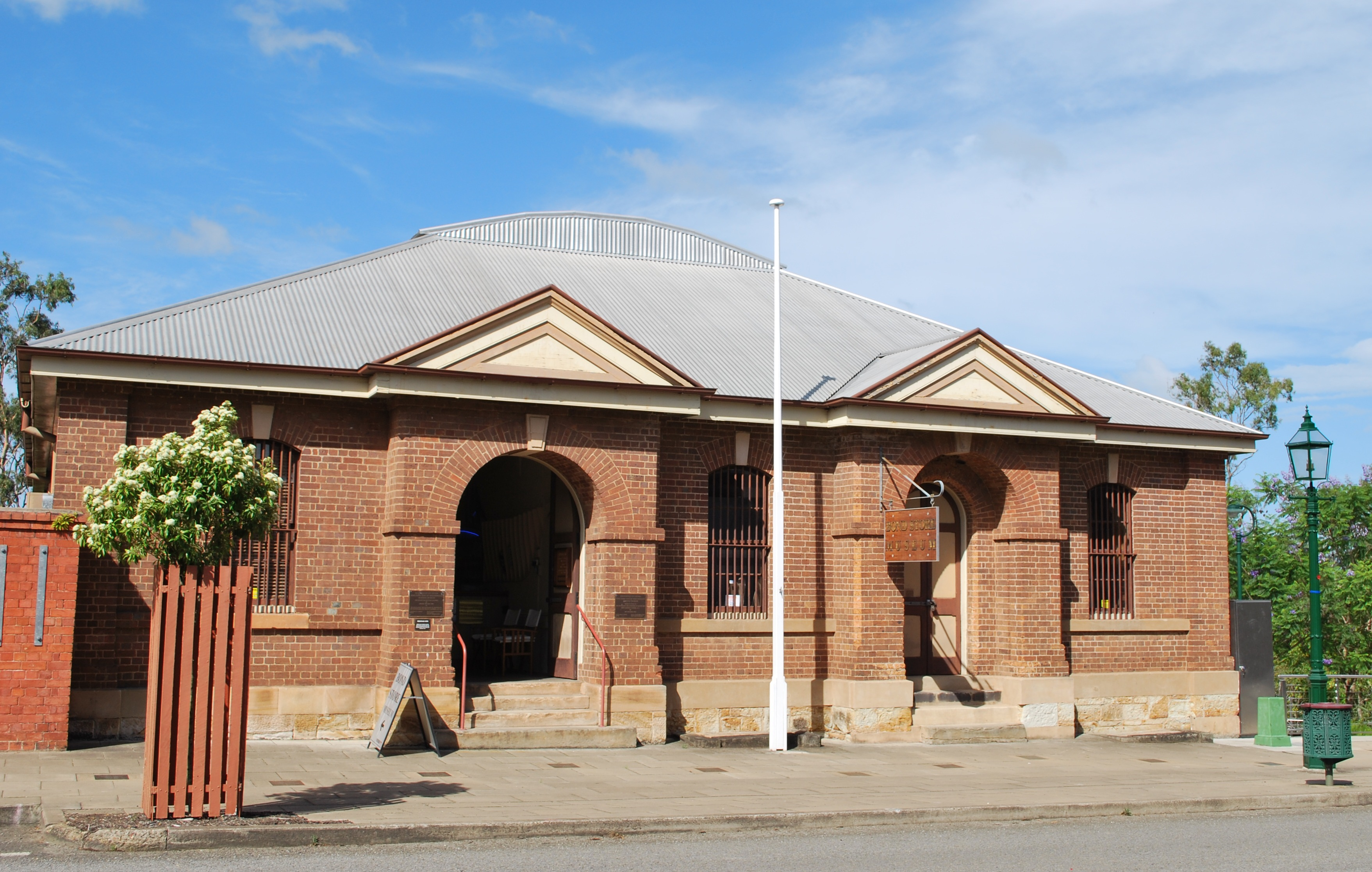
- Maryborough Bond Store Museum, 2008

- Location within Queensland Location within Australia
- 25.5386°S 152.7058°E
- Location: Wharf Street, Maryborough, Fraser Coast Region, Queensland, Australia

History
- Design period: 1840s–1860s (mid-19th century)
- Built: 1864–1883

Site notes
- Architect: Charles Tiffin

Queensland Heritage Register
- Official name: Government Bond Store (former)
- Type: state heritage (built)
- Designated: 7 February 2005
- Reference no.: 600716
- Significant period: 1860s–1880s (fabric); 1860s–? (historical)
- Builders: William Hope

Government Bond Store is a heritage-listed bond store at Wharf Street, Maryborough, Fraser Coast Region, Queensland, Australia. It was designed by Charles Tiffin and built from 1864 to 1883 by William Hope. It was added to the Queensland Heritage Register on 7 February 2005.

== History ==
The Government Bond Store in Maryborough, one of the earliest brick buildings in the town, was constructed in several stages from 1863. The building served for many years as a store for goods being processed by the adjacent Customs House.

The original township of Maryborough was situated, not in its current place, but on the north of the Mary River, after wharves were established there in 1847–8 providing transport for wool from sheep stations on the Burnett River. In 1850 Surveyor, Hugh Roland Labatt arrived in Maryborough with instructions to "examine the River Mary...to suggest ...the best site or sites for the laying out of the town, having regard to the convenience of shipping on one hand and internal communication on the other...also...point out the spots desirable as reserves for public building, church, quay and for places for public recreation." The site recommended by Labatt was not where the settlement was emerging but further east and from the early 1850s this is where the growing town developed.

With the separation of Queensland from the colony of New South Wales in 1859, Maryborough was declared a Port of Entry and a sub collector was appointed. As a port the conditions of importing and exporting from Maryborough were subject to the control of the Queensland Customs Department. Taxation on goods entering and leaving the colony was an important source of revenue for the newly established Queensland Government and, accordingly, customs services were highly regarded and respected. Collectors and sub-collectors were appointed as towns along the coastline were declared Ports of Entry, and although most customs officers commenced their duties in humble or makeshift buildings, the importance of the service demanded customs houses of more prominence and grandeur.

Bingham Sheridan, the sub-collector appointed to Maryborough, worked from a customs office established in what became the kitchen of an early Maryborough hotel, later known as the Criterion. In 1861 a purpose built customs house was constructed with funds granted by the government. Tenders were called for the building in early 1861 and the building was ready for occupation in March 1862. The site chosen was adjacent to the wharf area. The buildings erected at this time included a brick customs house facing the river and a timber residence adjoining the rear of the main building.

As trade increased through the Port of Maryborough, the Government made provision for £500 to be spent on the construction of a Government Bond Store in which to store goods held on the Customs House site. The contract was let in 1864 to a William Hope and a simple rectangular single storeyed brick building was constructed to the south east of the first Customs House. The design of this section of the current Bond Store has been attributed to Queensland's first Colonial Architect, Charles Tiffin.

Through the 1860s and 1870s Maryborough grew rapidly, in response to the discovery of Gold in Gympie to which Maryborough served as port and with the introduction of the railway. The first rail systems were privately owned and linked the wharves with surrounding businesses. In 1881 the North Coast railway line was extended from Maryborough to Gympie. Trade increased and extensions, costing £158 were planned to the Bond Store in 1870. A storey was added to the building and a two storeyed wing extended the building to Wharf Street where an entrance was created. When extended the Bond Store was transformed from a simple rectangular planned building to an L-shaped plan.

Further additions, costing £962 were made by 1883 when another two storeyed wing was added between the original 1863 wing and Wharf Street, transforming the L-shaped plan to a rectangular planned building. As well a gauging store was constructed for a cost of £317 by local contractor Henry Neale around the lower floor level of the rear walls of the Bond Store.

In 1901 the Customs Service was transferred to Federal government management and therefore the Customs House and ancillary buildings, including the Bond Store were transferred to federal ownership. Although the building has altered very little since the last major additions were made in 1883, its function as a bond store was lost when the Port of Maryborough was relocated to Urangan at Hervey Bay and customs services became redundant in Maryborough. The building has since been converted to a museum, interpreting the history of the former Port of Maryborough within the Portside Centre heritage precinct.

== Description ==
The former Government Bond Store is a two storeyed masonry building, with upper principal level aligned with Wharf Street and a partially subterranean basement level. The building is located within the Customs House reserve.

The building has a rectangular plan, principal entrances to the upper storey from Wharf Street, and a corrugated iron double hipped roof, which may have the remnants of an early roof lantern. The two entrances from Wharf Street are emphasised by projecting gabled roof section surmounting brick projections with round arched openings to the doorways. The two entrances are slightly different in detail and size, reflecting the development of the building. The former Bond Store is of brick and stone construction; the external walls are face brick and the foundations of the building are rock faced stone. The principal facade of the building, off Wharf Street, is dominated by the two entrances, which are separated and also flanked by segmental arched window openings.

Internally the building has two principal rooms on the upper level, one of which has a timber boarded ceiling, rendered walls and timber boarded floor. The other room, on the south eastern side of the building, has ceilings open to the various sections of roof framing, a timber boarded floor and painted and bagged brickwork walls. In the eastern corner of the former bond store is a straight open tread timber stair leading downwards to the basement level. Access is also provided to this lower level from Macalister Street through large double timber boarded and braced doors. This level has unpainted rubble stone walls forming several smaller spaces, with large arched openings connecting them. The floor is earth and several timber frames, presumable used as storage bases, line the floor.

== Heritage listing ==
The former Government Bond Storewas listed on the Queensland Heritage Register on 7 February 2005 having satisfied the following criteria.

The place is important in demonstrating the evolution or pattern of Queensland's history.

The former Government Bond Store in Maryborough is evidence of the early history of the town as an important Queensland port.

The place demonstrates rare, uncommon or endangered aspects of Queensland's cultural heritage.

The building is a rare surviving and characteristics example of a nineteenth-century bond store.

The place has potential to yield information that will contribute to an understanding of Queensland's history.

As one of the earliest brick buildings surviving in Maryborough, the building has the potential to yield evidence of early construction techniques.

The place is important in demonstrating the principal characteristics of a particular class of cultural places.

The building is a rare surviving and characteristics example of a nineteenth-century bond store.

The place is important because of its aesthetic significance.

The building has aesthetic significance as a mid nineteenth-century utilitarian brick building.

The place has a special association with the life or work of a particular person, group or organisation of importance in Queensland's history.

The Bond Store has special associations with the local community as one of the earliest surviving public buildings in Maryborough and now home to a local historical museum.
