= Maryborough Heritage Centre =

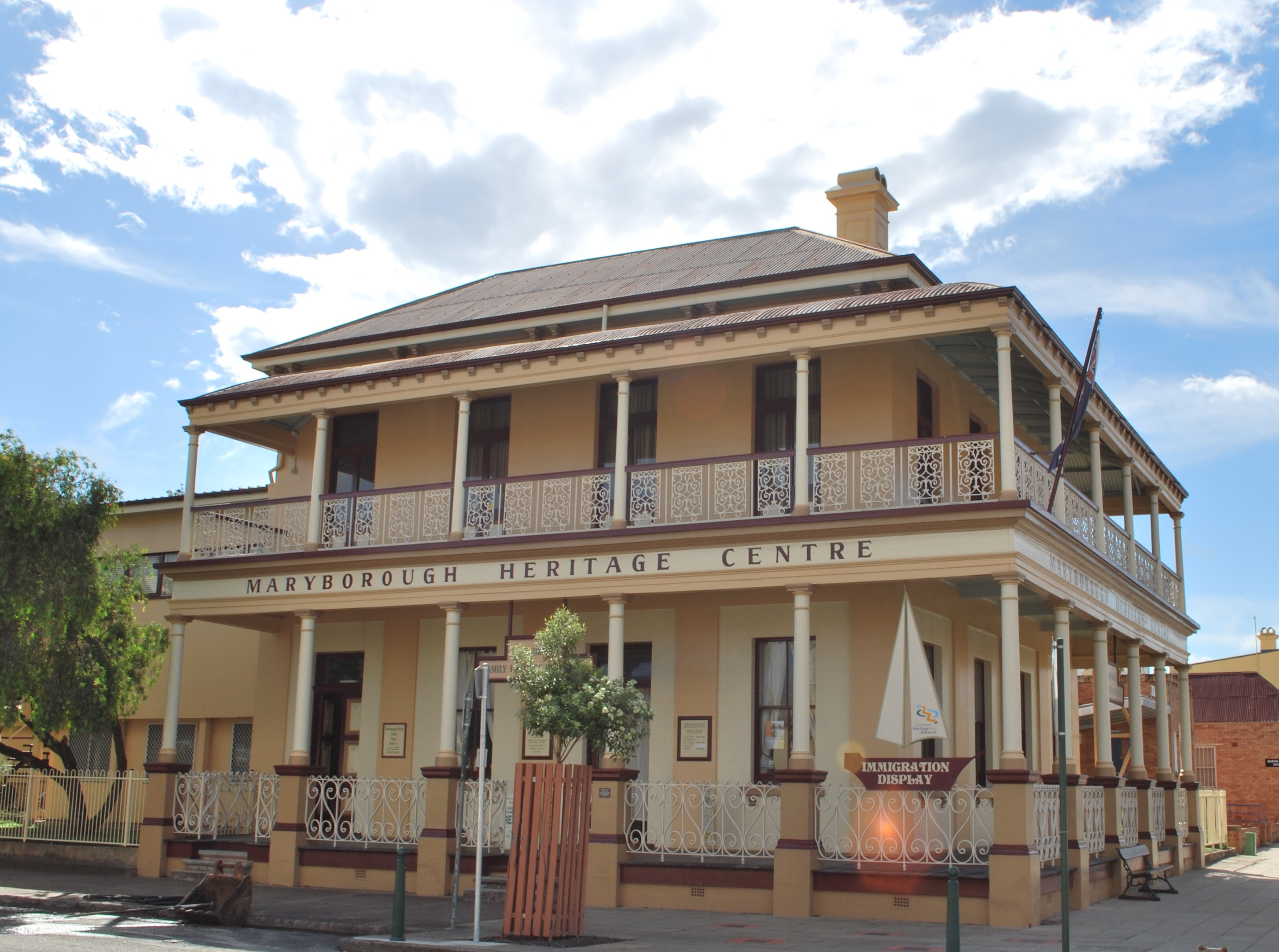
- Maryborough Heritage Centre

- Location within Queensland Location within Australia
- 25.5385°S 152.7047°E
- Location: 164 Richmond Street, Maryborough, Fraser Coast Region, Queensland, Australia

History
- Design period: 1870s–1890s (late 19th century)
- Built: 1877
- Built for: Bank of New South Wales

Site notes
- Architect(s): George Allen Mansfield & James Cowlishaw

Queensland Heritage Register
- Official name: Maryborough Heritage Centre, National Parks and Wildlife Service Headquarters, Post Master General's Department, Telecom Building
- Type: state heritage (built)
- Designated: 21 October 1992
- Reference no.: 600711
- Significant period: 1870s–1940s (fabric); 1877–c. 1956 (historical use as bank)
- Significant components: residential accommodation – manager's house/quarters, banking chamber

Maryborough Heritage Centre is a heritage-listed former bank building at 164 Richmond Street, Maryborough, Fraser Coast Region, Queensland, Australia. It was designed by George Allen Mansfield and James Cowlishaw and built in 1877 for the Bank of New South Wales. It is also known as National Parks and Wildlife Service Headquarters, Post Master General's Department, and Telecom Building. It was added to the Queensland Heritage Register on 21 October 1992.

== History ==
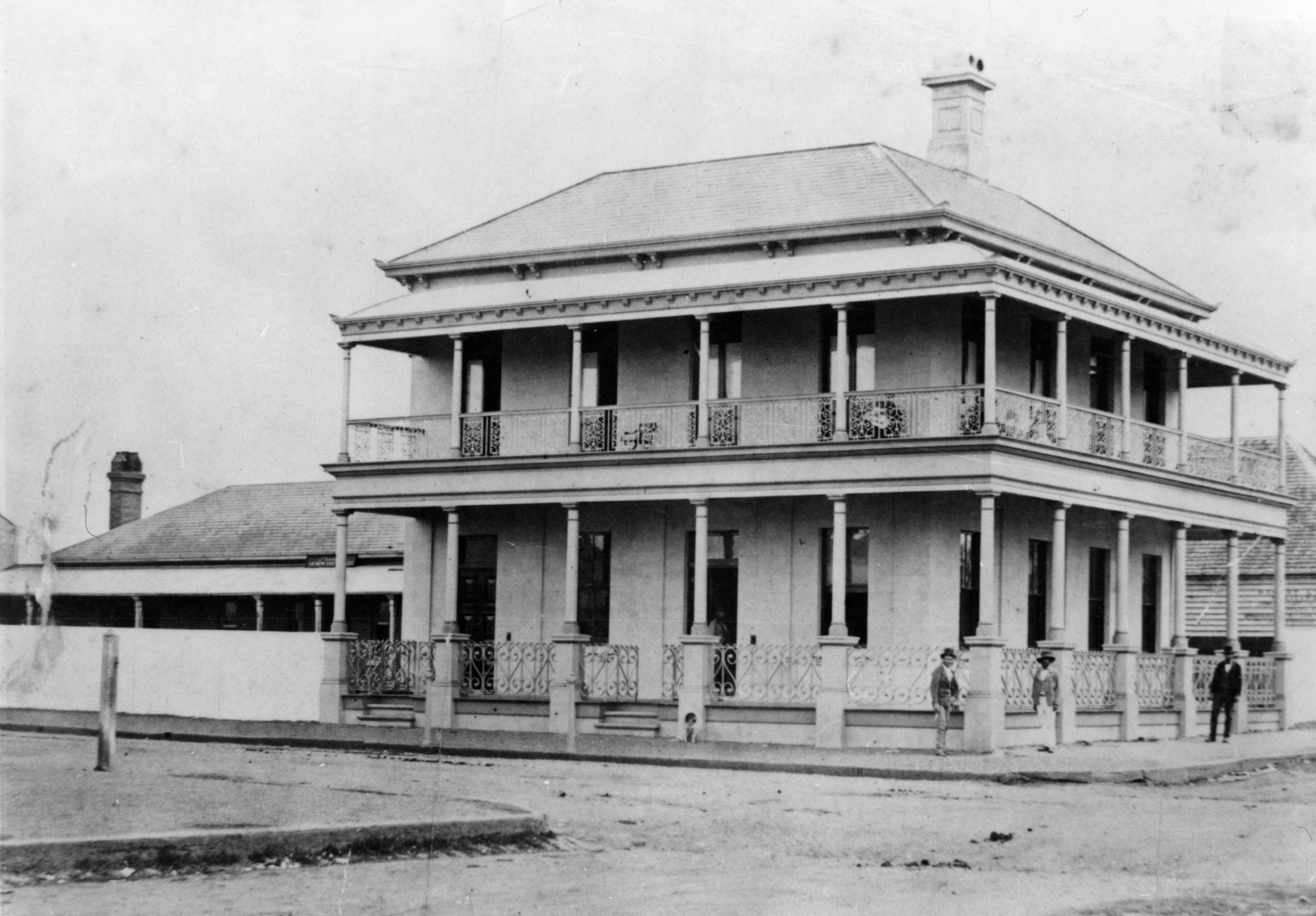
Bank of New South Wales in Maryborough, circa 1877

The Maryborough Heritage Centre was built in 1877 as the second purpose-built branch of the Bank of New South Wales in Maryborough possibly to the design of Sydney architect, George Mansfield in conjunction with Queensland architect, James Cowlishaw.

The original township of Maryborough was situated, not in its current place, but on the north of the Mary River, after wharves were established in 1847–1848 providing transport for wool from sheep stations on the Burnett River. In 1850, Surveyor, Hugh Roland Labatt arrived in Maryborough with instructions to "examine the River Mary...to suggest ...the best site or sites for the laying out of the town, having regard to the convenience of shipping on one hand and internal communication on the other...also...point out the spots desirable as reserves for public building, church, quay and for places for public recreation." The site recommended by Labatt was not where settlement was established but further east and from the early 1850s this is where the growing town developed.

With the development of Maryborough, banking was introduced and during the 1860s and 1870s when Maryborough flourished as the result of the discovery of gold in Gympie, many banking institutes established purpose-built premises from which they conducted business. Following close on the first discoveries of gold in 1867, the Bank of New South Wales established a branch in a portion of the Customs House Hotel at the corner of Wharf and Richmond Streets on 8 September 1868.

The Bank of New South Wales remained in this temporary accommodation during the construction of their first purpose-built branch being a single storeyed building another of the corners of Richmond and Wharf Streets. This building was designed by Joseph Backhouse, the brother of better known architect, Benjamin Backhouse.

As Maryborough expanded rapidly in the late 1860s and 1870s, a new, larger and more impressive branch of the Bank of New South Wales was planned in 1877. Tenders were called for this two storeyed rendered brick building on 26 January 1877 by bank manager, George Ranken. This suggests that the bank may have been designed by a southern architect. Other Banks of New South Wales constructed at this time include the Townsville Branch designed by James Cowlishaw (1883); and the South Brisbane branch, designed by Benjamin Backhouse and supervised by Alexander Brown Wilson (1884–1885). Many Queensland branches of the Bank of New South Wales were designed from the 1860s by Sydney architect, George Allan Mansfield who continued to design banks until early in the twentieth century. It is thought that the bank, which has a plan standard to many Banks of New South Wales may have been designed by Mansfield and supervised by James Cowlishaw.

Over time additions have been made to the rear of the building. A new Bank of New South Wales was erected on the corner of Kent and Bazaar Streets in 1956 meaning that the 1877 building was redundant and was subsequently sold to the Commonwealth of Australia, when the Post Master General's Department moved into the building. By 1981 the Queensland Government acquired the property and the National Parks and Wildlife Service used the building as their regional office. In 1995 the building was acquired by Maryborough City Council who have, again, renovated the building for use as a local heritage research centre.

In 2015, the lower floor of the building is occupied by the Maryborough Family Heritage Institute and the upper floor is occupied by the Maryborough District Family History Society.

== Description ==
The Maryborough Heritage Centre is a two storeyed rendered brick building prominently located on the corner of Richmond and Wharf Streets, Maryborough. This intersection houses four important historical sites of which the Heritage Centre forms an integral part.

The building is of loadbearing construction and has a rectangular plan and a hipped roof clad with corrugated iron. The building is surrounded on three sides by a double-storeyed verandah, with hipped curved awnings supported on cast iron columns on the first floor. A wide fascia board at the first floor level of the verandah, has signage, "Maryborough Heritage Centre". Joining the columns on the first floor are balustrade panels of decorative cast iron. Surmounting the columns on the first floor is a dentilled entablature, being the fascia of the awning. The ground floor of the verandah is lined with cast iron columns on rendered masonry plinths between which a wrought iron balustrade runs, also on a rendered masonry plinth.

The building has principal facades to both Richmond and Wharf Streets. The faces of the building are divided into vertical bays by shallow pilasters between which there are square headed arched window openings. The principal entrances to the building are through two timber framed doorways on the Richmond Street elevation. The openings on the ground floor align with similarly proportioned openings on the first floor, fitted with double half-glazed French doors.

Internally the building is arranged from a narrow hallway accessed from one of the principal entrances at the south-western end of the Richmond Street elevation, in which a timber stair runs to the first floor. The interior is generally timber boarded floors and plaster walls and ceilings. In the original banking chamber in the eastern corner of the building, which has its own entrance centrally located on the Richmond Street elevation and features elaborate plaster cornice and ceiling rose. Many rooms inside the former bank have pressed metal ceilings. On the first floor the ceilings are generally timber-boarded.

At the rear of the building are rendered masonry extensions, which have been added over time and are not always aligned with the original building, as is evidenced by a small set of internal stairs required to access the rear of the first floor. The extensions are both one- and two-storeyed. A timber open tread, quarter turn stair is located externally on the north western facade.

== Heritage listing ==
Maryborough Heritage Centre was listed on the Queensland Heritage Register on 21 October 1992 having satisfied the following criteria.

The place is important in demonstrating the evolution or pattern of Queensland's history.

The Maryborough Heritage Centre is a former Bank of New South Wales constructed in 1877 when the town was experiencing rapid expansion as a result of the nearby Gympie goldfields for which it was a port and demonstrates the growth of the town during this period. The building is part of an important area, formerly the financial and judicial heart of Maryborough adjacent to the early port facilities.

The place is important in demonstrating the principal characteristics of a particular class of cultural places.

The building is a good example of a two storeyed masonry nineteenth century bank, with elaborate banking chamber on the ground floor and residence above.

The place is important because of its aesthetic significance.

The building is a well composed and prominent landmark in Maryborough and has aesthetic significance.

The place has a strong or special association with a particular community or cultural group for social, cultural or spiritual reasons.

The Maryborough Heritage Centre is important for its use as a public building for about 120 years. Although the functions have changed over the years, the building has retained an important public role and is now the focus of historical research of the area.
