= Criterion Hotel, Maryborough =

Criterion Hotel
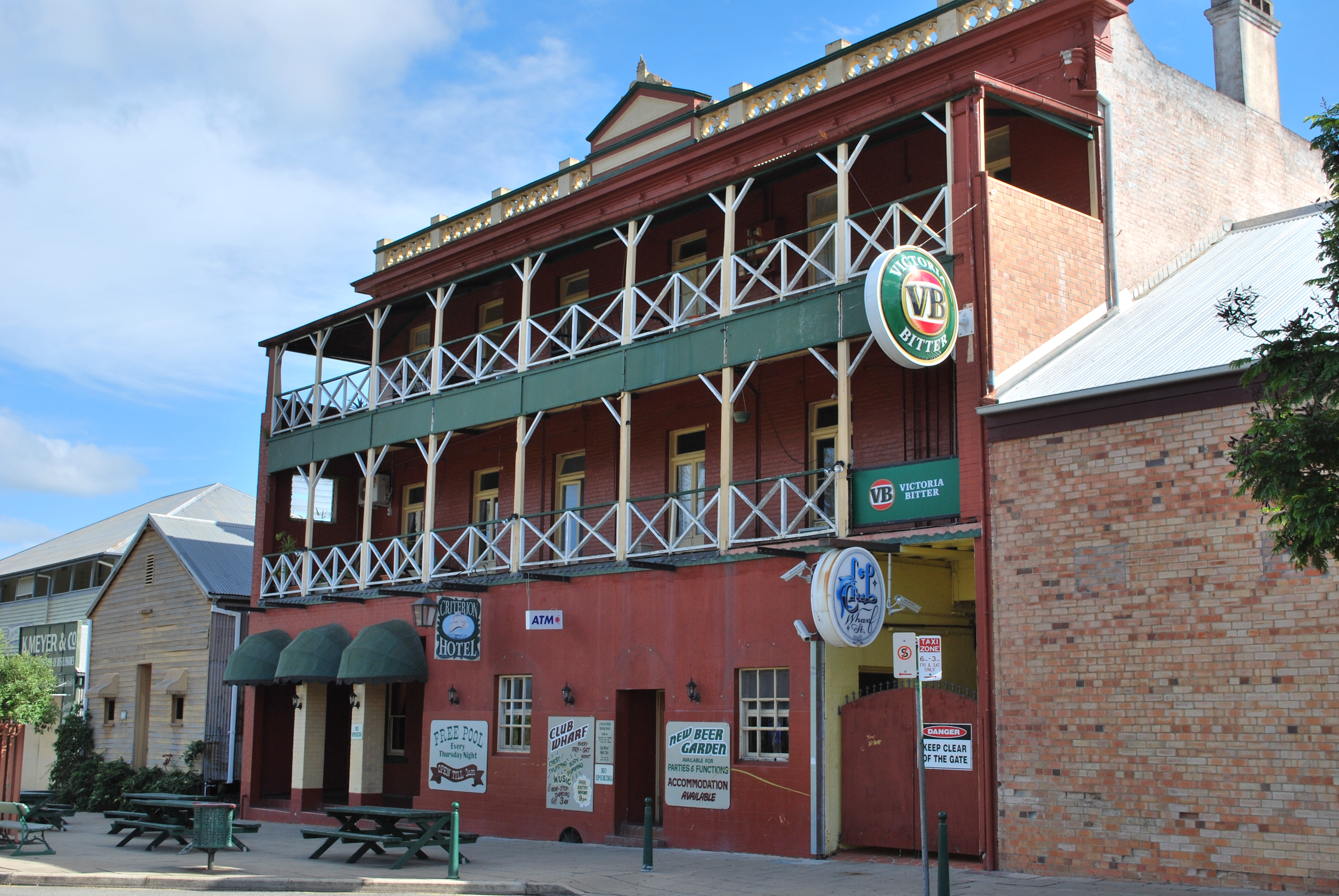
- Criterion Hotel, Maryborough, 2008

- Location within Queensland Location within Australia
- 25.5392°S 152.7057°E
- Location: 98 Wharf Street, Maryborough, Fraser Coast Region, Queensland, Australia

History
- Design period: 1870s–1890s (late 19th century)
- Built: 1878–1883

Site notes
- Architect: James Robertson

Queensland Heritage Register
- Official name: Criterion Hotel, Melbourne Hotel, Riverview Hotel
- Type: state heritage (built)
- Designated: 21 October 1992
- Reference no.: 600719
- Significant period: 1870s, 1880s (fabric); 1878–ongoing (historical use)
- Builders: Cooper Brothers

Criterion Hotel is a heritage-listed hotel at 98 Wharf Street, Maryborough, Fraser Coast Region, Queensland, Australia. It was designed by James Robertson and built from 1878 to 1883 by the Cooper Brothers. It is also known as Melbourne Hotel and Riverview Hotel. It was added to the Queensland Heritage Register on 21 October 1992.

== History ==
The Criterion Hotel is one of only two three storeyed brick buildings in Maryborough, erected in two stages from 1878 to 1883 for the owner Neil Blue, to a design of local architect, James Robertson.

The original township of Maryborough was situated, not in its current place, but on the north of the Mary River, after wharves were established in 1847–1848, to provide transport for wool from sheep stations on the Burnett River. In 1852 the growing town was gradually transferred to the south of the river which was considered preferable for shipping. Development followed and by March 1861, Maryborough was declared a municipality, the Borough of Maryborough. The area in and around Wharf Street developed as a result of the wharves, and with the construction of the Customs House 1861 and Bonded Store in 1863.

The land on which the Criterion Hotel, first known as the Melbourne Hotel, was later built was first acquired by ET Aldridge in May 1852 by a Deed of Grant. An earlier Melbourne Hotel was constructed on the site by 1868, which was a timber building whose proprietor was TN Milner. Neil Blue acquired the hotel in October 1877, and on 22 September 1878, the timber building was burnt down and another hotel was planned by him.

Neil Blue was born in Campbelltown, Scotland in 1845, and arrived in Maryborough in 1870 where he was involved with the steam coastal service. He married Sarah Gregory, daughter of local pioneers and the two remained as proprietors of the Melbourne Hotel until their deaths.

Blue commissioned a local architect, James Robertson, to design a replacement for the Melbourne Hotel, and tenders were called for this project on 30 November 1878. At this time two storeys were constructed using local builders, the Cooper Brothers and Henry Taylor for timberwork. The same contractors were used in 1883 when the second storey was added, though it is unclear whether this was originally planned by Robertson.

The Blues retained the hotel until about 1901, when Mr WE Boyce is listed as the proprietor. By 1916 the name of the hotel changed to the Riverview Hotel and Mr JR Ryan is the proprietor listed. The hotel then changes hands to Mr PJ Joyce and Mrs LM Joyce until 1939. By 1942 the name has changed to the Criterion Hotel with Mrs Mary Gummow as proprietor.

The building has experienced many changes including the replacement of a fine cast iron balustrade with a course timber cross braced alternative and the infilling of sections of the ground floor verandah space.

== Description ==
The Criterion Hotel is a three storeyed painted brick building, facing the Mary River on Wharf Street. A hipped corrugated iron roof is concealed by a parapet featuring a linked-circular balustrade, and centrally located moulded pediment.

The building has verandahs to the first and second floors and is infilled under this on the ground floor. The verandahs have simple recently constructed timber posts and cross-braced balustrading,

The ground floor openings have been substantially altered with the addition of the tiled and rendered brick infill work, though some survive intact. Half glazed french doors with operable transom windows give access to the verandah from the upper floors.

Internally the ground floor of the building is much altered although many original elements survive. Entrance is gained from two doors, one, in the infilled section, leading to the public bar and the other, to the accommodation section and dining room. Where intact, the ground floor is generally of plaster walls and ceiling with modest cornices and skirtings throughout. A large moulded archway in the entrance corridors separates the dog legged timber stair from the hall. The stair, which has turned newels and square balusters, is naturally lit by a multi-paned arched window, at the first half landing.

The upper floors retain the original planform, of centrally located corridors running parallel to the verandah, off which accommodation rooms are accessed both to the verandah side and to the rear of the building. The rooms feature four panel doors, with large transom windows above, some of which are not glazed but covered with punched metal sheeting. The verandahs are enclosed on the transverse ends with louvred windows and sheeting, and the timber floors have been extended, increasing the width of the verandah.

== Heritage listing ==
Criterion Hotel was listed on the Queensland Heritage Register on 21 October 1992 having satisfied the following criteria.

The place is important in demonstrating the evolution or pattern of Queensland's history.

The Criterion Hotel is important in demonstrating the pattern of growth in Maryborough, particularly the evolution of the Wharf Street dock area.

The place is important because of its aesthetic significance.

The Criterion Hotel is an important element of the Wharf Street streetscape, which is an intact area crucial to the understanding of the development of the port city of Maryborough.

The place has a strong or special association with a particular community or cultural group for social, cultural or spiritual reasons.

The hotel has been operating since 1878 and is important to the local community.
