= Port of Maryborough =

- Interactive map of Port of Maryborough
- Location in Australia

Location
- Country: Australia
- Location: Maryborough
- Coordinates: 25°32′S 152°46′E
- UN/LOCODE: AUMBH

Details
- Opened: 1859
- Owned by: North Queensland Bulk Ports
- Type of harbour: Natural

Statistics
- Website www.nqbp.com.au

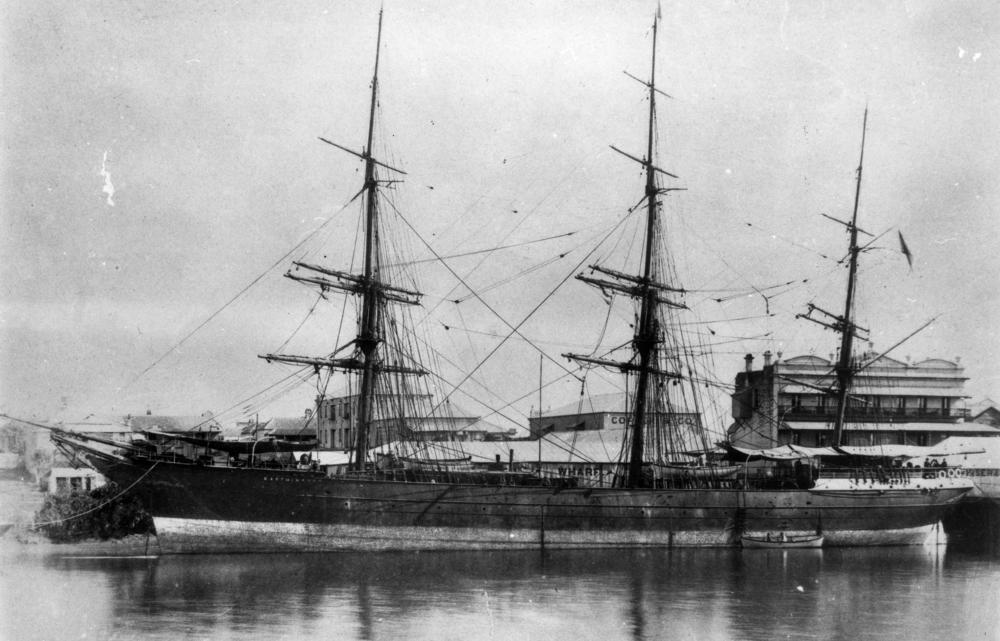
Eastminster in the late 1880s, at Walker's Wharf, Maryborough

The Port of Maryborough, Queensland, was opened in 1847 and in 1859 it was declared a port of entry, meaning that overseas and intercolonial vessels could arrive and depart direct, although there appears to have been considerable uncertainty about the name of the port outside Queensland for some years. Customs officials elsewhere and such publications as the Mercantile Navy List frequently called the port "Wide Bay" well into the 1860s.

== Background ==
The native name of the stream upon which the port is situated was named Moonaboola River by Andrew Petrie, which he discovered on his boat trip in 1842 while looking for good grazing land suitable for sheep. Later Mr Joliffe R.N. became the superintendent for John Eales, a prominent land owner in the Hunter Valley, and brought a flock of sheep across the Darling Downs, blazing a track over the Brisbane Range to establish a head station near Tiaro. This venture was short-lived as the local aboriginal tribes took a liking to the taste of lamb.

George Furber became the first white settler on the south side of the river in 1847, where he set up a trading station and Inn. When Edgar Aldridge, Henry and Richard Palmer, Enoch Rudder and their party arrived in 1848, they crossed the river and settled on the north bank, which was later to be named the Wide Bay Village, now the Old Township Site.

The river became known as the Wide Bay River until after the untimely death of Mary Fitz Roy, Wife of the Governor of New South Wales at that time when it became known as the Mary River. To honour her memory Governor Fitz Roy renamed the stream, Mary, and the post office at the settlement was then called, Maryborough.

== Development ==
When the river became unnavigable to larger vessels a new township was surveyed by Surveyor Labatt in 1852 and in 1854 the small iron-hulled screw steamship William Miskin, built in 1852, 124 tons discharged cargo at the Old Township and was possibly the first steamship to visit the Mary River.

In 1856, the people officially moved down to the new township, where the port was established. Wool became an important commodity and exports through the port in 1860 totalled £107,000 with wool accounting for £98,000 of that figure and imports totalled £71,456. At this time Maryborough was the only port in the colony with a favourable trade balance. Within the next ten years which included the discovery of gold at Gympie and the commencement of the sugar industry, gold took the lead with £756,000, or nine tons, transported in a little over two years, while vessels totalling 163,532 tons visited the port during 1869. The gold was stored in the vault of the Bank of New South Wales. The building now used as the Maryborough Heritage Centre was the second Bank of New South Wales to be built on this site.

== Immigrants ==
From the 1850s to the end of the century the port was one of Australia's busiest immigration ports. Immigrant labour was needed and an advertisement inserted in the Wide Bay & Burnett Times on 23 January 1861 by Messrs Melville & Travis announced that they would be bringing out British migrants while another advertisement by Henry Hamburger said that he would support the emigration of German settlers. Of the migrants landed at Brisbane in 1862 from the ship Suldanha, 160 came to Maryborough by the paddle steamer Clarence. The 42 Germans among them had already been engaged for work on nearby sheep runs.

The first migrant ship to call direct at Maryborough was the barque Ariadne (built in 1861 of 671 Tons). She arrived on 9 October 1862. This was the turning point for the Maryborough and Wide Bay Region, and the number of passengers from the Ariadne swelled the population of Maryborough by one third. Between 1863 and 1870 there were 3,142 arrivals; from 1872 to 1880, 9,164 arrived (of which 1762 were Germans and Scandinavians) and between 1881 and 1890, 7,332 migrants landed. In all nearly 21,000 migrants landed before direct calls were abandoned in 1900, although ships still bought passengers into the port until about 1912.

The Immigration Celebration planned for 29, 30 September and 1 October 2012, to honour the arrival of the Ariadne 150 years ago, it is hoped, will be the first one to be celebrated each year afterwards, as each ship in each subsequent year will celebrate its 150th anniversary of its arrival into the Port of Maryborough.

== Deep water facilities at Urangan ==
As ships became larger, it became more difficult for the larger ships to negotiate the Mary River up to Maryborough. Concerns about the port's ability to cope with exports of Burrum coal were raised as early as 1882. A program of dredging was instituted to ensure the river remained deep and wide enough for navigation. However, by 1911, it was becoming obvious that Maryborough needed a deep water port. This resulted in proposals to construct a pier at Urangan on Hervey Bay to reach into the deep water and then extending the existing railway line from Maryborough to Pialba (which had opened in 1896) through to the pier at Urangan. Construction of Urangan Pier commenced in 1913 and the extension of the railway line to the pier was completed in 1917.

While shipping continue to come to Maryborough, over time more of the vessels went to Urangan. By 1963, commercial shipping to Maryborough had ceased in favour of Urangan. However, Urangan had its limitations as only one vessel could berth at a time and by the 1950s the facilities needed to be expanded to cater for even larger ships. However, the Urangan facilities were not upgraded and opening of the new Port of Bundaberg at Burnett Heads in 1958 created a major local competitor with better facilities. In 1985 the MV Leonard was the last ship to dock at the Urangan Pier, bringing the Port of Maryborough to a close.
