= Original Maryborough Town Site =

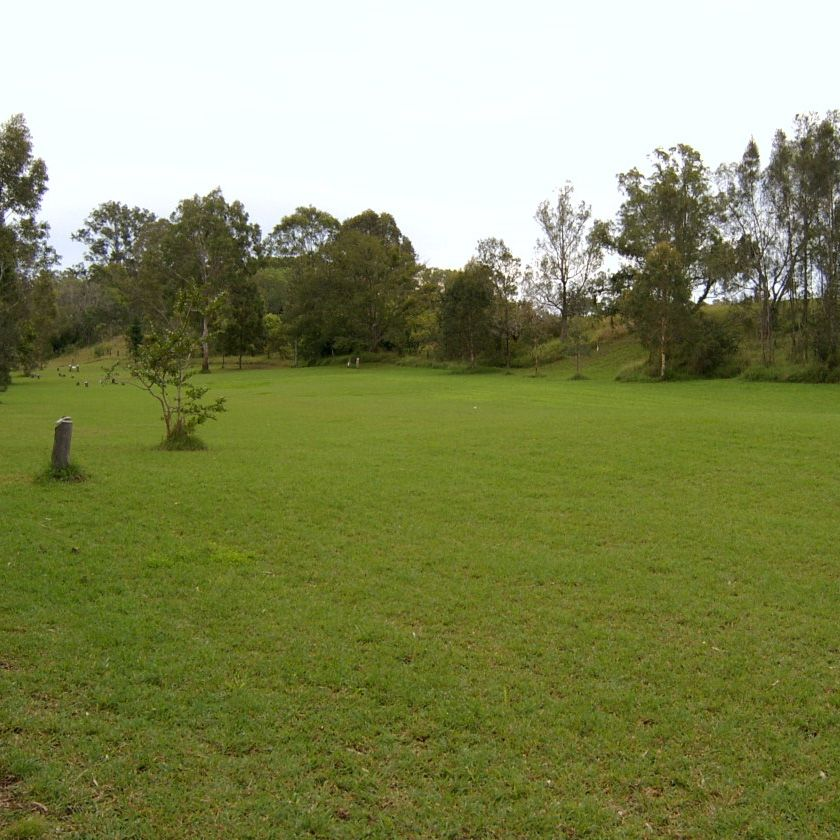
- Looking NW across lower town site, from site of Furber's Inn, near Furber Street, 2005

- Location within Queensland Location within Australia
- 25.5253°S 152.6721°E
- Location: Russell Street, Maryborough, Fraser Coast Region, Queensland, Australia

Queensland Heritage Register
- Official name: Original Maryborough Town Site
- Type: state heritage (archaeological)
- Designated: 4 September 2007
- Reference no.: 602393
- Significant period: 1848 (fabric) & 1840s–1850s (historical use)

Original Maryborough Town Site is a heritage-listed archaeological site at Russell Street, Maryborough, Fraser Coast Region, Queensland, Australia. It was added to the Queensland Heritage Register on 4 September 2007.

== History ==
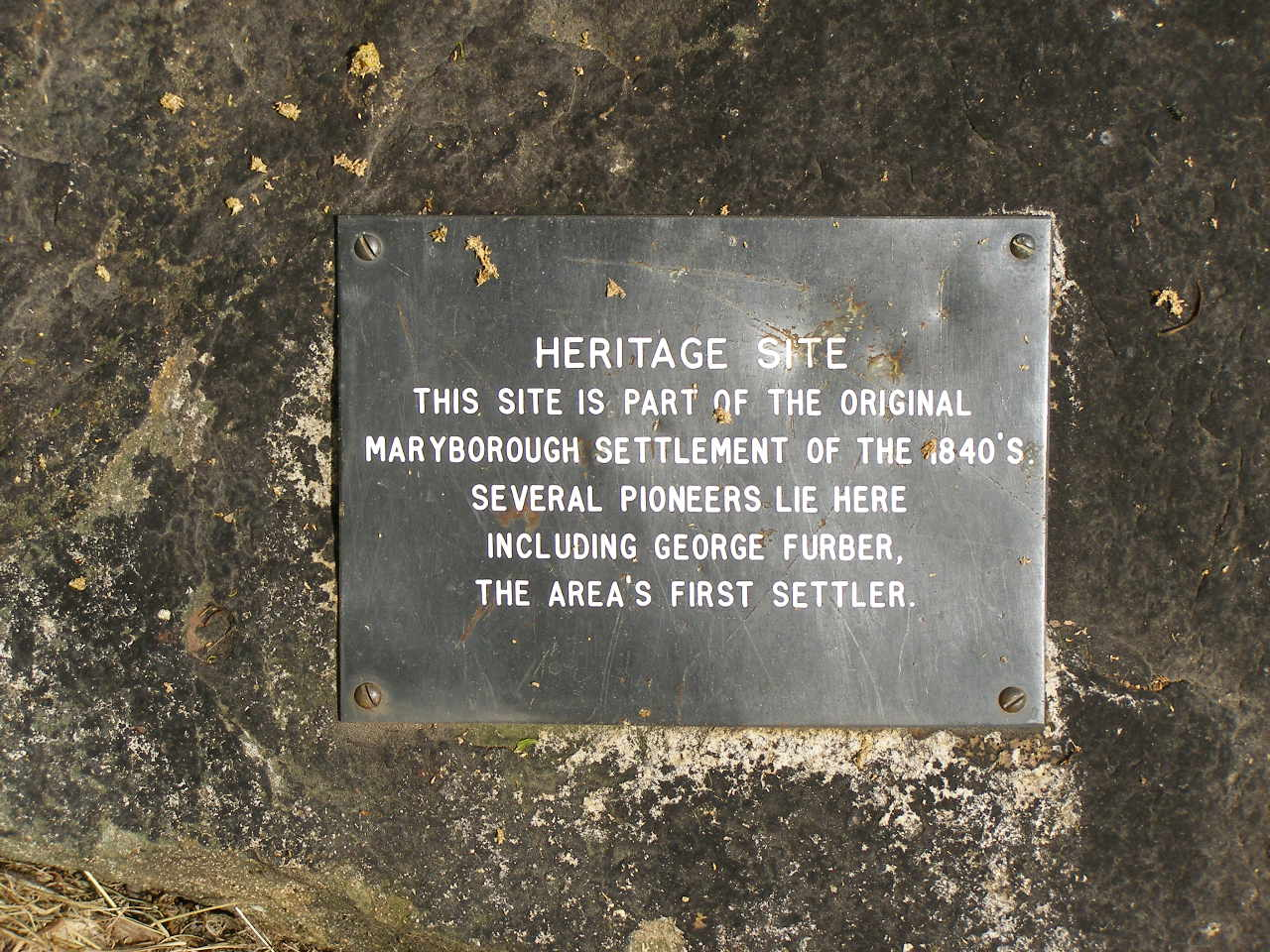
Plaque, Original Maryborough Town Site, 2008

The Original Maryborough Town Site was occupied between 1848 and 1855, and is located about four kilometres northwest of the current city centre, on the southbank of the Mary River. It provides evidence of the early settlement of the Wide Bay district, and is unique amongst the pre-1859 towns of Queensland in that it retains most of its originally occupied town site in an open, relatively undeveloped state. The evocative, peaceful site has the archaeological potential to shed light on life in an early Queensland settlement.

The free settlement of what later became the colony of Queensland commenced on the Darling Downs in 1840. In 1842, the same year that Moreton Bay was opened to free settlement, Andrew Petrie was commissioned to explore the Wide Bay district. With a group of men that included Henry Stuart Russell, the explorer, pastoralist and historian, Petrie travelled by boat to explore the Mary River (then unnamed) as a possible source of Bunya trees. The explorers travelled about 50 miles (80 km) upstream, and it was concluded that the area would prove suitable for sheep rearing as the river would allow wool to be transported by boat. One of the men, Captain Joliffe, was an employee of the pastoralist and businessman John Eales, who later took up a large run at Tiaro and sent Joliffe there with 16,000 sheep. Although this venture failed, due to a combination of disease, attacks by the traditional owners, and financial problems, other pastoralists soon took up runs in the area. By 1847 more than 20 license applications for runs had been lodged in the region. In July 1847 the government surveyor James Charles Burnett gave encouraging reports of the suitability of what was then known as the Wide Bay River as a location for a port to service the area. The river was then named Mary after Lady Mary Lennox, the wife of Governor Fitzroy.

Ipswich publican George Furber arrived in the Wide Bay district in September 1847 to set up a wool store, shanty and wharf on the site of an abandoned outstation of Tiaro, named Girkum, in the midst of open forest on the southern bank of the Mary River. The first shipment of wool was dispatched in December 1847. However, the site was on the wrong side of the river for the sheep runs to the west, and in June 1848 Edgar Thomas Aldridge and the Palmer brothers, Richard and Henry, selected a new site on the north bank of the river, just opposite Furber's business. This site was not the best for ship access, but its closeness to Furber's site, and the fact that it was also open forest, offered some security against potential raids by the local Aboriginal people. The spread of the pastoral frontier and its associated violent disruption of traditional Aboriginal lifestyles and land use inevitably caused conflict between traditional owners and settlers. The site of Maryborough was the traditional country of the Badtjala/Butchulla people, while much the Mary River district further upstream was that of the Gubbi Gubbi/Kabi Kabi.

The Palmers and Aldridge both established inns, along with wool stores and a wharf, and this settlement was known as Wide Bay. The Commissioner for Crown Lands, John Carne Bidwill, arrived in December 1848, and established a camp on a new site nearby on the southern side of the river on the banks of Tinana Creek (now the suburb of Tinana). One of Bidwill's tasks was to find a coastal overland route from Maryborough to Brisbane as an alternative to the then route through Gayndah; however, he died in 1853 without accomplishing this task.

A post office was established on 23 January 1849, and the settlement then became known as Maryborough. That same year J.C Ricketts built an inn in Maryborough. Furber had also opened a liquor establishment on the north bank of the river by 1850, near the mouth of Muddy Creek, but Aldridge's "Bush Inn" did the best business of the four establishments, and he regularly supplied goods and services to the troopers of the Native Police. The presence of so much alcohol soon led to the establishment of a Court of Petty Sessions, in January 1850, with William McAdam being appointed Chief Constable.

By 1850 Maryborough was well established as a commercial centre and as a port for shipping wool, hides, timber, and tallow. Boiling down unwanted sheep produced tallow, used to manufacture soap in Britain, and James D. Walker and Edmund Blucher Uhr had established boiling down plants downstream from the settlement. There were also sawpits between the inns and the river, which were used to square-off timber, including hoop pine (Araucaria cunninghamii) and South Queensland Kauri (Agathis robusta), for ship transport. The Maryborough to Gayndah road snaked northwards through the western side of the settlement, near the Palmer's inn. Chinese vegetable gardens were in place along the banks of Muddy Creek, just east of the settlement, and grew potatoes, turnips, leeks and cabbages.

Although most settlers at Maryborough erected their buildings wherever seemed the most suitable, applications to purchase land were made to the government and, as the amount of wool being shipped from the settlement was increasing dramatically, in 1850 the government appointed a surveyor. Hugh Roland Labatt arrived in July 1850, with instructions to select a suitable site for a township, with regard to providing good conditions for a port. He came to the conclusion that the existing settlement was not the best location, and he preferred the site of Uhr's boiling down plant (now Queen's Park), where the river was deeper and would accommodate larger vessels. As the settlers contested this decision, both sites were surveyed. Maryborough was declared a township in 1851, and had a population of 299, with 142 of these being single adult males, and 24% of the total being Chinese. There were 45 timber and shingle buildings in the area, including a courthouse, church, stores, houses and various inns. The largest occupation group was that of shepherds, stockmen and labourers, followed by the occupation group of commerce, trade and manufacturing.

The first blocks of the new site (near the current Queen's Park) were sold on 14 January 1852. Although many were purchased, and the buyers included Henry Palmer, Aldridge, McAdam, Uhr, and Labatt, relocation did not take place immediately, as many people were naturally reluctant to move when they had established homes and businesses at the old site. In 1855 John G. Walker launched the 75-ton schooner Blue Jacket near the mouth of Muddy (or Baddow) Creek, it being the first boat built on the Mary River. However, as trade at the port of Maryborough grew and more and larger ships called at the wharves at the new site (or East Maryborough), it became apparent that the town at West Maryborough would have to be moved.

Another impetus for the last settlers to abandon the West Maryborough town site may have been the increased raids by Aboriginal people on Maryborough between 1852 and 1855. An axe thrown at him by an Aborigine during a dispute in 1847 over flour rations had wounded George Furber, and he was later accused of killing at least three Aboriginal people in the period after this event. Furber and his son- in-law Joseph Wilmshurst were in turn killed in 1855, while sawing timber next to Tinana Creek. Aldridge, once a stout defender of the old site, moved his business operations to East Maryborough in 1855. By 1856 West Maryborough was virtually abandoned. The site reverted to farming, although Aldridge and McAdam continued to live nearby. In 1883 Aldridge built Baddow House, which still stands just to the southeast of the old town site. He also cultivated extensive gardens around Baddow House and the area they once occupied extends toward the bank of Muddy Creek. Remnants of the gardens also account for some of the exotic vegetation within the regrowth in this area.

The wool trade continued to prosper, and shipping increased immensely after Maryborough was proclaimed a port of entry (the Port of Maryborough) in 1859, and a municipality (the Borough of Maryborough) in 1861. In April 1861 land for agricultural purposes on the Mary River was sold, which accelerated the closer settlement process, and by the end of the 1860s thousands of free immigrants had entered Queensland through the Port of Maryborough. The trade of supplying the goldfields discovered at Gympie in 1867 also went through Maryborough.

Of the early Queensland towns that existed by the time of Separation from New South Wales in 1859, only Maryborough retains most of its originally occupied town site in an open, undeveloped state. The original settlement areas of Brisbane (including at Redcliffe), Dalby, Drayton, Gayndah, Gladstone, Ipswich, Rockhampton, Toowoomba and Warwick have all been developed and are currently occupied.

The site of West Maryborough is largely still undeveloped. Signs were erected in a 1988 Bicentennial project to indicate the sites of various historical structures. Although the site of McAdam's house, southeast of the intersection of George and Aldridge Streets, is now freehold land outside the heritage boundary, the locations of all the remaining buildings of the settlement, as mapped by Labatt in 1850, remain undeveloped in 2014. As indicated in a 1987 archaeological study, the river receded from its 1850s waterline, and waterholes and streams in the area silted over. The vast majority of the surface evidence of the settlement was removed or obscured by the combined effects of flooding or human intervention. The site was periodically flooded and over a metre of silt was deposited on the river terrace where Furber Street is located. Sugar cane was grown over part of the site in the early twentieth century and fossickers have also combed the area for souvenirs.

In 1919 a farmhouse was moved onto the northwest end of the site (outside the Queensland heritage register boundary), near where Palmer's inn stood, but it has been since removed, along with its outbuildings. Cane farming on the pasture that lies to the northwest of the current parkland has resulted in a long mound running parallel to, and to the east of, Queen Street. A Maryborough City Council sewerage treatment plant was built near the location of Aldridge's inn, but was removed by 1987. A long thin mound running through the pasture parallel to, and to the west of, Queen Street may be related to this. The site of the plant's tank was the circular hollow between the sites of the first and second of Aldridge's inns. The stone and concrete jetty near the mouth of Muddy Creek is close to the alignment of Furber's wharf, but was built for the STP outfall pipe.

The known extent of the built township extends outside the heritage register boundary. This area encompasses one-third of the buildings of the settlement, and accommodated a variety of activities - residential, commercial, administrative and pastoral. Structures within this area included Palmer's Inn, Palmer's Store, Blackman's hut, store and enclosed yard, the gaol, Emanuel Thorpe's hut and enclosed yard, and several huts.

In 2007 an archaeological investigation conducted within this area revealed artefacts and features dating to the historical occupation period, including deposits of bottle glass, moulded tobacco pipes, porcelain and stoneware fragments, as well as personal items such as a brass button and a copper half penny.

The lack of previous access to the historical occupation layers (due to the location of later structures, now removed) and improved mapping technology (suggesting possible alternative locations for historic structures), indicate the areas of known occupation outside the heritage register boundary may still have archaeological potential.

For a number of years there was a proposal by the Maryborough City Council and then the Fraser Coast Regional Council to develop part of the site as a residential development.

After a public campaign to save the historic site from development, led by councillor and future mayor George Seymour, the development plans were halted in mid 2016.

In 2025 the Fraser Coast Regional Council maintains and provides interpretation of the town site.

== Description ==
The original Maryborough town site is aligned northwest/southeast along the northern bank of the Mary River, on the northwest outskirts of Maryborough. Indications of the early site include: gravesites; sawpits; stone building foundations; bridge remnants; and archaeological material. The site stretches over a series of creek-lined gullies and is currently occupied by a mixture of open parkland, pasture and heavy vegetation. The main entry to the site is along Aldridge Street, the only surveyed road within the town site that is sealed and open to public vehicles. This road did not exist when the town was settled and the park area near the intersection of Alice and Aldridge Streets was originally the cemetery.

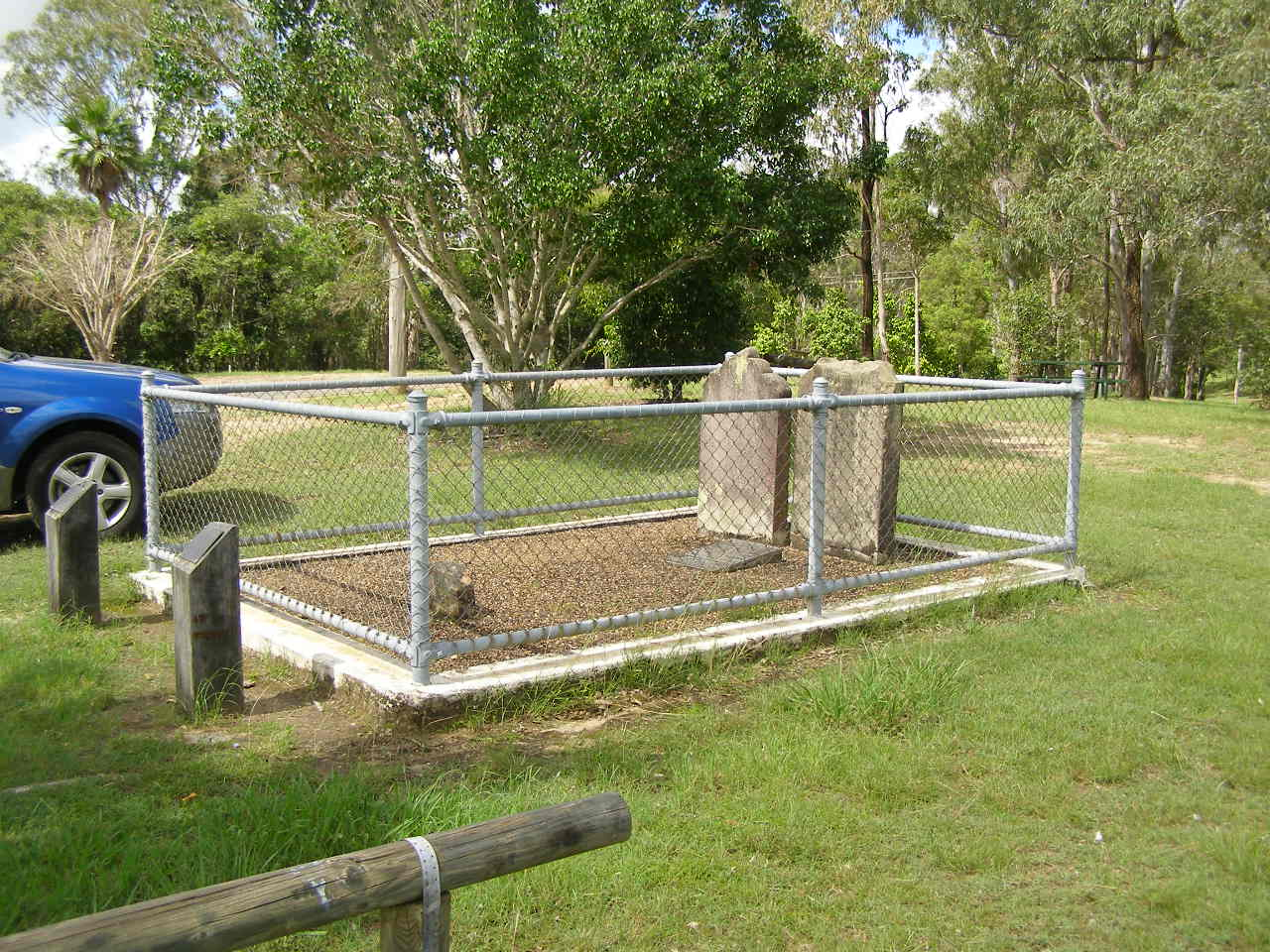
Graves of the Furber family at Original Maryborough Town Site, 2008

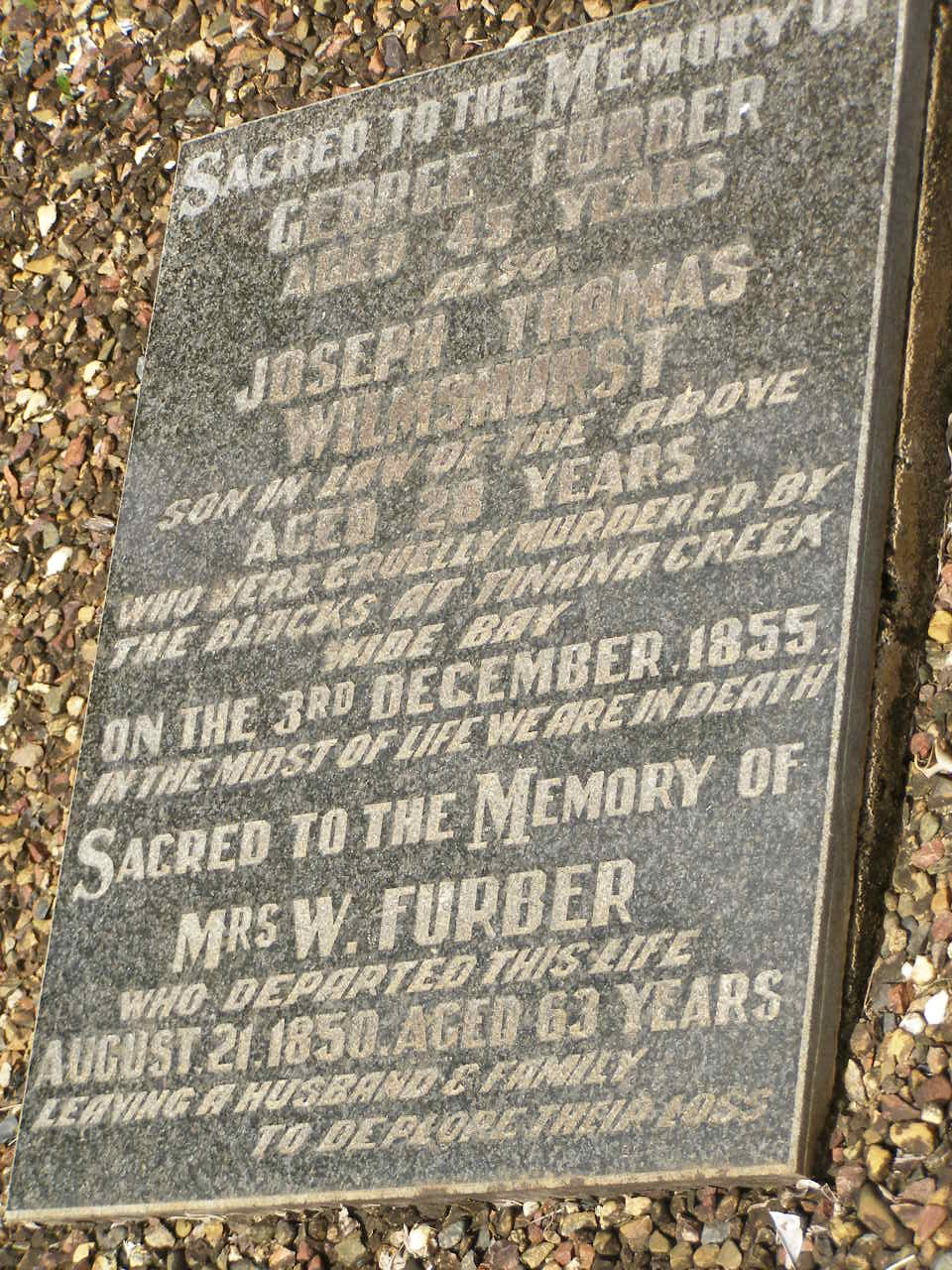
Modern plaque on Furber family grave, Maryborough Pioneer Cemetery, 2008

The extent of the cemetery is not known but the grass-covered park on the northwest side of Aldridge Street contains the marked graves of George Furber and Joseph Wilmshurst. The park contains at least one other identified grave, now marked only by a headstone plinth. Numerous other depressions in the ground are suggestive of several unmarked graves. Two more marked graves are located on the opposite side of Aldridge Street.

The site extends southwest down both sides of Aldridge Street. Just past the (unformed) intersection with George Street the road crosses a creek at the bottom of a gully. In the creek bed on the southeast side of the road are the remains of the original creek crossing. These consist largely of remnants of structural timbers. The large park area on this side of Aldridge Street was originally the site of Chinese gardens. There is a carpark at the southwest end of Aldridge Street, which currently stops short of Queen Street. From the carpark, the site of Aldridge's first inn lies to the west.

Muddy Creek runs through the southeast side of the site, and joins the Mary River southwest of the end of Aldridge Street. The land to the southeast of Aldridge Street and the site of Aldridge's inns drops down towards the creek. East of the creek's mouth is a concentration of bamboo, mature native trees and other exotic species, and a small stone and concrete jetty stands just upriver from the mouth of Muddy Creek, near the site of Furber's inn.

Northwest of the mouth of Muddy Creek, the terrain rises from the river to a river terrace, where Furber Street is located. The river terrace is quite flat and is framed by Muddy Creek to the southeast, a ridge to the northwest near the junction of Furber Street and Palmer Street, and another ridge to the northeast the parallels to the Mary River. Much of the original township spread along the top of the northeastern ridge, with most buildings located on the southwest side of Queen Street.

The lower river terrace is covered with over a metre of flood-deposited sediment that has help protect archaeological material; council workers have encountered archaeological deposits during on-site works. The topsoil on the main ridge along Queen Street has been scoured in some areas, reducing its archaeological potential. Shale and coarse stone is evident where the ground is bare along the ridge. Some stone foundation work remains on the site of Aldridge's first inn. Behind the Queen Street ridge the land dips, before rising towards a second ridge.

The river terrace, the site of Aldridge's two inns, the land by Muddy Creek, and the site of the pioneer graveyard, is largely open grassed parkland dotted with trees. Much of the old township is located in an adjacent paddock to the northwest. The paddock is largely clear of trees. There is patchy grass cover, with some areas of bare earth. The line of the old Gayndah road can still be seen, descending to the river terrace from near the site of Palmer's inn. There is little above-surface evidence of the town, but the placement of the structure markers enable the town's layout to be understood. Some features such as the marked graves and sawpits are clearly evident. Modern built features within the heritage boundary are not of cultural heritage significance.

== Heritage listing ==
Original Maryborough Town Site was listed on the Queensland Heritage Register on 4 September 2007 having satisfied the following criteria.

The place is important in demonstrating the evolution or pattern of Queensland's history.

The Original Maryborough Town Site demonstrates the evolution of early settlements in Queensland's history, in particular the movement of pastoralists and timber-getters into the Wide Bay district in the 1840s, and their need for a safe port to ship their products and to bring in supplies.

Established in 1848 and largely abandoned by 1856, the town site provides relatively undisturbed evidence of early European occupation in the Wide Bay Region. Its abandonment reflects the need to establish a viable settlement with better river access.

The place demonstrates rare, uncommon or endangered aspects of Queensland's cultural heritage.

The Original Maryborough Town Site is unique among the early town sites of Queensland. Of those towns in existence by the time of Separation from New South Wales in 1859, Maryborough is the only one that retains most of its originally occupied town site in an open, relatively undeveloped condition.

The place has potential to yield information that will contribute to an understanding of Queensland's history.

As a rare example of an early and substantial Queensland town site that has remained in a relatively undeveloped state since its abandonment, the Original Maryborough Town Site has the potential to yield information that will contribute to our understanding of Queensland's history.

The abandonment of the town site, the subsequent lack of development, and regular flooding that has deposited a protective layer of alluvium over the lower areas of the site, means the site has the potential to reveal, through archaeological investigation, important and new information about everyday life and work in an early Queensland settlement.

Archaeological investigation may provide evidence of the town's occupants, the buildings of the settlement, burials, early streets and industrial sites such as sawpits, yards and jetties that together may provide a more complete and accurate understanding of this important and early Queensland settlement.
