= Philip Oliver Ellard Hawkes =

Australian architect

Philip Oliver Ellard Hawkes was an architect who practiced in the Wide Bay area of Queensland, Australia, from 1910 to 1942. A number of his works are heritage-listed.

== Life and career ==
Hawkes was born in 1882 in New South Wales. Hawkes worked in Perth, Launceston and Melbourne. Moving to Queensland, he worked briefly for the Works Department in 1909 before setting up his own practice in Bundaberg and Maryborough in 1910. He designed a number of premises for the Queensland National Bank; most of these were simple timber buildings, although the Kingaroy branch was a two storey masonry building, also in a Classical Revival style. This also featured round headed arches as do the Carroll Cottage and Carrollee Hotel in Kingaroy, which were also designed by Hawkes.

== Notable works ==
- Queensland National Bank, Childers
- Goomeri Hall of Memory
- St Pauls Anglican Church and Hall, Maryborough
- Maryborough War Memorial
- Pialba Memorial Cenotaph
- Lady Musgrave Maternity Hospital and nurses' quarters at Maryborough Base Hospital
- St Mary's Roman Catholic Church, Maryborough
