= Queensland National Bank, Childers =

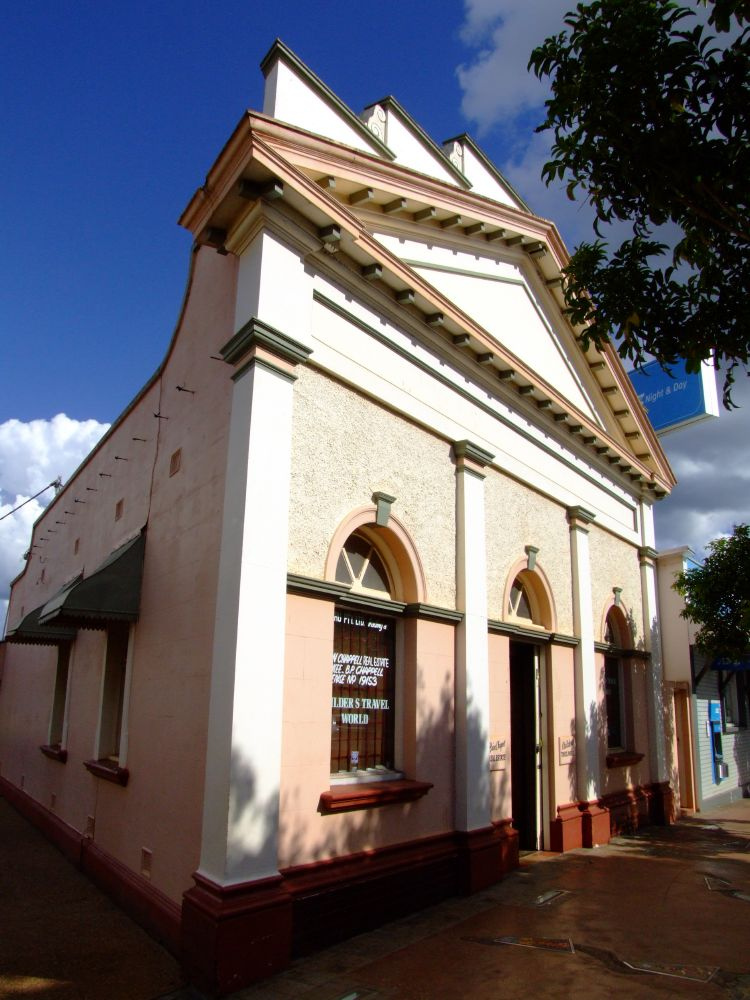
- Former Queensland National Bank, 2008

- Location within Queensland Location within Australia
- 25.2366°S 152.2795°E
- Location: 50 Churchill Street, Childers, Bundaberg Region, Queensland, Australia

History
- Design period: 1914–1919 (World War I)
- Built: 1919

Site notes
- Architect: Philip Oliver Ellard Hawkes
- Architectural style: Classicism

Queensland Heritage Register
- Official name: Queensland National Bank (former), Childers Travel World, Wrench & Cobb, Ye Olde Boutique
- Type: state heritage (built)
- Designated: 21 October 1992
- Reference no.: 600610
- Significant period: 1910s (fabric); 1919–1943 (historical use)
- Significant components: banking chamber, residential accommodation – manager's house/quarters, furniture/fittings, strong room

Queensland National Bank is a heritage-listed former bank building at 50 Churchill Street, Childers, Bundaberg Region, Queensland, Australia. It was designed by Philip Oliver Ellard Hawkes and built in 1919. It is also known as Childers Travel World, Wrench & Cobb, and Ye Olde Boutique. It was added to the Queensland Heritage Register on 21 October 1992.

== History ==
The former Queensland National Bank is a masonry building in the main street of Childers and was the second building used by this bank on this site. It was erected in 1919 to the design of Maryborough architect POE Hawkes.

The Queensland National Bank was the first and most successful of Queensland's three indigenous 19th century banks. It was established in March 1872 by a group of prominent Queensland squatters, politicians, lawyers, and businessmen who wished to secure development capital free from overseas or intercolonial control. Its first office was established in Queen Street, Brisbane in that year and the bank attracted widespread Queensland patronage. In 1879 it secured the whole of the Queensland Government's banking business. By 1880 it held 40% of deposits in the colony and dominated the Queensland economy. This was not, however, the first bank established in Childers, the Bank of North Queensland and the Commercial Banking Company of Sydney both being present in the 1890s and erecting premises in the newly emerging sugar town in 1900.

Following logging of the dense Isis Scrub in the 1870s, Childers, in the heart of the scrub, was promoted by Maryborough interests in the 1880s as an agricultural district. The land in the immediate vicinity of the present town was surveyed in 1882 into 50 acres (20 ha) farm blocks. There was no official town survey and Childers developed following private subdivision at the railhead of the 1887 Isis railway line from Isis Junction. This was opened on 31 October 1887, and was intended principally to facilitate the transport of timber from the scrub. The coming of the railway not only promoted the development of the town of Childers; it also provided the catalyst for the establishment of a sugar industry in the district. At the opening of the railway to Childers, Robert Cran, owner of Maryborough's Yengarie mill, announced that he would erect a double crushing juice mill at Doolbi, to supply his mill at Yengarie, completed in 1890. Further expansion of the sugar industry in the Isis was closely related to the activities of the Colonial Sugar Refining Company, which erected a central crushing mill in the district 1893–94, and began crushing in 1895. By this time, at least three other mills had been established in the Isis, with another two under construction, and Childers had emerged as the centre of a substantial sugar-growing district. In 1903 the old Isis Divisional Board (1886) was abolished and Isis Shire proclaimed, with the new seat of municipal government moving from Howard to Childers.

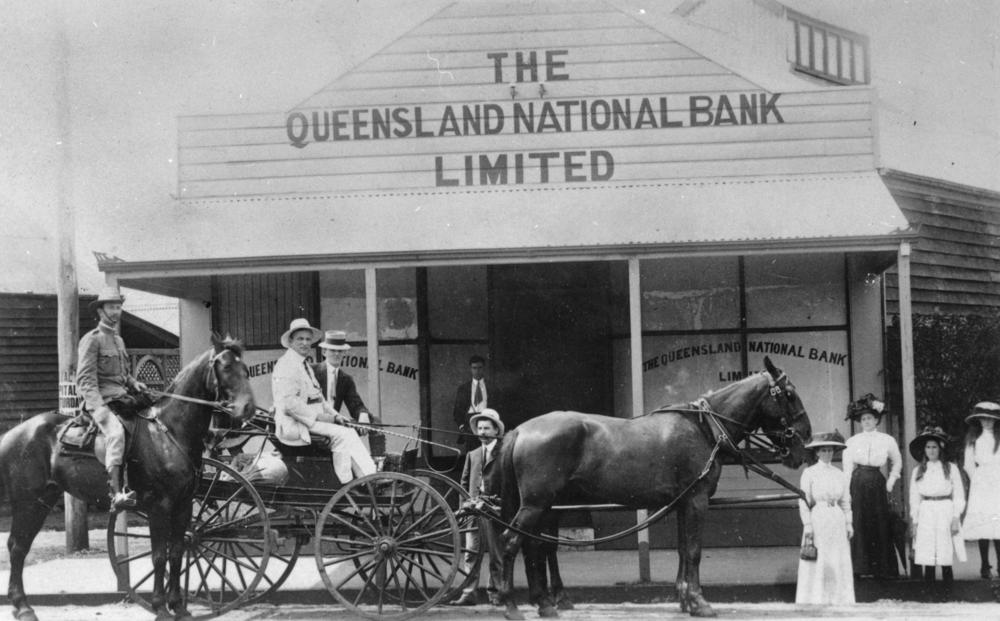
The first bank building of the Queensland National Bank in Childers, 1912

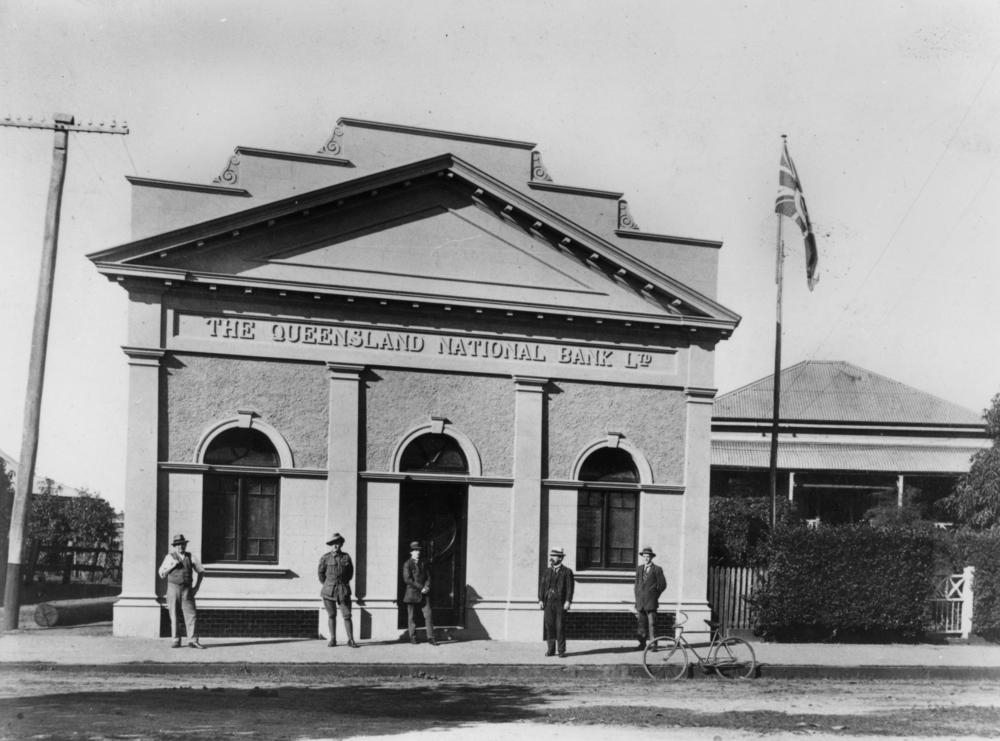
Queensland National Bank, Childers, 1919

Whilst Queensland in general was slow to recover from the depression of the early 1890s and the 1893 banking crisis, the growth of commerce in Childers was attractive to banking institutions contemplating expansion. The Queensland National Bank initially rented a timber commercial building on this site, together with an adjacent timber house as a residence for the bank manager and opened for business on 9 July 1900. In 1909 they purchased this property and in 1919 erected a new and more prestigious building to the design of Maryborough architect, POE Hawkes. An undated floor plan in the archives of the National Australia Bank (the ultimate successor to the Queensland National Bank) shows what appears to be the current building. It has counters surrounding a public area, a room for clerical use behind them, a specially reinforced strong room, a manager's room and a bathroom and bedroom for the bank officer to the rear. The bank was constructed by a Mr Steffensen at a cost of £1645 and the previous building was sold for removal.

Architect Philip Oliver Ellard Hawkes was born in 1882 in New South Wales and worked in Perth, Launceston and Melbourne. Moving to Queensland, he worked briefly for the Works Department in 1909 before setting up his own practice in Bundaberg and Maryborough in 1910. He designed a number of premises for the QN Bank: most of these were simple timber buildings, although the Kingaroy branch was a two-storey masonry building, also in a classical revival style. This also featured round headed arches as do the Carroll Cottage and Carrollee Hotel in Kingaroy, which were also designed by Hawkes.

In 1943, a wartime rationalisation of branches in smaller centres resulted in the Commercial Banking Company and the Queensland National Bank closing their Childers branches. The QN branch closed on 18 January 1943 and the property was purchased by Wrench and Copp, an accounting firm. It was probably then that the bank counters were removed and a further small office built into the corner of the former banking chamber. In 1948, the QN Bank merged with the National Bank of Australasia, later the National Australia Bank, who already had premises on the opposite side of Churchill Street. In 1973 the former QN Bank building was purchased by the current owners who and operated it for many years as a clothing shop called Ye Olde Boutique. It later became a real estate agency and travel agency. In 2015, it is being used by a medical practitioner.

== Description ==
The former Queensland National Bank building is single story rendered brick building designed to fit an irregularly shaped corner block on the main street of Childers. It has a hipped roof concealed by a stepped parapet and an imposing, classically influenced street elevation. This is separated into bays by pilasters and features a heavy triangular pediment above an arched entrance flanked by a pair of matching arched windows. The upper section of the wall is finished with rough cast render. The entrance doors appear to be original, having a pair of semicircular glass panes echoing the arches of door and windows and large brass and timber handles.

The elevation to Ashby Lane is very plain with a parapet which conceals the roof and slopes away to the rear. It has two sash windows shaded by sun hoods, as does the other side which now faces the ANZ bank across a narrow laneway.

The interior of the building has timber ceilings and plastered walls. It retains the main features of the original layout including the manager's office, a strong room and part of the teller's counter and cash drawers. A further office has been constructed in the corner of the former banking chamber. A small hall leads into the former bedroom which has been divided by a partition wall into a kitchen and store, possibly in the 1970s.

The bank building itself is very close to its original appearance in form and interior layout; however, a large modern concrete block building has been constructed to its rear and is connected to it by a passageway.

== Heritage listing ==
The former Queensland National Bank building in Childers was listed on the Queensland Heritage Register on 21 October 1992 having satisfied the following criteria.

The place is important in demonstrating the evolution or pattern of Queensland's history.

The former Queensland National Bank building is important in illustrating the development of Queensland because it was purpose built as premises for a bank formed to serve Queensland interests and needs when the state was a self-governing colony. The quality of its design and construction also demonstrate the importance of this regional branch at a time when Childers had established itself as the flourishing centre of a substantial sugar-growing district.

The place is important in demonstrating the principal characteristics of a particular class of cultural places.

It is important in demonstrating the principal characteristics of a regional bank of its era, from the reassuring conservatism of the classically influenced design, to the layout which provided a reinforced strongroom and allowed for staff accommodation.

The place is important because of its aesthetic significance.

As a well designed and detailed building it contributes to the picturesque townscape of Churchill Street which is both remarkably architecturally coherent and intact.

The place has a special association with the life or work of a particular person, group or organisation of importance in Queensland's history.

It has a special association with the life and work of Maryborough architect POE Hawkes, who designed a number of banks for the Queensland National Bank, of which this is one of the most substantial. It is also associated with the development of the QN Bank, the earliest of Queensland's indigenous banks.
