= St Paul's Anglican Church, Maryborough =

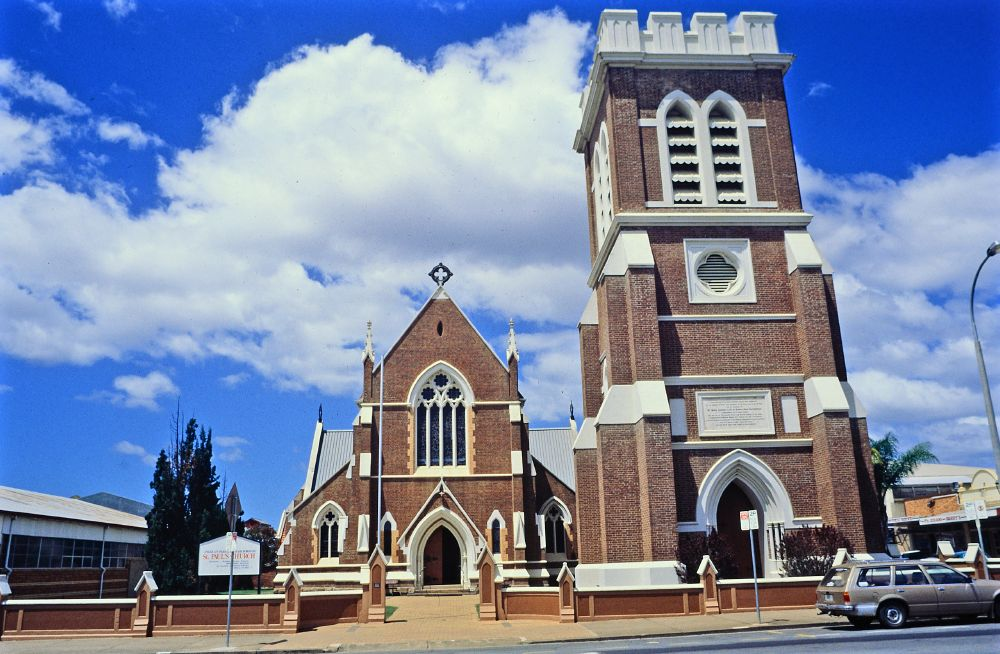
- St Pauls Anglican Church and Hall, 1997

- Location within Queensland Location within Australia
- 25.5388°S 152.7008°E
- Location: 178–202 Adelaide Street, Maryborough, Fraser Coast Region, Queensland, Australia

History
- Design period: 1870s–1890s (late 19th century)
- Built: 1878–1921

Site notes
- Architect: Francis Drummond Greville Stanley

Queensland Heritage Register
- Official name: St Pauls Anglican Church and Hall
- Type: state heritage (built)
- Designated: 21 October 1992
- Reference no.: 600705
- Significant period: 1870s (historical); 1870s, 1880s, 1920s (fabric)
- Significant components: church, stained glass window/s, church hall/sunday school hall, tower – bell / belfry

St Paul's Anglican Church is a heritage-listed church at 178–202 Adelaide Street, Maryborough, Fraser Coast Region, Queensland, Australia. It was designed by Francis Drummond Greville Stanley and built from 1878 to 1921. It was added to the Queensland Heritage Register on 21 October 1992.

== History ==
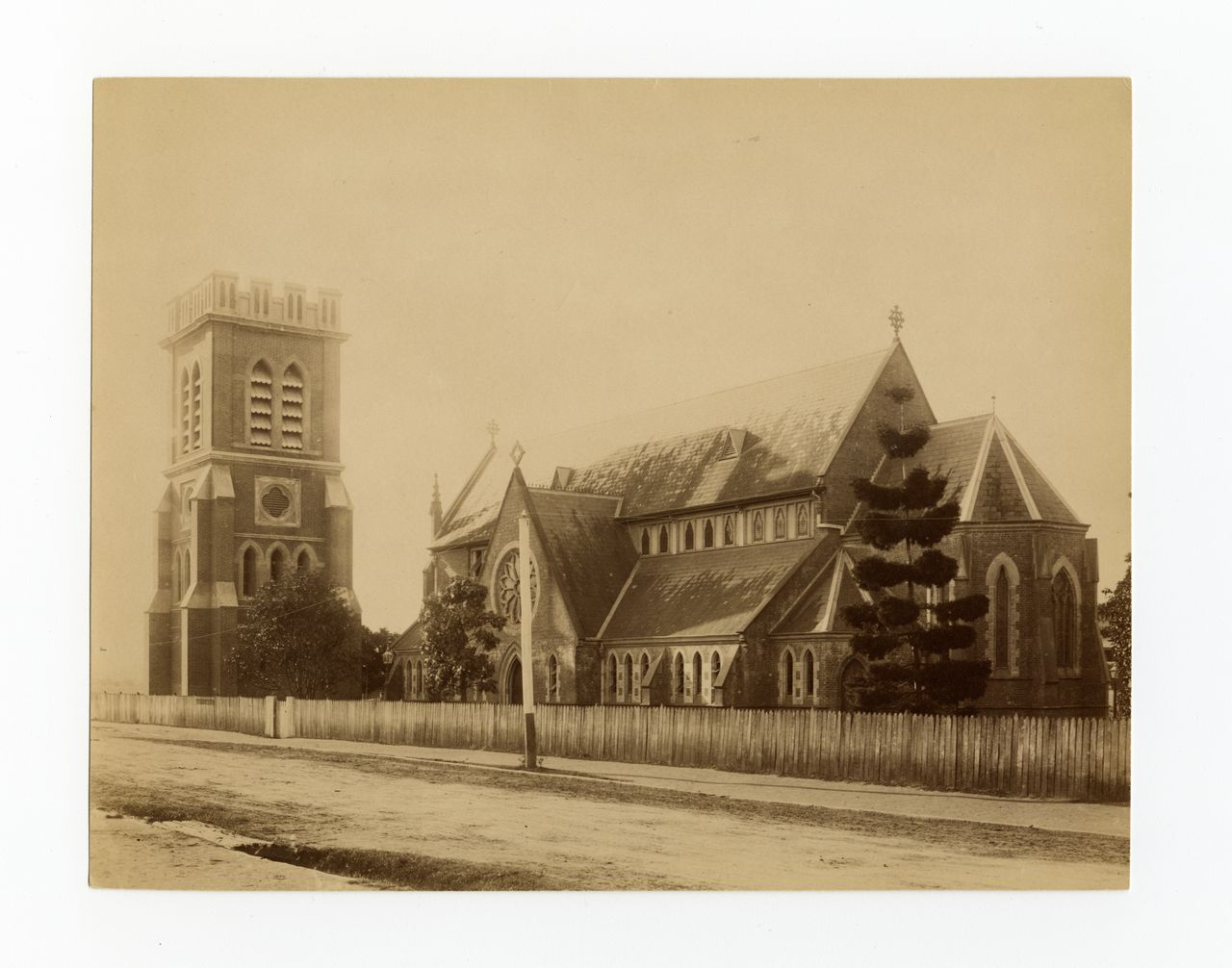
St Paul's Anglican Church and bell tower, Maryborough, 1891

St Paul's Anglican Church was constructed as the third Maryborough Church of England, replacing a timber church on the same site. The building was designed by prominent Queensland architect, FDG Stanley in 1879. A large memorial hall, designed by local architect, P.O.E. Hawkes, was added to the church site in 1921.

The original township of Maryborough was situated, not in its current place, but on the north of the Mary River, after wharves were established in 1847–1848 providing transport for wool from sheep stations on the Burnett River. In 1850 Surveyor, Hugh Roland Labatt arrived in Maryborough with instructions to "examine the River Mary...to suggest ...the best site or sites for the laying out of the town, having regard to the convenience of shipping on one hand and internal communication on the other...also...point out the spots desirable as reserves for public building, church, quay and for places for public recreation." The site recommended by Labatt was not where settlement was established but further east and from the early 1850s this is where the growing town developed.

The first Maryborough Church of England was constructed at the early settlement in 1852 and this was a timber slab building with shingled roof not exceeding £30 in cost. Much of the material and labour of this early church was provided without cost by the local community and in this year the first pastor, Reverend E. Tanner arrived in Maryborough. In 1853 the Parish of Maryborough was formed as the most northerly outpost of the Diocese of Newcastle.

With the movement of the town following Labatt's survey, the timber church was dismantled and re-erected on land in Lennox Street which has been variously described as being donated to the church by early Maryborough citizen, ET Aldridge or as being secured for £21 by the church in early land sales in Maryborough. The Church of England retains this land as their principal Maryborough property to this day. Upon re-erection of the first timber church, a timber belfry complete with bells were added to the site.

This newly erected church remained in use for ten years, until it was replaced with another timber church dedicated as St Paul's Episcopal church on 27 May 1866. This church was designed by Maryborough architect, William Montgomerie Davenport Davidson, who as a church warden provided his services without charge. Maryborough flourished in the late 1860s as a result of the discovery of gold in Gympie in 1867, for which Maryborough was the port. The trade of supplying the gold field went through Maryborough leading to the establishment of several secondary industries and a consequent growth in the population. During the 1870s immigration schemes and the introduction of indentured labour caused more population increases in Maryborough.

By 1877 a decision was made by the parish to construct a new permanent masonry building and the foundations tone of this new structure was laid by Sir Arthur Kennedy in March 1878. The services of Colonial Architect, Francis Drummond Greville Stanley were sought and he furnished the church with a design. Although Stanley was employed by the Queensland Government as the Queensland Colonial Architect, effectively from 1871 until 1881, he was allowed to continue with private commissions but this remained a contentious point throughout his employment as other architects complained. In October 1877, Stanley submitted a resignation to the government detailing how he needed to supplement his income with private work which was causing him health problems. When granted a salary increase he withdrew his resignation but argued that he was committed to the work at St Paul's, Maryborough which he then brought to completion. Stanley resigned officially and vacated his position in July 1881.

The design Stanley provided to the Church of England for their church in Maryborough was very similar to his design for the Holy Trinity Church of England in Fortitude Valley. Both churches are constructed of brick on a masonry foundation and have a similar traditional church floorplan of central nave flanked by aisles with apsidal chancel and porch entrance. The clerestory in both buildings is supported on a cast iron pointed arched arcade extending for the length of the nave, with cedar panels set in the spandrels of the arches.

St Paul's Church of England was opened on 30 August 1879 by the bishop of Brisbane, Matthew Hale, and the bishop of North Queensland, George Stanton. The building was constructed at a cost of about £6000, and a report in the local newspaper described the completed building as Queensland's cathedral in reference to its size, architecture and prominence, thought to be greater than other Churches of England built in Queensland to that date. The report continues on to detail some of the internal decoration:

"The chancel has a neatly framed roof with quarter diagonals decorated with rosettes in alternating spaces ... The lower windows in the sides, with the western ad wheel windows are of the new diamond glass - one whole sheet each with false diamonds and with the stained glass windows of the chancel were imported expressly for the church. The upper windows in lead frames were made in Maryborough. By night the church is lit by means of rose lights containing 12 jets one of which stands in every arch."

The church was constructed by local contractors: Mr Caldwell who was responsible for the masonry work and Mr Taylor, responsible for carpentering. The report does state that the building is similar to the Holy Trinity Church but calls St Paul's "a vast improvement being very much larger and less costly". By 1883 an organ gallery was added to the north western end, also designed by FDG Stanley.

The next substantial addition to the church was in 1887 when a large free-standing bell tower was erected near the church. The structure, with nine bells cast by Mears White Chapel Bell Founders of London, cost £3500, which was donated by ET Aldridge, at whose suggestion the tower was constructed in memory of his wife, Maria. According to the National Trust of Queensland, the bell tower is believed to house the only full peal of bells in Queensland.

Another large addition was made to the site in 1921 when a memorial Hall designed by local architect, POE Hawkes was constructed. The hall was dedicated to the "glory of God and the memory of those who fell in the Great War". The foundation stone was laid on 3 August 1920 to coincide with a visit to Maryborough by the Prince of Wales (later Edward VIII). The building, which was designed to harmonise with the church, housed a hall with a stage, two dressing rooms and two vestries along with two wide verandahs which would serve to provide supper rooms and open-air classrooms. The hall was constructed by local contractor WE Ferguson at a cost of £5980. POE Hawkes was an innovative local architect responsible for many fine inter-war buildings in Maryborough, including residences and commercial buildings.

Within the church a Warrior's Chapel was dedicated on 3 July 1960 and Our Lady's Chapel was dedicated on 17 March 1963. Both the church and the hall remain substantially intact.

== Description ==
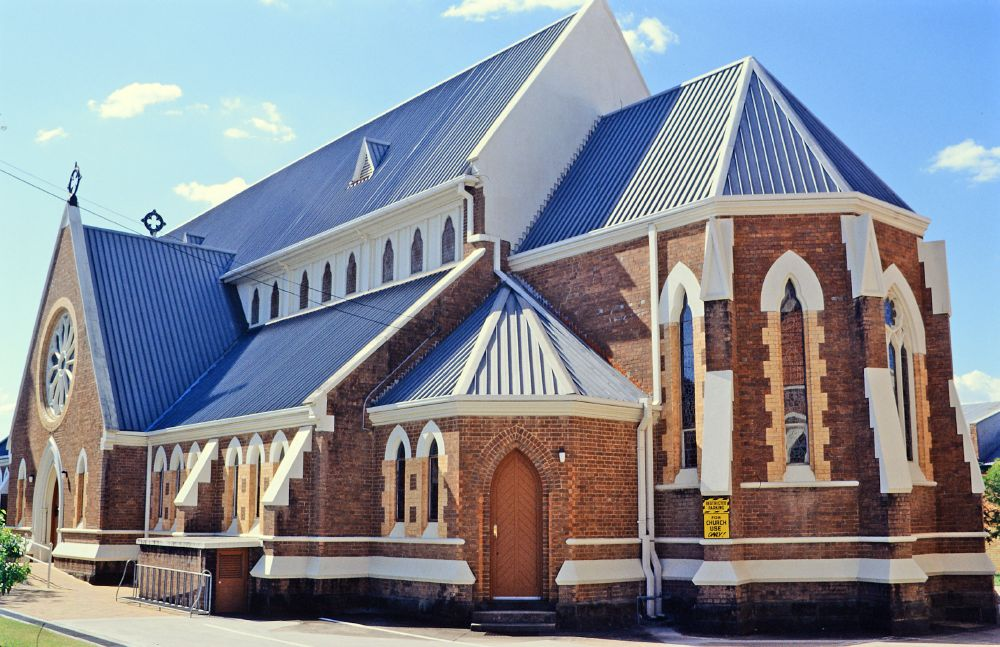
Church, 1995

St Paul's Anglican Church and Hall are prominently located on the corner of Lennox, Ellena and Adelaide Streets in Maryborough. The site comprises three principal elements, the church, facing north west to Lennox Street, the hall, aligned with the church along Ellena Street but facing south east to Adelaide Street, and a large detached tower in the western corner, adjacent to the Lennox and Ellena Streets corner.

St Paul's Church is a large nineteenth-century Gothic revival building constructed of face brick with polychrome brick and stuccoed detailing. The building has a traditional cruciform plan, with nave flanked by aisles running parallel to Ellena Street, shallow transepts bisecting the nave and an apsidal chancel at the south eastern end. The modern Zincalume-like clad roof is steeply pitched over the nave, with gabled projections over the transepts and hipped over the chancels. The side aisles of the church are skillion roofed and abut the nave below the trefoiled clerestory window openings.

The principal facade of the church has a centrally located shallow porched entrance, formed by a steeply pitched gable, within which is a heavily moulded pointed arched doorway. Flanking the doorway, at ground floor level are thin lancets detailed like all of the other openings on the church, with contrasting brick quoining and a stuccoed head and sill. The nave of the church is framed on this elevation by attached buttressing which projects above the roofline and terminates in pinnacles decorated with crockets. On the face of the side aisles, flanking this central bay of the church, are traceried window openings, comprising two trefoiled lancets and quatrefoils above. Over the central entrance of this facade is a large traceried window comprising four lancets and three foiled windows above. Surmounting the apex of the gable on this elevation is a stone finial-like element which comprises a circular disc with a quatrefoil cutout.

Internally, the church is divided into nave and aisles by a nave arcade of pointed arched openings supported on clustered cast iron columns. In the spandrels of the arched openings are timber panels with foiled cutouts. Arched braced timber roof trusses support the roof and these also feature timber panels with foiled cutouts. Entrances from the transepts are concealed with timber panelled boxes around the doors. Above these boxes are large wheel windows, glazed with coloured glass. Lining the side aisles are lancets generally glazed with stained glass panels. The chancel is divided from the nave by a pointed arch chancel screen. Within the chancel which has a semi-domed timber-framed ceiling, are four panels of early stained glass.

The tower, adjacent to the church, is a three-storeyed battlemented structure which is missing a spire. Attached buttressing strengthens the corners of the structure, which has string coursing defining the floor levels. The many lancet openings, in a group of three on the first floor and paired on the floor above, are all surrounded with stuccoed detailing. The tower is surmounted by a battlemented parapet above a moulded cornice which projects from the line of the building.

St Paul's Hall is a substantial brick building, of similar proportion and massing to the church, housing a central auditorium with a steeply pitched gabled roof, clad with terracotta tiles. The hall is flanked by side aisles and the building has transept elements at the north western end and apsidal chapels flanking the principal, south eastern, facade. The building is constructed of brick with stuccoed detailing. The principal facade features a central projecting porch to which entrance is through the two return sides. The porch is surmounted by a wide band of rough cast stuccoed panelling, with a central pediment, acting as a parapet. This facade has bands of stucco, and is divided into bays by buttressing terminating in pinnacles above the roof line. The side elevations of the building, are lined with semi-open verandahs, above which on the face of the body of the hall are large arched clerestory window openings. Penetrating the roof are small hipped roof ventilators. Light modern extensions have been made to the south eastern end of the hall.

== Heritage listing ==
St Paul's Anglican Church and Hall was listed on the Queensland Heritage Register on 21 October 1992 having satisfied the following criteria.

The place is important in demonstrating the evolution or pattern of Queensland's history.

St Paul's Anglican Church, constructed as the third Church of England in Maryborough demonstrates the growth of the town during the nineteenth century. The size and quality of design of the building are evidence of the prominence of Maryborough as a port and centre for the Burnett region in the nineteenth century.

The place demonstrates rare, uncommon or endangered aspects of Queensland's cultural heritage.

The hall is an unusual example of a memorial hall built as part of a church complex. The bell tower houses a rare example of a full peal of bells in Queensland. The church and hall have considerable architectural and aesthetic merit as well composed prominent Maryborough buildings.

The place is important in demonstrating the principal characteristics of a particular class of cultural places.

The church is characteristic of a substantial nineteenth-century Gothic revival ecclesiastical building.

The place has a special association with the life or work of a particular person, group or organisation of importance in Queensland's history.

The buildings are associated with important Queensland architects, FDG Stanley and POE Hawkes.
