= St Mary's Church, Maryborough =

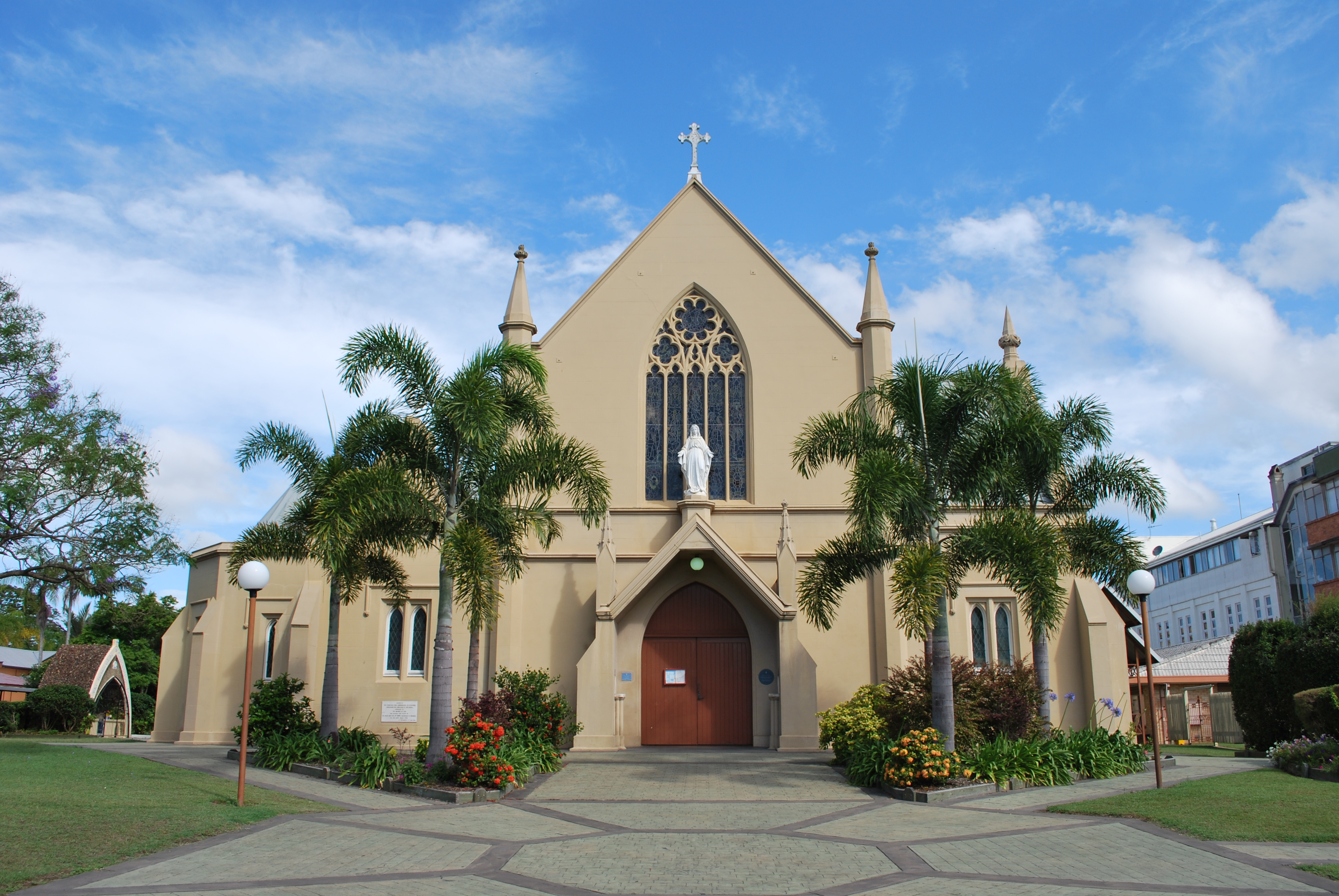
- St Mary's Roman Catholic Church, 2008

- Location in Queensland
- 25°32′14″S 152°42′13″E
- Location: 271–275 Adelaide Street, Maryborough, Fraser Coast Region, Queensland
- Country: Australia
- Denomination: Roman Catholic
- Website: stmarysparishmaryborough.com

History
- Status: Parish church
- Founded: 29 July 1869
- Founder: James Cleary

Architecture
- Functional status: Active
- Architects: Charles Tiffin (1869); Francis Drummond Greville Stanley (1884–85); POE Hawkes (1936)
- Architectural type: Church
- Style: Gothic Revival
- Years built: 1869–1936
- Completed: 4 February 1872

Specifications
- Materials: Stuccoed masonry church; Stone and concrete grotto; Modern steel and canvas shelters

Administration
- Archdiocese: Brisbane
- Parish: St Mary’s

Clergy
- Priest: Fr Lucius Edomobi

Queensland Heritage Register
- Official name: St Marys Roman Catholic Church
- Type: State heritage (built)
- Designated: 21 October 1992
- Reference no.: 600692
- Significant period: 1860s (historical); 1860s, 1880s, 1930s (fabric) ongoing (social)
- Significant components: Stained glass window/s, church, furniture/fittings
- Builders: G Smith and J Thomas

St Mary's Church is a heritage-listed Roman Catholic church at 271–275 Adelaide Street, Maryborough, Fraser Coast Region, Queensland, Australia, on land donated to the Church by Maryborough pioneer James Cleary. It was initially designed by Charles Tiffin with later additions and alterations by Francis Drummond Greville Stanley and POE Hawkes. The initial construction was from 1869 to 1872 by G Smith and J Thomas. It was added to the Queensland Heritage Register on 21 October 1992.

== History ==
St Mary's Roman Catholic Church was constructed in several stages and incorporates the first permanent Roman Catholic church in Maryborough started in 1869 to a design of Charles Tiffin. The building was enlarged in two major stages of construction, the first in 1884–5 to the design of FDG Stanley and then in 1936 to the design of local architect, POE Hawkes.

The original township of Maryborough was situated, not in its current place, but on the north of the Mary River, after wharves were established in 1847–8 providing transport for wool from sheep stations on the Burnett River. In 1850 Surveyor, Hugh Roland Labatt arrived in Maryborough with instructions to "examine the River Mary...to suggest ...the best site or sites for the laying out of the town, having regard to the convenience of shipping on one hand and internal communication on the other...also...point out the spots desirable as reserves for public building, church, quay and for places for public recreation." The site recommended by Labatt was not where settlement was established but further east and from the early 1850s this is where the growing town developed. As part of the survey two acres of land, through which a creek ran, in Section 85 was set aside for the Roman Catholic Church.

To service the early Roman Catholic community in Maryborough, Father James Hanley from Brisbane, visited Maryborough and held baptismal services. The first service was held in August 1852 in the house of the local chief constable. Towards the end of the 1850s the town of Maryborough developed with the erection of several public buildings including churches, and in 1856 a decision was made by the Roman Catholic community to erect a timber building to house 300 people. The tender of Linklater and Thompson was accepted and the church was ready for use in 1858, though not on the reserved site which was subject to flooding. A new site had been donated to the church by James Cleary and this has remained the principal Roman Catholic church site in Maryborough. The timber building was erected principally as a school house, but used as a service centre when Hanley's replacement, Dean Rigby visited Maryborough.

After the separation of the State of Queensland in 1859, the Roman Catholic Church formed the Brisbane Diocese encompassing the entire state. Bishop James Quinn was appointed and he arrived in his diocese in 1861 and immediately made plans to visit the populated areas, including Maryborough. He arrived in the town on 25 July 1861 with two fellow priests, one of whom, Father Tissot, remained in Maryborough as the first parish priest.

By 1867 Father Tissot and his congregation considered the timber building inadequate as their church and steps were made to construct a new permanent church. It was in this year that gold was found in Gympie and the development of Maryborough, as the port of the gold fields, was rapid. The services of Brisbane architect, Charles Tiffin were procured to design the new brick church and the foundation stone was laid on 29 July 1869. Tiffin was a well known public architect who was appointed to the position of Clerk of Works of Moreton Bay in 1857 and in 1859 he became the first Queensland Colonial Architect and was responsible for the design of many well known Brisbane landmarks, including Old Government House, Parliament House and the (now demolished) Public Lands Office. He also designed several buildings in Maryborough including the Government Bond Store in Wharf Street and the Post Office.

St Mary's Roman Catholic Church, as it became known, was completed and opened at a service conducted by Father Tissot on 4 February 1872. The building was constructed by local contractors G Smith and J Thomas under the supervision of WN Davidson. When completed, the church was described as Early English and of brick with stone quoining and detailing. The building had a steeply pitched gabled roof clad with shingles. Side aisles extended the length of the four-bay nave and these were lined with double lancets. The plan incorporated a small porch, chancel and two sacristies. Father Tissot landscaped the grounds surrounding the church and provided the a chancel screen and other timber panelling carved by himself. He is thought to have been involved with the design of the high altar and the carved timber canopy, or baldacchino above the altar. Provision was made in the design for extension of the church at a later date.

On 21 November 1882, at a meeting presided over by the new bishop, Robert Dunne, a decision was made to extend St Mary's. The services of Colonial Architect, FDG Stanley were sought and plans for alterations were prepared and the church was re-opened in May 1884. The contractor for the work was Fritz Kinne at a cost of £1871. The additions included the extension of the nave by three bays and the erection of a large chancel. The roof was reclad with slate and several ventilation gablets were added near the ridge. Internally the church was painted by Messrs O'Malley and Mill. A new set of Stations of the Cross from Lyons, described as oleographs or coloured lithographs printed with oil paints, were framed in gold.

During the nineteenth century the Roman Catholic Church in Maryborough continued to grow with several outbranches of the parish established in surrounding areas. A large presbytery, convent and school were constructed. In 1912 a new organ and blower, costing £900, were installed in the gallery of St Mary's.

Substantial alterations were made at St Mary's in 1936 to the design of innovative local architect, P.O.E. Hawkes and carried out by contractor, Herbert Neilson for £7000. Again, the length of the building was extended, north and south chancels were added, as were sacristies, confessionals and a baptistry. The organ was moved from the gallery and placed in the Sacred Heart transept. Externally, the building was rendered and an entrance was formed from Adelaide Street, where previously access was provided only from Bazaar Street. A marble high altar was made by local craftsman, Mr Prout. A cock was added to the western gable of the church reflecting the French ties of Monsignor MacCarthy, the then parish priest. Cocks were traditionally added to the roofs of French churches to symbolise resentment over Italian dominance of the papacy.

Minor alterations have been made to the church since 1936, including the recladding of the roof with tiles and rib and pan roofing in two stages in 1959 and 1967. A section of the timber floor of the body of the church was replaced with concrete in 1979, followed by work in 1980 to stabilise foundations in the north western corner. A porch was constructed on the northern transept in 1987 and the timber canopy over the high altar was removed in 1989.

== Description ==
St Mary's Church is centrally located in metropolitan Maryborough. The complex comprises the stuccoed masonry church, stone and concrete grotto, and two modern steel and canvas shelters.

The nave of St Mary's runs north west/south east on the block between Adelaide and Bazaar Streets with pedestrian access provided from both of these streets. The principal entrance to the complex is via Adelaide Street, at which end is the entrance of the church, with the chancel end of the building, and transepts at the Bazaar Street end. The building has a steeply pitched gabled roof, and with gothic accoutrements and essentially cruciform plan formed by the long nave and intersecting transepts, the building conforms with many of the ideals of gothic ecclesiastical architecture.

The principal facade of the building comprises the centrally located gable end of the building, abutted to the north east by a smaller gabled section surmounted by a small plaster statue of a rooster. On the face of the main gabled bay is a centrally located entrance formed by a gabled porch, surmounted by a statue of Our Lady and flanked by plaster moulded pinnacles. Above this is a large traceried stained glass window of five lancets with foils above. The roof is concealed by a moulded string coursed parapet which encircles the building. Surmounting this parapet on the central gable of the front of the building is a Latin Cross.

St Mary's Church has a seven bay nave, defined by internal columns supporting a nave arcade of pointed arched openings above which are small quatrefoil opening within triangular recesses forming the clerestory of the building. Around the altar the order of architecture changes to classical and, as a continuation of the nave arcade, Corinthian columns support an entablature to create the chancel space. On the entablature are painted, in relief lettering, several religions phrases in Latin, and this writing continues around the cornice line of the transepts at this end of the building. In one of the transepts is a large organ.

== Heritage listing ==
St Marys Roman Catholic Church was listed on the Queensland Heritage Register on 21 October 1992 having satisfied the following criteria.

The place is important in demonstrating the evolution or pattern of Queensland's history.

St Mary's Church the principal Roman Catholic Church in Maryborough illustrates the growth of the town from a small port to a large regional city. The church demonstrates the development of the catholic church in regional Queensland, from the establishment of centres in major regional towns in the mid nineteenth century to upgrading facilities during the late nineteenth and early twentieth centuries.

The place is important in demonstrating the principal characteristics of a particular class of cultural places.

The building is a characteristic example of a large regional Roman Catholic Church, with substantial sections dating from the nineteenth century and sympathetic early twentieth century additions.

The place is important because of its aesthetic significance.

St Mary's has aesthetic and architectural merit as the work of a group of talented architects, forming a well composed building on a prominent Maryborough site. The building features fine craftsmanship, particularly the marble high altar, stained glass windows, Stations of the Cross and joinery.

The place has a strong or special association with a particular community or cultural group for social, cultural or spiritual reasons.

The building has important spiritual associations with the Roman Catholic community in Maryborough as their place of public worship for 125 years and has association with many of the parish priests who were responsible for adding to or altering the building.

The place has a special association with the life or work of a particular person, group or organisation of importance in Queensland's history.

The building has associations with architects, Charles Tiffin and FDG Stanley and with POE Hawkes, an innovative Maryborough architect.

== Historic events ==
Bishop James Quinn arrived in the diocese in 1861. Bishop Quinn began his first visit of the diocese accompanied by Father Renehan and Father Tissot, who also had recently arrived. They left Brisbane on the steamer Clarence on 23 July 1861, and two days later arrived in Maryborough. Fr. Tissot remained in Maryborough and became its first resident priest.

- 1852: First Mass in Maryborough.
- 1852: Home of Sergeant (constable) William McAdam, at Baddow.
- 1858: Wooden church/school. A school house was built on the present presbytery site in early 1858. Mass was celebrated here when priests visited.
- On 15 July 18, it transferred from James Cleary to Arch Quinn.
- On 29 July 1869, the foundation stone for the new church was laid.
- Between 1869 and 1872 the church was built.
- From 6 July 1870 to April 1880, the parish school was in the care of the Sisters of St. Joseph.
- On 4 February 1872, St. Mary's church was completed and blessed by Bishop Quinn. The architect was Charles Tiffin.
- On 26 April 1872, the church's benefactor James Cleary died at age 78. Cleary was buried in St Mary's church. The land was donated by himself.
- On Saturday 10 July 1875, Fr. Tissot departed for Brisbane en route to France. He died in the Paris on 16 February 1895.
- On 24 February 1878 the Sacred Heart church Tiaro opened.
- Suddenly Thomas O'Brien died, while going to Bundaberg on Wednesday 12 June 1878.
- From 1878 to 1879, Fr. Hanley administered the parish until was suddenly transferred to Bundaberg parish causing the parishioners to become upset.

=== 1880s ===
- In April 1880, the Sisters of St Joseph departed. The school was closed for a short time in between the two orders leaving and arriving.
- Thursday 1 April 1880 – Sisters of Mercy arrive.
- Between 1884 and 1885, St Mary's was extended. The architect was F. D. G. Stanley.
- The extensions were blessed 10 May 1885 by Bishop Dunne.
- In May 1887, plans were drawn for the first presbytery.
- On Sunday, 2 September 1888, Archbishop Duhig blessed and opened the Christian Brothers school. This school was amalgamated in 1979 with the Mercy Sisters' girls' secondary school to form the new "St Mary's College".
- In 1888, the parish established a secondary boys school, inviting the Christian brothers to staff the college on its present site in 1888. (In 1979 the college became co-educational by the amalgamation with the Sisters of Mercy's St. Mary's high school for girls established on the site now occupied by St. Mary's primary.

=== 1890s ===
- In 1892, a new convent was built and blessed Sunday 27 August 1893.
- In 1898, Fr. Reilly transferred to Brisbane. He died on 4 February 1904 at the age of 63.

=== 1910s ===
- In 1912, the organ was installed at a cost of £900.

=== 1920s ===
- Fr. Brady died on 21 June 1922 at the age of 62.

=== 1930s to present ===
- On 22 March 1936, a second extension was added to the parish. The work included relocating the entrance to Adelaide St and adding a chancel. The architect was P. O. E. Hawkes and construction was carried out by H. G. Neilsen. After its completion on Sunday 29 November 1936, it was blessed by Bishop James Duhig.
- In 1936 a large stained glass window designed by William Bustard (1894–1973) and created by RS Exton and Co of Brisbane, was donated by the Corser brothers.
- The stained glass window above the high altar was donated by Mr. Stellmach.
- In 1958 Aramara became part of the parish. The church in Aramara was built, blessed and opened in 1950. It was the only church in the parish with a spire.
- In 1972 it was decided that a new presbytery and hall were to be built. The work was carried out the following year and was blessed on 21 October 1973 by Arch Rush. Lyons who retired in May 1978.
- In 1977 the wooden flooring was replaced with concrete.
- Between 1989 and 1991, the organ underwent a full restoration.
- On 4 August 1991 it was rededicated.
- On 9 February 1993 the church was restored by Bellero Constructions with architectural designs by Hurst and Harris Pty Ltd.
- In 1994 the church was declared a heritage building.
- On 24 May 2000 a jubilee wall hanging was unveiled with a cabinet crafted by Brian White and his sons, Chris and Lucas. The cabinet was funded by the Gambling Community Benefit Fund.

=== Parish priests ===
- 1861–1875: Fr. Paul Tissot. He was born in Lyon, France, 1801.
- 1875–1878: Fr. Thomas O'Brien.
- 1879–1898: Fr. John O'Reilly.
- 1898–1922: Fr. Phillip Brady. Previously Fr. Brady had been assistant priest.
- 1922–1925: Fr. Patrick Brady. He was Fr. Phillip Brady's brother. He moved to Brisbane in 1925 and died in 1951.
- 1926–1941: Dean John Francis McCarthy (later Monsignor McCarthy).
- 1941–1957: Fr. Martin Jordan. He died on 17 April 1957. The grotto erected in 1951 was in memory of his nephew, who was killed in active service of the USA in Korea.
- 1957–1978: Fr. Robert Lyons (later Monsignor).
- 1978–1989: Fr. Guilford Lyons.
- 1989–2002: Fr. Harry Bliss.
- 2002–2005: Fr. Anthony Mellor.
- 2005–present: Fr. Paul Kelly.
