= Goomeri Hall of Memory =

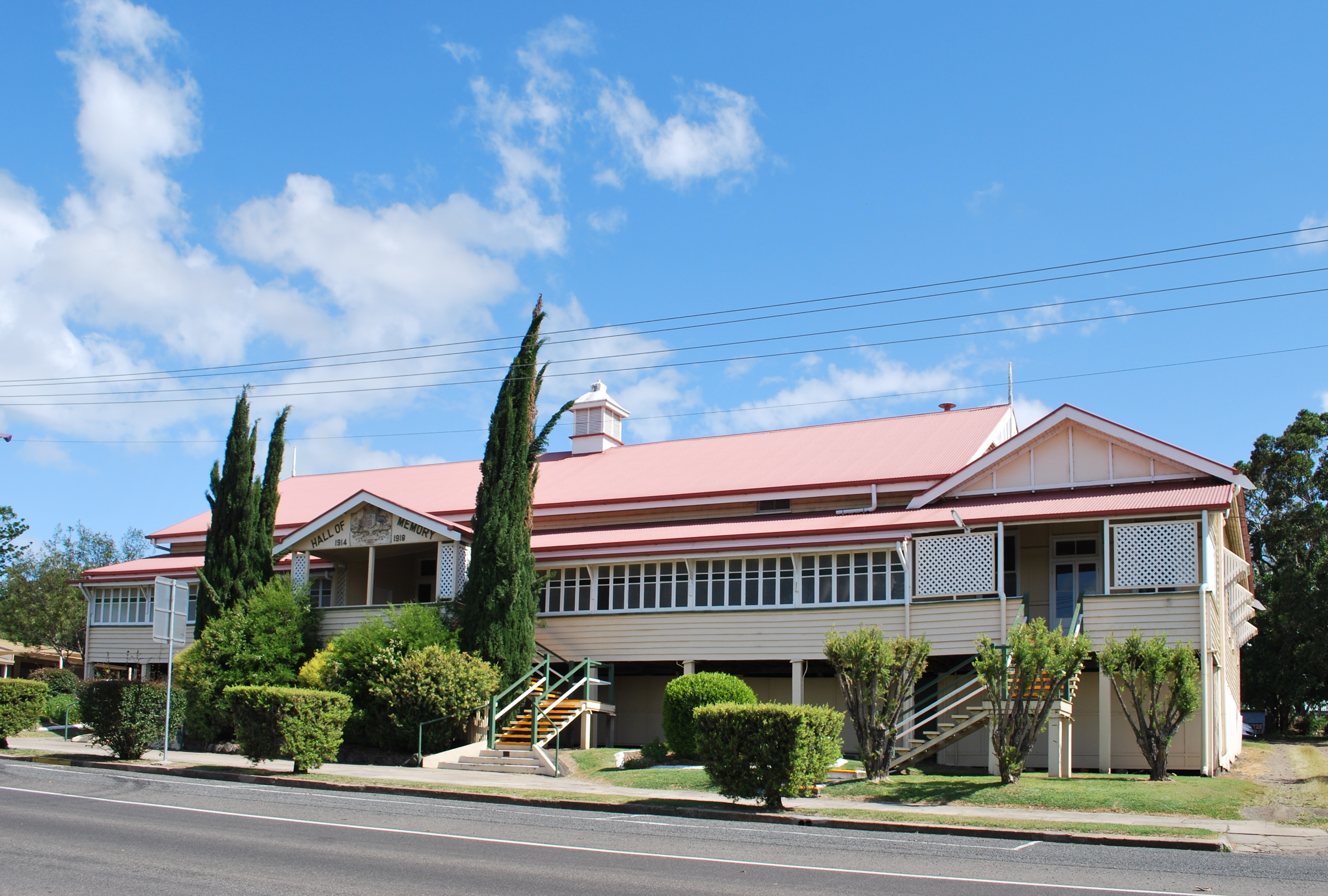
- Goomeri Hall of Memory, 2010

- Location within Queensland Location within Australia
- 26.1831°S 152.0702°E
- Location: Boonara Street, Goomeri, Gympie Region, Queensland, Australia

History
- Design period: 1919–1930s (interwar period)
- Built: 1926

Site notes
- Architect: Philip Oliver Ellard Hawkes

Queensland Heritage Register
- Official name: Goomeri Hall of Memory
- Type: state heritage (built)
- Designated: 21 October 1992
- Reference no.: 600641
- Significant period: 1926– (social); 1926–1971 (historical); 1926–1951 (fabric)
- Significant components: roof/ridge ventilator/s / fleche/s, memorial – hall

Goomeri Hall of Memory is a heritage-listed war memorial hall at Boonara Street, Goomeri, Gympie Region, Queensland, Australia. It was built in 1926 and designed by Philip Oliver Ellard Hawkes. It was added to the Queensland Heritage Register on 21 October 1992.

== History ==
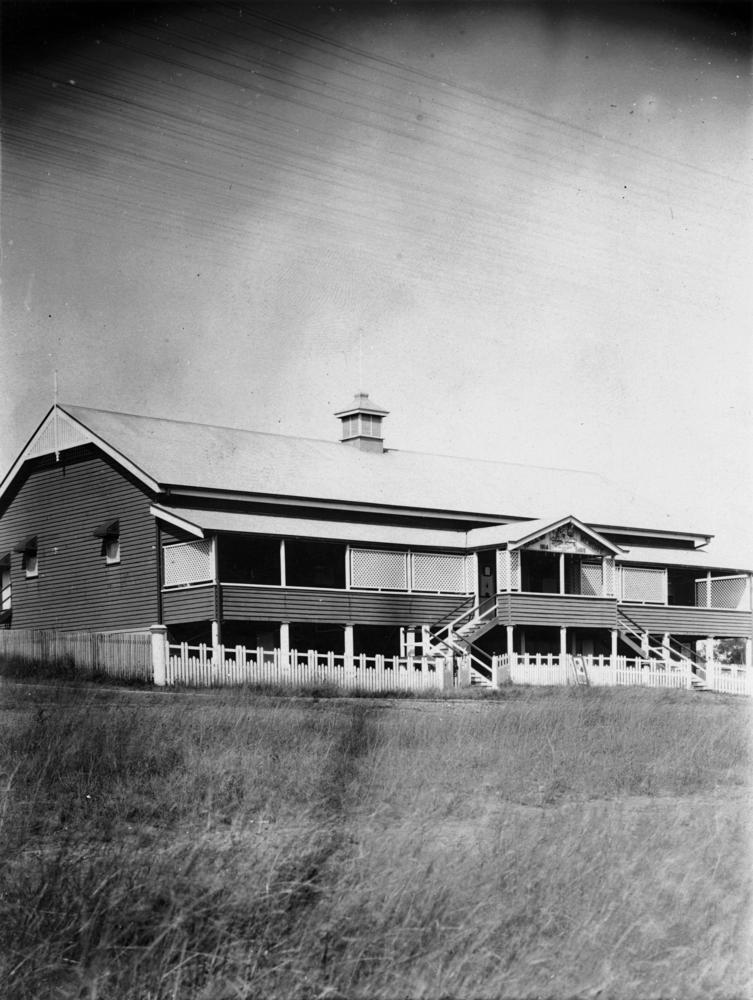
Hall of Memory, Goomeri, 1930

The Hall of Memory at Goomeri was opened in 1926 to commemorate all those from the district who had served in World War I. This dedication has since been extended to also honour all those who have served in subsequent wars.

European settlement in the district took place in 1843–50 as large pastoral holdings were taken up. By 1870 these had been subdivided into smaller grazing farms. In 1902, the Nanango railway line reached Goomeri and at that time was used principally by local farmers and to transport timber. In 1911, a sale of town commercial and residential blocks was held. More farms were established and a butter factory was built. The town of Goomeri developed with a school, showground and churches as a rural district centre in the 1930s.

The First World War (1914–1918), although fought in Europe, North Africa and the Middle East, had a profound impact on Australia. At the outbreak of war Australia, settled as a British colony and with strong ties to the "motherland", immediately entered the war in support of Britain and her allies. Over 300,000 Australians out of a population of 4 million volunteered for service overseas, with approximately 60,000 of these making the supreme sacrifice. Virtually every Australian community, including that of Goomeri, lost young men in this war.

Following the war, most communities wished to erect a memorial for those who served, and particularly those who had not returned. At Goomeri, a memorial was erected in Digger Perrett Park, although the Goomeri War Memorial Clock, which stands opposite the site, replaced this in 1940. The Goomeri sub-branch of the RSL received its charter on 1 January 1926 and members of this branch were a driving force behind the establishment of the Hall of Memory. A public meeting was held in March 1926 and a Memorial Hall Building Committee comprising Messrs. Mayne, Stanton, Wimberley, Maudsley and Wise was appointed with authority to obtain land and a building for use as a community hall. At the time, this was not a common form of memorial, most tributes to Queensland volunteers and war dead being monuments. It was not until the wake of World War II that such practical memorials as buildings and community facilities were favoured, so that the Goomeri Hall of Memory is one of only a small number of such buildings remaining.

The building committee purchased an existing timber store building from Cuthbert Butt at Nanango and A Kopp and W Toop had erected it on the site by May 1926. A crow's ash floor was laid for dancing and the hall was painted. It was initially leased to a Mr A Rich, who moved his silent picture show there from Boonara. Mrs Rich had a sweet stall under the hall, which appears to have been enclosed soon after the relocation. Funds to clear the debt and cover the purchase of furniture, crockery and other essential items were raised by holding a series of events from 1927. These included a concert and ball, a sports day and procession and a popular girl competition, won by Myrtle Wieland who was also one of the cinema pianists. These events were announced to have cleared the debt of £844 at Easter 1929 with a surplus of just £1/3/6.

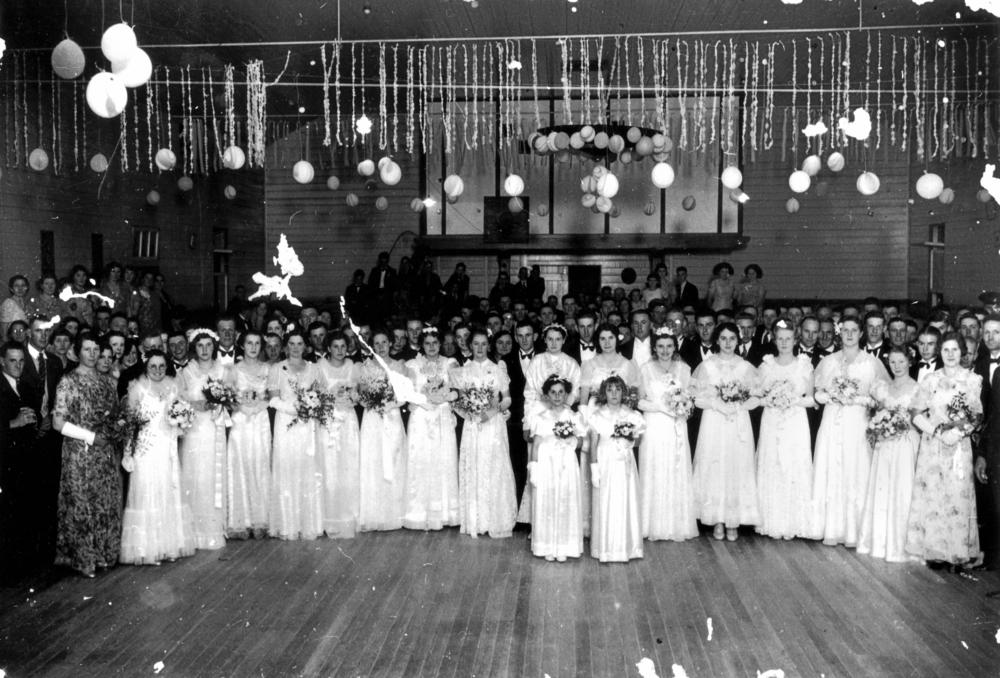
Debutantes Ball at the Hall of Memory, 1930s

In 1931 a large supper room with a kitchen was added. This room was also used for meetings and small functions. In 1935 sections of wall were removed between the hall and the enclosed verandahs to increase available space.

Mr A Duffy held a long lease on the hall to show films. He also acted as caretaker and installed electricity and equipment to show "talkies". In the 1940s he became one of the first operators in the country to install CinemaScope.

During the Second World War, the basement area was used to store 600 long tons (610 t) of emergency supplies for the area in case of Japanese invasion. Following the war these were removed and the area was partitioned as clubrooms for the RSL. The Citizen's Military Forces also used the RSL space as a drill room and the grounds of the hall for parades.

World War II memorials to match those for WWI were ordered in 1950 from Smiths Rubber Stamp, Brass Plate and Stencil Manufacturing Coy in Brisbane for the sum of 7 guineas each. Murray Studios in Gympie supplied the photographs and the memorials were unveiled on Anzac Day 1951.

In the 1950s, the demand for film shows fell. Films were shown only once a week and were eventually discontinued in the late 1950s, although the hall continued to be used for other events. In 1971, the Kilkivan Shire Council accepted responsibility for the hall at the Trustee's request. Following this, the kitchens were modernised and a bar and cold room installed at the supper room end of the hall. The RSL kitchenette was modernised in 1991 and it is thought that the hall was re-roofed in 1995. The hall is still in regular use for a wide range of entertainments and social functions.

== Description ==
The Hall of Memory is a high set timber building with a corrugated iron roof, which is prominently sited on Boonara Street, at the corner of McGregor Street, Goomeri. It is set in well-tended gardens and comprises a rectangular hall with a gabled roof and a smaller gabled addition set at one end. To the rear, toilet blocks are connected to the hall and it has been built in underneath to form a basement storey.

The main hall is a long rectangular building with its long axis presented to the street elevation. Along this elevation is an enclosed verandah and central gabled porch entry flanked by stairs. On the porch gable is the Commonwealth coat of arms surmounted by the words "Hall of Memory 1914 – 1918". A decorative timber ventilator surmounts the main roof. Attached to one side of the hall is the smaller separately roofed building which has a front verandah and separate stair entry.

The main hall is lined with beaded boards and has a timber ceiling and floor. One end has a stage with a curved front and a space for a piano to one side. The rear of the room has a modern bar with a projection box over. The access stair to be projection box has been removed to accommodate a steel cold room. Behind the bar is a large supper room leading into kitchens. There is a large kitchen range in the smaller room to the rear, although a modern cooking stove and kitchen cabinets have been installed in the larger room.

Inside the main room of the hall are a number of memorials. These include a modern timber roll of honour for Goomeri and District; timber-framed metal honour rolls for World War I and 21 individual memorials in the form of decorative bronze plaques with an inset photograph of those honoured. Nine are for the First World War and twelve for World War II. There is also a benefactors' memorial in the form of an open metallic book on a marble plaque. It reads: In grateful memory of John T Mayne a patriotic benefactor and Mary Mayne his wife and partner in benevolence.

The verandah along the front of the hall has been built in with casement windows glazed with obscure and green glass. There are large openings from the hall into them forming two long rooms. The central porch contains a ticket box accessed by a door in the hall and flanked by pairs of entry doors into the hall.

The basement area has been built in and has high, narrow windows. The toilet block on the corner is constructed of fibrous cement planks on a base of concrete blocks and has a skillion roof and sliding aluminium windows.

== Heritage listing ==
Goomeri Hall of Memory was listed on the Queensland Heritage Register on 21 October 1992 having satisfied the following criteria.

The place is important in demonstrating the evolution or pattern of Queensland's history.

The Goomeri Hall of Memory is important is demonstrating the pattern and evolution of Queensland's history, as a memorial to the participation, and loss of, members of the Goomeri and district community in the First World War and later wars. Construction of the hall is also illustrative of the patriotic fervour associated with the First World War, and the community's identification with the British Empire at this period in Queensland's history.

The place demonstrates rare, uncommon or endangered aspects of Queensland's cultural heritage.

As a memorial hall it forms part of a relatively rare type of First World War memorial in Queensland, being a building for both memorial and recreational use, rather than the more common monumental memorial.

The place is important in demonstrating the principal characteristics of a particular class of cultural places.

The Goomeri Hall of Memory demonstrates the principal characteristics of a building designed for the use, both recreational and administrative, of returned soldiers and their families, with its honour rolls, meeting rooms, supper room, and dance hall. The large hall remains important in demonstrating the principal characteristics of its type, with a timber floor laid especially for dancing, a stage, supper room and large banks of windows to the street elevation.

The place is important because of its aesthetic significance.

The Hall of Memory has landmark qualities as a large and well-detailed building on a prominent elevated site and makes a major contribution to the character of the townscape of Goomeri.

The place has a strong or special association with a particular community or cultural group for social, cultural or spiritual reasons.

The Goomeri Hall of Memory has a spiritual and social association with the Returned Services League as both a war memorial and a meeting place. It also has a special association with community of Goomeri and district because of its long use for many social functions, including balls, concerts and the showing of films.
