= Carroll Cottage =

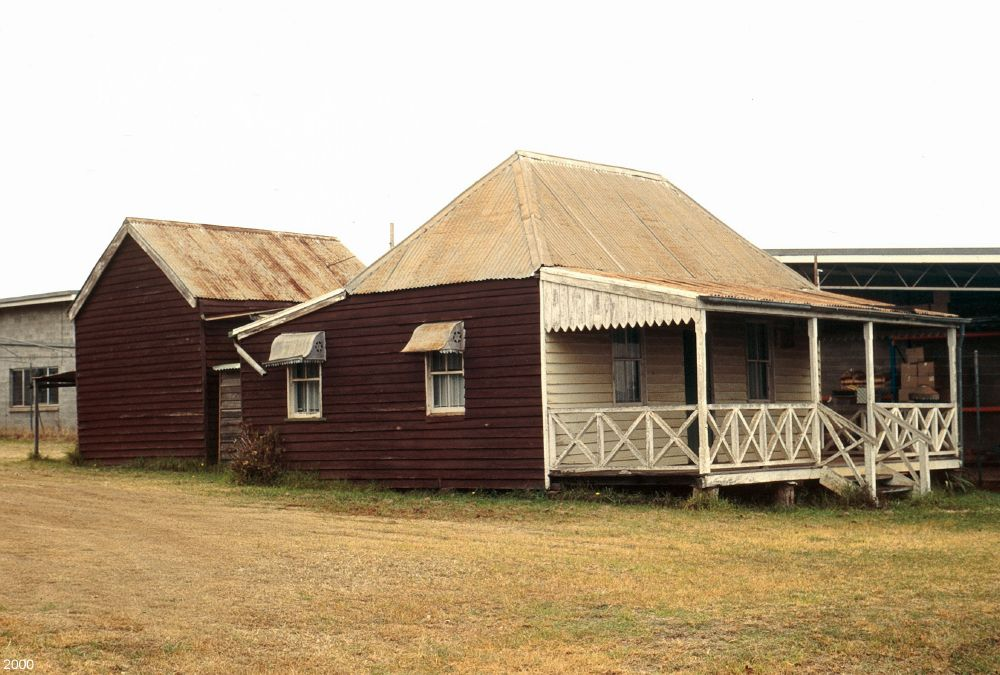
- Carroll Cottage, 2000

- Location within Queensland Location within Australia
- 26.5384°S 151.8417°E
- Location: 6 Edward Street, Kingaroy, South Burnett Region, Queensland, Australia

History
- Design period: 1900–1914 (early 20th century)
- Built: 1900–1930s

Queensland Heritage Register
- Official name: Carroll Cottage, Daniel Carroll's House
- Type: state heritage (built)
- Designated: 28 July 2000
- Reference no.: 601901
- Significant period: 1900s–1930s (fabric); 1900–1910 (historical)
- Significant components: residential accommodation – main house, kitchen/kitchen house, furniture/fittings

Carroll Cottage is a heritage-listed cottage at 6 Edward Street, Kingaroy, South Burnett Region, Queensland, Australia. It was built from 1900 to 1930s. It is also known as Daniel Carroll's House. It was added to the Queensland Heritage Register on 28 July 2000.

== History ==
Daniel Carroll's House is a small timber residence constructed in 1900 on a selection owned by Daniel Carroll. Carroll was an early settler of the district, part of a wave of selectors who took up land in the area from the 1880s onwards, and his cottage was the nucleus of a small settlement that was to become the town of Kingaroy. Significant pastoral expansion took place in southern Queensland commencing in 1840 when extensive tracts of land were taken up on the Darling Downs, Brisbane Valley and Logan River area in 1840 and 1841. The first large properties of the Burnett district, Tarong and Nanango, were taken up in 1842.

For about 40 years, these large pastoral holdings survived substantially intact and their dominance suppressed the need for service towns. However, the Lands Act of 1868 caused dramatic changes to rural areas and large portions of these leases were resumed for selection purposes. The result was the closer settlement of smaller selections, which consequently enabled the establishment of rural communities and created a need for service towns and public facilities. The first notable selection in the area was that of the Markwell brothers, who applied for 2,156 hectares (5,330 acres) of land in 1878. It was located on the Stuart River and Kingaroy Creek and became known as the Kingaroy Paddock, ultimately giving its name to the area.

In 1891, Daniel Carroll selected portion 107V, a 160-acre (65 ha) block abutting the Kingaroy Paddock. Carroll had arrived from Ireland at the age of twenty in 1887 and spent some years in the area working as a coach driver. In 1898, it was reported that Carroll was the only European living in the vicinity of the current site of Kingaroy and that he had built a hut for himself and a yard for his horses nearby. In 1900, in anticipation of his forthcoming marriage to Bridget Pender, Carroll had the present cottage built, by a Mr Ferdinand Seng. By this time, Carroll had selected further blocks of land adjoining portion 107V.

To facilitate the transport of timber and other produce of developing agricultural industries in the district, the Kilkivan branch railway was extended to Wondai in 1903 and to the "56 mile peg" in 1904. The 56-mile (90 km) peg was near the corner of the Kingaroy Paddock. The termination of the railway line at the peg was the impetus for the establishment of the town of Kingaroy. Daniel Carroll and Arthur Youngman (owner of Taabinga station) sold town blocks at public auction in 1903–04. When the first train arrived on 19 December 1904, the Carroll Cottage was one of only three buildings at the termination site. The others being Carroll's new hotel, The Carrollee (burnt down in 1913) and F C Petersen's recently completed store. The official banquet for the opening of the railway was held in Carroll's horse paddock.

After the extension of the railway, the establishment of commercial premises such as shops and hotels were soon followed by public offices, churches and schools. The seven years that the town served as railhead were sufficient to secure its growth beyond neighbouring centres and establish a lasting dominance. Daniel Carroll continued to be involved with the development of Kingaroy through his property interests and as a member of a variety of committees for public facilities. He donated a building site from his original block for St. Mary's, the first Catholic Church in Kingaroy and also donated land for the hospital. The Carroll family moved into a new home in Albert Street in 1910, but retained possession of the cottage, which was rented out. The property is still owned by members of the Carroll family, with the Kingaroy Historical Society as caretakers. It is furnished and interpreted to the early Interwar period and is open by appointment as a house museum.

== Description ==
Daniel Carroll's House is located on a small block of land in Edward Street in the town of Kingaroy. The house is a four room cottage with several accretions. The cottage is a small, single storey timber dwelling, low-set on short timber stumps with a short, centrally located entry stair. The area of the house that accommodates the front two rooms has a steep hipped roof without eaves that is clad in corrugated iron and the back two rooms have a simple lean-to roof. A verandah runs across the front of the house with a recent cross braced balustrade replacing an earlier dowel balustrade. The cottage is clad externally in weatherboards and has ogee-profile steel window hoods surmounting the windows, which are double hung timber sashes.

The detached kitchen is located at the back of the house, connected by a raised, covered walkway that has been enclosed in horizontal, corrugated iron sheeting. On the western side this area is abutted by a bathroom also sheeted in corrugated iron. The kitchen is a simple rectilinear building with a pitched roof. It is clad in weatherboards and has been extended with a small open, lean-to at the back which is used for timber storage. The cottage is lined internally with beaded, tongue and groove timber boarding and has three bedrooms and a parlour. The kitchen is lined with fibro cement sheeting.

== Heritage listing ==
Carroll Cottage was listed on the Queensland Heritage Register on 28 July 2000 having satisfied the following criteria.

The place is important in demonstrating the evolution or pattern of Queensland's history.

Daniel Carroll's House is important in demonstrating the evolution and pattern of Queensland's history, reflecting the housing and living conditions of early settlers in rural districts. As the earliest dwelling to be constructed in Kingaroy, Daniel Carroll's House demonstrates the growth of the town from a rural selection to a thriving town around a railhead and later a regional administrative and commercial centre. Constructed in 1900, the house is conspicuous amongst surrounding Interwar homes as being of an earlier period and contributes to an understanding of how the town developed.

The place is important in demonstrating the principal characteristics of a particular class of cultural places.

Daniel Carroll's House demonstrates the principal characteristics of a small, timber residence constructed in a then remote rural district. Key features include the simple rectilinear form of the building, steep, hipped roof, basic four-roomed plan and detached kitchen. The house provides a good illustration of the way in which houses have traditionally been extended in Queensland.

The place is important because of its aesthetic significance.

Daniel Carroll's House has aesthetic significance derived from its simple design, diminutive scale, cottage-like form and unrefined use of materials. It is largely intact and its current use as a house museum has the ability to evoke an impression of the lives of early residents and other times.

The place has a strong or special association with a particular community or cultural group for social, cultural or spiritual reasons.

Daniel Carroll's House has strong social value to the Kingaroy community, both as the earliest house in the settlement on its original site and also as part of a community museum complex maintained by the local historical society.

The place has a special association with the life or work of a particular person, group or organisation of importance in Queensland's history.

The house has a special association with Daniel Carroll, a key figure in the establishment of Kingaroy.
