= Shire of Woocoo =

Coordinates: 25°30′36.9″S 152°38′40.34″E

- Local government area
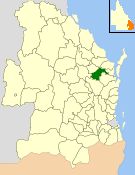
- Location within Queensland

- Country: Australia
- State: Queensland
- Region: Wide Bay–Burnett
- Established: 1914
- Council seat: Oakhurst

Area
  - Total: 2,007.9 km^{2} (775.3 sq mi)

Population
  - Total: 3,351 (2006 census)
  - Density: 1.66891/km^{2} (4.3225/sq mi)
- Website: Shire of Woocoo
LGAs around Shire of Woocoo
Biggenden	Isis	Hervey Bay
Gayndah	Shire of Woocoo	Maryborough
Kilkivan	Kilkivan	Tiaro

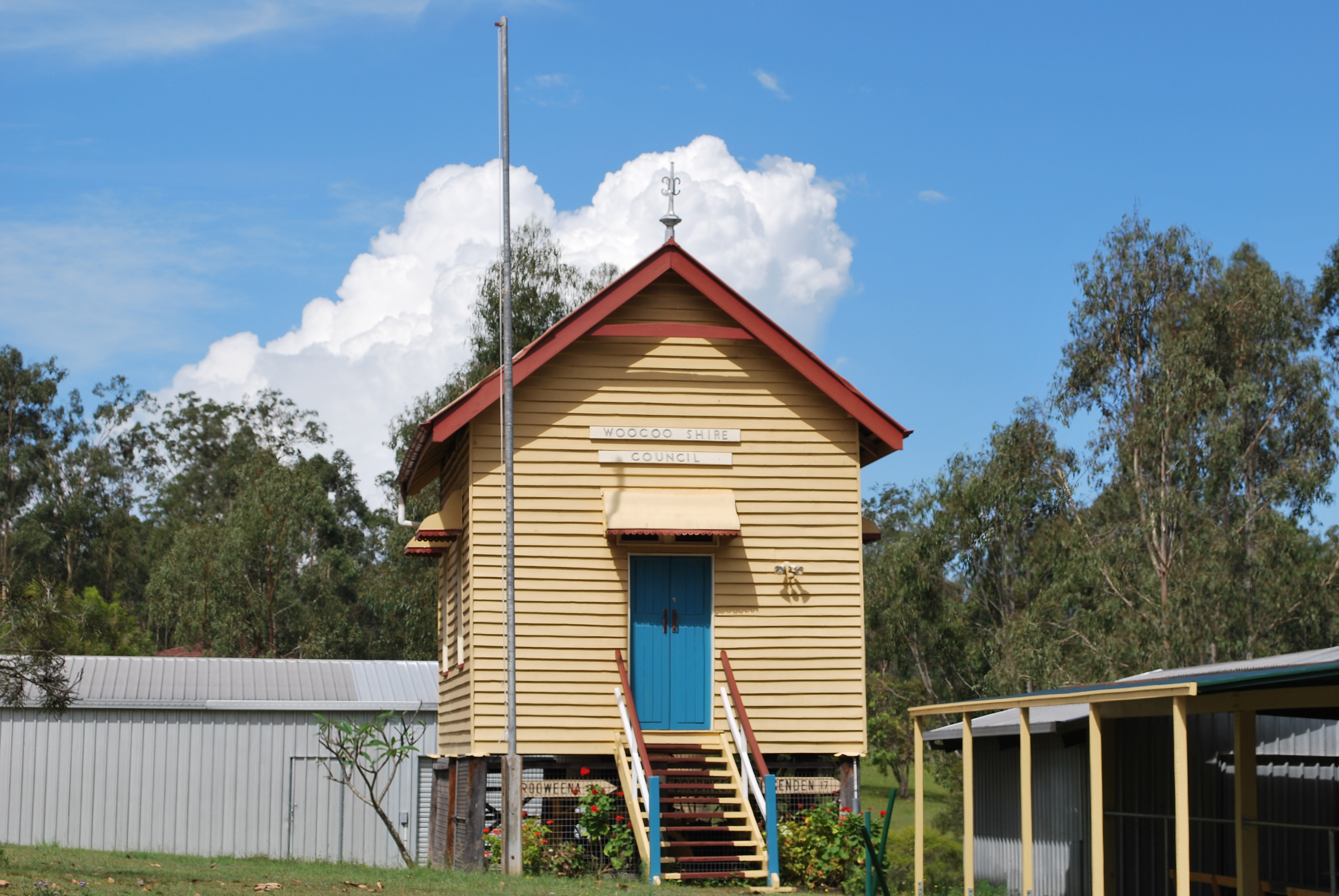
Historic shire chambers

The Shire of Woocoo was a local government area located in the Wide Bay–Burnett region of Queensland, Australia, containing the rural residential area to the west of the town of Maryborough, and surrounding countryside. The shire covered an area of 2,007.9 square kilometres (775.3 sq mi), and existed as a local government entity from 1914 until 2008, when it was amalgamated with the City of Maryborough, City of Hervey Bay and the 1st and 2nd divisions of the Shire of Tiaro to form the Fraser Coast Region.

Industry in the shire consisted of beef cattle, sugar, timber and light industry servicing Maryborough.

== History ==
Woocoo was proclaimed a shire under the Local Authorities Act 1902 on 4 December 1914, with its centre of administration at Brooweena. The area covered by the shire consisted of areas which had previously been parts of Antigua, Howard and Tiaro Shires. The shire was named for Mount Woocoo, which itself was probably named for the local Aboriginal word for "echidna". It held its first meeting on 30 January 1915.

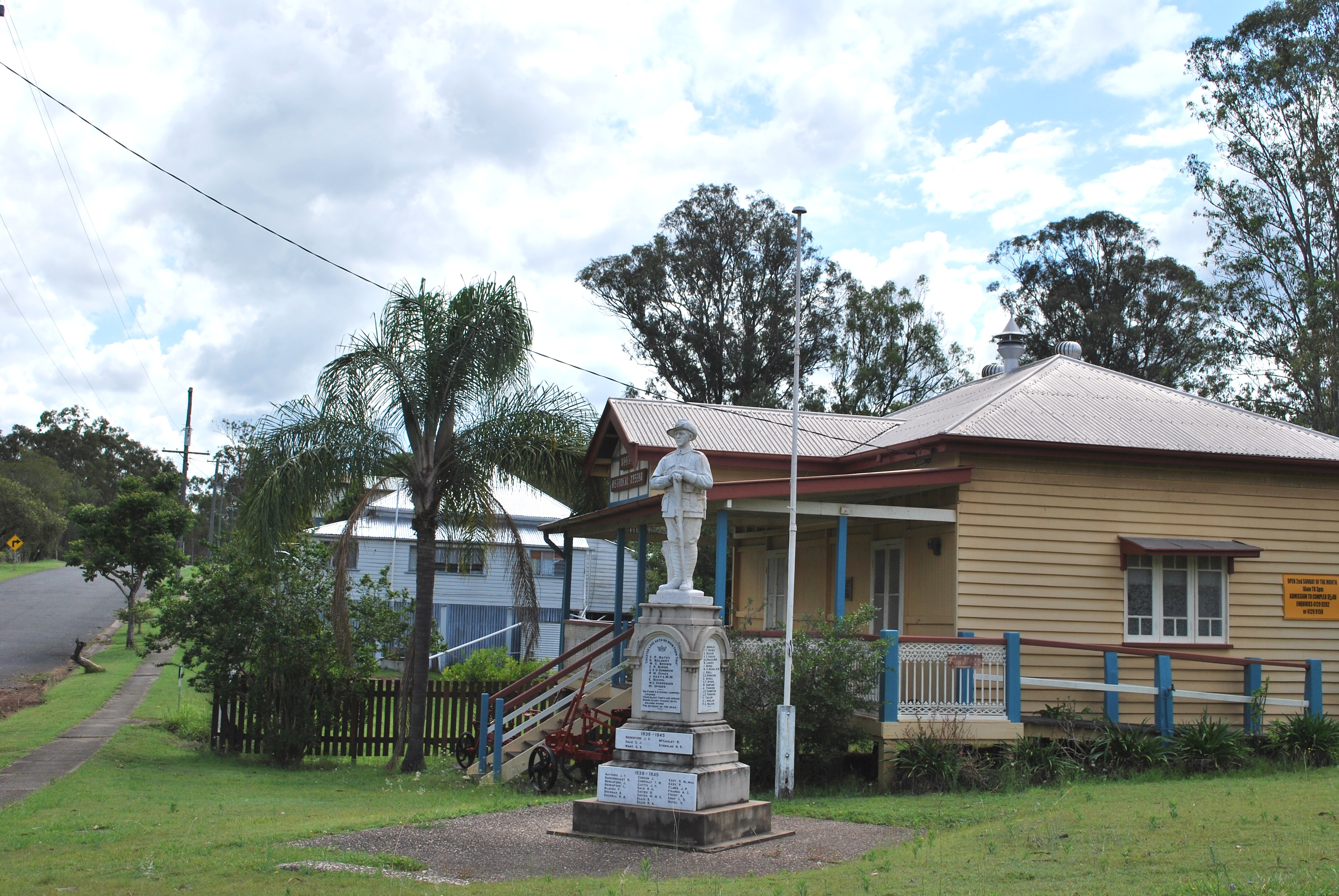
Brooweena War Memorial, 2008

In 1922, the residents of the Woocoo Shire erected a war memorial outside St Mary's Church of England on the Maryborough-Biggenden Road in Teebar (now within Boompa). The Woocoo Shire War Memorial was unveiled on Saturday 6 January 1923 by Major-General Thomas William Glasgow. In 1992 the memorial was relocated to the Woocoo Historical Museum in Brooweena due to concerns about vandalism and is now known as the Brooweena War Memorial.

On 27 March 1976, the Shire of Woocoo grew by 1,269.00 square kilometres (489.96 sq mi) when the Shire of Burrum was renamed Shire of Hervey Bay and recast as a local government area centred on the Hervey Bay urban area, with the non-coastal part of Burrum Shire being transferred to Maryborough and Woocoo.

On 31 March 1994 the Local Government (Maryborough and Woocoo) Regulation 1993 took effect, resulting in Maryborough's annexation of about 700 square kilometres (270 sq mi) of Woocoo's area. At this time, Woocoo was resubdivided into three divisions each electing two councillors.

On 15 March 2008, under the Local Government (Reform Implementation) Act 2007 passed by the Parliament of Queensland on 10 August 2007, Woocoo merged with the City of Hervey Bay, City of Maryborough and part of Tiaro Shire to form the Fraser Coast Region.

== Towns and localities ==
The Shire of Woocoo included the following settlements:

- Antigua
- Aramara
- Bidwill
- Boompa
- Brooweena
- Dunmora
- Grahams Creek
- Mungar
- Oakhurst
- Owanyilla
- Tinana South
- Woocoo
- Yengarie

== Population ==
Year	Population
1933	777
1947	750
1954	660
1961	640
1966	567
1971	491^{[1]}
1976	3,412
1981	4,456
1986	2,700
1991	3,429^{[2]}
1996	2,902
2001	2,964
2006	3,351

- ^{1} The population for the 1976 boundaries was 2,938.
- ^{2} The 1991 census population of the revised Woocoo area was 2,562.

== Chairmen and mayors ==
- 1915–1916: George Smyth Mant
- 1917: Laurence Stevens Smith
- 1918: J. Bourke
- 1919–1926: George Smyth Mant
- 1927–1929: W C Mathison [Maryborough Chronicle received from State Library of Queensland ref. ASK65230 rec'd 11/07/2019]
- 1930–1935: George Smyth Mant [information in the Maryborough Chronicle received from State Library of Queensland ref. ASK65230 rec'd 11/07/2019]
- 1936–1948: J C "Cliff" Irons [information in the Maryborough Chronicle received from State Library of Queensland ref. ASK65230 rec'd 11/07/2019]
- 1949–1955: Charles Ronald Sutton "Ron" Smith[information in the Maryborough Chronicle received from State Library of Queensland (also personal family history - my uncle)]
- 1955–1959: ????
- 1960: L.L. "Len" Harvey

1961–1973: Charles Ronald Sutton "Ron" Smith[article in the Maryborough Chronicle early 1973 (also personal family history - my uncle)]

- 1973–1988: ????
- 1988–1992: David Braddock
- 1992–2000: ????
- 2000–2007: Kevin Mahoney
- 2007: Iain Lewis (Acting)
- 2007–2008: Gloria Banting
