= Thinoomba =

- Suburb
- Interactive map of Thinoomba
- Coordinates: 25.5916°S 152.4680°E
- Country: Australia
- State: Queensland
- LGA: Fraser Coast Region
- Location: 31.8 km (19.8 mi) WSW of Maryborough; 60.8 km (37.8 mi) SW of Hervey Bay; 260 km (160 mi) N of Brisbane

Government
  - State electorate: Maryborough
  - Federal division: Wide Bay

Area
  - Total: 74.6 km^{2} (28.8 sq mi)

Population
  - Total: 16 (2021 census)
  - Density: 0.214/km^{2} (0.555/sq mi)
- Time zone: UTC+10:00 (AEST)
- Postcode: 4650
Suburbs around Thinoomba
Gungaloon	Gungaloon	Dunmora
Aramara	Thinoomba	Yerra
Woocoo	St Mary	Yerra

Thinoomba is a rural locality in the Fraser Coast Region, Queensland, Australia. In the 2021 census, Thinoomba had a population of 16 people.

== Geography ==
The Maryborough–Biggenden Road (State Route 86) runs along the northern boundary, entering the locality from the north-east (Dunmora / Yerra) and exiting to the west (Aramara).

Thinoomba State Forest is in the north and east of the locality. Apart from this protected area, the land use is grazing on native vegetation.

== History ==
The first section of the Mungar Junction to Monto railway line was from Mungar Junction to Brooweena which opened on 29 July 1889 with a siding established at Thinoomba (25.6004°S 152.4536°E). The railway siding name appears to the origin of the locality name. The last train on the railway line was in 2008 and in 2012 the line was officially closed.

Thinoomba Provisional School opened circa 1898. It closed in 1908. It was on the eastern side of Thinoomba Road (25.61116°S 152.45609°E). Circa 1918, the school building was relocated to Myrtle Creek to be the new Myrtle Creek State School at Yerra.

Gungaloon State School opened on 27 October 1921 and closed in 1931. It was on the eastern side of the junction of Thinoomba Road and Ross Road (25.57786°S 152.43654°E).

== Demographics ==
In the 2016 census, Thinoomba had a population of 31 people.

In the 2021 census, Thinoomba had a population of 16 people.

== Education ==
There are no schools in Thinoomba. The nearest government primary schools are Brooweena State School in Brooweena to the west, Mungar State School in Mungar to the east, and Tiaro State School in Tiaro to the south-east. The nearest government secondary school is Aldridge State High School in Maryborough to the north-east. There are a number of non-government schools in Maryborough and its suburbs.
