= Gungaloon, Queensland =

Gungaloon
- Suburb
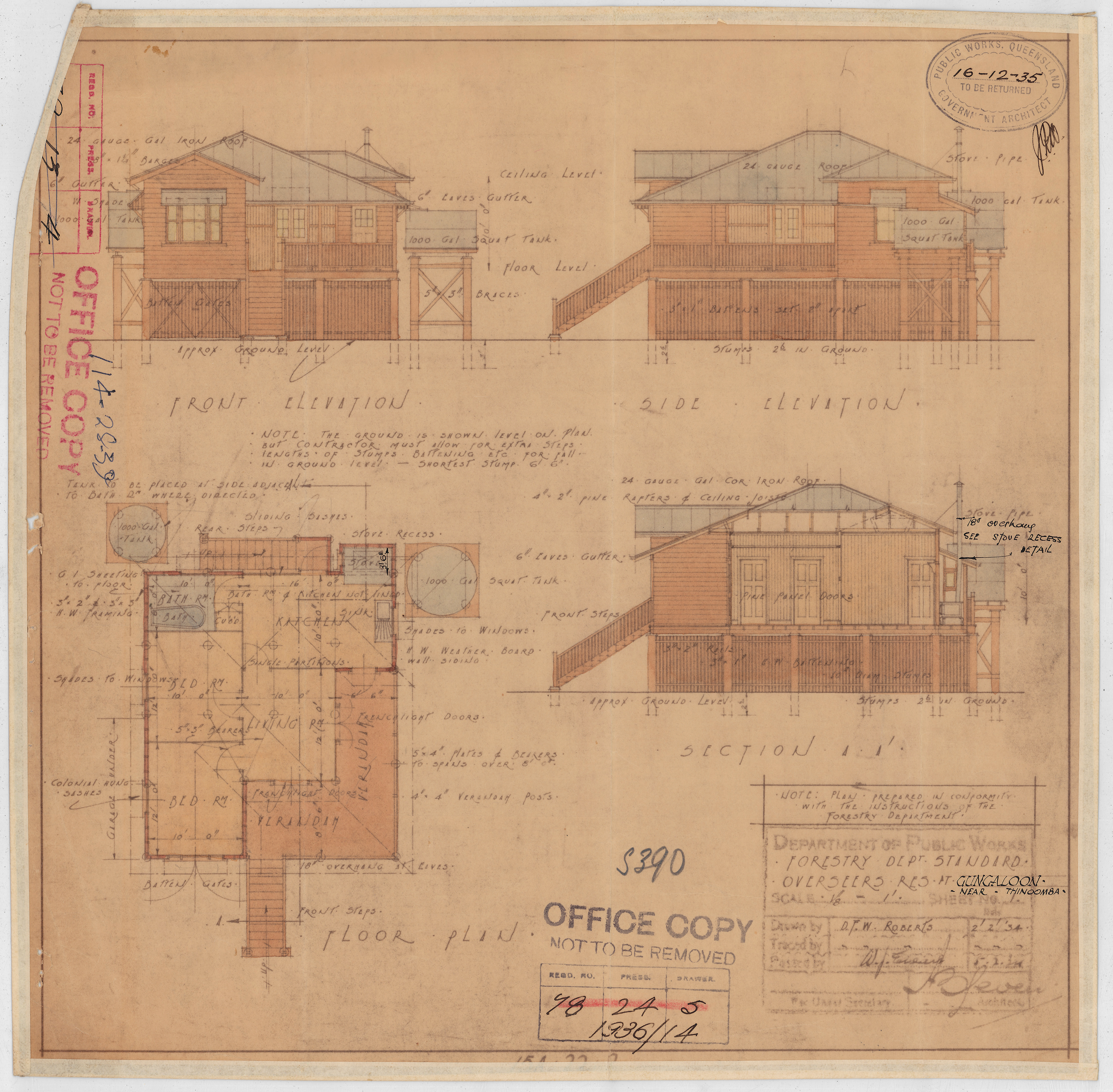
- Plans for a Forestry overseer's residence at Gungaloon, 1934

- Interactive map of Gungaloon
- Coordinates: 25.52°S 152.4613°E
- Country: Australia
- State: Queensland
- LGA: Fraser Coast Region
- Location: 26.1 km (16.2 mi) W of Maryborough; 55.1 km (34.2 mi) SW of Hervey Bay; 274 km (170 mi) N of Brisbane

Government
  - State electorate: Maryborough
  - Federal division: Wide Bay

Area
  - Total: 86.8 km^{2} (33.5 sq mi)

Population
  - Total: 27 (2021 census)
  - Density: 0.311/km^{2} (0.806/sq mi)
- Time zone: UTC+10:00 (AEST)
- Postcode: 4620
Suburbs around Gungaloon
| Doongul | Duckinwilla | Duckinwilla |
| Doongul | Gungaloon | Dunmora |
| Aramara | Thinoomba | Thinoomba |

Gungaloon is a rural locality in the Fraser Coast Region, Queensland, Australia. In the 2021 census, Gungaloon had a population of 27 people.

== Geography ==
Doongul Creek, a tributary of the Burrum River, forms most of the northern boundary. The Maryborough–Biggenden Road (State Route 86) forms the southern boundary, entering from the south-east (Thinoomba / Dunmora) and exiting to the south-west (Aramara).

The Old Gayndah Road enters the locality from the east (Dunmora) and exits to the west (Doongul).

A section of Wongi National Park is in the west of the locality. Wongi State Forest is in the north-west and the north-east of the locality, extending into neighbouring Doongul, Duckinwilla, and Dunmora. Gungaloon State Forest is in the south-east of the locality. Thinoomba State Forest is in the south of the locality extending into neighbouring Thinoomba.

Apart from these protected areas, the land use is grazing on native vegetation.

== History ==
It is unclear precisely when Doongal Lower Provisional School opened and closed. Subscriptions were called for in 1893 to build the school. The school was operating in 1896 when a teacher was transferred there. In 1915, the school building was sold for removal. It was at approx 25.50716°S 152.44329°E.

Gungaloon State School opened on 27 October 1921 and closed in 1931. It was on the eastern side of the junction of Thinoomba Road and Ross Road (25.57786°S 152.43654°E), now within neighbouring Thinoomba to the south.

== Demographics ==
In the 2016 census, Gungaloon had a population of 33 people.

In the 2021 census, Gungaloon had a population of 27 people.

== Education ==
There are no schools in Gungaloon. The nearest government primary schools are Sunbury State School in Maryborough to the east, Mungar State School in Mungar to the south-east, and Brooweena State School in Brooweena to the south-west. The nearest government secondary school is Aldridge State High School in Maryborough. There are also a number of non-government schools in Maryborough and its suburbs.
