= Central Sugar Mill Ruins =

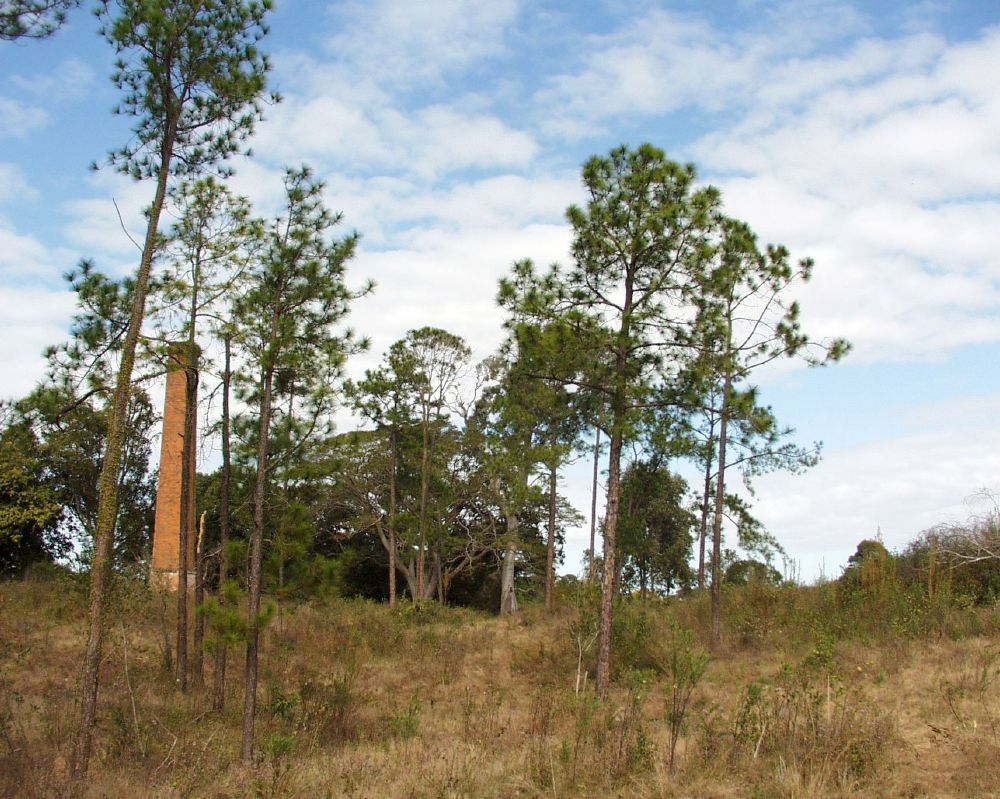
- Central Sugar Mill Ruins

- Location within Queensland Location within Australia
- 25.534°S 152.6353°E
- Location: Old Mill Road, Yengarie, Fraser Coast Region, Queensland, Australia

History
- Design period: 1840s–1860s (mid-19th century)
- Built: 1866–1890s

Queensland Heritage Register
- Official name: Central Sugar Mill Ruins
- Type: state heritage (built, archaeological)
- Designated: 5 December 2005
- Reference no.: 602488
- Significant period: 1860s (fabric); 1860s–1890s (historical use)
- Significant components: trees/plantings, objects (movable) – manufacturing/processing, chimney/chimney stack, tank – storage, wall/s, embankment – tramway, slag pile/slag heap

Central Sugar Mill Ruins is a heritage-listed former sugar cane mill at Old Mill Road, Yengarie, Fraser Coast Region, Queensland, Australia. It was built from 1866 to 1890s. It was added to the Queensland Heritage Register on 5 December 2005.

== History ==
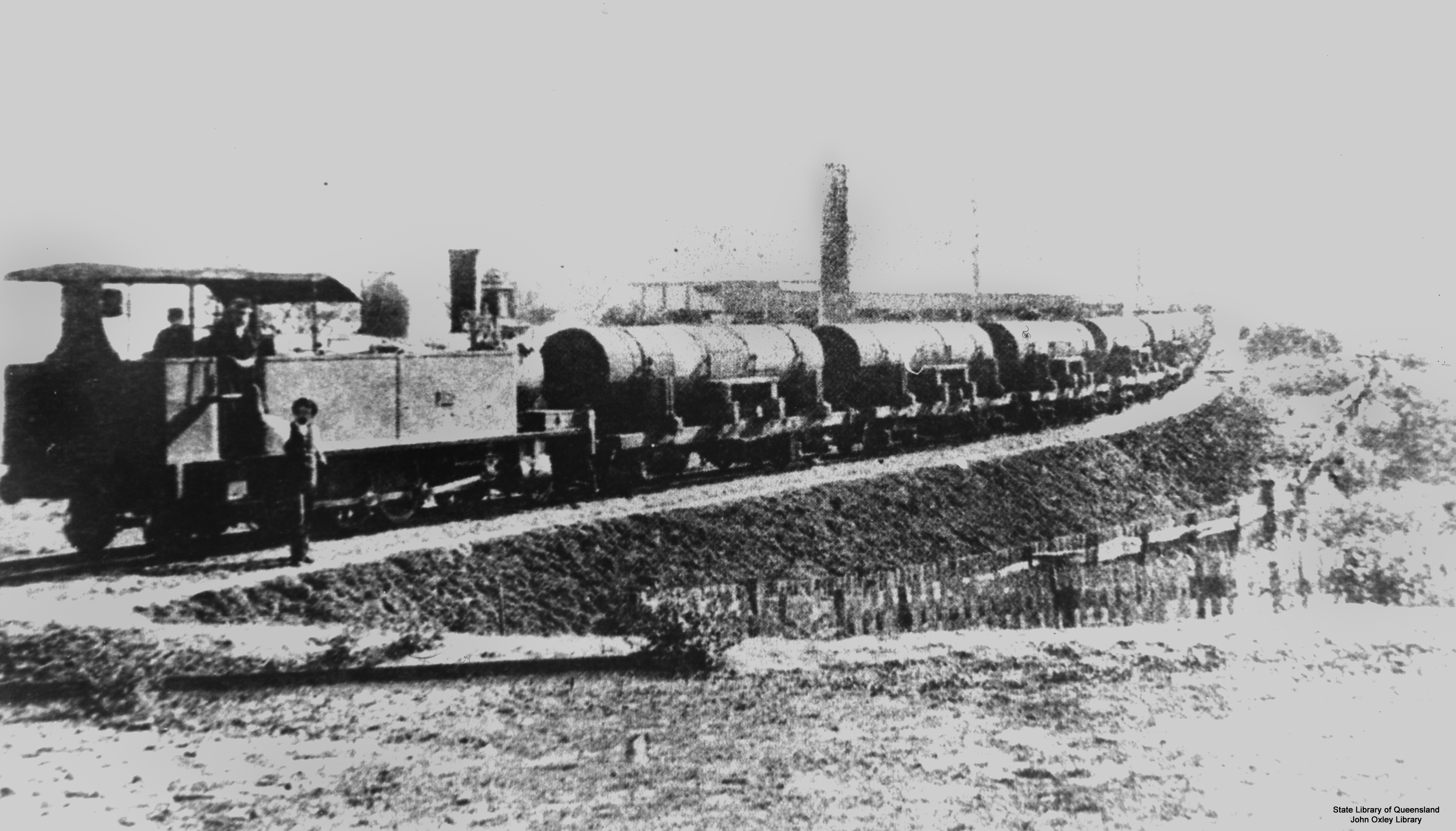
Sugar cane juice train Doolbi to Yengarie Queensland, early 1890s

The ruins of the Central Sugar Mill, overlooking the Mary River at Yengarie, are the remains of an industrial complex that was constructed in 1866 as a purpose built sugar mill and refinery. It serviced many sugar plantations in the area before closing in the late 1890s.

Sugar cane had been first brought to Australia in 1788 but subsequent plantings at Sydney, Port Macquarie and Norfolk Island failed to be commercially viable. Captain Louis Hope grew a cane crop successfully in Queensland in 1862. By 1864 the first commercial sugar mill in Australia had been established by him at Ormiston and interest in growing sugar cane spread rapidly. By the end of the decade cane was being cultivated further north at Maryborough, Mackay and Bundaberg, where the warmer climate proved more suitable for cane growing.

In 1862 John Buhot, originally from Barbados, in the West Indies, experimentally produced sugar granules from cane grown in the Brisbane Botanical Gardens, demonstrating its potential as a commercial crop in Queensland. A number of farmers were interested in growing cane, but little was known about its cultivation in local conditions, or about the production of sugar. In October 1864, Buhot came to Maryborough to purchase plants from John Eaton who was growing an experimental cane crop. While there, he gave a lecture at the School of Arts on the cultivation and manufacture of sugar to a large audience. While in Maryborough, Buhot also trialled sugar production from some of Eaton's crop with promising results. Eaton and others formed the Maryborough Sugar Company in August 1865 and purchased 400 acres (160 ha) at Tinana for a plantation and mill. Several blocks were under cane by 1865 and the first crop was crushed by primitive methods producing a coarse yellow sugar.

Local timber millers Frederick Gladwell and Robert Greathead decided to construct a central mill that would process cane from a number of surrounding farms. Buhot was engaged to design the mill complex and supervise the production of sugar. In July 1866 tender notices were placed in the Maryborough Chronicle for the manufacture of 50,000 bricks for mill buildings and for the erection of a "New Sugar Manufactory". John Murray undertook the brickwork, stone flooring was quarried locally and machinery was obtained from Sydney. By September, wharves were constructed on the riverbank below the refinery in order to accommodate sugar cane punts. Vessels carrying goods to and from the Central Mill also used the wharves. A large cutting was made in the riverbank for a rail line between the mill and the river. This was operated by a rope and windlass to transport goods and equipment up and down the embankment. Written agreements were obtained from local farmers regarding the supply of cane. It was a major commitment by both the partners and the farmers producing the "new" crop.

Unfortunately, an accident in October 1866 damaged the machinery and a boiler, which delayed crushing until February 1867. The late crush produced low sugar content and a very dark sugar. The enterprise experienced difficulties due to the small scale of the refinery, primitive equipment and inexperience. Although by September 1867 a fine light brown sugar was being produced, the problems of the business were compounded by an explosion and by a labour shortage caused by the discovery of gold at Gympie. In October the mill was operating night and day, but by November, it had closed due to financial problems.

The Australian Joint Stock Bank foreclosed on the mortgage and plant from the operation was sold at auction in Sydney in December 1867. Sale notices itemised a steam engine and boiler, evaporating pans, two large hardwood cane punts, a trolley with iron wheels with ratchet, a Cornish boiler and a tramway from the wharf.

The Central Mill was sold to John Meiklejohn who expanded the capacity of the mill and installed more modern equipment including centrifugals instead of the old-fashioned drainage boxes. He also installed a still for manufacturing rum that was in operation from July 1868. His first season produced a fine dry yellow sugar and by 1869 20,733 imperial gallons (94,250 L; 24,899 US gal) of rum also.

In early November 1868 the Maryborough Chronicle reported that the mill's end of season production was estimated to be 70 long tons (71 t) of sugar and 75 hogsheads of rum. The first shipment of locally produced rum left Maryborough on 11 November when 19 hogsheads from the Central Mill and 20 long tons (20 t) of sugar left on board the Saxonia for Sydney. In 1869/1870 William Gibson, who had operated a sugar mill near Brisbane, purchased the Central Mill, which he ran until the mid 1880s. However, by 1877 the Central was operating only as a juice mill, crushing growers' cane and delivering the juice to the nearby Yengarie Refinery. This had been established by Tooth & Cran in 1867 and was upgraded in 1871 to be a large modern refinery producing a high quality white sugar.

The 1890s brought problems due to depressed sugar prices and major changes in the sugar industry. Central mills servicing independent white farmers replaced the big plantations run by indentured labour, licenses to recruit Melanesian workers having ceased after December 1890. A number of plantations and mills closed and, by 1892, it was reported that much of the land along the Mary River was no longer under cultivation, or was growing crops other than sugar.

Cran purchased the Central Mill in the early 1890s but a major flood in 1893 damaged plantations and farms along the river and caused severe damage to the mill and to Yengarie Refinery. This closed in 1899 and the Central Mill was taken over by the Kersnovske family, becoming the Central Plantation. The family continued to grow sugar cane and later operated the property as a dairy farm. In more recent times, up to 5000 head of beef cattle have been grazed on the property.

The Central Mill structures gradually fell into disrepair and now comprise one intact chimney and the base of another, remains of structures, vats and tanks and a dam and tramway formation.

Several other related sites survive in the Yengarie area, including the Yengarie Sugar Refinery Ruins.

== Description ==
The Central Mill ruins are located on the banks of the Mary River about 11 kilometres (6.8 mi) southwest of Maryborough. The major visible built features on the site are:

- Two large fig trees 6.3 metres (21 ft) apart, which were planted at the entrance to the mill site
- Holding tank, a brick lined holding tank with a diameter of 4.7 metres (15 ft)
- Ruins of manager's house, washed away in 1893
- Mill chimneystack, square in plan and constructed of red bricks with arched openings to the east and west at ground level. It has stone foundations
- A section of stone mill flooring
- An underground metal storage tank, recently filled with rubble
- A rectangular metal juice tank measuring 1.17 by 2.47 metres (3 ft 10 in × 8 ft 1 in) constructed of riveted iron plates, in front of a rubble stone wall
- A lime slagheap 6.3 metres (21 ft) wide. Beside this are the remains of a stone base, possibly from a small chimneystack or furnace. A range of metal artefacts is located in the immediate area including rings and pipes.
- A tramway cutting between the first river terrace and the riverbank where the jetty once was, which has been obscured by vegetation.

== Heritage listing ==
Central Sugar Mill Ruins was listed on the Queensland Heritage Register on 5 December 2005 having satisfied the following criteria.

The place is important in demonstrating the evolution or pattern of Queensland's history.

The ruins of the Central Sugar Mill are evidence for an early industrial enterprise that made an important contribution to the development of the sugar industry in Queensland. The sugar industry has been of great importance to the development of Queensland for its contribution to the economy and to the pattern of European settlement. The Yengarie area was the site of some of the earliest sugar plantations and mills in Queensland. The Central Mill was one of the earliest places in Maryborough to produce sugar and crushed cane from many small farms, foreshadowing the later importance of central mills to the development of the sugar industry in Queensland.

The place demonstrates rare, uncommon or endangered aspects of Queensland's cultural heritage.

The Central Plantation Sugar Mill ruins are rare as an early sugar mill, refinery and distillery in Queensland.

The place has potential to yield information that will contribute to an understanding of Queensland's history.

The ruins of the Central Plantation Sugar Mill have the potential to reveal further information about the operation of the sugar industry in Queensland in the 19th century.

The place is important in demonstrating the principal characteristics of a particular class of cultural places.

The remains include characteristic features of a sugar mill and refinery including chimneys, underground vats, partial formations of a cane tramway and a dam which illustrate the processes involved

== See also ==
- List of tramways in Queensland
