= Maryborough–Biggenden Road =

Road in Queensland, Australia

Maryborough–Biggenden Road Queensland

General information
- Type: Rural road
- Length: 83.4 km (52 mi)
- Route number(s): State Route 86

Major junctions
- East end: Ferry Street (State Route 57), Maryborough
- Bruce Highway; Mungar Road; Brooweena–Woolooga Road
- West end: Isis Highway (State Route 52), Biggenden

Location(s)
- Major settlements: Maryborough West, Oakhurst, Aramara, Brooweena, Teebar, Boompa, Lakeside

Maryborough–Biggenden Road is an 83.4 kilometres (51.8 mi) road route in the Fraser Coast and North Burnett regions of Queensland, Australia. The entire route is signed as State Route 86.

The Maryborough–Biggenden Road (number 478) is a state-controlled district road, rated as a local road of regional significance (LRRS). Road 478 is not continuous from end to end, being broken midway by a part of Brooweena - Woolooga Road (number 487) and by Boompa Road (number 479).

== Route description ==
The road commences at an intersection with Ferry Street (State Route 57) in Maryborough. It leaves Maryborough as Alice Street, running north-west until it reaches the Bruce Highway which it crosses at a roundabout intersection. It then enters the locality of Maryborough West where it continues north-west as Alma Street, running parallel to the Mary River.

The road enters Oakhurst and continues west while the Mary River turns south-west. It passes the northern end of Mungar Road and crosses the North Coast railway line just south of Maryborough West railway station. After passing through farmland to the south of Wongi Forest Reserve, it veers to the south-west and passes through or beside several rural localities and Thinoomba State Forest before reaching Aramara, the site of a former railway station on the now defunct Mungar Junction to Monto railway line which opened to Brooweena in 1889 and to Biggenden in 1891.

It then runs west to Booweena before again turning south-west to Teebar where it follows part of Brooweena–Woolooga Road, and then west and north on Boompa Road to Boompa, the site of another former railway station. From there it continues north-west via Lakeside to Biggenden, passing to the north of Mount Walsh National Park. It enters Biggenden as George Street and terminates at an intersection with the Isis Highway (State Route 52).

== History ==
Pastoral leases were taken up in the Fraser Coast Region from 1843 and European settlement of what is now Maryborough began in 1847, with a survey for a township done in 1850. It was proclaimed a port of entry in 1859 and a municipality in 1861, and soon became a major port of entry for immigrants whose final destination was more accessible from Maryborough than from Brisbane.

In 1865, Cobb & Co expanded into Queensland and soon established a depot in Maryborough to service the flow of immigrants. While the Gympie goldfield was the destination of some, others were bound for the Upper Burnett Region or further west. A track suitable for stagecoaches was soon cut through to Biggenden and beyond. An undated Cobb & Co route map shows, as well as the route to Gympie, a coach route from Maryborough to the Shamrock goldfield near Degilbo, which would have passed through Biggenden.

Biggenden was founded in 1889 as a service centre for the nearby gold mining areas of Paradise and Shamrock, and for coach passengers travelling west from Maryborough. The arrival of the railway in 1891 reduced the usage of the road, but other factors soon led to increased demands for road improvements.

Settlements grew around the railway stations, resulting in more road-going vehicles, and some pastoral leases were partly opened up for closer settlement, further increasing the need for reliable roads. In 1887, 58,000 acres (23,000 ha) of land were resumed from the Teebar pastoral run for the establishment of small farms. The land was offered for selection on 17 April 1887. The opening of new farms led to the development of roads from Brooweena and Boompa to Teebar.

== The missing link ==
It is almost certain that the stagecoach track followed a more direct route from Brooweena to Boompa than the present road. The railway line certainly followed a more direct path. The former rail line alignment can be clearly seen on the satellite view in Google Maps. An unsealed road runs between the two villages, closely following the rail line. After the railway line was opened west of Brooweena, there was little need for a direct road link from there to Boompa, given the existence of an alternate route via Teebar that was being improved to service the farms in that locality. This situation remains to the present day.

== Intersecting state-controlled roads ==
This road intersects with the following state-controlled roads:

- Mungar Road
- Brooweena–Woolooga Road
- Boompa Road

=== Mungar Road ===
Mungar Road
- Location: Maryborough–Biggenden Road, Oakhurst to Bruce Highway, Tiaro, via Mungar
- Length: 28.1 km (17.5 mi)

Mungar Road (number 4807) is a state-controlled district road rated as a local road of regional significance (LRRS). It runs from Maryborough–Biggenden Road in Oakhurst, travelling via Mungar, to the Bruce Highway in Tiaro, a distance of 28.1 kilometres (17.5 mi). It services communities on the western side of the Mary River as far south as St Mary before crossing the river to Tiaro. This road has no major intersections.

=== Brooweena–Woolooga Road ===
Brooweena–Woolooga Road
- Location: Maryborough–Biggenden Road, Brooweena to Bauple–Woolooga Road, Woolooga, via Teebar
- Length: 56.8 km (35.3 mi)

Brooweena–Woolooga Road (number 487) is a state-controlled district road rated as a local road of regional significance (LRRS). It runs from Maryborough–Biggenden Road in Brooweena to Teebar as part of Maryborough - Biggenden Road, and then continues south to Bauple–Woolooga Road in Woolooga, a total distance of 56.8 kilometres (35.3 mi). This road intersects with Boompa Road in Teebar.

=== Boompa Road ===
Boompa Road
- Location: Brooweena–Woolooga Road, Teebar to Maryborough–Biggenden Road, Boompa
- Length: 8.8 km (5.5 mi)
- Route number: 86

Boompa Road (number 479) is a state-controlled district road rated as a local road of regional significance (LRRS). It runs from Brooweena–Woolooga Road in Teebar to Maryborough–Biggenden Road in Boompa as part of Maryborough–Biggenden Road (State Route 86), a distance of 8.8 kilometres (5.5 mi). This road has no major intersections.

== Major intersections ==
All distances are from Google Maps.

LGA	Location	km	mi	Destinations	Notes
Fraser Coast	Maryborough	0	0.0	Ferry Street (State Route 57) – northeast – Hervey Bay / southwest – Tinana, Gympie	Eastern end of Maryborough–Biggenden Road (State Route 86); Road continues north-west as Alice Street.
Fraser Coast	Maryborough / Maryborough West midpoint	3.3	2.1	Bruce Highway (A1) – north – Torbanlea, Childers / south – Tiaro, Gympie	Roundabout interchange. Continues north-west as Alma Street.
Fraser Coast	Oakhurst	7.2	4.5	Mungar Road – southwest – Mungar / St Mary, Tiaro	
Fraser Coast	Brooweena	47.5	29.5	Corfield Street – north – Brooweena village	Name changes to Brooweena – Woolooga Road. Continues west then south-west.
Fraser Coast	Teebar	56.4	35.0	Brooweena–Woolooga Road – Woolooga and Wide Bay Highway	Name changes to Boompa Road. Continues west then north.
Fraser Coast	Boompa	65.2	40.5	Boompa Road – north – Boompa village	Name reverts to Maryborough–Biggenden Road. Continues west.
North Burnett	Biggenden	83.4	51.8	Isis Highway (State Route 52) – northeast – Childers / southwest – Ban Ban Springs,	Western end of Maryborough–Biggenden Road (State Route 86)
1.000 mi = 1.609 km; 1.000 km = 0.621 mi: Route transition

== See also ==
- List of road routes in Queensland
- List of numbered roads in Queensland
- War Memorial Bridge, Brooweena
- Brooweena War Memorial
