= Pioneers Rest =

- Suburb
- Interactive map of Pioneers Rest
- Coordinates: 25.6680°S 152.5763°E
- Country: Australia
- State: Queensland
- LGA: Fraser Coast Region
- Location: 28.1 km (17.5 mi) SW of Maryborough; 57.8 km (35.9 mi) SW of Hervey Bay; 239 km (149 mi) N of Brisbane

Government
  - State electorate: Maryborough
  - Federal division: Wide Bay

Area
  - Total: 16.5 km^{2} (6.4 sq mi)

Population
  - Total: 78 (2021 census)
  - Density: 4.73/km^{2} (12.24/sq mi)
- Time zone: UTC+10:00 (AEST)
- Postcode: 4650
Suburbs around Pioneers Rest
St Mary	Antigua	Antigua
St Mary	Pioneers Rest	Owanyilla
St Mary	St Mary	Tiaro

Pioneers Rest is a rural locality in the Fraser Coast Region, Queensland, Australia. In the 2021 census, Pioneers Rest had a population of 78 people.

== Geography ==
The locality is bounded to the east by the Mary River and to the north by its tributary Myrtle Creek.

== History ==
Pioneers Rest Provisional School opened in 1870. On 1 January 1909, it became Pioneers Rest State School. In 1927, it closed due to low student numbers, but reopened on 27 August 1928. In December 1932, the school buildings of the then-closed Myrtle Creek State School in Yerra were relocated to Pioneers Rest to replace its school buildings. On 30 January 1939, Pioneer's Rest State School closed again and reopened on 3 May 1949. On 21 August 1950, it closed again, but reopened on 30 January 1951. In 1960, it closed permanently. It was to the south-east of the bend in Mungar Creek Access Road (approx 25.6655°S 152.5768°E).

== Demographics ==
In the 2016 census, Pioneers Rest had a population of 60 people.

In the 2021 census, Pioneers Rest had a population of 78 people.

== Education ==
There are no schools in Pioneers Rest. The nearest government primary schools are Tiaro State School in neighbouring Tiaro to the south-east and Mungar State School in Mungar to the north. The nearest government secondary school is Aldridge State High School in Maryborough to the north-east.
