= Dunmora, Queensland =

Dunmora
- Suburb
- Interactive map of Dunmora
- Coordinates: 25.5038°S 152.5497°E
- Country: Australia
- State: Queensland
- LGA: Fraser Coast Region
- Location: 19.8 km (12.3 mi) WNW of Maryborough; 48.9 km (30.4 mi) SW of Hervey Bay; 276 km (171 mi) N of Brisbane

Government
  - State electorate: Maryborough
  - Federal division: Wide Bay

Area
  - Total: 85.2 km^{2} (32.9 sq mi)

Population
  - Total: 281 (2021 census)
  - Density: 3.298/km^{2} (8.542/sq mi)
- Time zone: UTC+10:00 (AEST)
- Postcode: 4650
Suburbs around Dunmora
Gungaloon	Duckinwilla	Aldershot
Gungaloon	Dunmora	Oakhurst
Thinoomba	Yerra	Yengarie

Dunmora is a rural locality in the Fraser Coast Region, Queensland, Australia. In the 2021 census, Dunmora had a population of 281 people.

== Geography ==
The locality is bounded to the south by the Maryborough–Biggenden Road. The Old Gayndah Road splits from the Marybrough-Biggenden Road in the south-east of the locality and proceeds west through the south of the locality exiting along the western boundary into neighbouring Gungaloon.

The northern part of the locality is within the Wongi State Forest. The southern part of the locality is predominantly used for grazing on native vegetation with some crop growing and rural residential housing.

== History ==
In 1880, residents were lobbying for a school to be established. Dunmora Provisional School opened circa 1881. On 1 January 1909, it became Dunmora State School. It closed in 1912.

Dunmora Central Provisional School opened in 1899. On 1 January 1909, it became Dunmora Central State School. It closed in 1931. It reopened on 15 September 1936 before closing permanently in 1941. It was on the southern side of Old Gayndah Road (25.52686°S 152.50283°E).

== Demographics ==
In the 2016 census, Dunmora had a population of 222 people.

In the 2021 census, Dunmora had a population of 281 people.

== Education ==
There are no schools in Dunmora. The nearest government primary schools are Sunbury State School in Maryborough to the east and Mungar State School in Mungar to the south-east. The nearest government secondary school is Aldridge State High School, also in Maryborough.

== Facilities ==
Dunmora Rural Fire Station is on the southern side of Old Gayndah Road (25.5179°S 152.5715°E).
