= Mount Doongul =

Mountain in Queensland, Australia

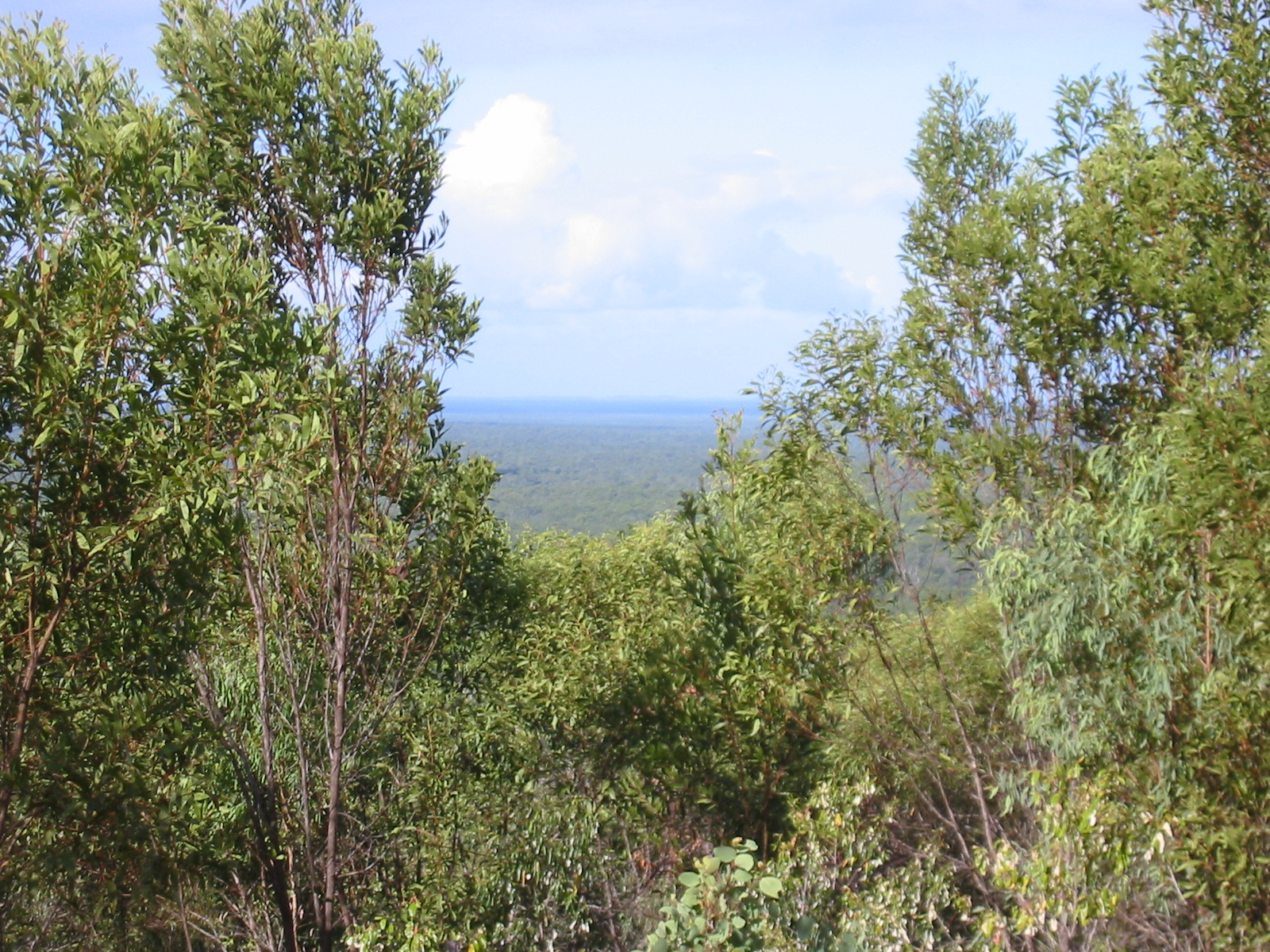
- The view from the top looking south-east at February 2006

Highest point
- Elevation: 231 m (758 ft)
- Coordinates: 25°29′13″S 152°20′41″E

Geography
- Location within Queensland
- Location: Queensland, Australia

Mount Doongul is a mountain in Queensland state forest north of Maryborough, Australia. The mountain, although not particularly high, is said to offer views to Fraser Island off the southern Queensland coast and north to the town of Childers. Mount Doongul can be reached via the Maryborough-Biggenden Road and then by taking the North Aramara turn-off and following unsealed roads.

== See also ==
- List of mountains in Australia
