= Oakhurst, Queensland =

Oakhurst
- Suburb
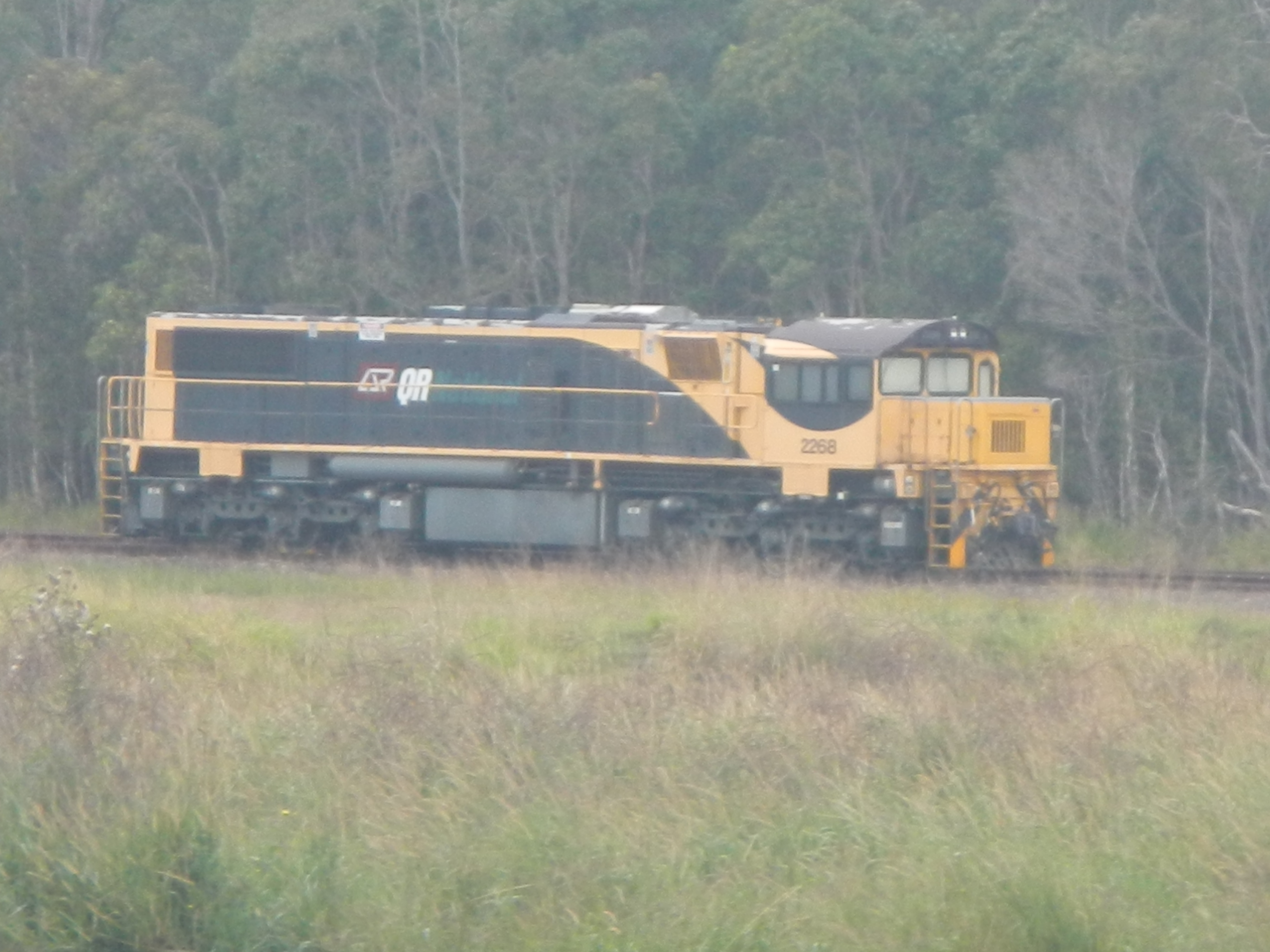
- Locomotive on the North Coast railway line just south of Maryborough West railway station

- Interactive map of Oakhurst
- Coordinates: 25.5125°S 152.6263°E
- Country: Australia
- State: Queensland
- LGA: Fraser Coast Region
- Location: 10.1 km (6.3 mi) WNW of Maryborough; 39.1 km (24.3 mi) SW of Hervey Bay; 92.6 km (57.5 mi) N of Gympie; 271 km (168 mi) N of Brisbane

Government
  - State electorate: Maryborough
  - Federal division: Wide Bay

Area
  - Total: 24.4 km^{2} (9.4 sq mi)

Population
  - Total: 1,717 (2021 census)
  - Density: 70.37/km^{2} (182.3/sq mi)
- Time zone: UTC+10:00 (AEST)
- Postcode: 4650
Suburbs around Oakhurst
Dunmora	Dunmora	Aldershot
Dunmora	Oakhurst	Maryborough West
Yengarie	Yengarie	Tinana

Oakhurst is a mixed-use locality in the Fraser Coast Region, Queensland, Australia. In the 2021 census, Oakhurst had a population of 1,717 people.

== Geography ==
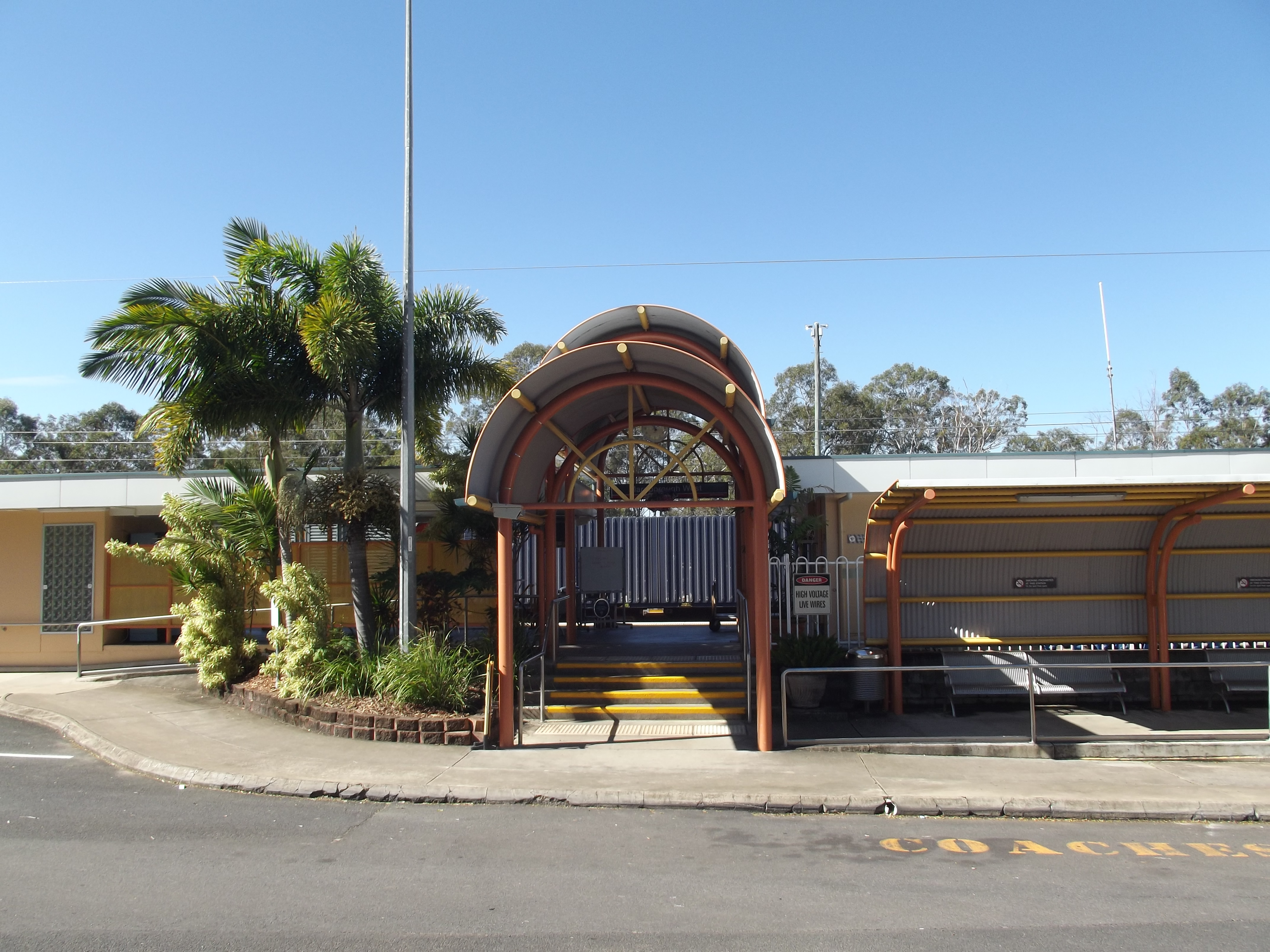
Maryborough West railway station, 2012

The Mary River forms part of the eastern boundary.

The Maryborough–Biggenden Road (State Route 86) enters the locality from the east (Maryborough West) where it is known as Gayndah Road. It exits the locality to the west (Dunmora/Yengarie).

The North Coast railway line enters the locality from the south (Yengarie). Despite the name, the locality is served by the Maryborough West railway station (25.5080°S 152.6366°E), which has replaced Maryborough railway station as the main stop serving Maryborough on the North Coast line. The station is the junction where the North Coast railway line splits into two. The new electrified main line exits the locality to the north-east (Aldershot / Maryborough West) bound ultimately for Cairns. The older not-electrified line exits the locality to the east (Maryborough West) bound for Maryborough. This line is still required to transport rolling stock to and from the Walkers Limited workshop (now operated by Downer Rail).

The locality is increasingly becoming a suburb of Maryborough with rural residential housing being the major land use. The remaining land is used for grazing on native vegetation and growing sugarcane.

== History ==
Oakhurst was historically served by the Oakhurst railway station (25.51469°S 152.63264°E). However, Maryborough West railway station was opened in 1989 as a replacement for Maryborough and Baddow stations, when the latter was bypassed by a new seven kilometre alignment that was built as part of the electrification of the North Coast line.

Once, the locality of Oakhurst was split between the Shire of Woocoo and the City of Maryborough. However, on 2 July 2010, it was regazetted as being solely within the Fraser Coast Region.

== Demographics ==
In the 2016 census, Oakhurst had a population of 1,444 people.

In the 2021 census, Oakhurst had a population of 1,717 people.

== Education ==
There are no schools in Oakhurst. The nearest government primary school is Sunbury State School in Maryborough to the east. The nearest government secondary school is Aldridge State High School, also in Maryborough.

TAFE Queensland delivers vocational education at its Wide Bay campus at 65 Nagel Street (25.5058°S 152.6545°E).

== Amenities ==
Wook-koo Park (formerly Oakhurst Park) is on the south-eastern corner of Loretta Drive and Woocoo Drive (25.5158°S 152.6146°E). It offers facilities for sport, picnics and BBQs, and walking tracks. One walk features sculptures of animals.

== Facilities ==
Oakhurst SES Facility is at 5 Boundary Road (25.5150°S 152.6249°E).
