= Riverside Christian College =

Private school in Maryborough West, Queensland, Australia

Information
- Former name: Maryborough Christian Academy (1983-2002)
- Funding type: Private school
- Established: 1 February 1983; 43 years ago
- Grades: R-12

Riverside Christian College, formerly Maryborough Christian Academy, is a private primary and secondary school in Maryborough West, Queensland.

== History ==
Maryborough Christian Academy opened as a primary school on 1 February 1983 at the Maryborough Christian Outreach Centre (affiliated with the Christian Outreach Centre a network of Pentecostal churches, now known as the International Network of Churches) with fewer than 40 students. Pastor David Blair and Principal Brendan Kelly ran the school from 1983 to 1992, including presiding over a 1991 expansion to offer distance education.

From 1993 to 1996, the school was governed by the Australian Education Foundation, until the Maryborough Christian Education Foundation was established in 1996. In that year land was purchased in Royle Street to create a permanent home for the school, and the school moved to the site in 1998.

In 2002, it was renamed Riverside Christian College, changed the curriculum to follow the Queensland Studies Authority curriculum, and progressively introduced secondary schooling, with Year 10 being added in 2006. In the 2010s, the school started offering year 11 and year 12, effectively become a prep - year 12 school.

== Description ==
The private R-12 school is situated at 23 Royle Street, Maryborough West(25.5177°S 152.6645°E). Its student cohort live locally, as well as across Australia and overseas. Its mission is "To provide a quality Christian education".

In 2018, it had an enrolment of 1,126 students with 77 teachers (69.4 equivalent full-time) and 45 non-teaching staff (39.6 equivalent full-time).

== Alumni ==
- Arisa Trew
