= Yengarie, Queensland =

Yengarie
- Suburb
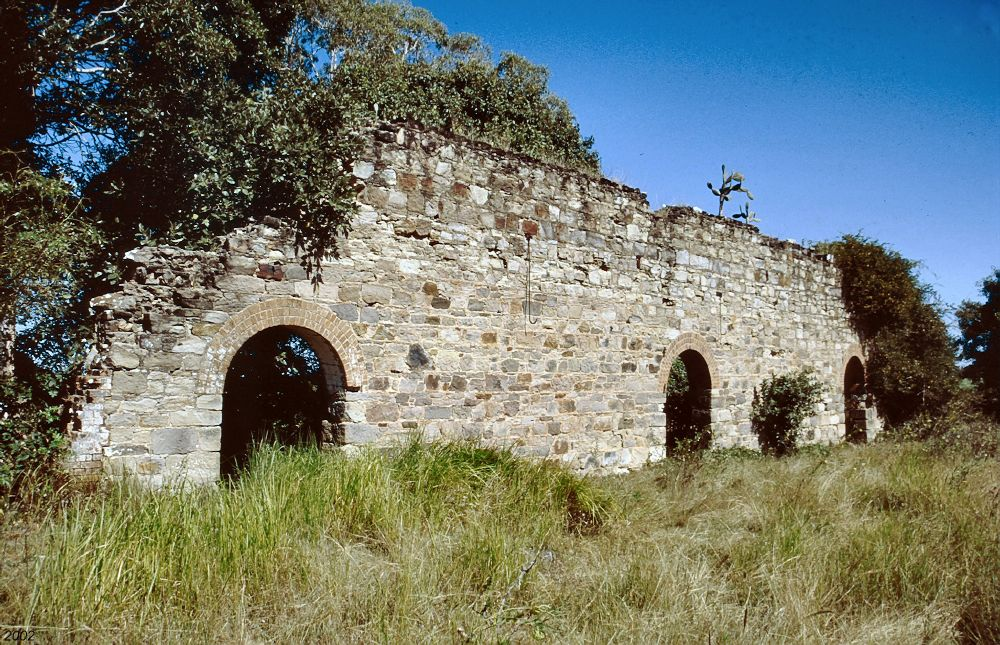
- Yengarie Sugar Refinery ruins, 2002

- Interactive map of Yengarie
- Coordinates: 25.5427°S 152.5958°E
- Country: Australia
- State: Queensland
- LGA: Fraser Coast Region
- Location: 13.6 km (8.5 mi) W of Maryborough; 42.6 km (26.5 mi) SW of Hervey Bay; 116 km (72 mi) S of Bundaberg; 258 km (160 mi) N of Brisbane

Government
  - State electorate: Maryborough
  - Federal division: Wide Bay

Area
  - Total: 27.2 km^{2} (10.5 sq mi)

Population
  - Total: 615 (2021 census)
  - Density: 22.61/km^{2} (58.56/sq mi)
- Time zone: UTC+10:00 (AEST)
- Postcode: 4650
Suburbs around Yengarie
Dunmora	Oakhurst	Tinana
Dunmora	Yengarie	Tinana
Yerra	Grahams Creek	Tinana

Yengarie is a rural locality in the Fraser Coast Region, Queensland, Australia. In the 2021 census, Yengarie had a population of 615 people.

== Geography ==
The North Coast railway line enters the locality from the south (Grahams Creek) and exits to the north (Oakhurst). The locality is served by Yengarie railway station (25.5556°S 152.6106°E).

== History ==
Yengarie School opened on 30 March 1868 as a non-vested school (funded by the Queensland Government but not operated by the government). On 14 July 1873, it became Yenagarie State School (operated by the government). In 1873, it had 89 students and a new school building was being constructed to replace the old building described as "dilapidated and overcrowded". It closed in 1963. It was at 340 Old Mill Road (25.55534°S 152.61673°E).

Yengarie Hall was opened in 1886. It was designed by architect James Robertson. It was used for meetings of the Antigua Divisional Board until 1903 and then the Antigua Shire Council until 1917 .

== Demographics ==
In the 2016 census, Yengarie had a population of 460 people.

In the 2021 census, Yengarie had a population of 615 people.

== Heritage listings ==
Yengarie has a number of State and Local heritage-listed sites, including:

- Central Sugar Mill Ruins, Old Mill Road
- Yengarie Sugar Refinery Ruins, Old Mill Road
- Yengarie Hall, Mungar Road

== Education ==
There are no schools in Yengarie. The nearest government primary schools are Mungar State School in Mungar to the south and Sunbury State School in Maryborough to the north-east. The nearest government secondary school is Aldridge State High School in Maryborough.

== Amenities ==
Yengarie Hall is a community centre on Mungar Road (25.5521°S 152.6048°E). Its grounds contain facilities for tennis and basketball as well as a playground and BBQ/picnic facilities.

Pleasant View Park is at the end of Pleasant View Road and on the bank of the Mary River (25.5491°S 152.6267°E). Pleasant View Road boat ramp is within the park providing access to the river (25.5494°S 152.6278°E). It is managed by the Fraser Coast Regional Council.

== See also ==
- List of tramways in Queensland
