= Shire of Antigua =

Former local government area in Queensland, Australia (1879–1917)

Coordinates: 25.628°S 152.590°E

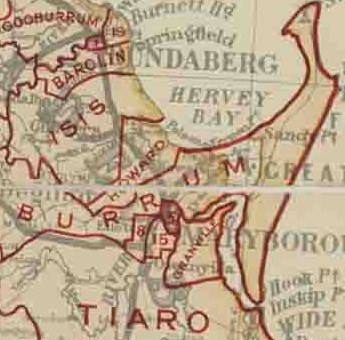
Map of Antigua Division and adjacent local government areas, March 1902. Legend: Town of Maryborough (3), Antigua Division (8), Tinana Division (15)

The Shire of Antigua is a former local government area in the Wide Bay–Burnett area of Queensland, Australia, centred on the town of Yengarie. It existed between 1879 and 1917.

== History ==
On 11 November 1879, the Antigua Division was created as one of 74 divisions within Queensland under the Divisional Boards Act 1879 with a population of 1636.

With the passage of the Local Authorities Act 1902, the Antigua Division became the Shire of Antigua on 31 March 1903.

On 4 December 1914 part of Antigua Shire was amalgamated with part of Howard Shire and part of Tiaro Shire to create Woocoo Shire.

The Shire of Antigua was abolished on 15 February 1917 and divided between the Shire of Burrum and the Shire of Woocoo.

Yengarie Hall was opened in 1886. It was designed by architect James Robertson. It was used for meetings of the Antigua Divisional Board until 1903 and then the Antigua Shire Council until 1917.

== Chairmen ==
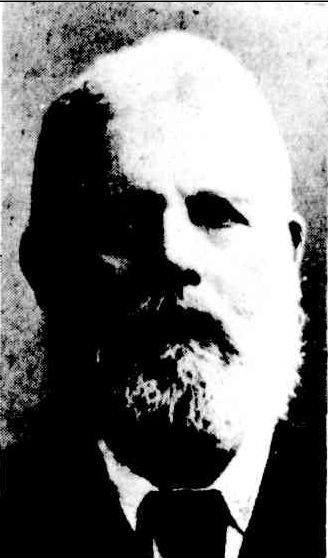
Councillor J. Mahoney of Yengarie, Antigua Shire, 1911

- 1910–11: J. Mahoney
