= Doongul, Queensland =

Doongul
- Suburb
- Interactive map of Doongul
- Coordinates: 25.4761°S 152.3483°E
- Country: Australia
- State: Queensland
- LGA: Fraser Coast Region
- Location: 22.6 km (14.0 mi) NE of Brooweena; 37.1 km (23.1 mi) W of Maryborough; 66.1 km (41.1 mi) SW of Hervey Bay; 297 km (185 mi) N of Brisbane

Government
  - State electorate: Maryborough
  - Federal division: Wide Bay

Area
  - Total: 196.8 km^{2} (76.0 sq mi)

Population
  - Total: 35 (2021 census)
  - Density: 0.1778/km^{2} (0.461/sq mi)
- Time zone: UTC+10:00 (AEST)
- Postcode: 4620
Suburbs around Doongul
Kullogum	Duckinwilla	Duckinwilla
Golden Fleece	Doongul	Gungaloon
North Aramara	North Aramara	Aramara

Doongul is a rural locality in the Fraser Coast Region, Queensland, Australia. In the 2021 census, Doongul had a population of 35 people.

== Geography ==
Most of the locality is with protected areas. The west of the locality is within the Wongi National Park which extends into neighbouring Golden Fleece to the west. The small Fairlies Knob National Park is immediately south of the Wongi National Park in the south-west of the locality. Apart from the national parks, almost all of the rest of the locality is within the Wongi State Forest, except for the centre and south-east, where the land use is grazing on native vegetation.

Doongul has the following mountains, from north to south:

- Duckke Benong (25.4387°S 152.3654°E) 107 metres (351 ft)
- Mount Doongul (25.4872°S 152.3447°E) 238 metres (781 ft)
- Musket Flat Mountain (25.4901°S 152.3848°E) 217 metres (712 ft)
- Fairlies Knob (25.5018°S 152.2908°E) 323 metres (1,060 ft)
- Cabbage Tree Mountain (25.5511°S 152.3981°E) 266 metres (873 ft)

The town of Eliott (25.50°S 152.37°E) is within Doongul on the Old Gayndah Road.

== History ==
The locality was previously known as Muskat Flat. It presumably takes its present name Doongul from the Doongul parish and Doongul Creek, which are thought to take their name from the Doongal pastoral run, described in 1862 as being 20 miles (32 km) from Maryborough.

On 18 July 1864, 39 town lots were offered for sale in Eliott.

In 1877, 20,200 acres (8,200 ha) of land was resumed from the Lower Doongul pastoral run to establish smaller farms. A further 6,000 acres (2,400 ha) was resumed from the Doongul pastoral run. The land was offered for selection on 17 April 1877.

== Demographics ==
In the 2016 census, Doongul had a population of 29 people.

In the 2021 census, Doongul had a population of 35 people.

== Education ==
There are no schools in Doongul. The nearest government primary school is Brooweena State School in Brooweena to the south-west. The nearest government secondary school is Aldridge State High School in Maryborough in the east.
