= Aramara, Queensland =

Aramara
- Town
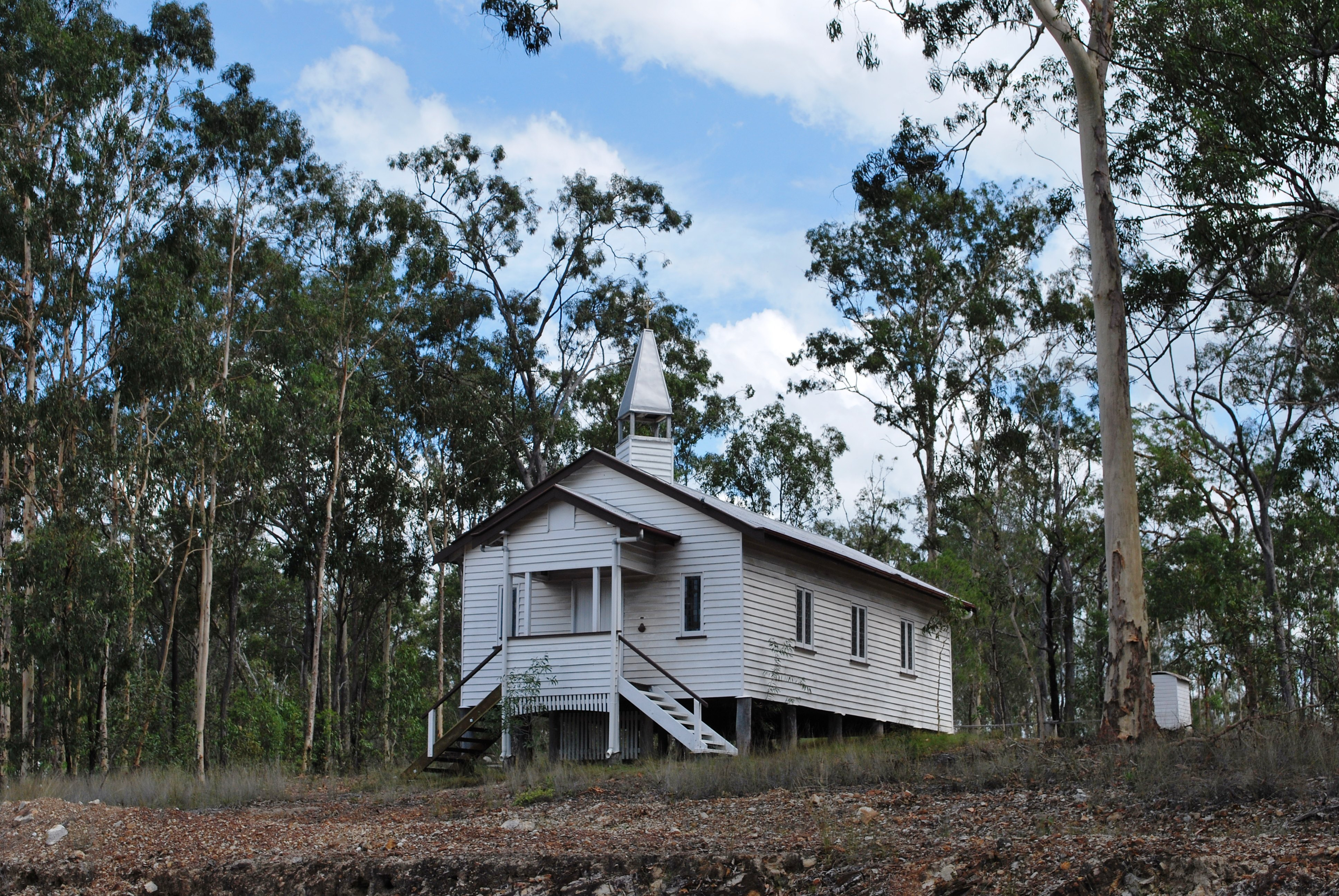
- Our Lady of the Way Catholic Church, 2008

- Interactive map of Aramara
- Coordinates: 25.6113°S 152.3213°E
- Country: Australia
- State: Queensland
- LGA: Fraser Coast Region
- Location: 42.4 km (26.3 mi) W of Maryborough; 71.5 km (44.4 mi) SW of Hervey Bay; 278 km (173 mi) N of Brisbane

Government
  - State electorate: Maryborough
  - Federal division: Wide Bay

Area
  - Total: 77.2 km^{2} (29.8 sq mi)

Population
  - Total: 71 (2021 census)
  - Density: 0.920/km^{2} (2.382/sq mi)
- Time zone: UTC+10:00 (AEST)
- Postcode: 4620
Localities around Aramara
North Aramara	Doongul	Gungaloon
Brooweena	Aramara	Thinoomba
Brooweena	Woocoo	Woocoo

Aramara is a rural town and locality in the Fraser Coast Region, Queensland, Australia. In the 2021 census, the locality of Aramara had a population of 71 people.

== Geography ==
The Maryborough–Biggenden Road (State Route 86) runs through from east to west.

== History ==
The town's name is a Kabi language word Ooramara or Yuramurra, meaning many spotted gum trees (Eucalyptus maculata).

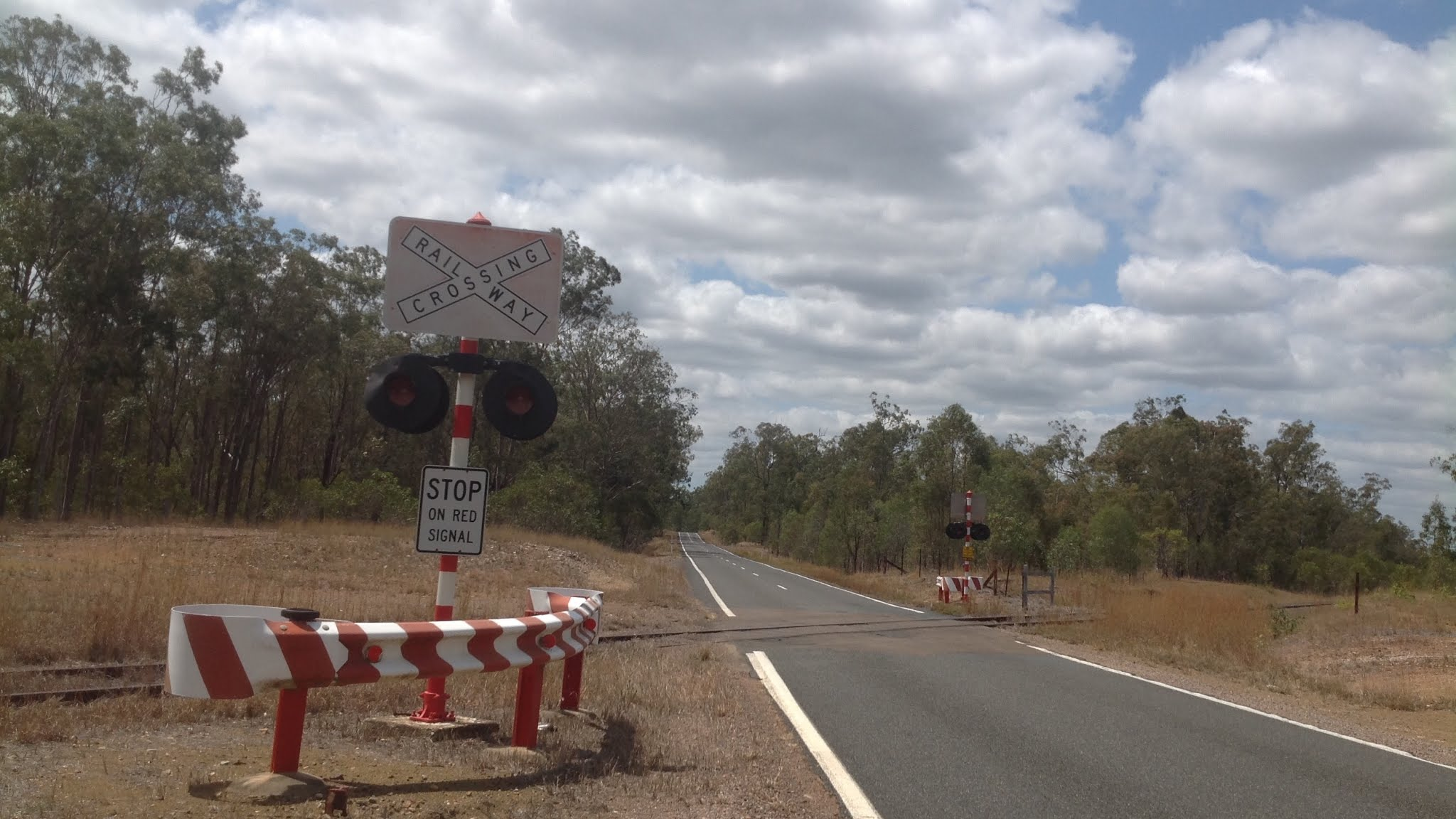
Disused Level Crossing in Aramara, Queensland, Australia

The first section of the Mungar Junction to Monto railway line from Mungar Junction to Brooweena was opened on 29 July 1889 and a siding established at Aramara. In 2012 it was announced the line was officially closed.

Aramara Provisional School opened on 23 January 1899. On 1 January 1909, it became Aramara State School. It closed on 19 May 1967.

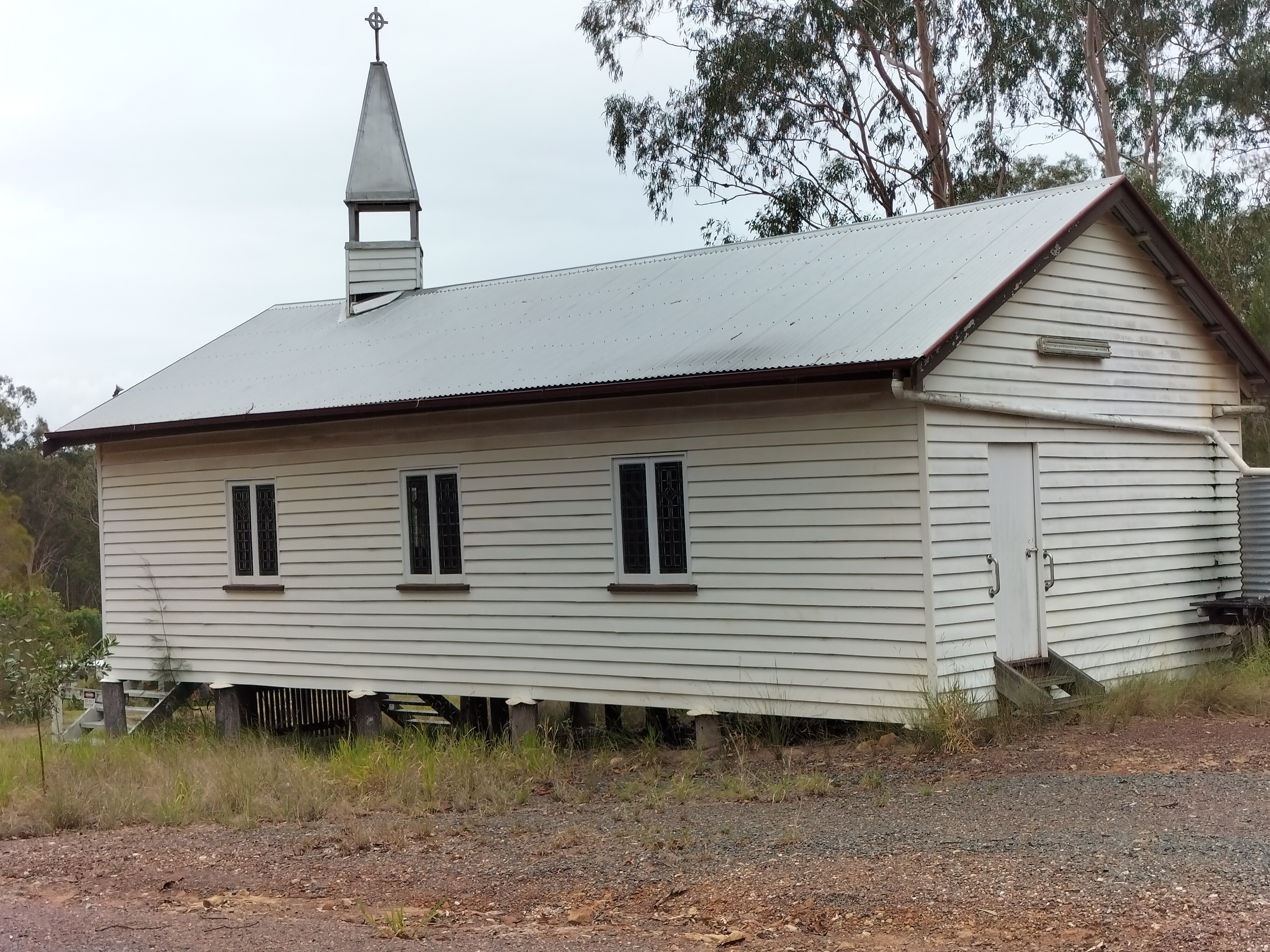
Our Lady of the Way Catholic Church in 2023

After fifteen years of fund-raising the Our Lady of the Way Catholic Church was blessed and consecrated by Archbishop James Duhig on 26 February 1950. In response to the welcome given, the Archbishop referred to the dairying, cattle raising and timber industries in the district and said that for every tree felled for building purposes, one should be planted. This was consistent with his beliefs that more people should think nationally, rather than locally. The church was built by Malachi Rooney of Maryborough.

== Demographics ==
In the 2016 census, the locality of Aramara had a population of 57 people.

In the 2021 census, the locality of Aramara had a population of 71 people.

== Heritage listing ==
Fraser Coast Regional Council placed the Our Lady of the Way Catholic Church on its Local Heritage Register.

== Education ==
There are no schools in Aramara. The nearest government primary school is Brooweena State School in neighbouring Brooweena to the west. The nearest government secondary school is Aldridge State High School in Maryborough to the north-east.
