= Fairlies Knob National Park =

National park in Queensland, Australia

- IUCN category II (national park)
- Location within Queensland
- Location: Queensland
- Nearest city: Aramara
- Coordinates: 25°30′18″S 152°17′35″E
- Area: 0.56 km^{2} (0.22 sq mi)
- Established: 1910
- Governing body: Queensland Parks and Wildlife Service

Fairlies Knob is a national park in Doongul, Fraser Coast Region, Queensland, Australia, 231 km north of Brisbane. The estimated elevation of the terrain is 259 metres.

== Wildlife ==
The park is home to 165 species of animals and 250 species of plants.

== See also ==
- Protected areas of Queensland
