= Yerra =

- Suburb
- Interactive map of Yerra
- Coordinates: 25.5916°S 152.5436°E
- Country: Australia
- State: Queensland
- LGA: Fraser Coast Region
- Location: 29.9 km (18.6 mi) WSW of Maryborough; 58.9 km (36.6 mi) SW of Hervey Bay; 133 km (83 mi) S of Bundaberg; 257 km (160 mi) N of Brisbane

Government
  - State electorate: Maryborough
  - Federal division: Wide Bay

Area
  - Total: 55.0 km^{2} (21.2 sq mi)

Population
  - Total: 110 (2021 census)
  - Density: 2.00/km^{2} (5.18/sq mi)
- Time zone: UTC+10:00 (AEST)
- Postcode: 4650
Suburbs around Yerra
Dunmora	Yengarie	Grahams Creek
Thinoomba	Yerra	Mungar; Pilerwa
St Mary	St Mary	Antigua

Yerra is a rural locality in the Fraser Coast Region, Queensland, Australia. In the 2021 census, Yerra had a population of 110 people.

== Geography ==
Yerra railway station is an abandoned railway station on the now-closed Gayndah railway line (25.6075°S 152.5364°E).

== History ==
Yerra State School opened on 11 November 1912. The school was on a 2-acre (0.81 ha) site donated by W. Day within a "few hundred yards" from the railway station. The first teacher was Miss McWatters. It closed on 13 December 1974.

Circa 1918, the Thinoomba Provisional School building was relocated to Myrtle Creek about 3.5 miles (5.6 km) from Yerra to open as Myrtle Creek State School. Miss Gibson was the first teacher at the school and commenced her duties on 11 May 1918. The school closed in 1929. In August 1932, the school building and playshed for offered for sale and removal, but in December 1932, the school buildings were relocated to Pioneer's Rest State School in Pioneers Rest.

== Demographics ==
In the 2016 census, Yerra had a population of 102 people.

In the 2021 census, Yerra had a population of 110 people.

== Education ==
There are no schools in Yerra. The nearest government primary school is Mungar State School in neighbouring Mungar to the east. The nearest government secondary school is Aldridge State High School in Maryborough to the north-east.
