= Antigua, Queensland =

Antigua
- Suburb
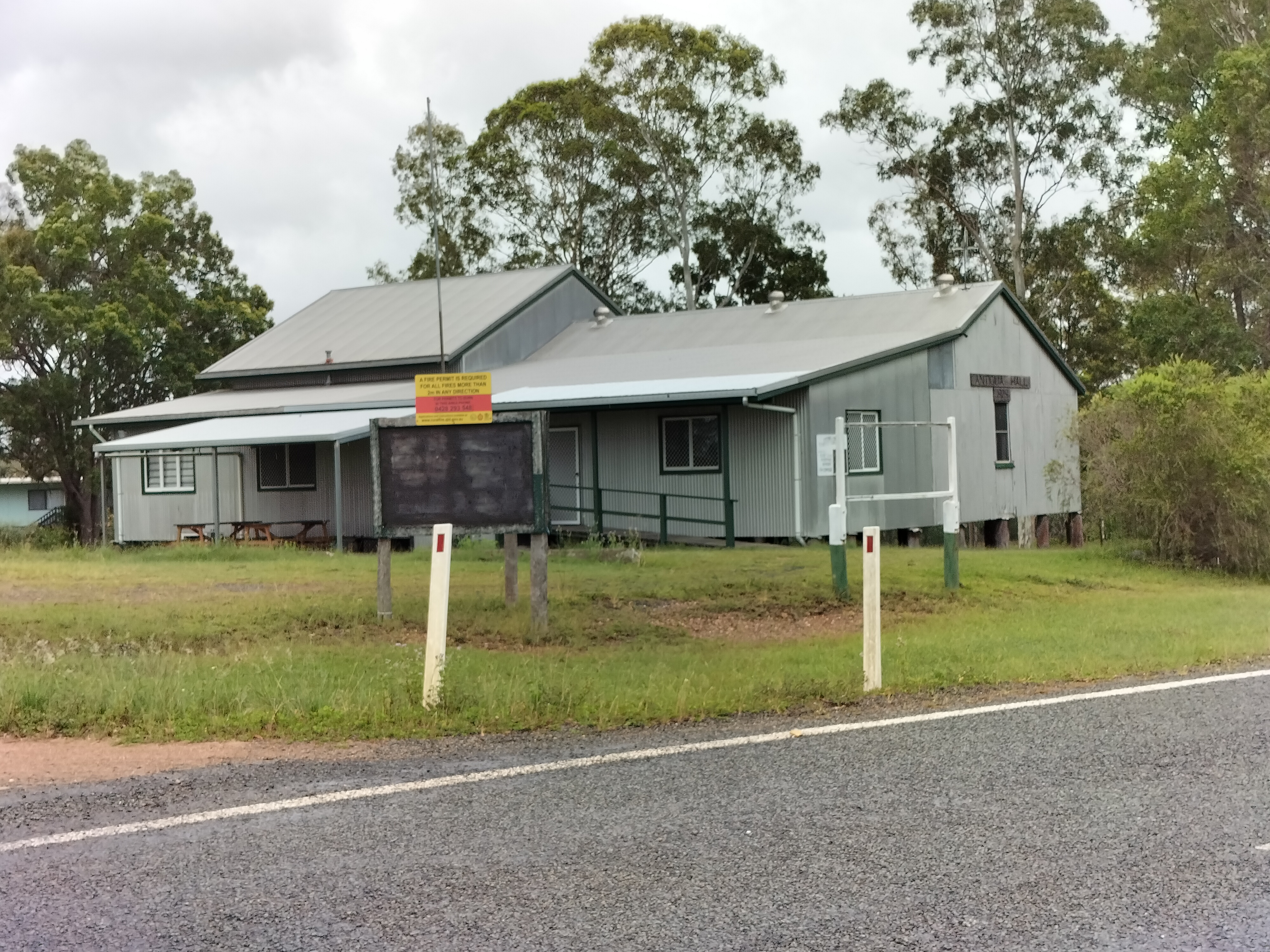
- Antigua Community Hall, 2023

- Interactive map of Antigua
- Coordinates: 25.6302°S 152.5936°E
- Country: Australia
- State: Queensland
- LGA: Fraser Coast Region
- Location: 23.3 km (14.5 mi) SW of Maryborough; 52.3 km (32.5 mi) SW of Hervey Bay; 240 km (150 mi) N of Brisbane

Government
  - State electorate: Maryborough
  - Federal division: Wide Bay

Area
  - Total: 17.2 km^{2} (6.6 sq mi)

Population
  - Total: 126 (2021 census)
  - Density: 7.33/km^{2} (18.97/sq mi)
- Time zone: UTC+10:00 (AEST)
- Postcode: 4650
Suburbs around Antigua
Pilerwa	Mungar	Ferney
Yerra	Antigua	Glenorchy
St Mary	Pioneers Rest	Owanyilla

Antigua is a rural locality in the Fraser Coast Region, Queensland, Australia. In the 2021 census, Antigua had a population of 126 people.

== Geography ==
The Mary River is the eastern boundary of the locality and Myrtle Creek is the southern boundary.

The North Coast railway line passes through the locality from south to north. The locality was once served by the Antigua railway station (25.6379°S 152.6023°E), but it is now abandoned.

== History ==
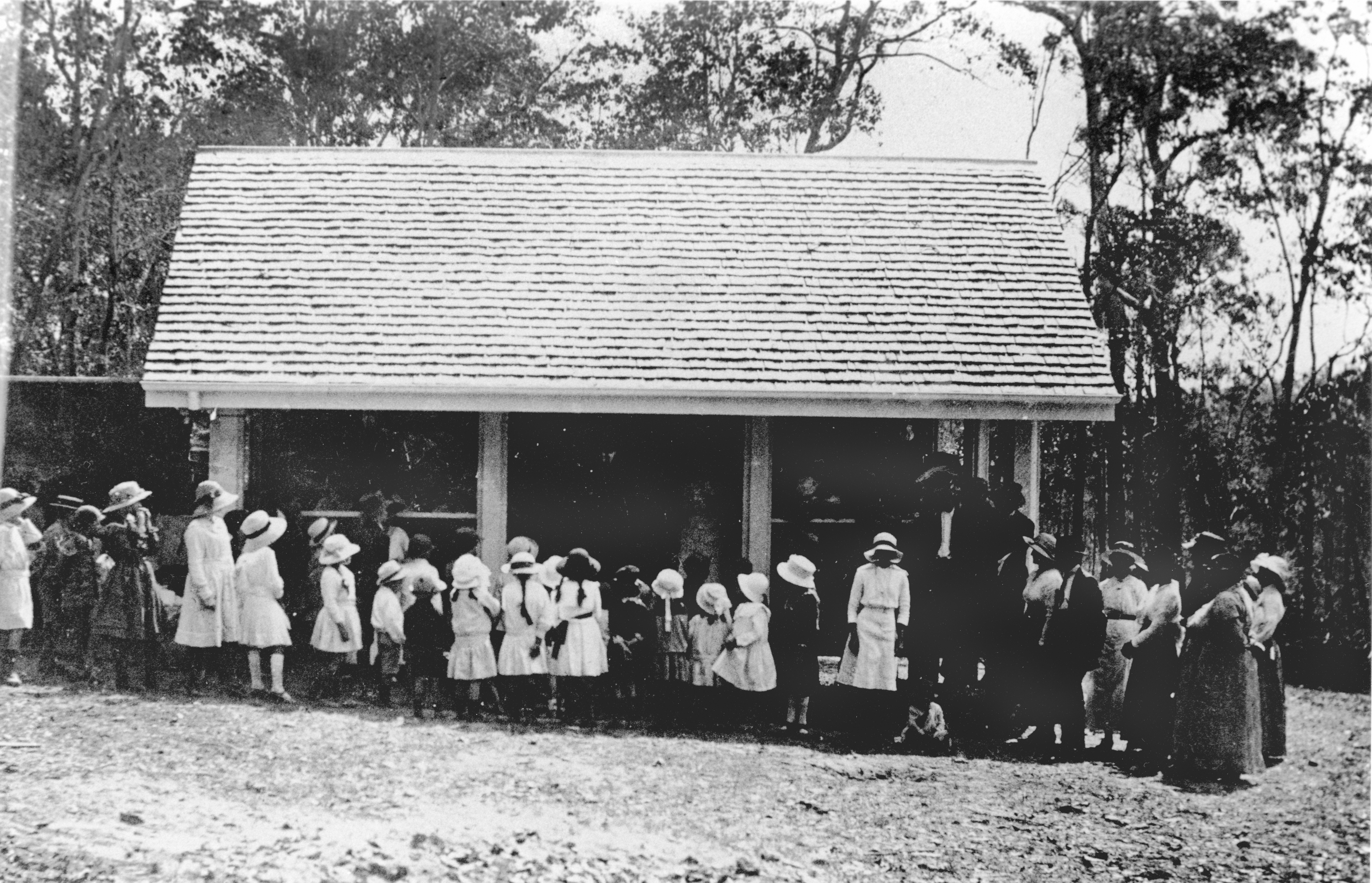
Opening of Antigua State School, 1918

Antigua State School opened on 20 August 1918 and closed on 31 March 1937.

== Demographics ==
In the 2011 census, Antigua had a population of 278 people.

In the 2016 census, Antigua had a population of 127 people.

In the 2021 census, Antigua had a population of 126 people.

== Education ==
There are no schools in Antigua. The nearest government primary school is Mungar State School in neighbouring Mungar to the north. The nearest government secondary school is Aldridge State High School in Maryborough to the north-west.

== Amenities ==
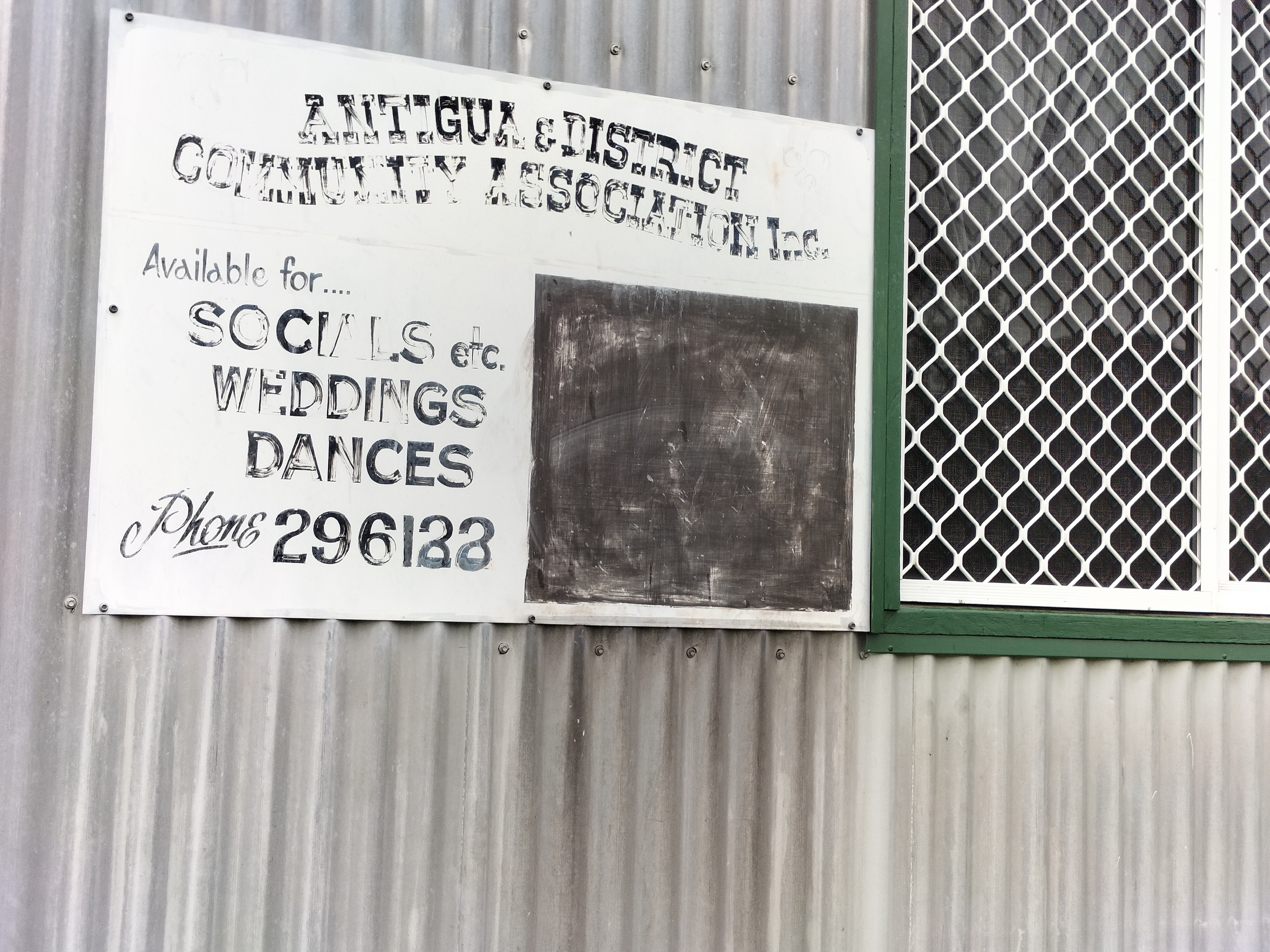
Sign on Antigua Hall, 2023

Antigua Community Hall is on Mungar Road (25.6340°S 152.5839°E).
