= Mungar railway station =

Former railway station in Queensland, Australia

Mungar

General information
- Location: Mungar Terrace, Mungar, Queensland
- Lines: North Coast Line; Mungar Junction to Monto railway line
- Connections: no connections

History
- Closed: Yes

Services
Preceding station	Queensland Rail	Following station
Owanyilla towards Brisbane	North Coast line	Maryborough West towards Cairns
Terminus	Monto line	Pilerwa towards Monto
Station is 243.37 km (151.22 mi) from Central
Location

Mungar railway station (also known as Mungar Junction railway station) is a closed railway station on the North Coast railway line, Queensland, Australia. It was the station at which the now closed Mungar Junction to Monto railway line branched from the North Coast line, giving it the name Mungar Junction.
