= North Aramara, Queensland =

Suburb of Fraser Coast Region, Queensland, Australia

North Aramara
- Suburb
- Interactive map of North Aramara
- Coordinates: 25.5525°S 152.3358°E
- Country: Australia
- State: Queensland
- LGA: Fraser Coast Region
- Location: 13.6 km (8.5 mi) NE of Brooweena; 49.6 km (30.8 mi) W of Maryborough; 78.6 km (48.8 mi) SW of Hervey Bay; 287 km (178 mi) N of Brisbane

Government
  - State electorate: Maryborough
  - Federal division: Wide Bay

Area
  - Total: 51.1 km^{2} (19.7 sq mi)

Population
  - Total: 45 (2021 census)
  - Density: 0.881/km^{2} (2.281/sq mi)
- Time zone: UTC+10:00 (AEST)
- Postcode: 4620
Suburbs around North Aramara
Golden Fleece	Doongul	Doongul
Brooweena	North Aramara	Aramara
Brooweena	Aramara	Aramara

North Aramara is a rural locality in the Fraser Coast Region, Queensland, Australia. In the 2021 census, North Aramara had a population of 45 people.

== History ==
Musket Flat Provisional School opened on 29 February 1904. It closed briefly in 1906 as there was no accommodation available for the teacher. In 1908, it was relocated and renamed Bowling Green Provisional School. On 1 January 1909, it became Bowling Green State School. In 1940, it was renamed Aramara North State School. It was on the north-east corner of Musket Flat Road and an unnamed road going east to the Doongul Creek (25.53896°S 152.32513°E). The school was moved to a new site in 1949 and finally permanently closed in 1983. It was on the north-western corner of Upper Bowling Green Road and North Aramara / Musket Flat Road (25.55187°S 152.31842°E). As at 2023, the school buildings are still extant and the site is now the North Aramara Recreation Reserve.

Edward Nichol, timbercutter, and his cousin David Willam Boldery, teamster, both attended Bowling Green School and were killed in action in World War I. The names of these two soldiers are on what is now the North Aramara War Memorial.

== Demographics ==
In the 2016 census, North Aramara had a population of 35 people.

In the 2021 census, North Aramara had a population of 45 people.

== Heritage listings ==
Fraser Coast Regional Council has placed the following sites on its Local Heritage Register:-

- North Aramara Hall at 2 North Aramara Road North Aramara
- Aramara North School and War Memorial at Corner North Aramara and Upper Bowling Green Road, North Aramara

== Education ==
There are no schools in North Aramara. The nearest government primary school is Brooweena State School in neighbouring Brooweena to the south-west. The nearest government secondary school is Aldridge State High School in Maryborough to the east.
