= Grahams Creek, Queensland =

Grahams Creek
- Suburb
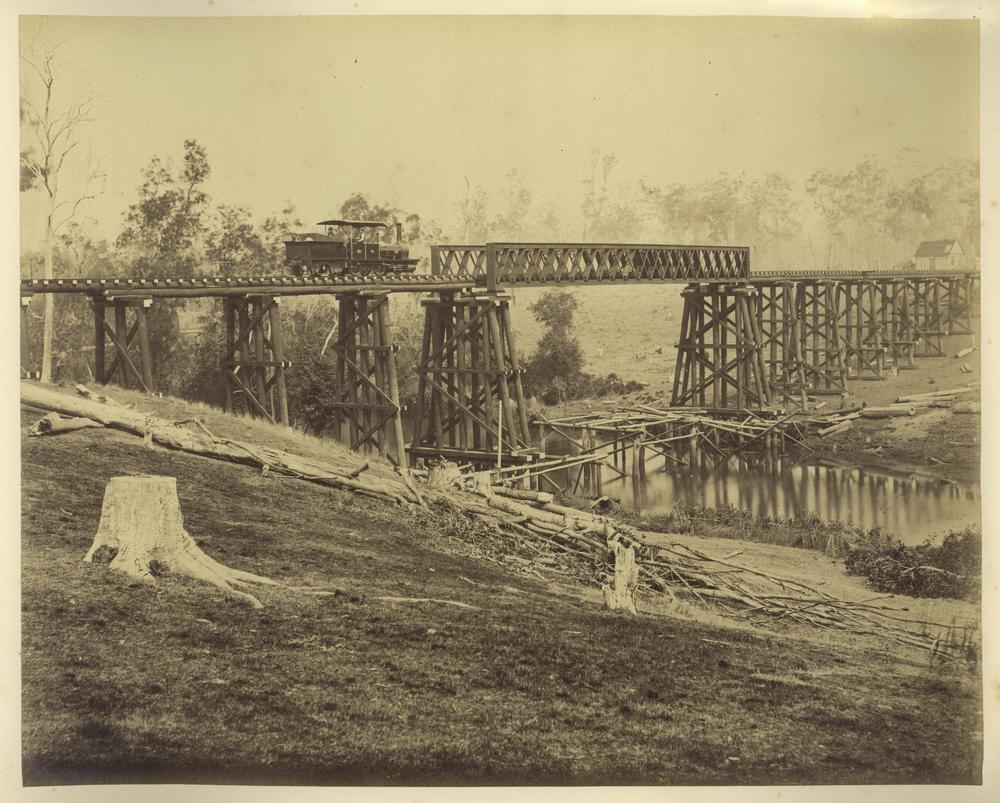
- High trestle railway bridge carrying the North Coast railway line over Grahams Creek, 1882

- Interactive map of Grahams Creek
- Coordinates: 25.5747°S 152.6052°E
- Country: Australia
- State: Queensland
- LGA: Fraser Coast Region
- Location: 16.2 km (10.1 mi) WSW of Maryborough; 45.2 km (28.1 mi) SSW of Hervey Bay; 260 km (160 mi) N of Brisbane

Government
  - State electorate: Maryborough
  - Federal division: Wide Bay

Area
  - Total: 15.4 km^{2} (5.9 sq mi)

Population
  - Total: 149 (2021 census)
  - Density: 9.68/km^{2} (25.06/sq mi)
- Time zone: UTC+10:00 (AEST)
- Postcode: 4650
Suburbs around Grahams Creek
Yengarie	Yengarie	Tinana
Yerra	Grahams Creek	Tinana South
Yerra	Mungar	Mungar

Grahams Creek is a rural locality in the Fraser Coast Region, Queensland, Australia. In the 2021 census, Grahams Creek had a population of 149 people.

== Geography ==
The locality is bounded to the north by the creek Grahams Creek and to the east by the Mary River.

The North Coast railway line enters the locality from the south (Mungar) and exits to the north (Yengarie). The locality was served by the now-abandoned Grahams Creek railway station (25.5701°S 152.6017°E).

The land use is a mixture of grazing on native vegetation, crop growing, and rural residential housing.

== History ==
The locality takes its name from its former railway station, which in turn was derived from the creek name. The creek in turn takes its name from pastoralist Hugh Graham who established the Marianna pastoral run in 1848.

The construction of the railway line from Gympie to Maryborough in the late 1870s (now part of the North Coast railway line) was delayed by the difficulties of crossing Graham's Creek (25.5616°S 152.6091°E) which required considerable ingenuity to construct a bridge. The line was officially opened in August 1881.

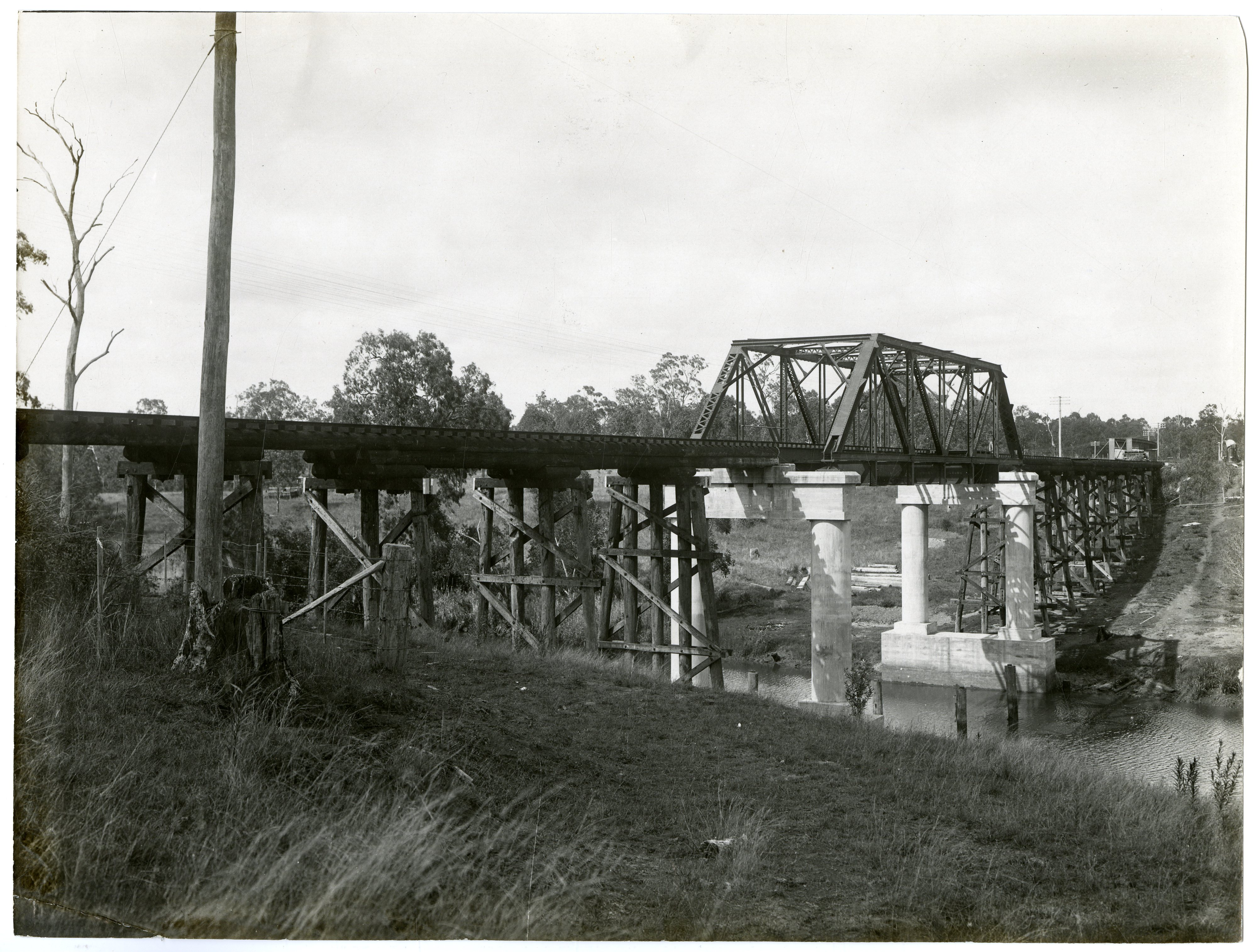
The improved Grahams Creek Bridge, 1916

In 1916, the railway bridge's superstructure was replaced and the bridge strengthened. This was to enable the use of the heavier B17 class locomotives.

In May 2012, a 3.5-metre (11 ft) saltwater crocodile was found in the Mary River between Brothers Island and the mainland near the locality of Beaver Rock, significantly further south than the normal range for such a crocodile. As per Queensland Government policy, crocodiles spotted south of the Boyne River are trapped and relocated to their natural habitat by wildlife official. However, the crocodile eluded the trap for many months, with wildlife officials reporting confirmed sightings of a second smaller crocodile in the river in July 2013. The smaller female crocodile was trapped in November 2013. In November 2014, the larger male crocodile was harpooned approximately 30 kilometres (19 mi) up the river at Grahams Creek to be relocated to Koorana crocodile farm at Rockhampton.

== Demographics ==
In the 2016 census, Grahams Creek had a population of 157 people.

In the 2021 census, Grahams Creek had a population of 149 people.

== Education ==
There are no schools in Grahams Creek. The nearest government primary school is Mungar State School in neighbouring Mungar to the south. The nearest government secondary school is Aldridge State High School in Maryborough to the north-east.
