= Woocoo, Queensland =

Woocoo
- Suburb
- Interactive map of Woocoo
- Coordinates: 25.6566°S 152.3566°E
- Country: Australia
- State: Queensland
- LGA: Fraser Coast Region
- Location: 12.3 km (7.6 mi) SE of Brooweena; 48.1 km (29.9 mi) WSW of Maryborough; 77.2 km (48.0 mi) SW of Hervey Bay; 293 km (182 mi) N of Brisbane

Government
  - State electorate: Maryborough
  - Federal division: Wide Bay

Area
  - Total: 98.0 km^{2} (37.8 sq mi)

Population
  - Total: 56 (2021 census)
  - Density: 0.571/km^{2} (1.480/sq mi)
- Time zone: UTC+10:00 (AEST)
- Postcode: 4620
Suburbs around Woocoo
Aramara	Aramara	Thinoomba
Brooweena	Woocoo	St Mary
Gigoomgan	Glenbar	Glenbar

Woocoo is a rural locality in the Fraser Coast Region, Queensland, Australia. In the 2021 census, Woocoo had a population of 56 people.

== Geography ==
Woocoo consists of three valleys separated by hills. In the south-west the valley is formed by Munna Creek (which is the western boundary of the locality) which is accessible via the Glenbar Road coming from Glenbar to the south. The other two valleys are more centrally located within the locality and are accessed via Ellerslie Road coming from Aramara to the north.

The Woocoo National Park is in the north-west of the locality while a large area of land in the north-east of the locality is part of the St Mary State Forest. Mount Woocoo (240 metres above sea level) is located in the state forest. The land in the valleys is freehold and used as small farms, while the hillier parts of the locality are undeveloped.

== History ==
The locality name Woocoo presumably takes its name from Mount Woocoo which was in turn is believed to be a corruption of the Kabi word woocoon meaning echidna.

Baemar Provisional School opened in 1901 but closed in 1922 due to low student numbers. It reopened in 1924 but closed again on 1 July 1935 with the students transferred to the new Woocoo State School which opened on 10 July 1935. Woocoo State School closed in 1961.

== Demographics ==
In the 2016 census, Woocoo had a population of 48 people.

In the 2021 census, Woocoo had a population of 56 people.

== Education ==
There are no schools in Woocoo. The nearest government primary school is Brooweena State School in neighbouring Brooweena to the west. The nearest government secondary school is Aldridge State High School in Maryborough to the north-east. There are also non-government schools in Maryborough.
