= Pilerwa, Queensland =

Pilerwa
- Suburb
- Interactive map of Pilerwa
- Coordinates: 25.6055°S 152.5638°E
- Country: Australia
- State: Queensland
- LGA: Fraser Coast Region
- Location: 23.0 km (14.3 mi) SW of Maryborough; 52.0 km (32.3 mi) SW of Hervey Bay; 269 km (167 mi) N of Brisbane

Government
  - State electorate: Maryborough
  - Federal division: Wide Bay

Area
  - Total: 6.9 km^{2} (2.7 sq mi)

Population
  - Total: 50 (2021 census)
  - Density: 7.2/km^{2} (18.8/sq mi)
- Time zone: UTC+10:00 (AEST)
- Postcode: 4650
Suburbs around Pilerwa
Yerra	Yerra	Mungar
Yerra	Pilerwa	Mungar
Yerra	Yerra	Antigua

Pilerwa is a rural locality in the Fraser Coast Region, Queensland, Australia. In the 2021 census, Pilerwa had a population of 50 people.

== Geography ==
The land use is a mixture of grazing on native vegetation, crop growing (mostly sugarcane), and rural residential housing.

== Demographics ==
In the 2016 census, Pilerwa had a population of 51 people.

In the 2021 census, Pilerwa had a population of 50 people.

== Education ==
There are no schools in Pilerwa. The nearest government primary school is Mungar State School in neighbouring Mungar to the east. The nearest government secondary school is Aldridge State High School in Maryborough to the north-east. There are also non-government schools in Maryborough.
