= Yengarie Sugar Refinery Ruins =

Yengarie Sugar Refinery
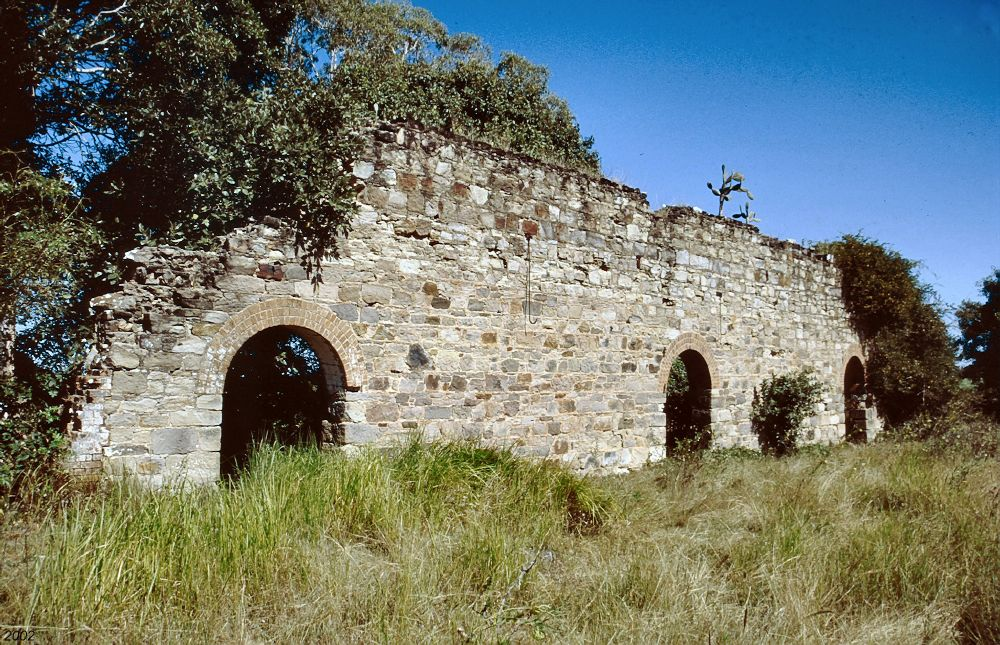
- Yengarie Sugar Refinery ruins, 2002

- Location within Queensland Location within Australia
- 25.5611°S 152.6162°E
- Location: Old Mill Road, Yengarie, Fraser Coast Region, Queensland, Australia

History
- Design period: 1840s–1860s (mid-19th century)
- Built: c. 1867–c. 1883

Queensland Heritage Register
- Official name: Yengarie Sugar Refinery ruins
- Type: state heritage (archaeological)
- Designated: 21 October 1992
- Reference no.: 600970
- Significant period: 1867–1883 (fabric); 1867–1899 (historical)
- Significant components: mounting block/stand, pit – machinery, embankment – tramway, tank – water

Yengarie Sugar Refinery is a heritage-listed refinery at Old Mill Road, Yengarie, Fraser Coast Region, Queensland, Australia. It was built from c. 1867 to c. 1883. It was added to the Queensland Heritage Register on 21 October 1992.

== History ==
The ruins of the Sugar Refinery on Graham's Creek at Yengarie are the remains of an important industrial complex, which began operations for the firm of Tooth and Cran in the 1860s. It produced meat extract before working as a sugar mill and then as a major refinery that serviced many plantations and mills in the area before closing in 1899.

Robert Tooth was born in 1821 and was the son of a hop merchant in Kent and nephew of a Sydney merchant and brewer who also owned numerous cattle runs. Robert and Edwin Tooth leased their uncle's Tooth and Co. brewery in 1843 and were joined by their brother Frederick in 1853. Robert speculated in pastoral properties and gold during the 1850s and was briefly involved with politics in New South Wales. He was also Director of the Bank of New South Wales in the 1850s and 1860s and Director of the Colonial Sugar Refining Company, of which he was a major shareholder, between 1855 and 1863. He owned several pastoral properties in Queensland and in 1857 employed Robert Cran, first on Jondaryan Station and then as a supervisor at Pikedale.

Cran was the same age as Tooth and had come to Queensland from Scotland in 1849. He first worked as a stockman and was employed on several properties by Tooth until he became manager of Tooth's boiling down works and abattoir at Yengarie in 1865.

When the Maryborough Agricultural Reserve was thrown open for selection in March 1862, one of the first selectors was W C Giles, acting as agent for Robert Tooth of Widgee Widgee Station, who bought Lots 3 & 4 fronting the Mary River immediately below Graham's Creek. Tooth sold Widgee Widgee to JC White, who was his manager at Jondaryan. White set up a steam-powered abattoir and boiling-down works on the Yengarie land in 1863 but was financially ruined when pleuropneumonia killed most of his cattle the following year. Tooth foreclosed on both the station and land. Robert Cran then took on the mortgage of Widgee Widgee and Giles leased the Yengarie land for agistment, though he also became insolvent in 1865.

Tooth was interested in the preservation of beef before refrigeration was available, and the boiling-down works was adapted with modern equipment as a meat extract plant, using Leibig's process. Tooth and Cran went into partnership with F F Nixon, Robert Lucas Tooth and Frederick Tooth as Tooth and Cran, the meat extract they produced winning a prize at the Intercolonial Exhibition in Sydney in 1870 and also receiving a prize at Amsterdam. By 1867 Yengarie had become a major business enterprise with bone crushing, wool washing and hide tanning divisions surrounded by what had become a small settlement.

Sugar was becoming increasingly important in the area, and in 1867 Cran let contracts for clearing and planting cane and prepared to erect a sugar mill to work in conjunction with the meat extract factory. The first boiling in open pans began in October 1868. This produced a small-grained white sugar, immediately recognised as the best sugar available in the Maryborough area at the time. In 1869 a superior new process was installed under the supervision of Tooth, who was modern and innovative in his approach. The works at Yengarie were continually upgraded to keep pace with new developments and an increasing workload.

In 1870 the mill was expanded. New and larger boilers were installed and charcoal retorts added to utilise bone waste for refining sugar. A distillery was installed and J T Annear constructed a brick chimney. From 1871 Yengarie operated as a refinery, juice being supplied by mills in the surrounding area, many of which were constructed in the 1870s. The partners owned plantations at Yengarie, Yerra Yerra and Irrawarra. Melanesian indentured labourers were employed in both the refinery and at the plantations, as they were on surrounding properties.

With the increasing emphasis on sugar in the district, it was decided to close the meat extracting works in 1873. In the same year a horse-drawn tramway was constructed to the mill for conveying firewood, cane and later, juice. Juice mills were central to the sugar making process at Maryborough and by 1883, 28 small mills were sending juice to Yengarie by punt or through a network of pipes. At the height of its production, Yengarie produced three grades of sugar, rum, treacle and tar. The refinery became a very large undertaking comprising a factory, store, laboratory, distillery, brickworks, limekilns and wharves with a small township developing to accommodate workers and their families. Tooth and Cran also had their own steamer, the Nowra, which took sugar and rum to Maryborough for shipment south. From the 1870s gas produced to light the refinery was also piped to light the township, a luxury not then available in Maryborough.

In 1875, the partnership with Nixon and Croft, the manager of Yerra Yerra, was dissolved and Tooth left for England, leaving Cran in charge. Tooth began a new refinery, also called Yengarie, in the Philippines in his own name. The Tooth and Cran partnership was dissolved in 1879 and Robert Cran and Company ran Yengarie. In 1880 Cran spent some time in Europe arranging for machinery for a new refinery he planned to build in Bundaberg. This was opened in 1883 as Millaquin and Cran provided land at Yengarie for a short branch line and siding to connect the complex to the state railway. In 1885 there were 40 mills and 5 distilleries along the Mary River, although production and sugar prices began to fall. In 1889 Cran and Company opened a crushing mill at Doolbi to provide juice to Yengarie, thereby supporting the development of cane growing in the Isis area.

The 1890s brought problems due to depressed sugar prices and major changes in the sugar industry. Central mills servicing independent white farmers replaced the big plantations run by indentured labour, licenses to recruit Melanesian workers having ceased after December 1890. A number of plantations and mills closed and, by 1892, it was reported that much of the land along the Mary River was no longer under cultivation, or was growing crops other than sugar. The major flood in 1893 also damaged plantations and farms along the river and caused severe damage to the refinery. When Robert Cran died on 16 December 1894 he was insolvent and the Queensland National Bank took over his assets. The Yengarie site was permanently closed in 1899 and the land at Yerra Yerra, Irrawarra and Yengarie was cut up and sold between 1905 and 1908. James Mahoney, who owned a butchering business next to Yengarie, had occupied the land since 1900 and purchased it in 1908, using it for dairying, which became a major business in the area. His great grandson still owns the land.

The roof of the main refinery building was destroyed by fire and storm in the 1930s and 1940s. Numerous galvanised iron sheds at the southern end of the refinery were removed, as were worker's houses, a butcher's shop and a smithy associated with the refinery. Part of the refinery building was used as a cattle dip until the early 1950s. Over the years the machinery was removed and dispersed. The boilers were the last major piece of equipment to be removed and were sold for scrap in 1964. The brick chimney, having become unsafe, was demolished in 1983. Evidence for the placement of machinery can still be seen in the form of concrete mountings, pits and shafts.

The front and one side wall of the main building and sections of the other walls remain, though invaded by vegetation, particularly by a number of large fig trees growing within the building which have given the ruins a picturesque quality.

== Description ==
The refinery ruins are located on Graham's Creek, a tributary of the Mary River, 1 kilometre (0.62 mi) south east of Yengarie siding and 9 kilometres (5.6 mi) south west of Maryborough. There were once wharves on the creek but these are not now evident.

The most striking feature of the site is the standing ruin of the main refinery building, measuring approximately 32 by 20 metres (105 ft × 66 ft), as sections of brick, stone and pise walls on pise foundations. Most of the front wall remains and is pierced by a series of openings with round arched heads. Most of the wall on the side facing the river also remains standing but the other walls have collapsed. The building contains a large tank and several mature fig trees, the roots of which have penetrated the walls and foundations. The walls are buckled and slumped and have several large vertical cracks.

Concrete mounts for equipment are visible on the north eastern side of the building and although much of the site is overgrown with vegetation, it is believed that other evidence of use remains, including pits and a shaft leading down to a water channel. The presence of these obscured pits prevented safe inspection of some parts of the site. The area is scattered with loose bricks, some of which were made on site and are considerably more friable than others that bear the imprint of Brown & Sons of Paisley or manganese bricks from the chimney. Rubble from the machinery shed forms a mound about 100 metres (330 ft) behind the refinery building. Maintenance sheds were to the north of the refinery building.

The line along which the tram track passed is visible approximately 20 metres (66 ft) in front of the building. Other sections of line ran behind the mill and to the west, but these cannot readily be seen.

== Heritage listing ==
Yengarie Sugar Refinery ruins was listed on the Queensland Heritage Register on 21 October 1992 having satisfied the following criteria.

The place is important in demonstrating the evolution or pattern of Queensland's history.

The ruins of Yengarie Sugar Refinery are evidence for a major early industrial enterprise that made an important contribution to the development of the sugar industry in Queensland.

The place has potential to yield information that will contribute to an understanding of Queensland's history.

The ruins of Yengarie Sugar Refinery and surroundings have the potential to reveal further information about the operation of both the sugar and meat works industries in Queensland in the 19th century.

The place has a special association with the life or work of a particular person, group or organisation of importance in Queensland's history.

It is important for its association with the life and works of Robert Tooth and Robert Cran, who made a significant contribution to the development of the sugar industry in Queensland.
