= Maryborough West, Queensland =

Maryborough West Maryborough, Queensland
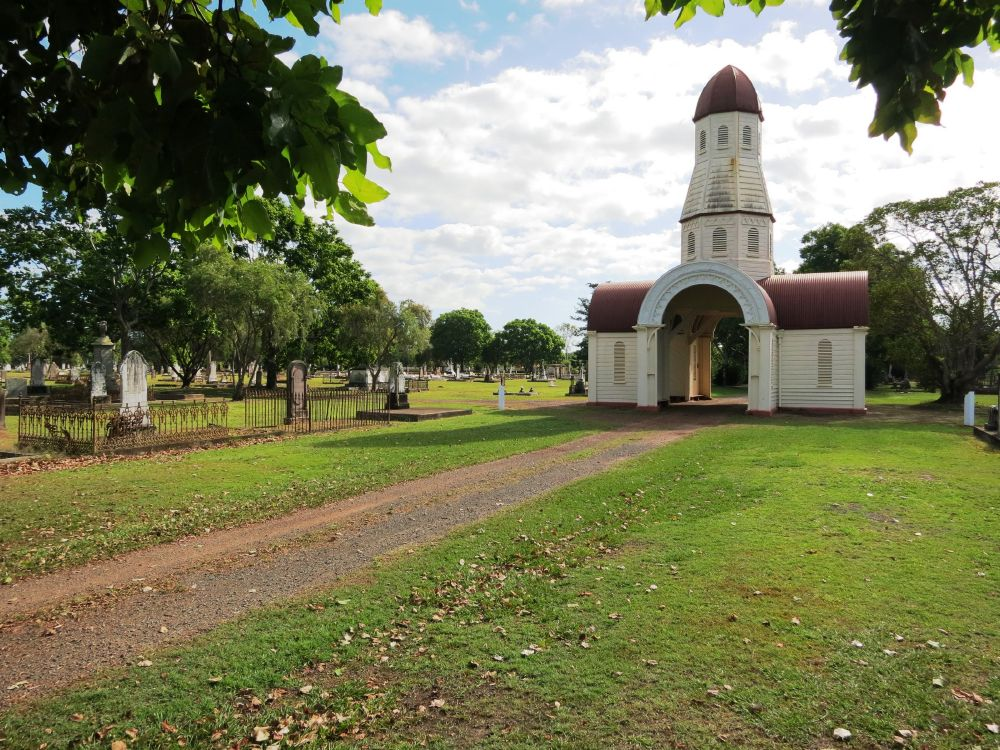
- Mortuary Chapel in the Maryborough Cemetery, 2014

- Coordinates: 25.5025°S 152.6705°E
- Population: 568 (2021 census)
  - Density: 71.0/km^{2} (183.9/sq mi)
- Postcode(s): 4650
- Area: 8.0 km^{2} (3.1 sq mi)
- Time zone: AEST (UTC+10:00)
- Location: 5.3 km (3 mi) NW of Maryborough; 34.3 km (21 mi) SSW of Hervey Bay; 253 km (157 mi) N of Brisbane
- LGA(s): Fraser Coast Region
- State electorate(s): Maryborough
- Federal division(s): Wide Bay
Suburbs around Maryborough West:
Oakhurst	Aldershot	Maryborough
Oakhurst	Maryborough West	Maryborough
Tinana	Maryborough	Maryborough

Maryborough West is a mixed-use locality in the Fraser Coast Region, Queensland, Australia. In the 2021 census, Maryborough West had a population of 568 people.

== Geography ==
The Mary River forms the south-western boundary of the locality.

There is residential housing near the river, but the locality is predominantly used for other purposes, including industrial estates, the Maryborough Showgrounds (25.5064°S 152.6627°E), and the heritage-listed Maryborough Cemetery (25.5159°S 152.6746°E).

The Bruce Highway passes through the locality from the south-west (Tinana) to the north (Aldershot).

== History ==
Maryborough Christian Academy opened as a primary school on 1 February 1983 at the Maryborough Christian Outreach Centre and expanded over time, being renamed Riverside Christian College in 2002.

== Demographics ==
In the 2016 census, Maryborough West had a population of 531 people.

In the 2021 census, Maryborough West had a population of 568 people.

== Education ==
Riverside Christian College is a private primary and secondary (Prep–12) school at 23 Royle Street (25.5177°S 152.6645°E).

There are no government schools in Maryborough West. The nearest government primary school is Sunbury State School in neighbouring Maryborough to the south-east. The nearest government secondary school is Aldridge State High School in Maryborough to the east.

== Amenities ==
The Maryborough Showgrounds and Equestrian Park is located on the Bruce Highway at Maryborough West.

LifeChurch Maryborough is at 68 Gayndah Road (25.5168°S 152.6640°E). It is part of the Wesleyan Methodist Church of Australia.
