= Maryborough West railway station =

Railway station in Queensland, Australia

Maryborough West
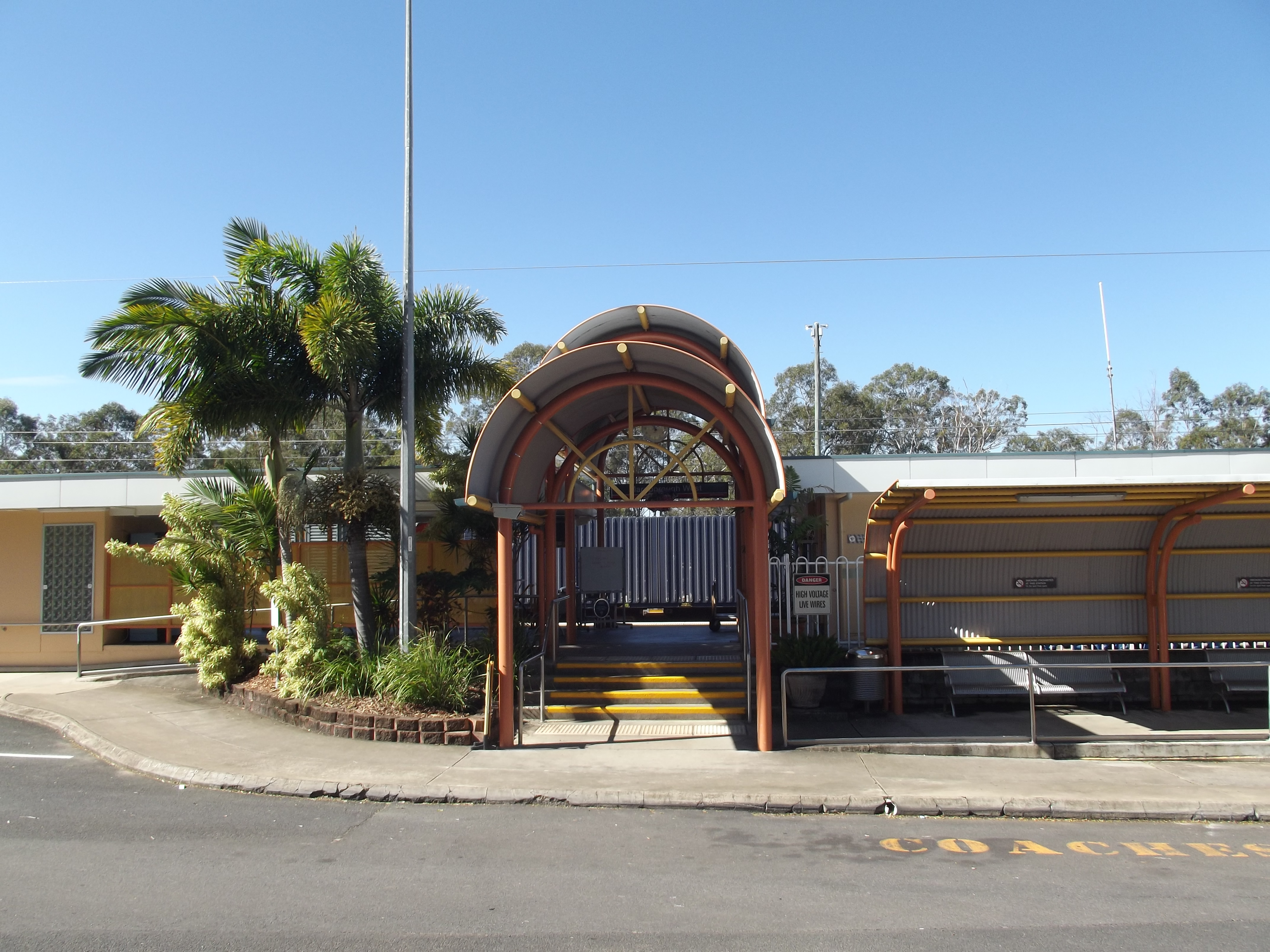
- Station front in July 2012

General information
- Location: Maryborough-Biggenden Road, Oakhurst
- Coordinates: 25°30′28″S 152°38′12″E
- Owner: Queensland Rail
- Operator: Traveltrain
- Line: North Coast
- Distance: 255.59 kilometres from Central
- Platforms: 1
- Tracks: 3

Construction
- Structure type: Ground
- Accessible: Yes

History
- Opened: 1989

Services
Preceding station	Queensland Rail	Following station
Gympie North towards Brisbane	Spirit of Queensland	Howard towards Cairns
Gympie North towards Brisbane	Tilt Train	Howard towards Rockhampton
Gympie North towards Brisbane	Spirit of the Outback	Bundaberg towards Longreach

Former services
~~Mungar~~	North Coast line	~~Colton~~
Location

Maryborough West railway station is located on the North Coast line in Oakhurst, Fraser Coast Region, Queensland, Australia. It serves the city of Maryborough.

== History ==
Maryborough West was opened in 1989 as a replacement for Maryborough and Baddow stations, when the latter was bypassed by a new seven kilometre alignment that was built as part of the electrification of the North Coast line.

The station consists of one platform. Opposite the platform lie two crossing loops. South of the station, the old line to Maryborough station branches off. This remains in use to serve the Downer Rail railway workshops.

== Services ==
Maryborough West is served by long-distance Traveltrain services; the Spirit of Queensland, Spirit of the Outback and the Tilt Train.

A Queensland Rail shuttle bus operates between the station and the former Maryborough station. A connecting road coach service operated by Wide Bay Transit also operates to Hervey Bay.
