= St Mary, Queensland =

St Mary
- Suburb
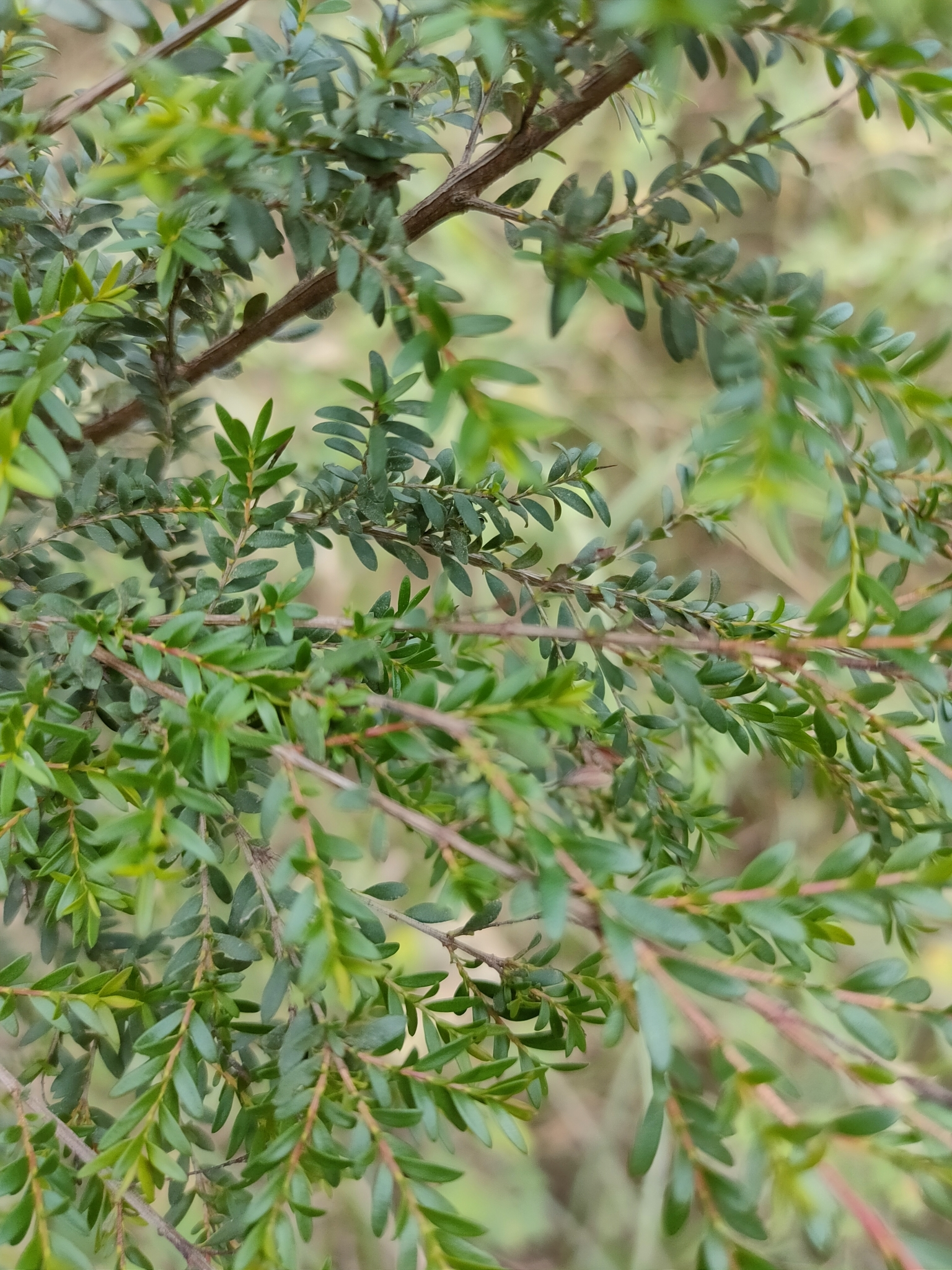
- Sannantha bidwillii in St Mary, 2022

- Interactive map of St Mary
- Coordinates: 25.6872°S 152.4883°E
- Country: Australia
- State: Queensland
- LGA: Fraser Coast Region
- Location: 4.2 km (2.6 mi) W of Tiaro; 30.2 km (18.8 mi) SW of Maryborough; 63.3 km (39.3 mi) SSW of Hervey Bay; 229 km (142 mi) N of Brisbane

Government
  - State electorate: Maryborough
  - Federal division: Wide Bay

Area
  - Total: 185.4 km^{2} (71.6 sq mi)

Population
  - Total: 34 (2021 census)
  - Density: 0.1834/km^{2} (0.475/sq mi)
- Time zone: UTC+10:00 (AEST)
- Postcode: 4570
Suburbs around St Mary
Woocoo	Thinoomba; Yerra	Antigua; Pioneers Rest
Woocoo	St Mary	Tiaro
Glenbar	Mount Urah	Netherby

St Mary is a rural locality in the Fraser Coast Region, Queensland, Australia. In the 2021 census, St Mary had a population of 34 people.

== Geography ==
The Mary River forms the southern and south-eastern boundary of the locality. Its tributary Ooramera Creek forms part of the south-western boundary of the locality.

St Mary has the following mountains:

- Mount Bererum in the north-west of the locality (25.6312°S 152.4103°E), rising 238 metres (781 ft) above sea level
- Mount Benarige in the centre of the locality (25.6920°S 152.4615°E), 251 metres (823 ft)

The St Mary State Forests 1, 2 and 3 occupy most of the locality, particularly in the north and west of the locality. Apart from these protected areas, the land use is predominantly grazing on native vegetation with some irrigated crop growing and rural residential housing in areas close to the Mary River.

== History ==
St Mary's Provisional School opened on 17 October 1949 within the forestry reserve. It closed on 26 August 1955. It was on the western side of Thinoomba Road (approx 25.65463°S 152.44788°E). The location was later redeveloped by Maryborough State High School as the Sandy Creek Outdoor Learning Centre.

== Demographics ==
In the 2016 census, St Mary had a population of 73 people.

In the 2021 census, St Mary had a population of 34 people.

== Education ==
There are no schools in St Mary. The nearest government primary schools are Tiaro State School in neighbouring Tiaro to the east and Gundiah State School in Gundiah to the south-east. The nearest government secondary school is Maryborough State High School in Maryborough to the north-east.

There are also a number of non-government schools in Maryborough and its suburbs.

== Attractions ==
The Sandy Creek Centre is near the site of the former provisional school. It offers basic camping and youth programs.

Victory Village at Riverbend offers visitors a working medieval village at 19 Riverbend Road (25.7557°S 152.4929°E).
