= Mungar =

- Suburb
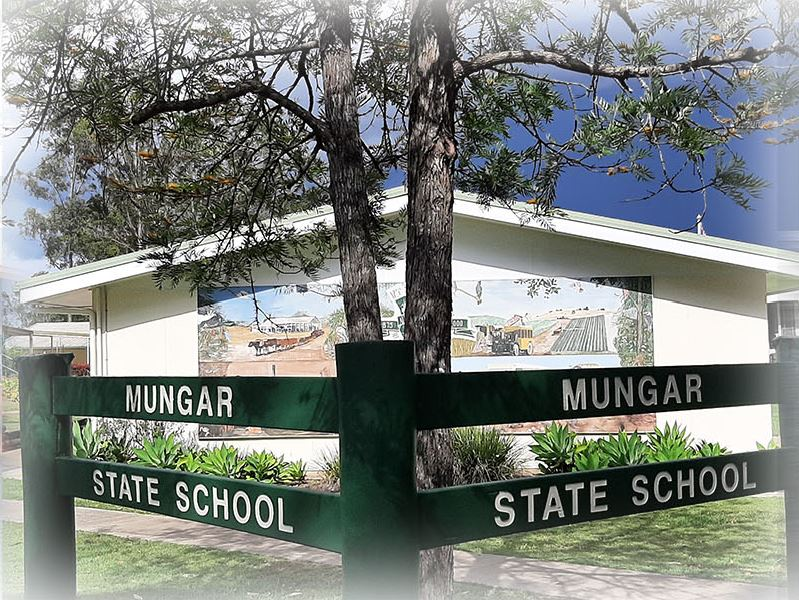
- Mungar State School, 2023

- Interactive map of Mungar
- Coordinates: 25.6027°S 152.5944°E
- Country: Australia
- State: Queensland
- LGA: Fraser Coast Region
- Location: 19.7 km (12.2 mi) SW of Maryborough; 48.7 km (30.3 mi) SW of Hervey Bay; 77.5 km (48.2 mi) N of Gympie; 256 km (159 mi) N of Brisbane

Government
  - State electorate: Maryborough
  - Federal division: Wide Bay

Area
  - Total: 15.2 km^{2} (5.9 sq mi)

Population
  - Total: 328 (2021 census)
  - Density: 21.58/km^{2} (55.89/sq mi)
- Time zone: UTC+10:00 (AEST)
- Postcode: 4650
Suburbs around Mungar
Yerra	Grahams Creek	Tinana South
Pilerwa	Mungar	Ferney
Antigua	Antigua	Ferney

Mungar is a rural locality in the Fraser Coast Region, Queensland, Australia. In the 2021 census, Mungar had a population of 328 people.

== Geography ==
Mungar is 256 kilometres (159 mi) north of the state capital Brisbane and 19.7 kilometres (12.2 mi) south west of the regional centre of Maryborough.

The locality is bounded to the east by the Mary River.

Mungar Road traverses the locality from north to south.

The North Coast railway line enters the locality from the south (Antigua) and exits to the north (Grahams Creek). It is west of Mungar Road. The locality is served by the Mungar railway station (25.6033°S 152.5940°E).

== History ==
Mary River Saw Mill Provisional School opened on 9 July 1875. On 24 September 1877, it was renamed Mungar State School.

The Mungar Junction to Monto Branch Railway branched from the North Coast railway line at Mungar railway station. The first section of the line from Mungar to Teebar (now known as Brooweena) opened on 29 July 1889. The final opening of the line through to its terminus in Monto was on 15 September 1928. The last train ran on the branch railway in 2008 and the line was officially closed in 2012.

== Demographics ==
At the 2011 census, Mungar and the surrounding area had a population of 264.

In the 2016 census, Mungar had a population of 309 people.

In the 2021 census, Mungar had a population of 328 people.

== Education ==
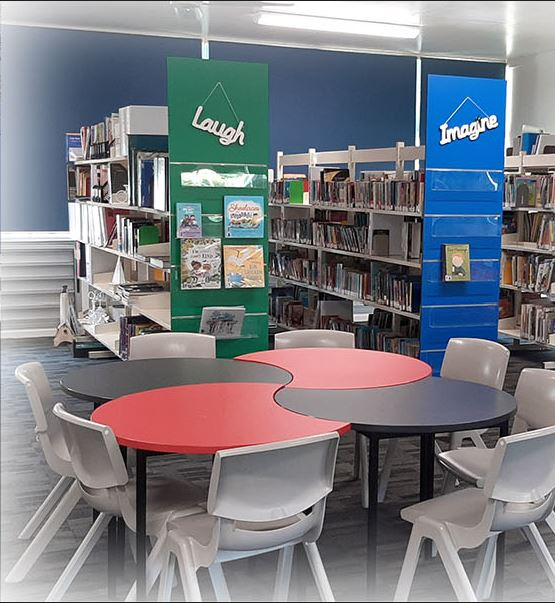
Mungar State School library, 2023

Mungar State School is a government primary (Prep-6) school for boys and girls at 1143 Mungar Road (25.6041°S 152.5906°E). In 2017, the school had an enrolment of 44 students with 3 teachers (2 full-time equivalent) and 4 non-teaching staff (3 full-time equivalent). In 2018, the school had an enrolment of 52 students with 4 teachers (3 full-time equivalent) and 6 non-teaching staff (4 full-time equivalent).

There are no secondary schools in Mungar. The nearest government secondary school is Aldridge State High School in Maryborough to the north-east.
