= Shire of Tiaro =

Coordinates: 25°43′39″S 152°34′55″E

- Local government area
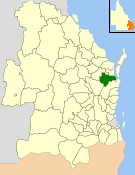
- Location within Queensland

- Country: Australia
- State: Queensland
- Region: Wide Bay–Burnett
- Established: 1879
- Council seat: Tiaro

Area
  - Total: 2,185.3 km^{2} (843.7 sq mi)

Population
  - Total: 5,233 (2006 census)
  - Density: 2.39464/km^{2} (6.2021/sq mi)
- Website: Shire of Tiaro
LGAs around Shire of Tiaro
Woocoo	Woocoo	Maryborough
Woocoo	Shire of Tiaro	Great Sandy Strait
Kilkivan	Cooloola	Cooloola

The Shire of Tiaro was a local government area in the Wide Bay–Burnett region of Queensland, Australia, between the regional cities of Gympie and Hervey Bay about 220 kilometres (137 mi) north of the state capital, Brisbane. The shire covered an area of 2,185.3 square kilometres (843.7 sq mi), and existed as a local government area from 1879 until 2008, when it was dissolved and split between two new local government areas, the Gympie Region and the Fraser Coast Region.

The name "Tiaro" is of Aboriginal origin, meaning withered or dead tree. 43 per cent of the Shire was covered by State forest. The main industries in the shire were sugar, beef and dairy cattle, orchards and timber felling and milling.

== History ==
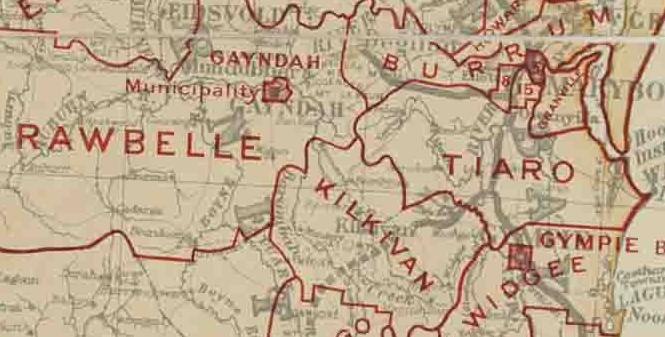
Map of Tiaro Division and adjacent local government areas, March 1902. Legend: Maryborough Municipality (3), Antigua Division (8), Tinana Division (15)

Tiaro Division was created on 11 November 1879 as one of the initial 74 divisions around Queensland under the Divisional Boards Act 1879 with a population of 1852.

On 9 February 1884, following a petition by the ratepayers of subdivisions Nos. 2 and 3 of Tiaro Division, part of Tiaro Division was excised to establish a separate municipality called the Shire of Tiaro. The Tiaro Divisional Board were opposed to the creation of the shire, and had attempted various legal actions to prevent it. The new shire started life in an immediate dispute with the division over the apportionment of the accounts. One of the early actions of the Shire Council was to commission the construction of a shire hall, which many of their ratepayers saw as an unnecessary expense. By April 1886, the ratepayers were petitioning to abolish the Shire. As a result, on 16 December 1886, the shire was abolished and the territory returned to authority of the Tiaro Division.

With the passage of the Local Authorities Act 1902, Tiaro Division became Shire of Tiaro on 31 March 1903.

On 17 February 1917, as part of a restructuring of local government in the Wide Bay–Burnett area, the Shire of Tiaro absorbed the Shire of Tinana and part of the Shire of Granville which had governed areas to the north and east of Tiaro since the 1880s.

On 15 March 2008, under the Local Government (Reform Implementation) Act 2007 passed by the Parliament of Queensland on 10 August 2007, the Shire of Tiaro was dissolved. Division 3 of the Shire, located generally south of Blowers Road, Wards Road and Ularrah Creek and including the towns of Theebine, Curra and Gunalda, became part of the new Gympie Region together with the Shires of Cooloola and Kilkivan. The other two divisions amalgamated with Woocoo and the Cities of Hervey Bay and Maryborough to create Fraser Coast Region. In doing so, Tiaro became one of the only three former shires in Queensland not to stay intact, alongside Taroom and Beaudesert.

== Economy ==
The Shire of Tiaro was home to the Bauple Sugar Mill, which operated from 1886 until 1951, and was also home to a butter and cheese factory and several juice mills.

== Towns and localities ==
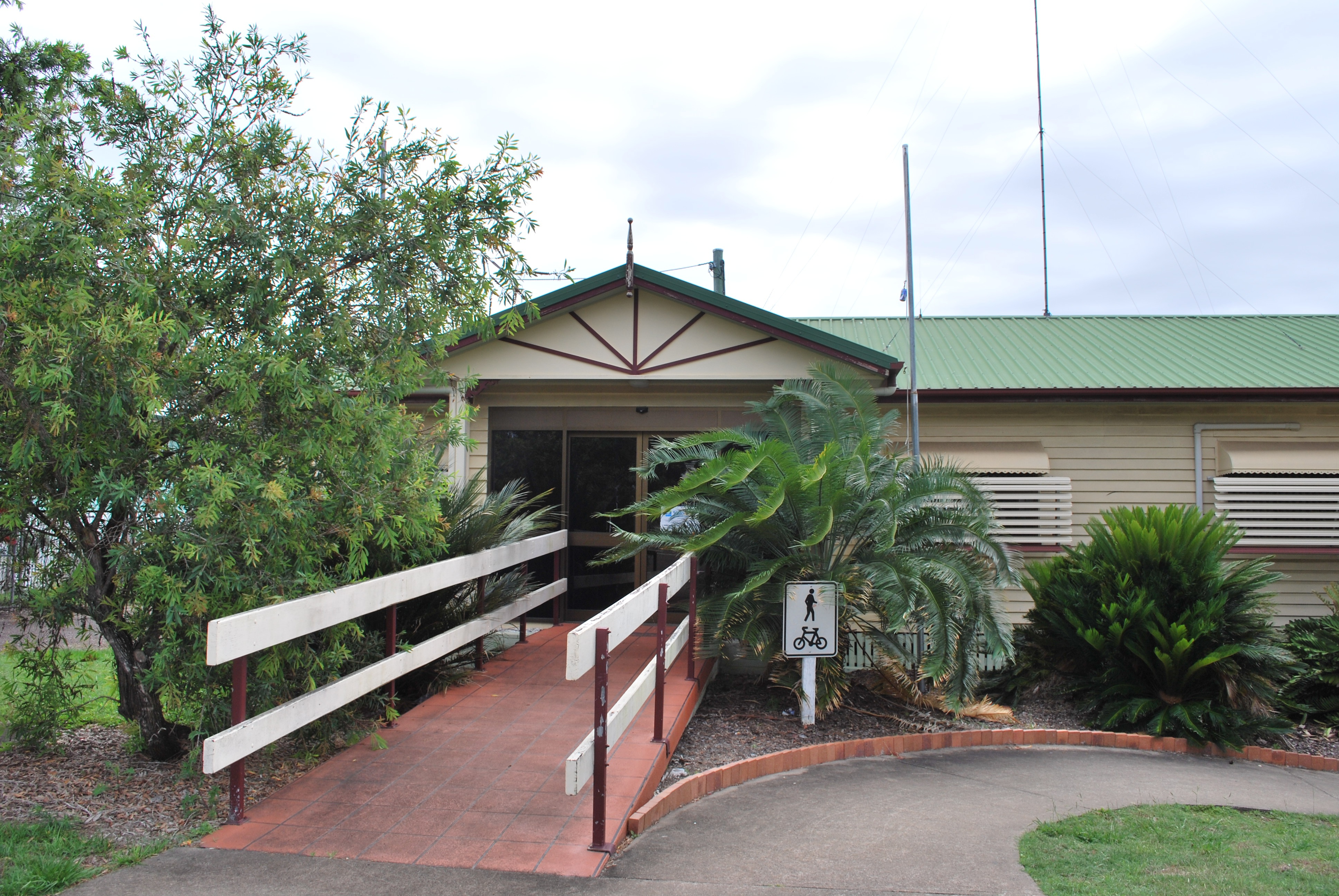
Tiaro Shire Council Offices, 2010

The Shire of Tiaro included the following settlements:

Division 1

- Tiaro
- Antigua
- Blackmount
- Pioneers Rest
- St Mary
- Thinoomba

Division 2

- Bauple
- Bauple Forest
- Glenbar
- Glenwood
- Gootchie
- Gundiah
- Kanigan
- Mount Urah
- Munna Creek
- Netherby
- Paterson
- Talegalla Weir
- Tin Can Bay^{1}
- Tinnanbar

Division 3

- Anderleigh
- Curra
- Glen Echo
- Gunalda
- Miva
- Neerdie
- Scotchy Pocket
- Theebine

^{1} - split with Gympie Region

== Chairmen / Mayors ==
- 1927: Andrew Thompson
- 1961-1985: Thomas Gee
- 1997–2004: John Horrex
- 2004–2008: Linda Harris

== Population ==
Year	Population
1921	2,956
1933	3,143
1947	2,666
1954	2,567
1961	2,205
1966	2,110
1971	1,862
1976	1,875
1981	2,066
1986	2,518
1991	3,287
1996	4,236
2001	4,449
2006	5,323
