= City of Maryborough (Queensland) =

- Local government area
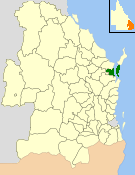
- Location within Queensland

- Country: Australia
- State: Queensland
- Region: Wide Bay–Burnett
- Established: 1861
- Council seat: Maryborough

Area
  - Total: 1,233.9 km^{2} (476.4 sq mi)

Population
  - Total: 25,705 (2006 census)
  - Density: 20.8323/km^{2} (53.955/sq mi)
- Website: City of Maryborough
LGAs around City of Maryborough
Hervey Bay	Hervey Bay	Pacific Ocean
Woocoo	City of Maryborough	Pacific Ocean
Tiaro	Tiaro	Pacific Ocean

The City of Maryborough was a local government area located in the Wide Bay–Burnett region of Queensland, Australia, containing the urban locality of Maryborough as well as the southern half of K'gari. The City covered an area of 1,233.9 square kilometres (476.4 sq mi), and existed as a local government entity from 1861 until 2008, when it was amalgamated with the City of Hervey Bay, Shire of Woocoo and the 1st and 2nd divisions of the Shire of Tiaro to form the Fraser Coast Region.

== History ==
Wharves were established at Maryborough in 1847–1848 to provide transport for wool from sheep stations on the Burnett River. The town was initially located further south on the Mary River, but moved to its present location in 1852. It was declared a port in 1859.

On 10 March 1861, the Municipal Borough of Maryborough, governed under the Municipalities Act 1858 which had been inherited from New South Wales upon the separation of Queensland in 1859, was proclaimed, becoming the sixth municipal government in Queensland. Henry Palmer was appointed as its first Mayor. On 15 September 1883, the Granville Division was established under the Divisional Boards Act 1879 to serve the surrounding district.

With the passing of the Local Authorities Act 1902, on 31 March 1903 the Borough of Maryborough became the Town of Maryborough and Granville Division became the Shire of Granville. On 7 January 1905 Maryborough achieved City status, and a Town Hall was built on the corner of Kent and Adelaide Streets and became the administrative centre of the City. On 17 February 1917, as part of a restructuring of local government in the Wide Bay–Burnett area, the Shire of Granville was abolished and split between the Shire of Tiaro and City of Maryborough.

At the local government elections of 27 March 1976, with the neighbouring Shire of Burrum being renamed Hervey Bay and retreating to the coast, Maryborough changed from being an urban municipality of 26 km^{2} (10 sq mi) to one of 1,115 km^{2} (431 sq mi) with a considerable rural area. The City grew by an estimated 1,119 people in the transfer.

The Local Government (Maryborough and Woocoo) Regulation 1993, which took effect on 31 March 1994, effected the City's annexation of about 700 km^{2} (270 sq mi) of the Shire of Woocoo. At this time, Maryborough was re-subdivided into eight divisions each with one councillor, plus an elected mayor.

On 15 March 2008, under the Local Government (Reform Implementation) Act 2007 passed by the Parliament of Queensland on 10 August 2007, Maryborough merged with the City of Hervey Bay, Shire of Woocoo and part of Tiaro to form the Fraser Coast Region.

== Towns and localities ==
The City of Maryborough included the following settlements:

- Maryborough
  - Maryborough West
  - Granville
  - Island Plantation
- Aldershot
- Beaver Rock
- Boonooroo
- Boonooroo Plains
- Duckinwilla
- Eurong (K'gari)
- Ferney
- Glenorchy
- Great Sandy Strait
- Maaroom
- Poona
- Poona National Park
- St Helens
- Teddington
- The Dimonds
- Tinana
- Tuan
- Tuan Forest
- Walkers Point

== Population ==
Coat of arms of the City of Maryborough.

Year	Population
1921	10,629
1933	11,415
1947	14,395
1954	17,952
1961	19,126
1966	19,659
1971	20,587
1976	21,527
1981	21,530
1986	22,430
1991	22,977
1996	24,681
2001	24,465
2006	25,705

== Mayors ==
The 52 men and women who served as mayor of Maryborough between 1861 and 2008 are covered in the book "Public Life: the Mayors of Maryborough" by the current Fraser Coast mayor George Seymour.

Mayors of Maryborough include:

- 1861–1861: Henry Palmer
- 1861: John Eaton
- 1862: James Dowzer
- 1863–1864: Andrew Melville
- 1864: Robert Case
- 1865: Henry Palmer
- 1869–1870: Thomas Milner
- 1883: Charles Thomas Powers
- 1865: Henry Palmer
- 1866: George Nightingale
- 1877: John Thomas Annear
- 1878: Richard Matthews Hyne
- William Pettigrew
- 1880: Nicholas Tooth
- 1890: George Stupart
- 1894: J. Batholomew
- 1895: Fritz Kinne
- 1901: John Norman
- 1903: Andrew Dunn
- 1906: William Dawson
- 1909: Charles Rabaa
- 1914: Andrew Dunn
- 1915 John Blackley
- 1913–1918: Henry James Hyne
- 1924–1930: Charles Adam
- 1930–1933: Henry Bashford
- 1933–1939: William Halliway (Billy) Domaine
- 1939–1950: Robert McDowall
- 1950–1955: Cyril Tanner
- 1955–1956: Herbert Leslie Jones
- 1956–1965: Robert Alexander Hunter
- 1964–1970: Ralph Stafford
- 1970–1988:John Anderson
- (number of years) R. J. Hyne
- 1988–1991: Ronald James Peters
- N. A. Reed
- 1991–2004: Alan Brown
- 2004–2008: Barbara Hovard

== Notable people ==
In addition to the mayors listed above, other notable people associated with the local government include:

- Walter Adams, an alderman of Maryborough and a Member of the Queensland Legislative Assembly
- Brendan Hansen (politician), an alderman and a member of the Federal and Queensland parliaments
- Otto Nothling, alderman and deputy mayor of Maryborough, and previously represented Australia in cricket and rugby union

== See also ==
- Port of Maryborough
