= Tiaro, Queensland =

Tiaro
- Town
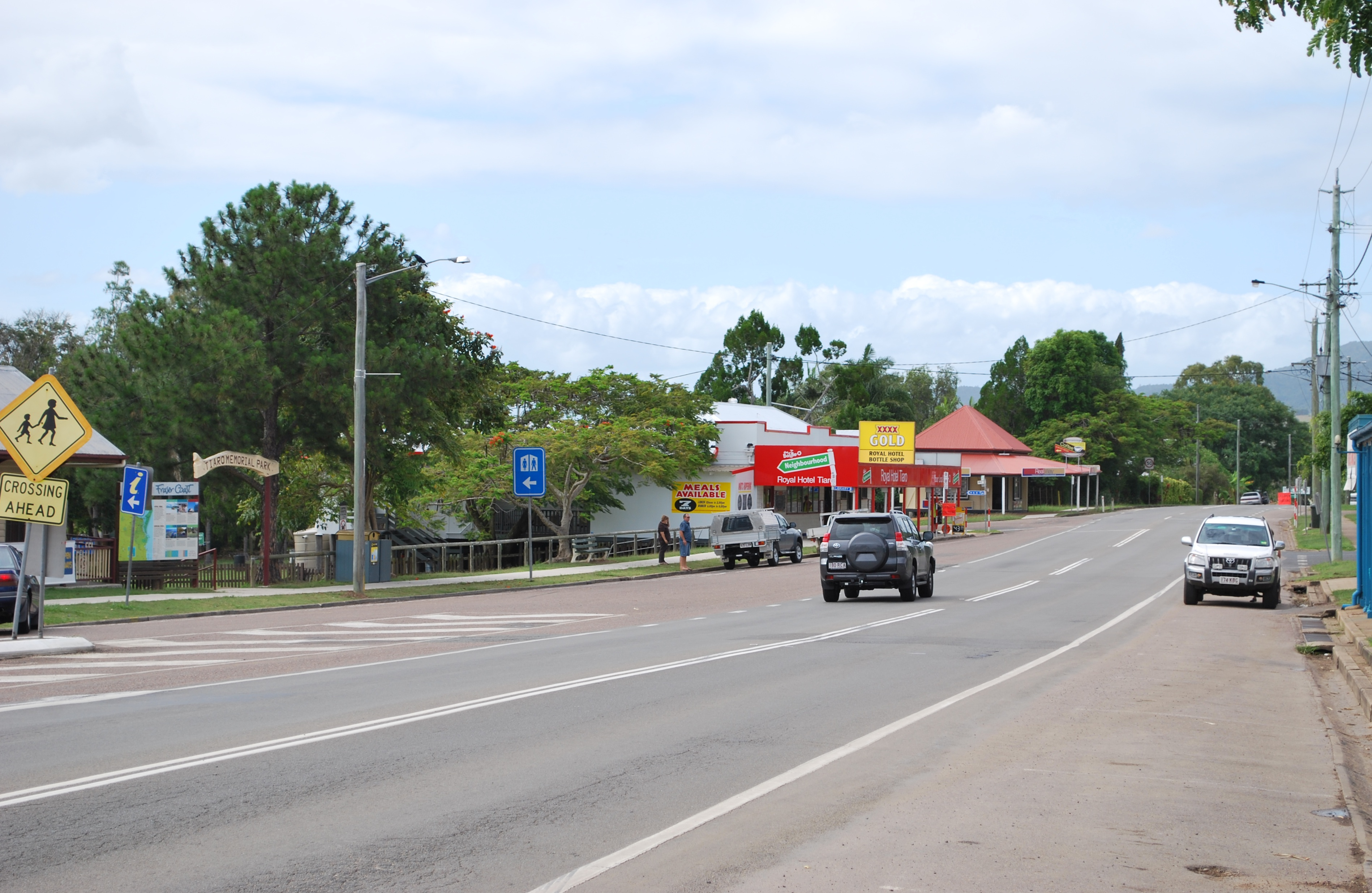
- Bruce Highway at Tiaro

- Interactive map of Tiaro
- Coordinates: 25.7236°S 152.5836°E
- Country: Australia
- State: Queensland
- LGA: Fraser Coast Region
- Location: 26.0 km (16.2 mi) SW of Maryborough; 56.1 km (34.9 mi) SW of Hervey Bay; 227 km (141 mi) N of Brisbane

Government
  - State electorate: Maryborough
  - Federal division: Wide Bay

Area
  - Total: 85.4 km^{2} (33.0 sq mi)

Population
  - Total: 778 (2021 census)
  - Density: 9.110/km^{2} (23.595/sq mi)
- Time zone: UTC+10:00 (AEST)
- Postcode: 4650
Localities around Tiaro
| Pioneers Rest | Owanyilla | Teddington |
| St Mary | Tiaro | Tuan Forest |
| Netherby | Bauple | Talegalla Weir |

Tiaro (/ˈtaɪroʊ/ TY-roh) is a rural town and locality in the Fraser Coast Region, Queensland, Australia. In the 2021 census, the locality of Tiaro had a population of 778 people.

== Geography ==
The town is on the Mary River. It is situated on the Bruce Highway 27 kilometres (17 mi) south of Maryborough and 227 kilometres (141 mi) north of the state capital, Brisbane.

The North Coast railway line enters the locality from the south-west (Netherby), passes through the town which is served by the Tiaro railway station (25.7226°S 152.5819°E), and exits to the north (Owanyilla).

Timber and farming are the predominant industries in the Tiaro area, although the town's position on Queensland's main coastal highway also brings economic benefits.

There are two neighbourhoods within the locality:

- Blackmount in the north of the locality (25.7°S 152.5833°E)
- Kooringa in the south-west of the locality (25.7333°S 152.5666°E).

== History ==
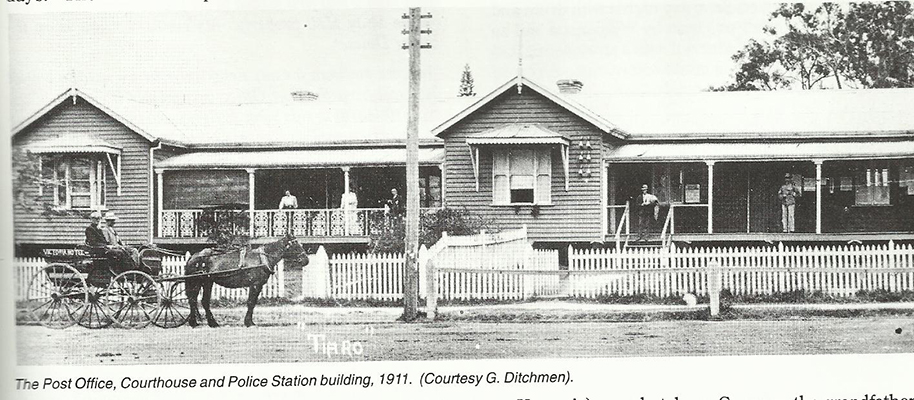
The post office, court house, and police station, Tiaro, 1911

The town takes its name from the pastoral run name in the 1840s. It is believed to be a corruption of the Kabi word (Dauwabra dialect) meaning dead trees.

Tiaro Provisional School opened on 4 October 1870. On 21 January 1878, it became Tiaro State School.

Tiaro had one of the first butter factories in Queensland. Baron Jones built the factory near the railway station in the early 1880s and used horses to churn butter. Cheese factories were built at Tiaro in 1890 and 1894. The Tiaro Butter Factory was closed temporarily on 1 July 1897 due to a short supply of milk. The Maryborough Chronicle reported “On the whole the season has been fairly good, but the supply very short for a district like Tiaro. This, however, was principally owing to the winter last year being so severe, also the year before, when great numbers of milking cows died, and last spring being so dry”. Although the factory opened again, it struggled to make a profit. The factory was later relocated to Murgon in 1913 as most of the cream suppliers came from that district.

Brown Ridge Provisional School opened in 1908. On 1 January 1909, it became Brown Ridge State School. It closed in 1922, but reopened in 1924. It closed permanently in 1925. It was on the western side of Nugent Road (25.7464°S 152.5375°E).

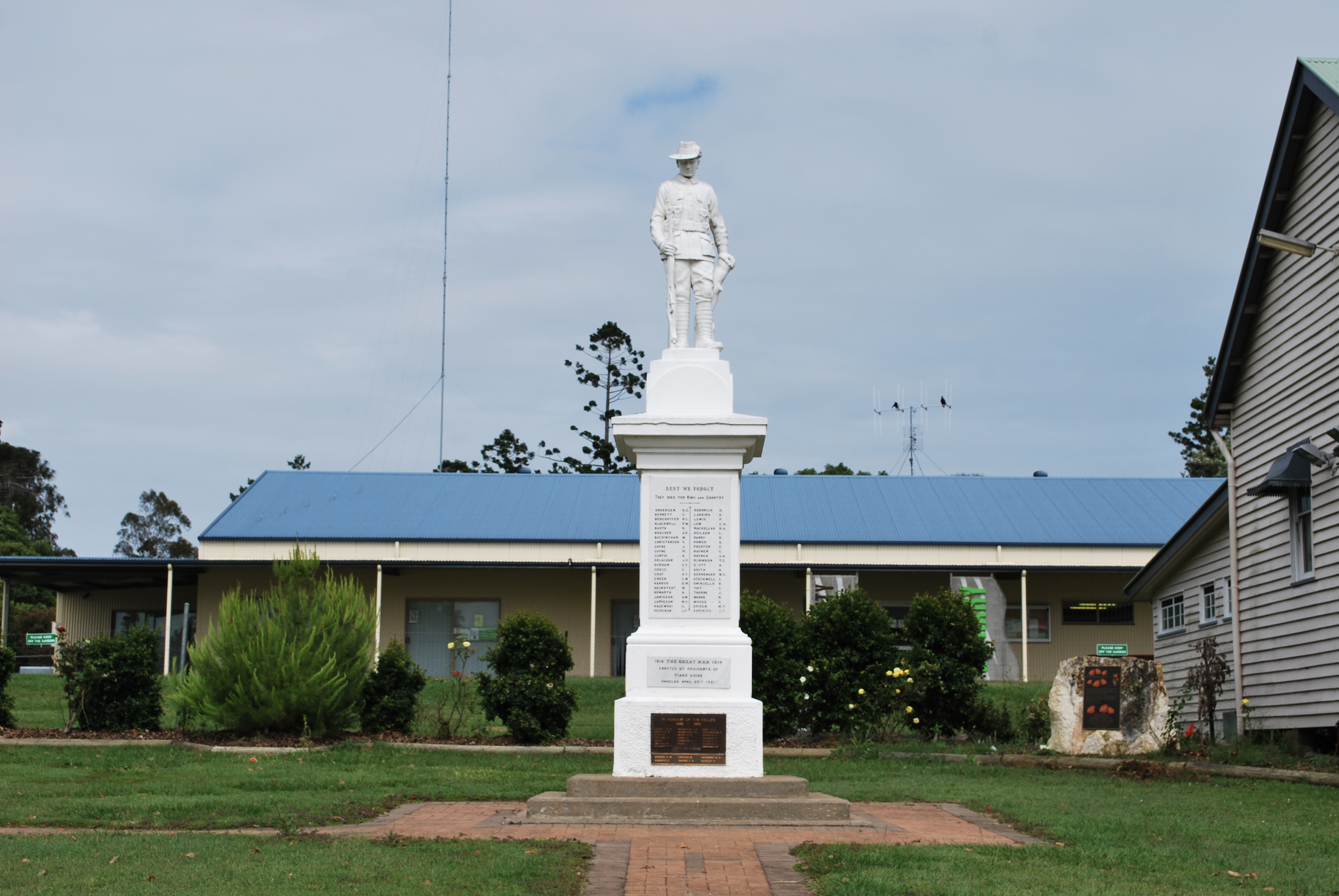
Tiaro War Memorial

The Tiaro War Memorial commemorates those who served in World War I. It was unveiled on 25 April 1921 (ANZAC Day) by Sir Thomas William Glasgow.

The Tiaro library opened in 2006.

Historically within the Shire of Tiaro, on 15 March 2008, under the Local Government (Reform Implementation) Act 2007 passed by the Parliament of Queensland on 10 August 2007, the Shire of Tiaro was dissolved. Division 3 of the Shire, located generally south of Blowers Road, Wards Road and Ularrah Creek and including the towns of Theebine, Curra and Gunalda, became part of the new Gympie Region together with the Shires of Cooloola and Kilkivan. The other two divisions (including Tiaro) amalgamated with Woocoo and the Cities of Hervey Bay and Maryborough to create Fraser Coast Region. In doing so, Tiaro became one of the only three former shires in Queensland not to stay intact, alongside Taroom and Beaudesert.

== Demographics ==
In the 2006 census, Tiaro had a population of 433.

In the 2016 census, the locality of Tiaro had a population of 758 people.

In the 2021 census, the locality of Tiaro had a population of 778 people.

== Education ==
Tiaro State School is a government primary (Prep-6) school for boys and girls at 1 Forgan Terrace (25.7281°S 152.5811°E). In 2017, the school had an enrolment of 31 students with 4 teachers (3 full-time equivalent) and 5 non-teaching staff (3 full-time equivalent). In 2022, the school had an enrolment of 43 students.

There are no secondary schools in Tiaro. The nearest government secondary schools are Maryborough State High School and Aldridge State High School, both in Maryborough to the north-east.

== Amenities ==
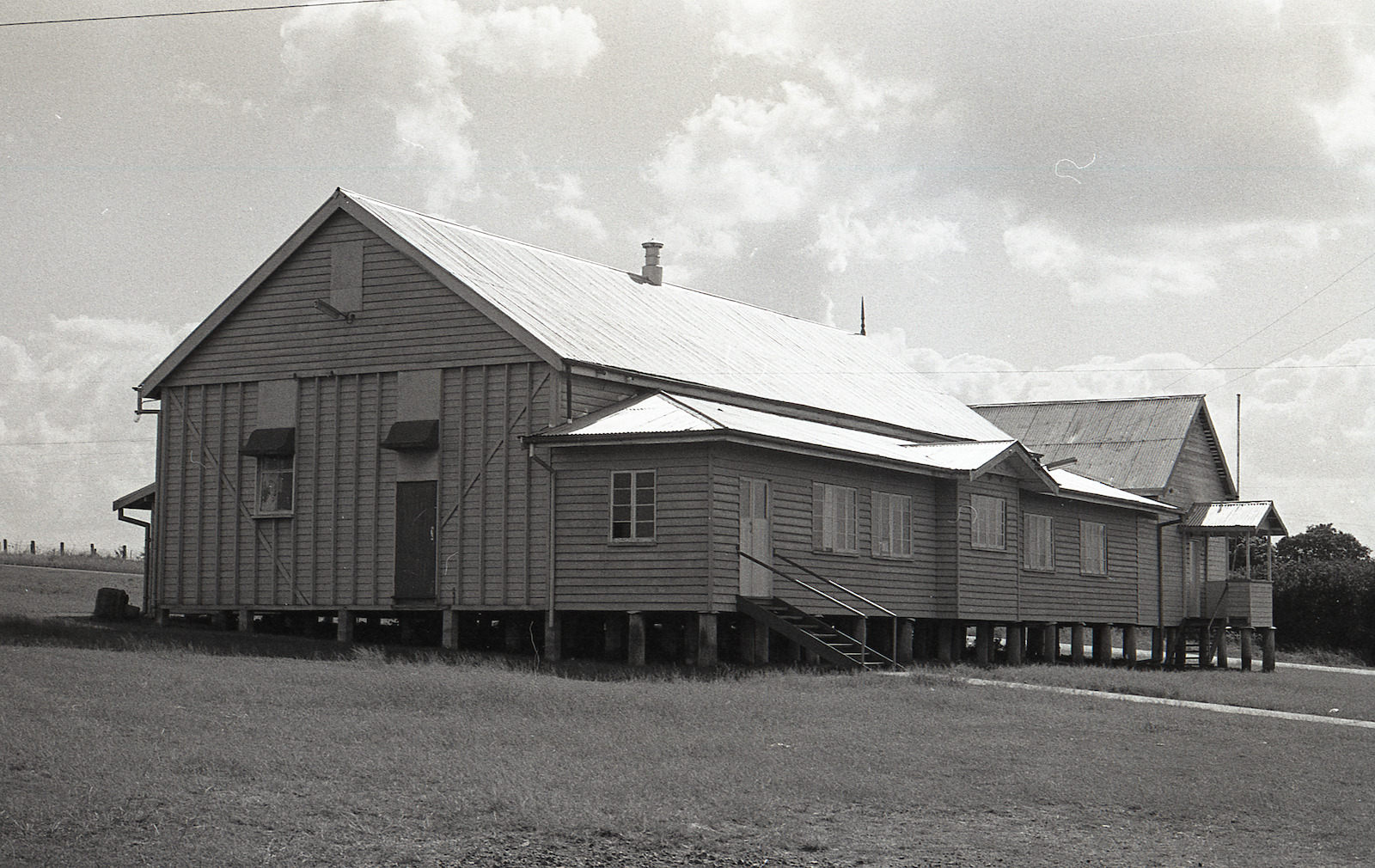
Community Hall, Tiaro Queensland 1975

The Fraser Coast Regional Council operates a public library at Forgan Terrace. Public accessible wifi is provided. Current Library services and collections are provided on the Fraser Coast Regional Libraries website.

The Tiaro Pump Track was opened in October 2022 by Fraser Coast mayor George Seymour and students from the Tiaro State School.

The Tiaro branch of the Queensland Country Women's Association meets at its rooms at 35 Mayne Street.

Petrie Park in Tiaro has features a boat ramp into the Mary River.

== Proposed Bypass ==
The Bruce Highway currently runs through the centre of Tiaro, but there are plans to construct a bypass to the east of the town.

The rationale from the Queensland Government for the bypass includes: “The Tiaro Bypass will improve the flood immunity, safety, and efficiency of the Bruce Highway and future-proof the road to cater for growing traffic volumes. It will also remove a significant number of heavy vehicles from Tiaro township, improving safety and liveability for residents.”

== Notable residents ==
- Thomas William Glasgow was born in Tiaro

== See also ==
- Tiaro railway station
