= Tuan Forest, Queensland =

Tuan Forest
- Suburb
- Interactive map of Tuan Forest
- Coordinates: 25.7152°S 152.8069°E
- Country: Australia
- State: Queensland
- LGA: Fraser Coast Region
- Location: 16.3 km (10.1 mi) SE of Maryborough; 56.2 km (34.9 mi) NNW of Tin Can Bay; 78.2 km (48.6 mi) NNE of Gympie; 256 km (159 mi) N of Brisbane

Government
  - State electorates: Maryborough; Gympie
  - Federal division: Wide Bay

Area
  - Total: 509.3 km^{2} (196.6 sq mi)

Population
  - Total: 0 (2021 census)
  - Density: 0.0000/km^{2} (0.0000/sq mi)
- Time zone: UTC+10:00 (AEST)
- Postcode: 4650
Suburbs around Tuan Forest
Bidwill; Magnolia	Boonooroo Plains	Boonooroo; Tuan
Teddington; Tiaro	Tuan Forest	Poona; Great Sandy Strait; Tinnanbar
Talegalla Weir	Bauple Forest; Neerdie; Toolara Forest	Tin Can Bay

Tuan Forest is a coastal locality split between the Gympie Region and the Fraser Coast Region, both in Queensland, Australia. In the 2021 census, Tuan Forest had "no people or a very low population".

The mostly undeveloped town of Tawan is on the south-east cost of the locality (25.7444°S 152.9322°E) within the Fraser Coast Region.

== Geography ==
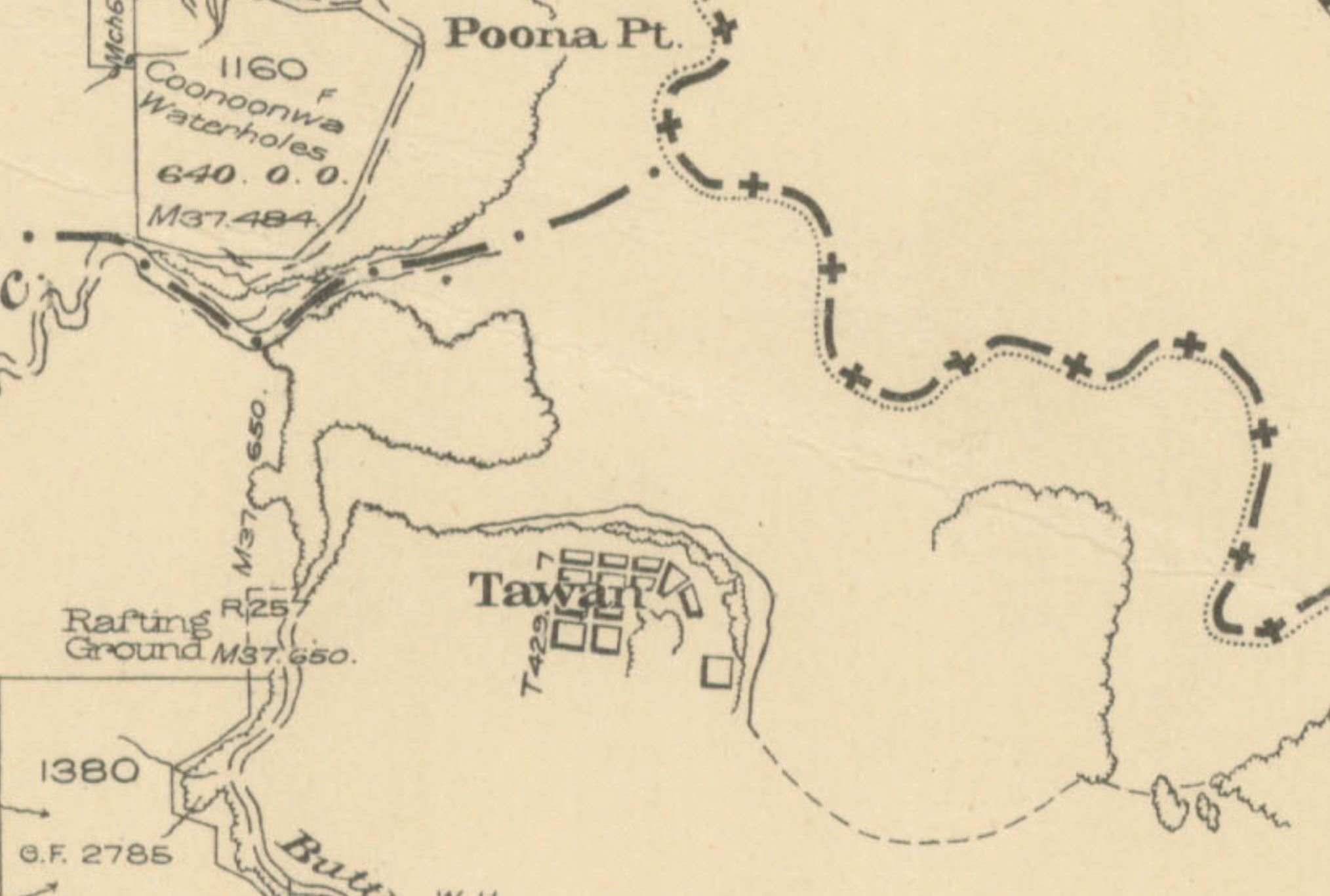
Map of Town of Tawan, 1922

The Great Sandy Strait forms part of the eastern and south-eastern boundaries of the locality.

The Maryborough Cooloola Road enters the locality from the north-west (Boonooroo Plains) and forms the north-eastern boundary of the locality before proceeding south through the locality, exiting to the south-east (Tin Can Bay).

The locality is within the Tuan State Forest. The land use is a mixture of plantation and production forestry, apart from some residences in the town of Tawan.

== Demographics ==
In the 2016 census, Tuan Forest had "no people or a very low population".

In the 2021 census, Tuan Forest had "no people or a very low population".

== Education ==
There are no schools in Tuan Forest. The nearest government primary schools are:

- Tin Can Bay State School in neighbouring Tin Can Bay to the south-east
- Bauple State School in Bauple to the south-west
- Tiaro State School in neighbouring Tiaro to the west
- Granville State School in Granville to the north

The nearest government secondary schools are:

- Tin Can Bay State School (to Year 10)
- Maryborough State High School (to Year 12) in Maryborough to the north
- Gympie State High School (to Year 12) in Gympie to the south

There are also non-government schools in both Maryborough and Gympie and their suburbs.
