= Tiaro railway station =

Former railway station in Queensland, Australia

Tiaro

General information
- Location: Railway Street, Tiaro, Queensland (access off Bruce Highway)
- Coordinates: 25°43′20″S 152°34′54″E
- Line: North Coast Line
- Connections: no connections

History
- Closed: Yes

Services
Preceding station	Queensland Rail	Following station
Gundiah towards Brisbane	North Coast line	Owanyilla towards Cairns
Location

Tiaro railway station is a closed railway station on the North Coast railway line in Queensland, Australia.

== History ==
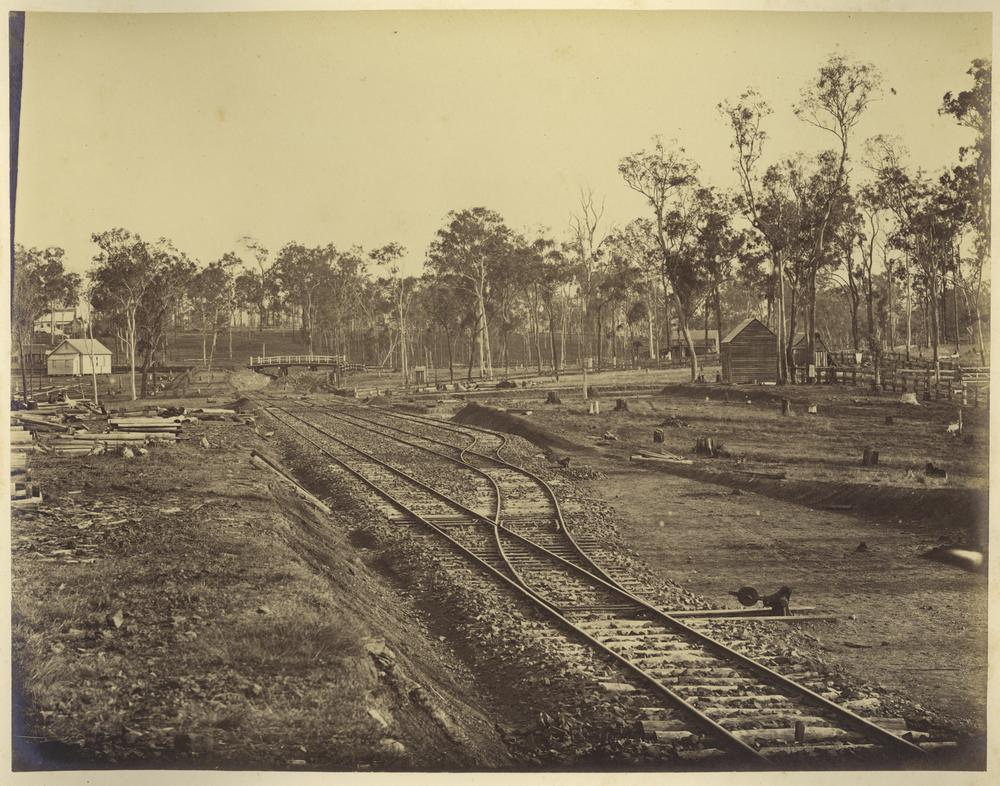
Tiaro's yard during construction, circa. 1887

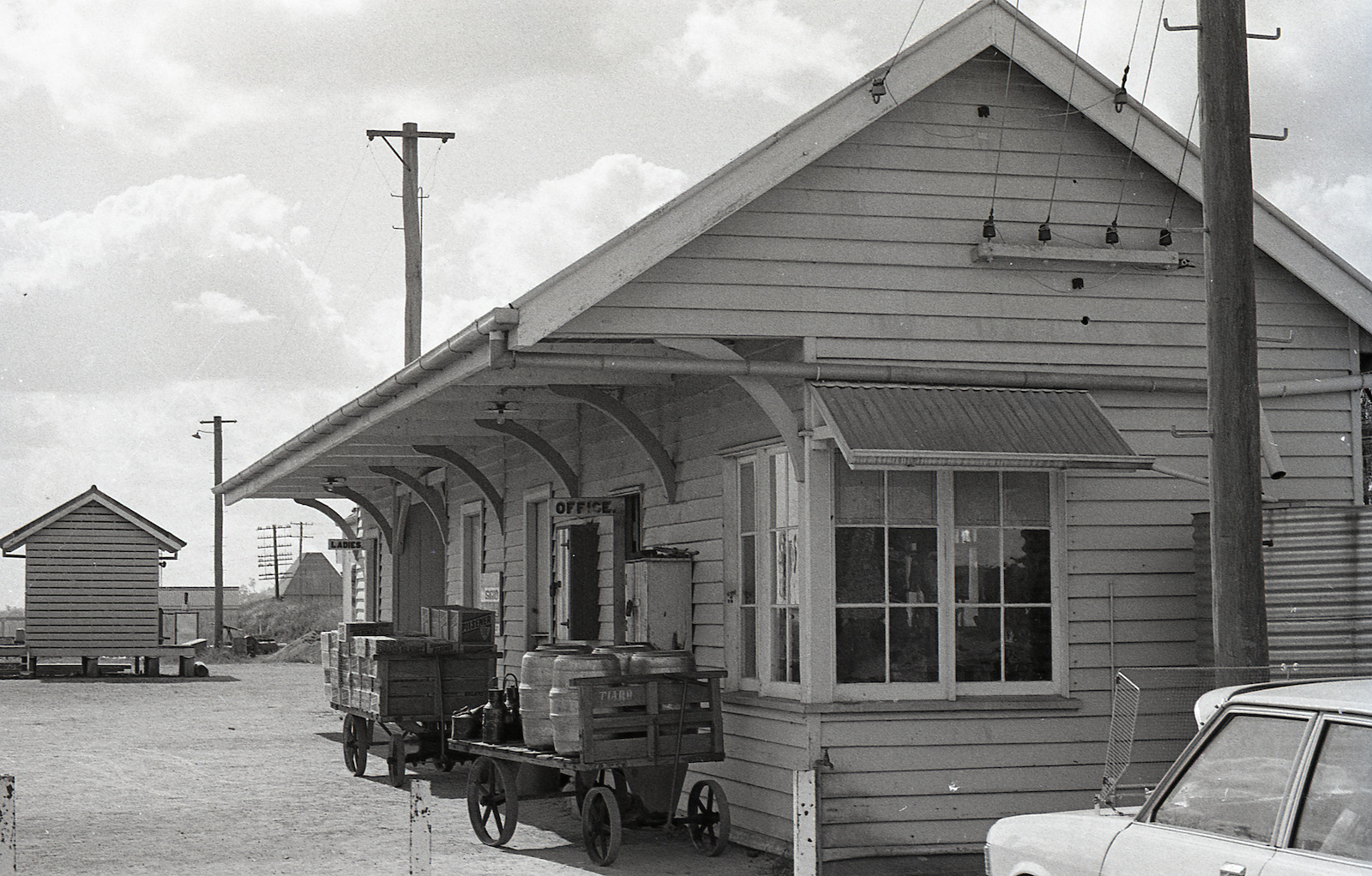
The Tiaro Railway Station in 1975.

The station was built in 1877, two years before the line from Gympie to Maryborough was completed. It consisted of a station building and a platform, and two sidings running parallel to the main North Coast line. After the station closed, the building was moved to Mayne Street and restored as a tourist information centre. Some of the siding platforms still exist, however the station platform has been removed.
