= Fraser Coast Region =

Coordinates: 25°17′28.5″S 152°49′51.3″E

- Local government area
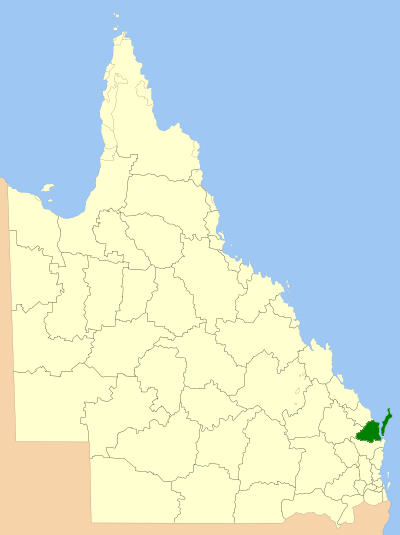
- Location within Queensland

- Interactive map of Fraser Coast Region
- Country: Australia
- State: Queensland
- Region: Wide Bay–Burnett
- Established: 2008
- Council seat: Hervey Bay

Government
  - Mayor: George Seymour
  - State electorates: Maryborough; Hervey Bay
  - Federal divisions: Hinkler; Wide Bay

Area
  - Total: 7,105 km^{2} (2,743 sq mi)

Population
  - Total: 111,032 (2021 census)
  - Density: 15.6273/km^{2} (40.4745/sq mi)
- Website: Fraser Coast Region
LGAs around Fraser Coast Region
Bundaberg	Bundaberg	Coral Sea
North Burnett	Fraser Coast Region	Coral Sea
Gympie	Gympie	Gympie

The Fraser Coast Region is a local government area in the Wide Bay–Burnett region of Queensland, Australia, about 250 kilometres (160 mi) north of Brisbane, the state capital. It is centred on the twin cities of Hervey Bay and Maryborough and also contains K'gari (formerly known as Fraser Island). It was created in 2008 from a merger of the Cities of Maryborough and Hervey Bay and the Shires of Woocoo and most of Tiaro.

The resident population at the 2021 census was 111,032 people and the estimated population in 2023 was 117,940.

The 2024–2025 budget of the Fraser Coast Regional Council is $477 million.

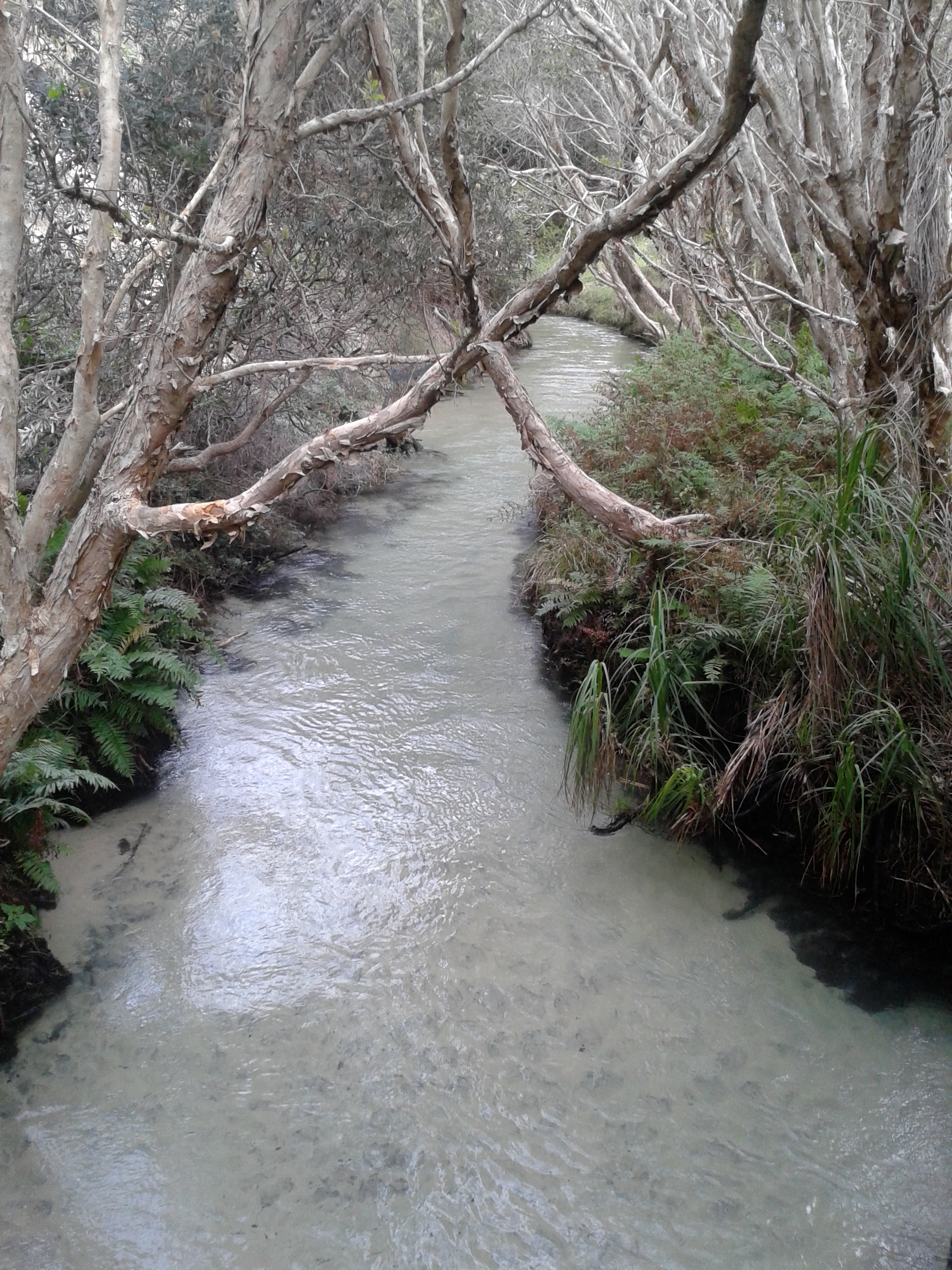
Eli Creek is the largest creek on the eastern beach of Fraser Island

== History ==
Butchulla (also known as Batjala, Badtjala, Badjela and Badjala) is the language of the Fraser Coast region, including K'gari. Butchulla language region includes the landscape within the local government boundaries of the Fraser Coast Regional Council, particularly the towns of Maryborough and Hervey Bay extending south towards Noosa and northwest to Howard.

On 10 March 1861, the Municipal Borough of Maryborough, governed under the Municipalities Act 1858 which had been inherited from New South Wales upon the separation of Queensland in 1859, was proclaimed, becoming the sixth municipal government in Queensland. Henry Palmer was appointed as its first Mayor.

On 11 November 1879, when the Divisional Boards Act 1879 came into effect, the Antigua and Burrum Divisions were created around what is now Hervey Bay. On 15 September 1883, the Granville Division was established to serve the district surrounding Maryborough. Howard Division was separated from the Isis Division in 1900.

With the passage of the Local Authorities Act 1902, all four divisions became Shires on 31 March 1903, and Maryborough became a Town. On 7 January 1905, Maryborough achieved City status, and a Town Hall was built on the corner of Kent and Adelaide Streets and became the administrative centre of the City.

The Shire of Degilbo, later renamed Biggenden, split away from the Shire of Burrum on 3 June 1905. On 23 December 1905, Burrum was renamed Pialba.

On 17 February 1917, the Granville, Antigua and Pialba shires were dissolved, and split between a new Shire of Burrum and the Shire of Woocoo, which had been gazetted three years earlier. By the 1920s the Hervey Bay area was rapidly expanding due to continuing growth in the primary industries such as sugar cane, citrus, pineapples, beef cattle and fishing, as well as investment in transport infrastructure. In the 1950s and 1960s, population and development increased, and the coastal towns slowly merged into a single urban area.

On 20 December 1975, but effective from 27 March 1976 local government elections, the Shire of Burrum was renamed the Shire of Hervey Bay. With the new focus on the coastal region, 1,086.4 km^{2} (419.5 sq mi) of its area, with an estimated population of 1,119, was annexed by the City of Maryborough, while 1,269.0 km^{2} (490.0 sq mi) with an estimated population of 2,629 was annexed by the Shire of Woocoo.

In September 1977, the Shire of Hervey Bay received Town status, and on 18 February 1984 it became a City.

On 15 March 2008, under the Local Government (Reform Implementation) Act 2007 passed by the Parliament of Queensland on 10 August 2007, the City of Hervey Bay merged with the City of Maryborough, Shire of Woocoo and the northern part of Tiaro (Divisions 1 and 2) to form the Fraser Coast Region.

On 13 November 2018 it was announced by the Deputy Prime Minister, Michael McCormack, Federal Member for Hinkler Keith Pitt and Fraser Coast Mayor George Seymour that the Fraser Coast Regional Council would be part of a new regional deal with the Australian Government to build infrastructure.

The council's current Chief Executive Officer, Mica Martin, was appointed in October 2025.

The Kauri Pine (Agathis robusta) was officially designated as the region's arboreal emblem on 25 March 2026.

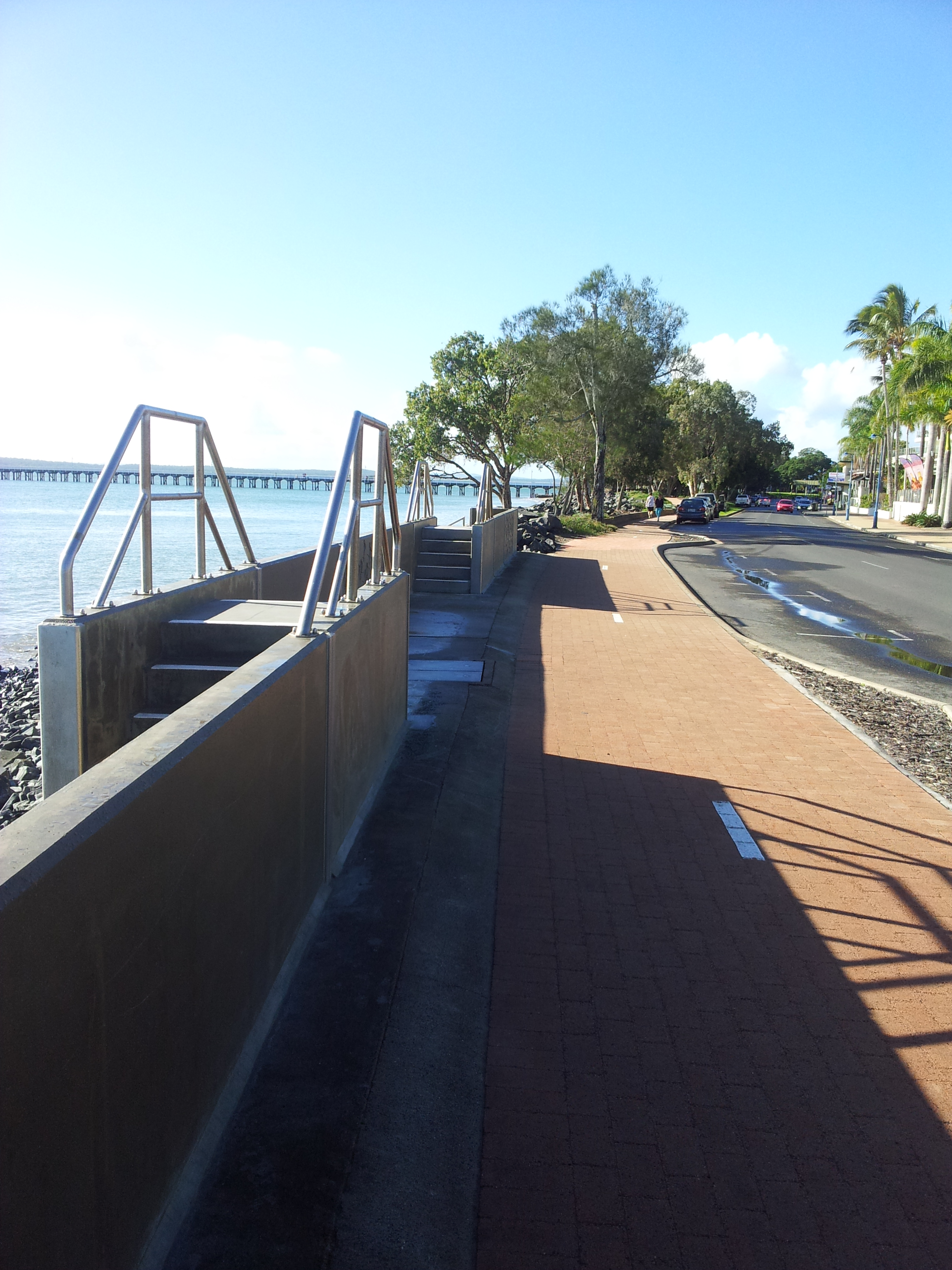
Urangan Seawall, Pier in the background, Urangan

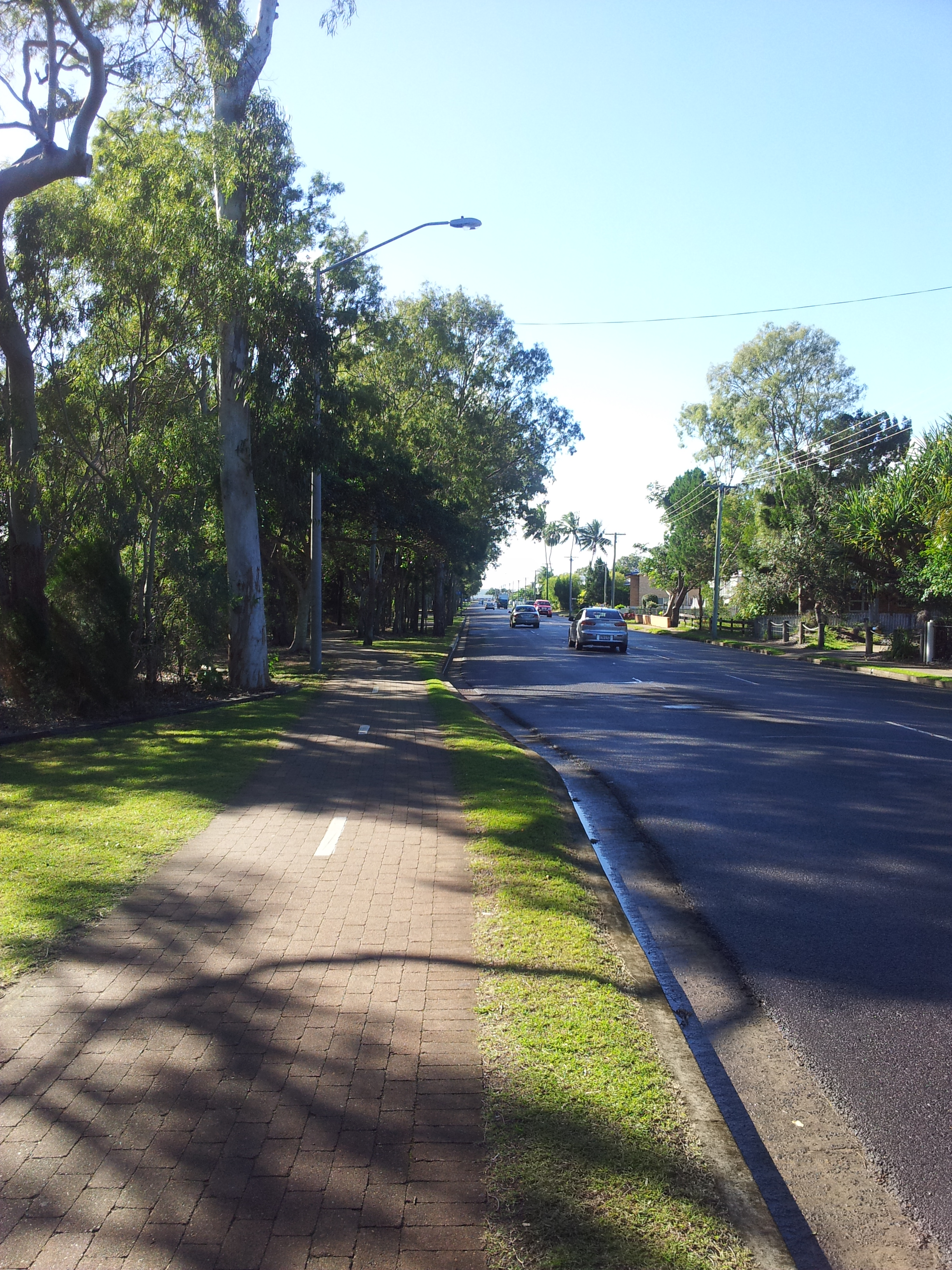
The Esplanade, Urangan

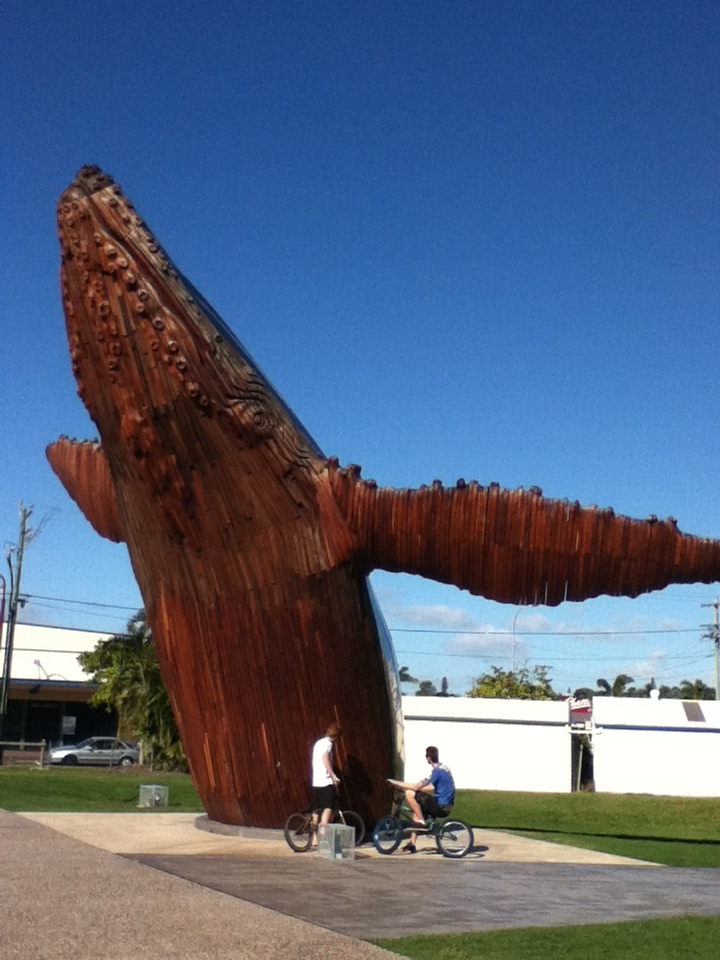
Giant whale sculpture at Hervey Bay

== Divisions ==
The council consists of ten councillors and a mayor, elected for a four-year term. Each of the councillors represent one of the ten divisions. The next election is due in March 2028.

== Towns and localities ==
The Fraser Coast Region includes the following settlements:

Urban Hervey Bay:

- Booral
- Bunya Creek
- Craignish
- Dundowran
- Dundowran Beach
- Eli Waters
- Kawungan
- Nikenbah
- Pialba
- Point Vernon
- Scarness
- Sunshine Acres
- Susan River
- Takura
- Toogoom
- Torquay
- Urangan
- Urraween
- Walligan
- Wondunna

Rural Hervey Bay:

- Beelbi Creek
- Burgowan
- Burrum
- Burrum Heads
- Burrum River
- Burrum Town
- Cherwell
- Dundathu
- Howard
- Pacific Haven
- River Heads
- Torbanlea
- Walliebum

Maryborough area:

- Maryborough
  - Granville
  - Island Plantation
  - Maryborough West
- Aldershot
- Beaver Rock
- Bidwill
- Boonooroo
- Boonooroo Plains
- Duckinwilla
- Eurong (Fraser Island)
- Ferney
- Glenorchy
- Great Sandy Strait
- Maaroom
- Poona
- Poona National Park
- St Helens
- Teddington
- The Dimonds
- Tinana
- Tuan
- Tuan Forest
- Walkers Point

Woocoo area:

- Antigua
- Aramara
- Bidwill
- Boompa
- Brooweena
- Dunmora
- Grahams Creek
- Mungar
- Oakhurst
- Owanyilla
- Tinana South
- Woocoo
- Yengarie
- Yerra

North Tiaro - Division 1 area:

- Tiaro
- Blackmount
- Pioneers Rest
- St Mary
- Thinoomba

North Tiaro - Division 2 area:

- Bauple
- Bauple Forest
- Glenbar
- Glenwood
- Gootchie
- Gundiah
- Kanigan
- Mount Urah
- Munna Creek
- Neerdie
- Netherby
- Paterson
- Talegalla Weir
- Tin Can Bay^{1}
- Tinnanbar

^{1} - split with Gympie Region

== Libraries ==
The Fraser Coast Regional Council operates public libraries at Burrum Heads, Pialba (Hervey Bay), Howard, Maryborough (John Anderson), Maryborough (Toys and Special Needs), and Tiaro (Tom Gee Memorial). A new library is being constructed at Hervey Bay as part of the Hinkler Regional Deal.

== Heritage register ==
The Fraser Coast Regional Council maintains a local heritage register of significant sites in the Region.

== Significant Tree Register ==
The Fraser Coast Regional Council maintains a significant tree register of trees in the region.

== Demographics ==
The populations given relate to the component entities prior to 2008. The 2011 census was the first for the new Region.

Year	Population (Region total)	Population (Maryborough)	Population (Hervey Bay)	Population (Woocoo)	Population (Tiaro)
1933	22,170	11,415	6,835	777	3,143
1947	26,453	14,395	8,642	750	2,666
1954	29,587	17,952	8,408	660	2,567
1961	30,962	19,126	8,991	640	2,205
1966	31,607	19,659	9,271	567	2,110
1971	32,347	19,257	10,737	491	1,862
1976	37,118	21,527	10,304	3,412	1,875
1981	44,454	21,530	16,402	4,456	2,066
1986	48,308	22,430	20,660	2,700	2,518
1991	60,560	22,977	30,867	3,429	3,287
1996	74,210	24,681	42,391	2,902	4,236
2001	77,837	24,465	45,959	2,964	4,449
2006	90,806	25,705	56,427	3,351	5,323
2011	95,312				
2016	101,504				
2021	111,032				

== Current Councillors/Mayor ==
The current mayor of the Fraser Coast Regional Council is George Seymour, who was elected in a by-election held in May 2018 and re-elected in 2020 and 2024. The by-election followed the dismissal of Chris Loft as Mayor on 16 February 2018 by the Minister for Local Government, Stirling Hinchliffe who alleged Mr Loft made "serial breaches of the Local Government principles outlined in the Local Government Act."

The deputy mayor is elected from the ten councillors.

As at 2025, the councillors are:

- Division 1 - Cr Michelle Byrne
- Division 2 - Cr Phil Truscott
- Division 3 - Cr Paul Truscott
- Division 4 - Cr Daniel Sanderson
- Division 5 - Cr Michelle Govers
- Division 6 - Cr Lachlan Cosgrove
- Division 7 - Cr John Weiland
- Division 8 - Cr Denis Chapman
- Division 9 - Cr Sara Faraj (Deputy Mayor)
- Division 10 - Cr Zane O'Keefe

== List of mayors ==
The first mayor, Mick Kruger, had served on the Hervey Bay City Council prior to the amalgamation in 2008 and the second mayor, Gerard O'Connell, had served on the Maryborough City Council prior to the amalgamation. The current mayor, George Seymour, is the only incumbent mayor to be re-elected on the Fraser Coast Regional Council.

- 2008–2012: Mick Kruger
- 2012–2016: Gerard Daniel O'Connell
- 2016–2018: Chris Loft
- 2018–present: George Seymour

== See also ==
- Great Sandy Biosphere Reserve
