= Shire of Tinana =

Local government area of Queensland, Australia

Coordinates: 25.737°S 152.604°E

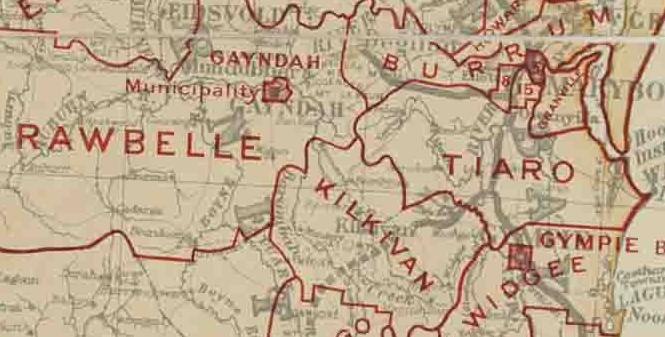
Map of Tinana Division and adjacent local government areas, March 1902. Legend: Maryborough Municipality (3), Antigua Division (8), Tinana Division (15)

The Shire of Tinana is a former local government area in the Wide Bay–Burnett area of Queensland, Australia. It is centred on Tinana, on the southern bank of the Mary River, with the Borough of Maryborough on the northern bank. It existed from 1880 to 1917.

== History ==
On 11 November 1879, the Tinana Division was created as one of 74 divisions within Queensland under the Divisional Boards Act 1879 with a population of 2029.

On 14 September 1883, part of Tinana Division was separated to create the new Granville Division. On 8 November 1883, there was an adjustment of the boundaries between them.

With the passage of the Local Authorities Act 1902, the Tinana Division became the Shire of Tinana on 31 March 1903.

The Shire of Tinana was abolished on 17 Feb 1917 and its area was incorporated into the Shire of Tiaro.

== Chairmen ==
- 1893: John Parke of "Springrove Farm"
- 1894: Thomas Raverty
- 1895–1898: John Parke (again)
- 1899-1900: Thomas Raverty (again)
- 1916–1917: James Cran
