= Glenwood, Queensland =

Glenwood
- Town
- Interactive map of Glenwood
- Coordinates: 25.9305°S 152.6352°E
- Country: Australia
- State: Queensland
- LGAs: Fraser Coast Region; Gympie Region
- Location: 38.6 km (24.0 mi) N of Gympie; 205 km (127 mi) N of Brisbane

Government
  - State electorate: Gympie
  - Federal division: Wide Bay

Area
  - Total: 51.4 km^{2} (19.8 sq mi)

Population
  - Total: 2,137 (2021 census)
  - Density: 41.58/km^{2} (107.68/sq mi)
- Time zone: UTC+10:00 (AEST)
- Postcode: 4570
Localities around Glenwood
| Gootchie | Bauple Forest | Bauple Forest |
| Kanigan | Glenwood | Neerdie |
| Kanigan | Gunalda | Anderleigh |

Glenwood is a locality split between the Fraser Coast Region and the Gympie Region in Queensland, Australia. In the 2021 census, the locality of Glenwood had a population of 2,137 people.

== Geography ==
Glenwood is located about halfway between Gympie and Maryborough on the Bruce Highway.

== History ==
Glenwood Provisional School opened on 11 November 1918. On 1 December 1927 it became Glenwood State School.

Glenwood was part of the Shire of Tiaro until the local government amalgamations of 2008.

The Glenwood Community Space Masterplan was endorsed by the Fraser Coast Regional Council on 24 January 2024. The first stage of this master plan for public spaces in Glenwood was completed with the official opening of the playground facilities by Fraser Coast mayor George Seymour on 9 August 2025.

== Demographics ==
In the 2011 census, the locality of Glenwood had a population of 1,259 people.

In the 2016 census, the locality of Glenwood had a population of 1,535 people.

In the 2021 census, the locality of Glenwood had a population of 2,137 people.

== Education ==
Glenwood State School is a government primary (Prep-6) school for boys and girls at 13 Glenwood School Road (25.9496°S 152.6026°E). In 2017, the school had an enrolment of 83 students with 8 teachers (5 full-time equivalent) and 8 non-teaching staff (5 full-time equivalent).

There is no secondary school in Glenwood; the nearest government secondary schools are Tin Can Bay State School (to Year 10) in Tin Can Bay to the east and the two state high schools in Gympie: Gympie State High School and James Nash State High School.

== Events ==
Glenwood is a small town except on the third weekend in August when they hold their Swap Meet which is held at the Glenwood Hall. The Glenwood Community Centre run many events throughout the year at the Glenwood Hall.
