= Owanyilla railway station =

Former railway station in Queensland, Australia

Owanyilla

General information
- Location: Heath Road, Owanyilla, Queensland
- Coordinates: 25°40′05″S 152°36′18″E
- Line: North Coast Line
- Connections: no connections

History
- Closed: Yes

Services
Preceding station	Queensland Rail	Following station
Tiaro towards Brisbane	North Coast line	Mungar towards Cairns
Location

Owanyilla railway station is a closed railway station on the North Coast railway line in Queensland. It was built to service the pine chip factory directly across the road. Nothing is left of the railway station.

== Pine Chip Factory ==
Woodchip trains to Gladstone originate at a balloon loop at the Canterwood Pine Chip facility just east of the station site, and joins the North Coast Line just north of the station site. The factory was built in 1994, as was the railway station. However, it became clear early on that there was very little patronage to the pine chip factory so the station was shut down and dismantled.
