= Great Sandy Biosphere Reserve =

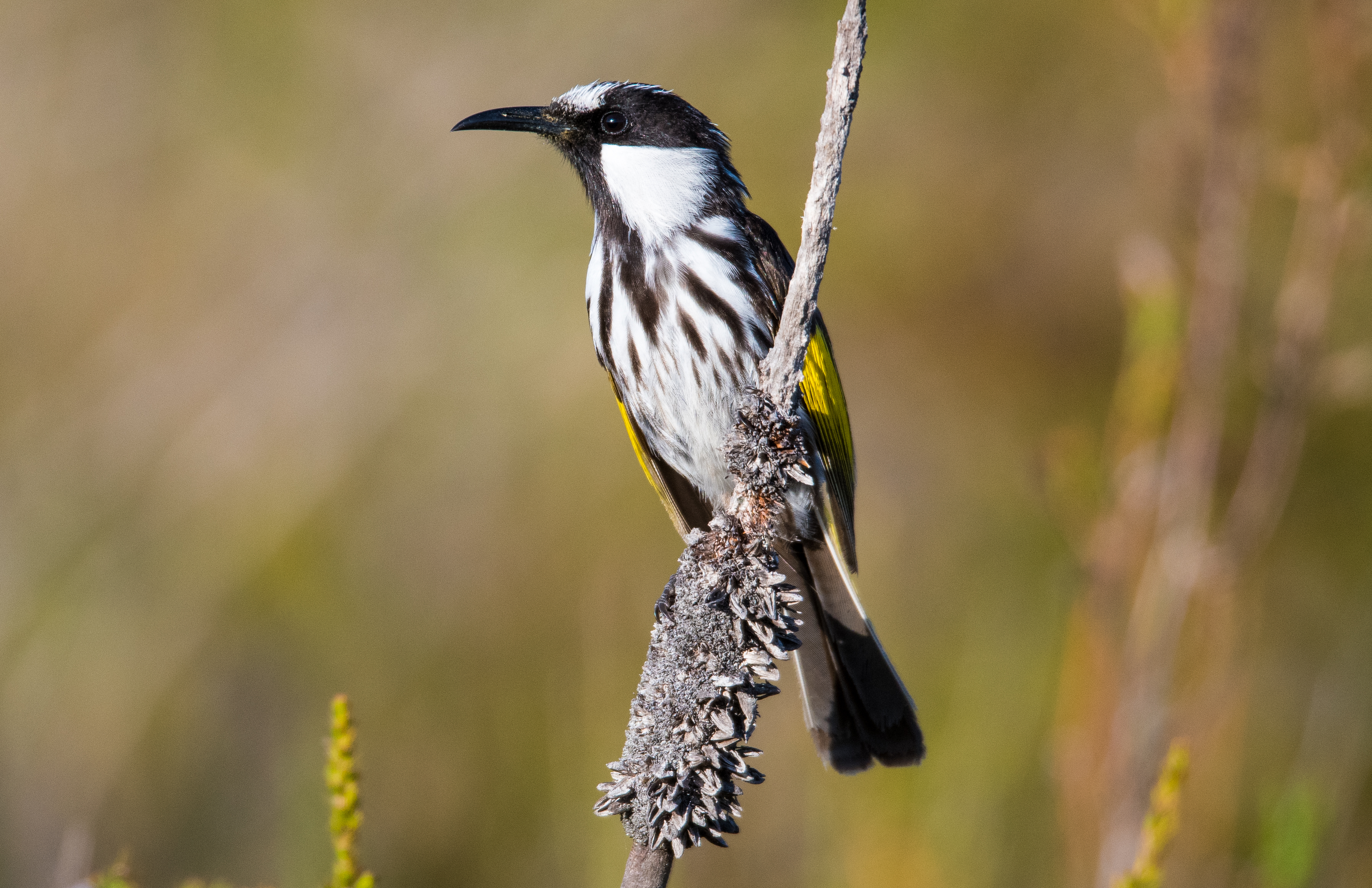
- White-cheeked Honeyeater in the reserve

- Location within Queensland
- Location: Queensland
- Nearest city: Hervey Bay
- Coordinates: 25°22′58.656″S 152°49′39.828″E
- Area: 12,422.16 km^{2} (4,796.22 sq mi)
- Established: 1977
- Visitors: 950,000 (annual estimate) (in 2016)
- Website: Official website

Great Sandy Biosphere Reserve is a biosphere reserve in the Australian state of Queensland located on land and coastal waters associated both with the local government areas of the Fraser Coast Region and the Gympie Region and Fraser Island (also known as K'Gari and Gari), and with the bay known as Hervey Bay.

The biosphere reserve was described by UNESCO in 2016 as:

The Great Sandy Biosphere Reserve is located in the Southeast Queensland Bioregion in eastern Australia. Renowned for its cultural and ecological significance, the reserve contains the Great Sandy Strait, a Ramsar-listed wetland, and Fraser Island, a UNESCO World Heritage site. The reserve incorporates the largest Sand Island and coastal sand mass in the world.

The biosphere reserve was established in 2009 and its managing authorities are reported as being the Burnett Mary Regional Group for Natural Resource Management Ltd., the Environmental Protection Agency (Queensland), the Queensland Parks and Wildlife Service and the local government areas of the Fraser Coast Region and the Gympie Region.

The reserve is a volcanic area and the highest peak in its vicinity is Mount Mothar (450 metres above sea level). There are 6 rivers flowing through the reserve and it is known for being home to the world's tallest and richest rainforest growing on sand.

== See also ==
- List of biosphere reserves in Australia
