= Tuan, Queensland =

Tuan
- Town
- Interactive map of Tuan
- Coordinates: 25.6797°S 152.8766°E
- Country: Australia
- State: Queensland
- LGA: Fraser Coast Region
- Location: 25.2 km (15.7 mi) SW of Maryborough; 56.2 km (34.9 mi) SSE of Hervey Bay; 77.4 km (48.1 mi) NNE of Gympie; 245 km (152 mi) N of Brisbane

Government
  - State electorate: Maryborough
  - Federal division: Wide Bay

Area
  - Total: 2.2 km^{2} (0.85 sq mi)

Population
  - Total: 140 (2021 census)
  - Density: 64/km^{2} (165/sq mi)
- Time zone: AEST
- Postcode: 4650
Localities around Tuan
Tuan Forest	Boonooroo	Boonooroo
Tuan Forest	Tuan	Great Sandy Strait
Tuan Forest	Tuan Forest	Tuan Forest

Tuan is a coastal rural town and locality in the Fraser Coast Region, Queensland, Australia. In the 2021 census, the locality of Tuan had a population of 140 people.

== Geography ==
Big Tuan Creek forms the southern boundary of the locality while Little Tuan Creek bounds the locality to the north. The Great Sandy Strait bounds the locality to the east. The town is situated on the eastern shore.

== History ==
The town name takes its name for an Aboriginal word from a Sydney dialect meaning brush tailed phascogale.

== Demographics ==
In the 2016 census, the locality of Tuan had a population of 153 people.

In the 2021 census, the locality of Tuan had a population of 140 people.

== Education ==
There are no schools in Tuan. The nearest government primary school is Granville State School in Granville to the north-west. The nearest government secondary school is Maryborough State High School in Maryborough, also to the north-west.

== Amenities ==
There are two boat ramps with a floating walkway between them in Bottlebrush Drive on the north bank of Big Tuan Creek (25.68569°S 152.87789°E). They are managed by the Fraser Coast Regional Council.

The Tuan foreshore park is on the junction of Turton Street and the Esplanade (25.68200°S 152.87833°E). It offers picnic and playground facilities.
