= Poona, Queensland =

Poona
- Town
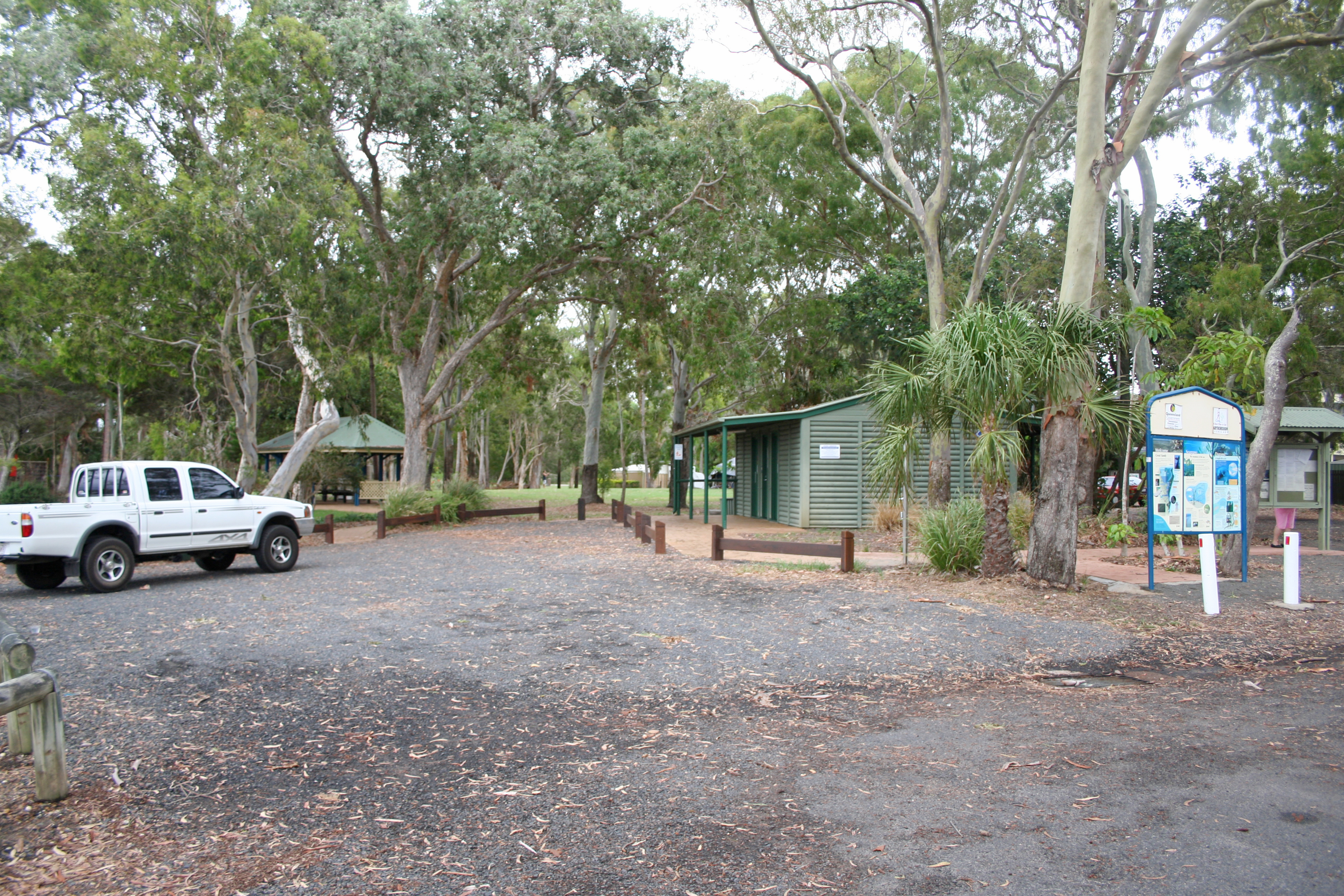
- Boat ramp area, Poona, 2009

- Interactive map of Poona
- Coordinates: 25.7181°S 152.9157°E
- Country: Australia
- State: Queensland
- LGA: Fraser Coast Region
- Location: 35.6 km (22.1 mi) SE of Maryborough; 66.5 km (41.3 mi) SSE of Hervey Bay; 77.2 km (48.0 mi) NNE of Gympie; 248 km (154 mi) N of Brisbane

Government
  - State electorate: Maryborough
  - Federal division: Wide Bay

Area
  - Total: 3.7 km^{2} (1.4 sq mi)

Population
  - Total: 576 (2021 census)
  - Density: 155.7/km^{2} (403/sq mi)
- Time zone: UTC+10:00 (AEST)
- Postcode: 4650
Localities around Poona
Tuan Forest	Tuan Forest	Great Sandy Strait
Tuan Forest	Poona	Great Sandy Strait
Tuan Forest	Great Sandy Strait	Great Sandy Strait

Poona is a coastal town and locality in the Fraser Coast Region, Queensland, Australia. In the 2021 census, the locality of Poona had a population of 576 people.

== Geography ==
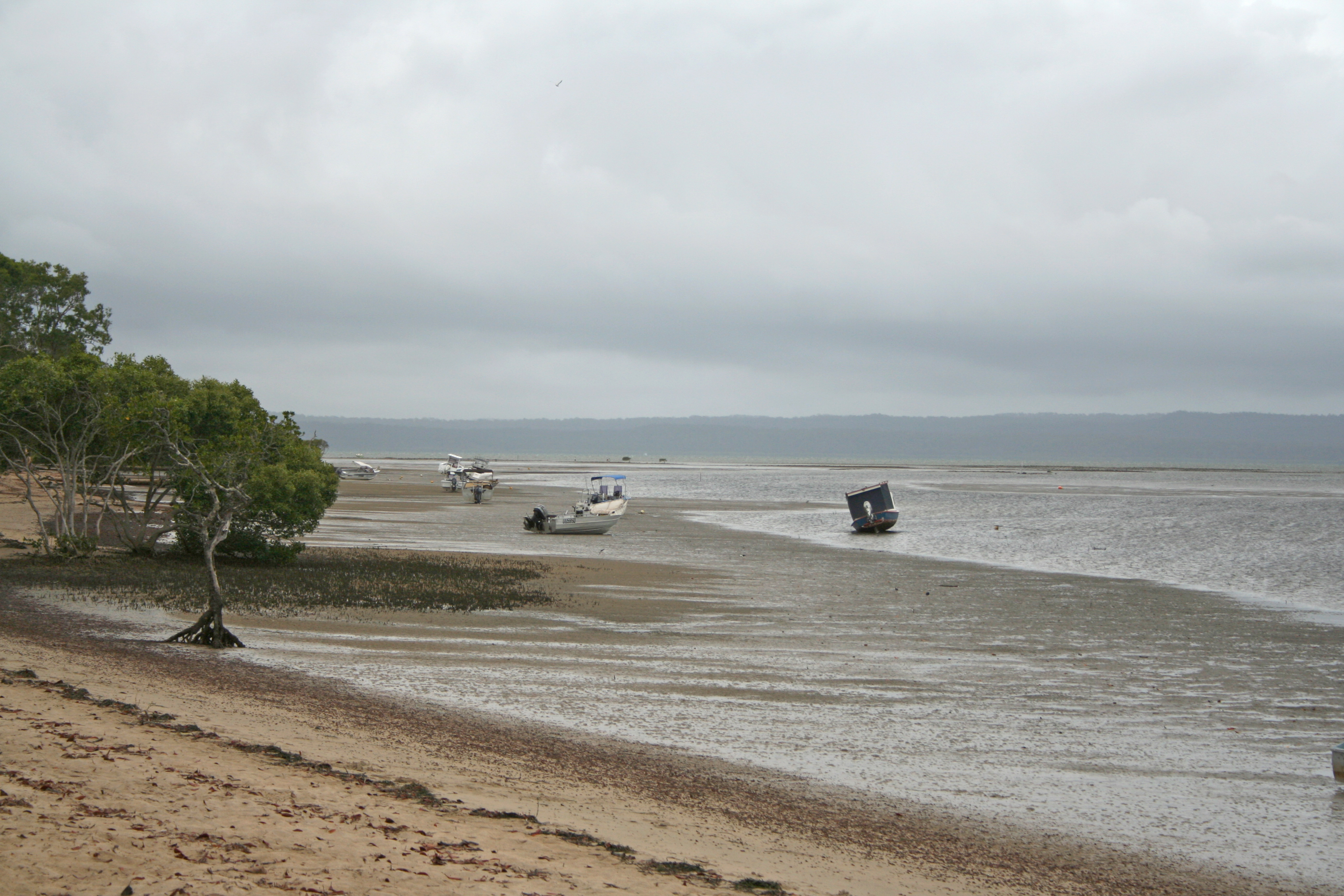
Poona looking out to the Great Sandy Strait, 2015

The locality is bounded to the north and east by the Great Sandy Strait and to the south by Poona Creek which flows into the strait (25.7259°S 152.9118°E). Poona Point is a headland on the north-eastern corner of the locality (25.7102°S 152.9222°E).

The land use is residential housing and services along the east coast and creek frontage at the south. Apart from this, the land use is nature conservation.

== History ==
The name Poona is believed to be Aboriginal in origin, but its meaning is uncertain. The town's name is derived from Poona Creek and Poona Point, both of which appear on a 1878 map.

== Demographics ==
In the 2016 census, the locality of Poona had a population of 481 people.

In the 2021 census, the locality of Poona had a population of 576 people.

== Education ==
There are no schools in Poona. The nearest government primary school is Granville State School in Granville, Maryborough, to the north-west. The nearest government secondary school is Maryborough State High School in Maryborough to the north-west.

== Amenities ==
Poona Community Hall is at 7 Snapper Drive (25.72055°S 152.91140°E). It is operated by the Poona Community Progress Association. In addition to the hall, there is a tennis court, putting green, basketball court, community garden and playground. There is a program of activities including exercise, dancing, craft, and social gatherings.

The Poona ANZAC Memorial was officially dedicated and consecrated on 28 October 2011.

There is a boat ramp off Owen Cox Street into the Great Sandy Strait (25.7225°S 152.9135°E). It is managed by the Fraser Coast Regional Council.

== Facilities ==
Sandy Straits Rural Fire Brigade is based at 8 Snapper Drive (25.7207°S 152.9112°E).
