= Tinnanbar, Queensland =

Tinnanbar
- Town
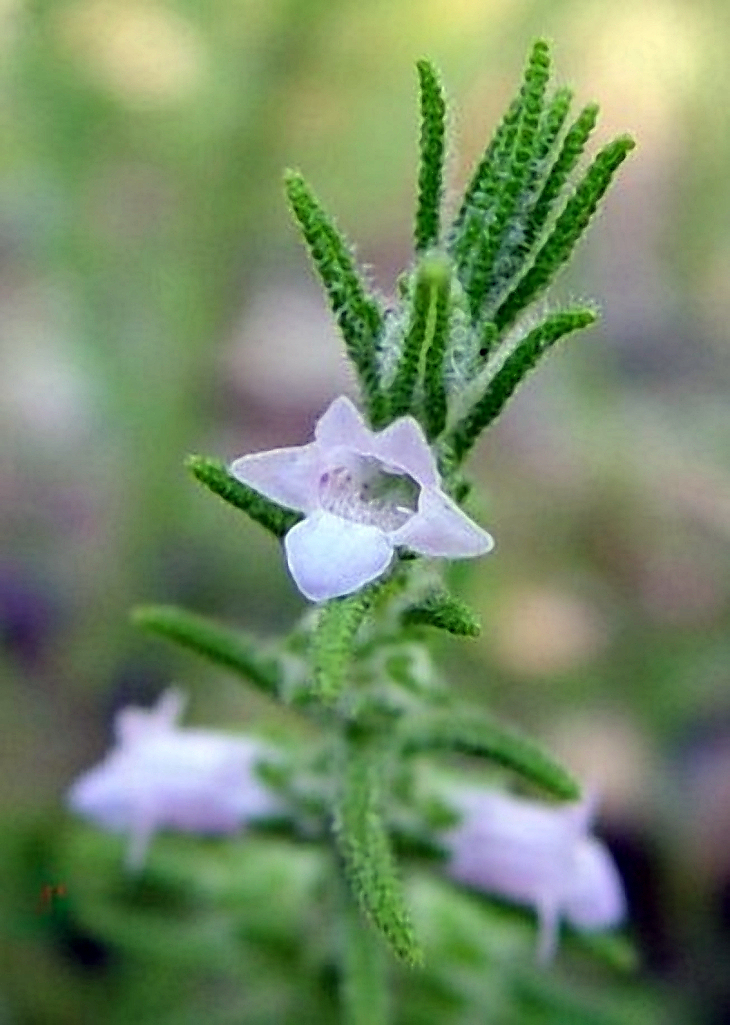
- Chloanthes parviflora, Tinnanbar, 2004

- Interactive map of Tinnanbar
- Coordinates: 25.7586°S 152.9577°E
- Country: Australia
- State: Queensland
- LGA: Fraser Coast Region
- Location: 46.9 km (29.1 mi) N of Tin Can Bay; 52.5 km (32.6 mi) SE of Maryborough; 75.3 km (46.8 mi) NE of Gympie; 83.4 km (51.8 mi) SSE of Hervey Bay; 246 km (153 mi) N of Brisbane

Government
  - State electorate: Maryborough
  - Federal division: Wide Bay

Area
  - Total: 15.9 km^{2} (6.1 sq mi)

Population
  - Total: 64 (2021 census locality)
  - Density: 4.03/km^{2} (10.43/sq mi)
- Time zone: UTC+10:00 (AEST)
- Postcode: 4650
Localities around Tinnanbar
| Tuan Forest | Great Sandy Strait | Great Sandy Strait |
| Tuan Forest | Tinnanbar | Great Sandy Strait |
| Tuan Forest | Tin Can Bay | Tin Can Bay |

Tinnanbar is a coastal town and a locality in the Fraser Coast Region, Queensland, Australia. In the 2021 census, the locality of Tinnanbar had a population of 64 people.

== Geography ==
Tinnanbar is bounded by the Great Sandy Strait on the north and east and by Kauri Creek to the south. The town is located on the north coast, while the east coastal strip is protected as the Great Sandy Conservation Park. The marine areas and tidal flats of the conservation park has populations of dolphins, turtles and dugongs. It is an important roosting area for migratory wading birds and a nesting area for the false water rat.

The Great Sandy Marine Park is off-shore along much of the coastline at Tinnanbar.

The only access road to the town is Tinninbar Road, which connects to the Maryborough-Cooloola Road.

== Demographics ==
In the 2016 census, the locality of Tinnanbar had a population of 123 people.

In the 2021 census, the locality of Tinnanbar had a population of 64 people.

== Education ==
There are no schools in Tinnanbar. The nearest government primary school is Tin Can Bay State School in Tin Can Bay to the south. The nearest government secondary schools are Tin Can Bay State School (to Year 10) and Maryborough State High School (to Year 12) in Maryborough to the north-west.

== Amenities ==
The town has a white sandy beach at both high and low tide. Fishing and sailing are popular activities. There is a 2-lane boat ramp at the end of Boat Ramp Drive.

The Great Sandy Marine Park along the Tinnanbar coast is a "go-slow" area for boats to avoid injury to turtles and dugongs and protect the natural environment. In a "no-slow" area speeds may not exceed 6 knots (11 km/h; 6.9 mph) and motorised sports activities are prohibited. However, there is a transit channel from the Tinnanbar boat ramp to beyond the marine park where the go-slow rules do not apply.
