= Bauple Forest, Queensland =

Bauple Forest
- Suburb
- Interactive map of Bauple Forest
- Coordinates: 25.8830°S 152.6880°E
- Country: Australia
- State: Queensland
- LGA: Fraser Coast Region
- Location: 27.6 km (17.1 mi) WNW of Tin Can Bay; 54.1 km (33.6 mi) S of Maryborough; 58.3 km (36.2 mi) N of Gympie; 87.2 km (54.2 mi) N of Hervey Bay; 248 km (154 mi) N of Brisbane

Government
  - State electorates: Gympie; Maryborough
  - Federal division: Wide Bay

Area
  - Total: 102.8 km^{2} (39.7 sq mi)

Population
  - Total: 0 (2021 census)
  - Density: 0.000/km^{2} (0.000/sq mi)
- Time zone: UTC+10:00 (AEST)
- Postcode: 4650
Suburbs around Bauple Forest
Bauple	Talegalla Weir	Tuan Forest
Gootchie	Bauple Forest	Neerdie
Glenwood	Glenwood	Neerdie

Bauple Forest is a rural locality in the Fraser Coast Region, Queensland, Australia. In the 2021 census, Bauple Forest had "no people or a very low population".

== Geography ==
Most of the locality is within the Bauple State Forest except for a small area in the west of the locality.

== History ==
The locality was named and bounded on 13 March 1998. The origin of the name is not reported but presumably refers to the Bauple State Forest.

== Demographics ==
In the 2016 census, Bauple Forest had a population of 7 people.

In the 2021 census, Bauple Forest had "no people or a very low population".

== Education ==
There are no schools in Bauple Forest. The nearest government primary school is Bauple State School in Bauple to the north-west. The nearest government secondary schools are Tin Can Bay State School (to Year 10) in Tin Can Bay to the east, Maryborough State High School (to Year 12) in Maryborough to the north and Gympie State High School (to Year 12) in Gympie to the south.
