= Bauple, Queensland =

Bauple
- Town
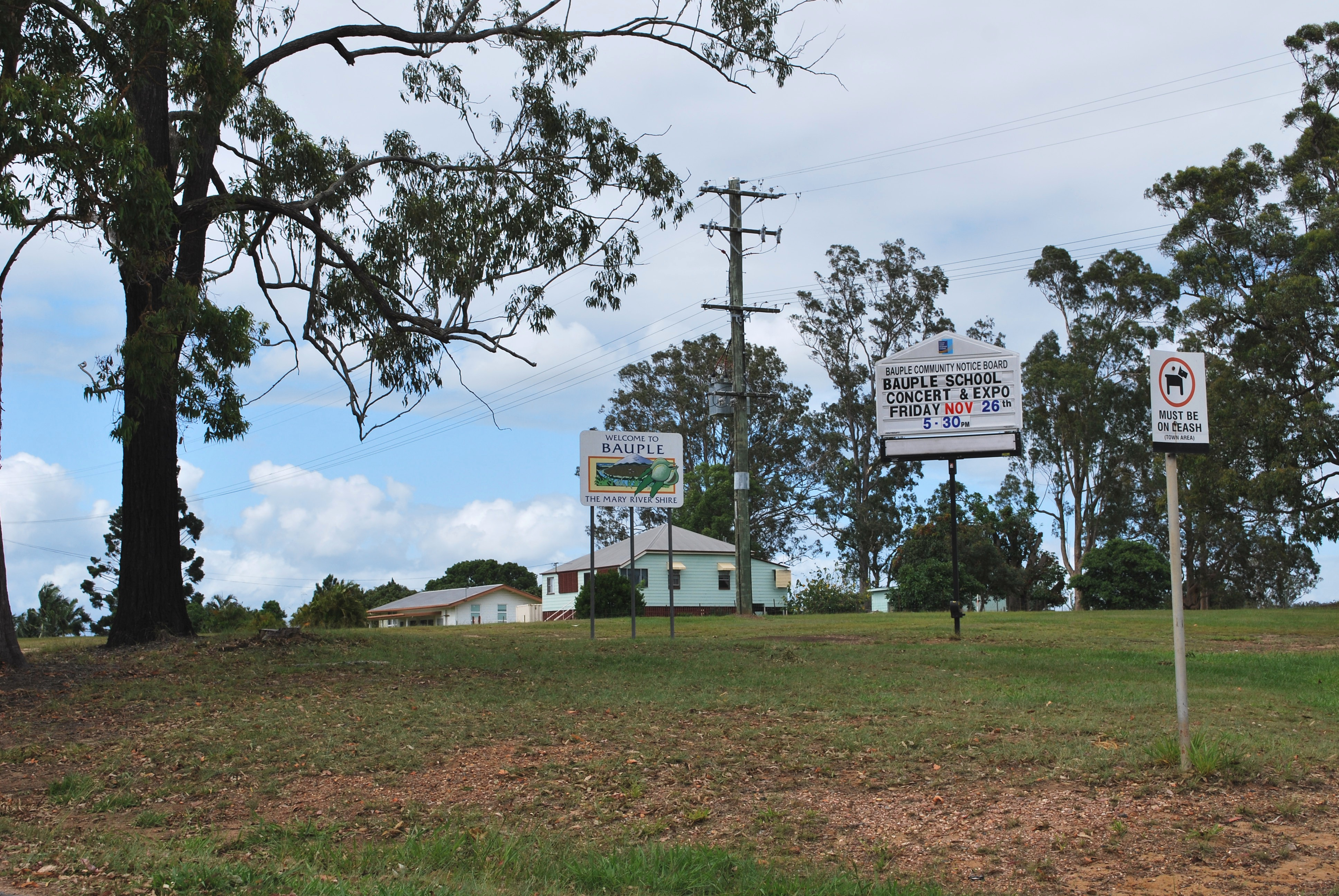
- Entering Bauple, 2010

- Interactive map of Bauple
- Coordinates: 25.8138°S 152.6219°E
- Country: Australia
- State: Queensland
- LGA: Fraser Coast Region
- Location: 36.9 km (22.9 mi) SSW of Maryborough; 51.5 km (32.0 mi) N of Gympie; 66.8 km (41.5 mi) SSW of Hervey Bay; 218 km (135 mi) N of Brisbane

Government
  - State electorate: Gympie
  - Federal division: Wide Bay

Area
  - Total: 82.0 km^{2} (31.7 sq mi)

Population
  - Total: 745 (2021 census)
  - Density: 9.085/km^{2} (23.531/sq mi)
- Time zone: UTC+10:00 (AEST)
- Postcode: 4650
Localities around Bauple
Tiaro	Tiaro	Talegall Weir
Netherby	Bauple	Bauple Forest
Gundiah	Gootchie	Bauple Forest

Bauple (/ˈbɒpəl/ BOP-əl) is a rural town and locality in the Fraser Coast Region, Queensland, Australia. In the 2021 census, the locality of Bauple had a population of 745 people.

== Geography ==
Bauple is principally flat farming land (elevation 50 metres). The locality contains the following mountains:

- Grassy Mountain in the south of the locality (25.8520°S 152.5988°E) 270 metres (890 ft)
- Guyra Mountain in the west of the locality (25.8148°S 152.5758°E) 457 metres (1,499 ft)
- Mount Bauple in the west of the locality (25.8082°S 152.5761°E) 489 metres (1,604 ft)

The town is located centrally within the locality. The Bruce Highway passes through the location from south to north, bypassing the town to the east. The town is now accessed Bauple Drive, the former route of the Bruce Highway before the town was bypassed.

Sugarcane is the major crop in the area.

== History ==
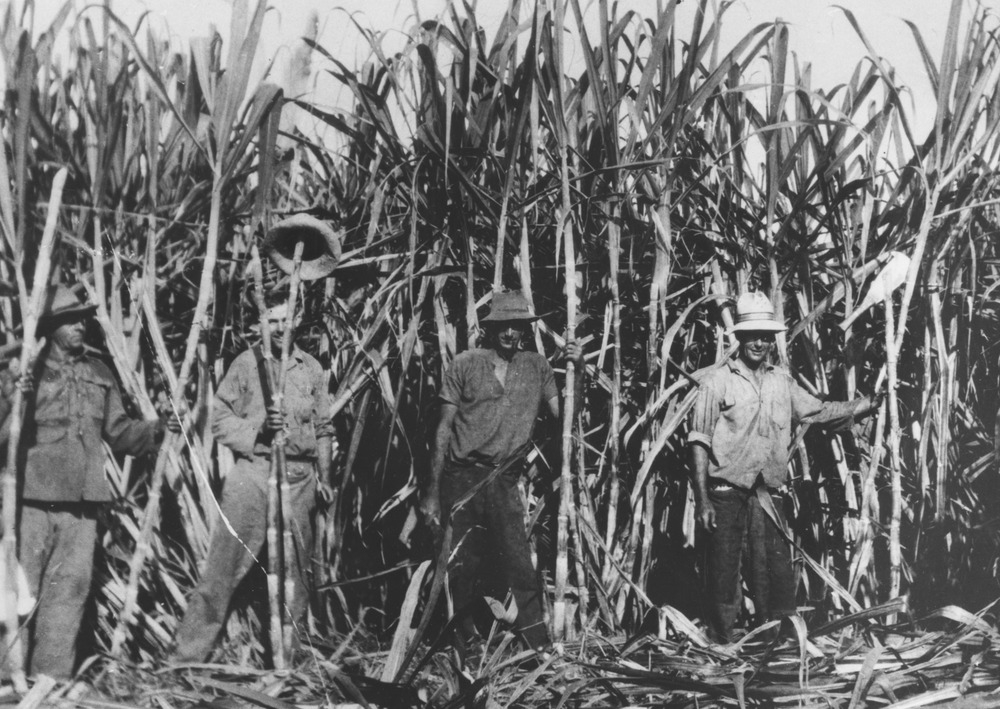
Sugarcane workers in the canefields in the Bauple district, circa 1920

The town was originally called Raby but the name was changed to Bauple on 20 November 1896, named after Mount Bauple. Bauple is believed to be derived from an Aboriginal word baupval in the Kabi language referring to a frilled lizard. In the Dreamtime, the spirit of the lizard guarded the sacred place on the mountain where stone axes were obtained.

In 1858, bauple nuts were discovered in Bauple; they are known locally as Bauple nuts or Queensland nuts, but internationally as macadamia nuts.

Mount Bauple Provisional School opened on 7 February 1887. In 1888, it renamed Mount Bopple Provisional School. On 1 January 1909, it became Mount Bopple State School. It closed in September 1928 due to low student numbers. It reopened in March 1931, but and closed permanently on 10 February 1933.

The Mount Bauple sugar mill was established in 1896; it was the largest in the district. There were cane tramways to deliver the harvested sugarcane to the mill at 26 Mill Street (25.81739°S 152.62118°E). In 1907, the Gundiah-Bauple Tramway was completed, connecting the mill to the Gundiah railway station on the North Coast railway line. The mill closed in 1951, as the sugarcane was then being sent to mills in Nambour and Maryborough.

Raby State School opened on 8 July 1901 with 58 students. It was renamed Bauple State School on 16 May 1935.

Rossendale State School opened on 28 January 1919 and closed in 1962. It was on the southern side of Bauple Drive (25.8400°S 152.5960°E); it presumably takes its name from nearby Rossendale Creek.

The Bauple Brass Band opened the Bauple Band Hall on Saturday 7 November 1925.

St Mark's Anglican Church was dedicated on 5 March 1926 by Archdeacon Glover. It closed circa 1979.

On Sunday 11 March 1928, Archbishop James Duhig officially opened and dedicated a Catholic church in Bauple. The timber church was built in the pointed Gothic style. It was 50 by 26 feet (15.2 by 7.9 m) and could seat 100 people. The architect was P.O.E. Hawkes of Maryborough and the contractors were Walter Oscar Nielsen and Mr Jorgensen. The church subsequently closed and was privately owned. Later it was purchased for use as the Lighthouse Christian Church.

Ironbark Ridge State School opened on 31 January 1939 with 20 students under teacher Mr Achillies. The school building was the relocated former Boonooroo State School building. In December 1940, a measles outbreak in the area reduced the student attendance to 3 students. It had a period of closure before reopening on 20 August 1951 under teacher Miss Frances Clare Albrey. The school closed permanently on 31 December 1960. It was on the western side of the Bruce Highway (25.7774°S 152.6042°E). When the Bruce Highway was realigned to bypass Bauple to the west in the 1970s, the current street address of the former school site is 947 Bauple Drive.

Bauple Uniting Church was dedicated and opened on 27 August 1996.

== Demographics ==
In the 2011 census, the locality of Bauple had a population of 732 people.

In the 2016 census, the locality of Bauple had a population of 644 people.

In the 2021 census, the locality of Bauple had a population of 745 people.

== Education ==
Bauple State School is a government primary (Prep–6) school for boys and girls at 44 Forestry Road (25.8121°S 152.6228°E). In 2017, the school had an enrolment of 47 students with 3 teachers (2 full-time equivalent) and 7 non-teaching staff (4 full-time equivalent). In 2018, the school had an enrolment of 36 students with 3 teachers (2 full-time equivalent) and 5 non-teaching staff (3 full-time equivalent).

There is no secondary school in Bauple. The nearest government secondary schools are Maryborough State High School in Maryborough to the north-east and James Nash State High School in Gympie to the south.

== Amenities ==
Bauple Uniting Church is at 17 Main Street (25.8134°S 152.6187°E).

Lighthouse Christian Church is at 20–22 Main Street (25.8123°S 152.6197°E). The church building was formerly a Catholic church.

Bauple Recreation Reserve is on the corner of Mackellar Street and Forestry Road. It has sports fields, a playground and an undercover stage for performances.

Brian Talman Park is on Darwin Road (25.8563°S 152.6291°E). It has barbeque and picnic facilities.

Bauple Rural Fire Station is on the corner of Stottenville Road and Mill Street (25.8162°S 152.6251°E).

Bauple Band Hall is on 5 Band Hall Road (corner of Main Street, 25.8143°S 152.6187°E).

== Attractions ==
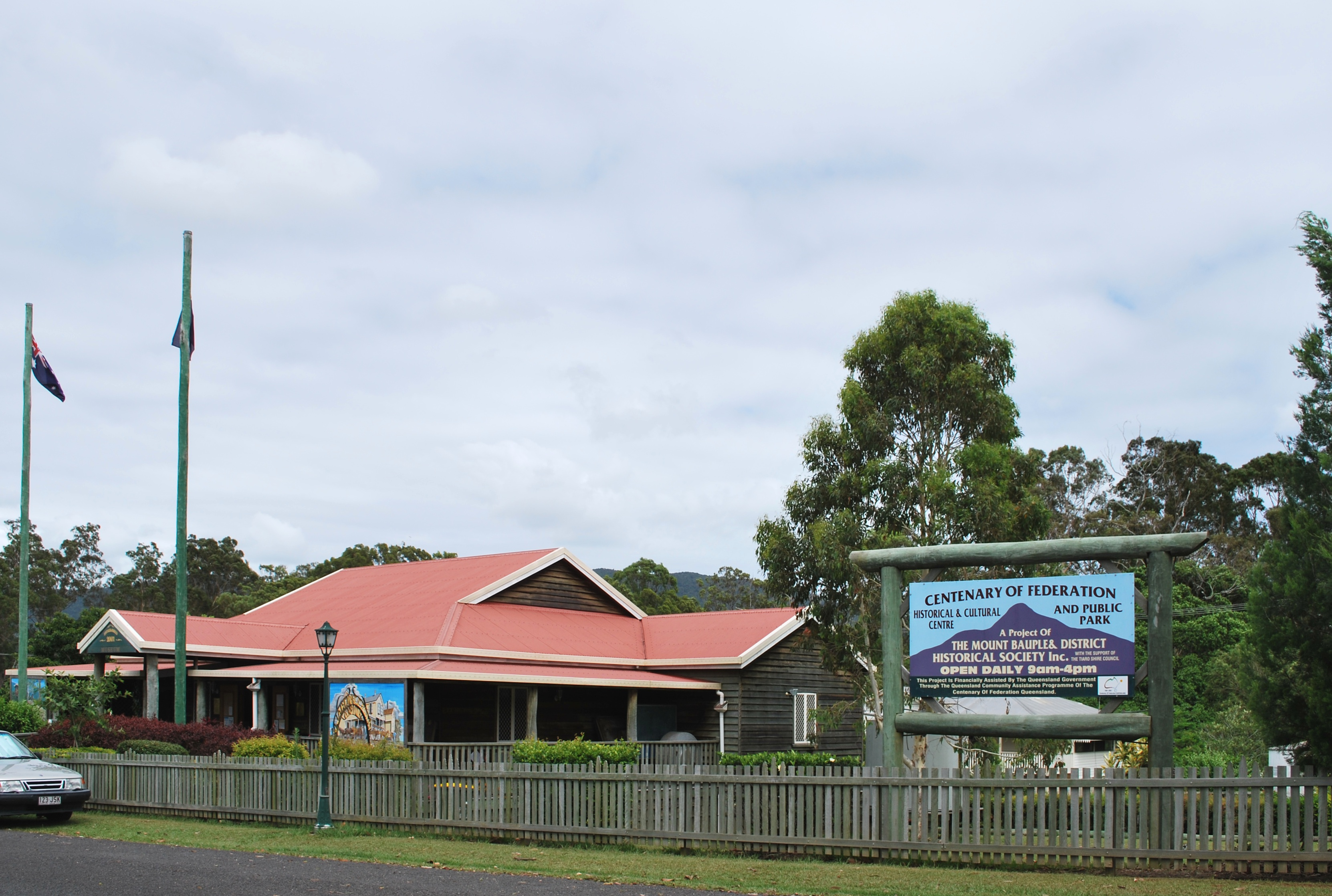
Bauple Historical & Cultural Centre, 2010

The Mount Bauple Museum is operated by the Mount Bauple and District Historical Society. One exhibit is a crocodile skin from a crocodile found in the Mary River near Owanyilla in 1964. The society have also restored a 1907 Fowler-built locomotive used at the Isis Sugar Mill, similar to one used at the Mount Bauple mill.

There is a self-guided heritage trail through the town passing 24 historic sites.

== Events ==
The Bauple Nut Bash is held annually in the Bauple Recreation Grounds.

The Bauple Band Hall Markets are on the 4th Saturday of the month at the Band Hall and on the Band Hall Green corner of Band Hall Road and Main Street Bauple.

== Notable people ==
Notable people who come from or have resided in Bauple include:

- Charles Trussell, brass band composer
