= Talegalla Weir, Queensland =

Talegalla Weir
- Suburb
- Interactive map of Talegalla Weir
- Coordinates: 25.7866°S 152.6872°E
- Country: Australia
- State: Queensland
- LGA: Fraser Coast Region
- Location: 41.8 km (26.0 mi) S of Maryborough; 65.4 km (40.6 mi) N of Gympie; 74.9 km (46.5 mi) S of Hervey Bay; 237 km (147 mi) N of Brisbane

Government
  - State electorates: Maryborough; Gympie
  - Federal division: Wide Bay

Area
  - Total: 50.7 km^{2} (19.6 sq mi)

Population
  - Total: 127 (2021 census)
  - Density: 2.505/km^{2} (6.49/sq mi)
- Time zone: UTC+10:00 (AEST)
- Postcode: 4650
Suburbs around Talegalla Weir
Tiaro	Tuan Forest	Tuan Forest
Bauple	Talegalla Weir	Tuan Forest
Bauple	Bauple Forest	Tuan Forest

Talegalla Weir is a locality in the Fraser Coast Region, Queensland, Australia. In the 2021 census, Talegalla Weir had a population of 127 people.

== Geography ==
The locality presumably takes its name from the Talegalla Weir across Tinana Creek (a tributary of the Mary River) on the eastern boundary of the locality (25.76611°S 152.70721°E). It is part of the Mary Basin Water Plan which supplies urban water and also for agriculture. The Teddington Weir Water Supply Scheme (WSS) specifically manages Tinana Creek. Its primary water storage is Teddington Weir with a capacity of 3,710 megalitres (131×10^{6} cu ft). Talegalla Weir is further upstream and provides additional but smaller storage of 385 megalitres (13.6×10^{6} cu ft).

== History ==
The weir was originally called Tallagalla Weir, but the spelling was changed to Talegalla Weir on 23 August 1985.

== Demographics ==
In the 2016 census, Talegalla Weir had a population of 123 people.

In the 2021 census, Talegalla Weir had a population of 127 people.

== Education ==
There are no schools in Talegalla Weir. The nearest government primary school is Bauple State School in neighbouring Bauple to the south-west. The nearest government secondary school is Maryborough State High School in Maryborough to the north. There are also non-government schools in Maryborough.
