= Boonooroo, Queensland =

Boonooroo
- Town
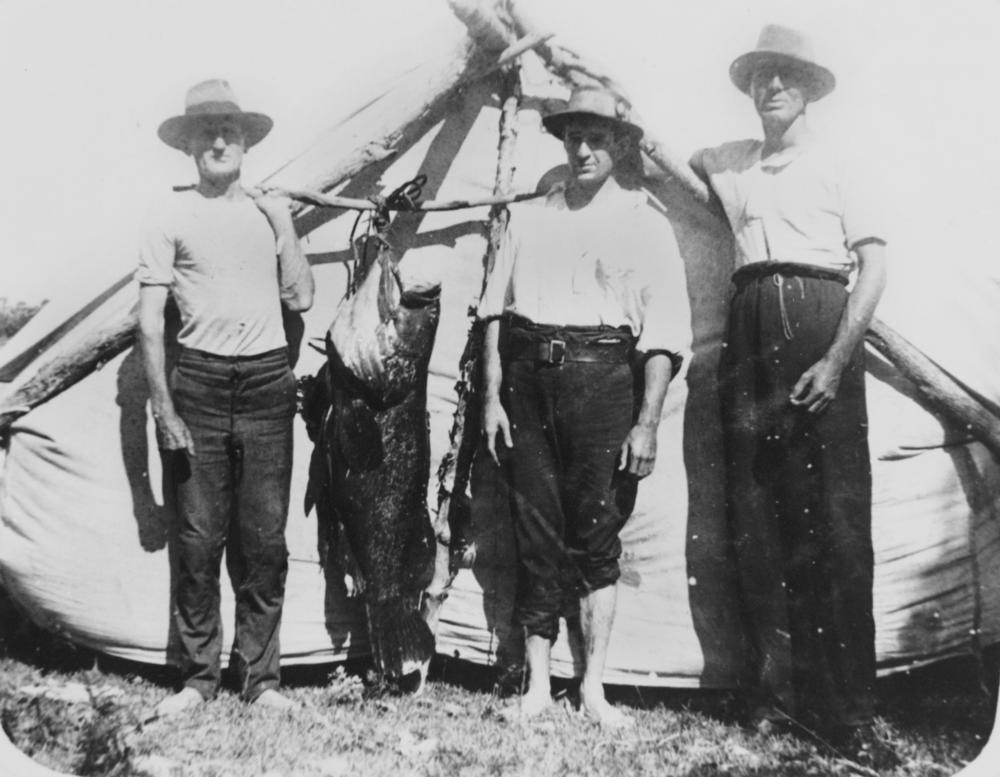
- Fishing party with a large codfish, Boonooroo, circa 1920

- Interactive map of Boonooroo
- Coordinates: 25.6683°S 152.9019°E
- Country: Australia
- State: Queensland
- LGA: Fraser Coast Region
- Location: 24.0 km (14.9 mi) SE of Granville; 25.3 km (15.7 mi) SE of Maryborough; 56.2 km (34.9 mi) SSE of Hervey Bay; 260 km (160 mi) N of Brisbane

Government
  - State electorate: Maryborough
  - Federal division: Wide Bay

Area
  - Total: 10.5 km^{2} (4.1 sq mi)

Population
  - Total: 371 (2021 census)
  - Density: 35.33/km^{2} (91.5/sq mi)
- Time zone: UTC+10:00 (AEST)
- Postcode: 4650
Localities around Boonooroo
Boonooroo Plains	Great Sandy Strait	Great Sandy Strait
Tuan Forest	Boonooroo	Great Sandy Strait
Tuan	Great Sandy Strait	Great Sandy Strait

Boonooroo is a coastal town and locality in the Fraser Coast Region, Queensland, Australia. In the 2021 census, the locality of Boonooroo had a population of 371 people.

== Geography ==
The Great Sandy Strait forms the eastern and southern boundaries.

== History ==
The town's name is an Aboriginal word meaning the brigalow tree (Acacia harpopylla).

Boonooroo State School opened in 1911. It closed in May 1931. In November 1938, it was decided to relocated the school building to be used for the new Ironbark Ridge State School north of Bauple. On 30 September 1946, a new Boonooroo Provisional School reopened under Miss Elwyn Margaret Rose Boughen. It became Boonooroo State School in 1960. It then closed in 1961.

== Demographics ==
In the 2016 census, the locality of Boonooroo had a population of 322 people.

In the 2021 census, the locality of Boonooroo had a population of 371 people.

== Education ==
There are no schools in Boonooroo. The nearest government primary school is Granville State School in Granville to the north-west. The nearest government secondary school is Maryborough State High School in Maryborough to the north-west.
