= Kanigan, Queensland =

Kanigan
- Suburb
- Interactive map of Kanigan
- Coordinates: 25.9277°S 152.5861°E
- Country: Australia
- State: Queensland
- LGAs: Fraser Coast Region; Gympie Region
- Location: 37.4 km (23.2 mi) N of Gympie; 50.7 km (31.5 mi) SSW of Maryborough; 80.7 km (50.1 mi) SSW of Hervey Bay; 212 km (132 mi) N of Brisbane

Government
  - State electorate: Gympie
  - Federal division: Wide Bay

Area
  - Total: 22.3 km^{2} (8.6 sq mi)

Population
  - Total: 143 (2021 census)
  - Density: 6.41/km^{2} (16.61/sq mi)
- Postcode: 4570
Suburbs around Kanigan
Gootchie	Gootchie	Glenwood
Theebine	Kanigan	Glenwood
Theebine	Gunalda	Glenwood

Kanigan (pronounced kan-i-an) is a rural locality split between the Fraser Coast Region and the Gympie Region, both in Queensland, Australia. In the 2021 census, Kanigan had a population of 143 people.

== Geography ==
Kanyan Road forms the northern boundary of the locality, while the Bruce Highway runs along the eastern boundary.

The locality has the following mountains:

- Mount Kanigan in the north-west of the locality (25.9267°S 152.5811°E), rising to 327 metres (1,073 ft) above sea level.
- Theebine Mountain in the south-west of the locality (25.9469°S 152.5682°E) 312 metres (1,024 ft)

Deacons Creek rises in the southern part of the locality and flows through to the north-east, where it exits.

Mount Kanigan Nature Refuge is a .2 square kilometres (0.077 sq mi) private nature reserve on Repeater Station Road.

The 128 km Gympie (Mt Kanigan) Radar Loop in the south west of the locality is a doppler radar station that is part of the National Radar Loop of the Bureau of Meteorology.

The land use is predominantly grazing on native vegetation with small amounts of crop growing and rural residential housing.

== History ==
Kanyan railway station is in the adjacent locality of Theebine. The name of this station was changed to Kanigan in July 1945 and changed back to Kanyan in December the same year. In 1881 when the Maryborough to Gympie railway opened the station was described as "in the middle of a dense weedy pine scrub, known ... as Ramsay's, where there is nothing but a few tents and perhaps a truck or so of palings to indicate that the spot is a railway station named Kanyan. [It] .. derives its title from the aboriginal name 'Kanyn' given to the creek and mountain close by.

Another version of the word Kanyan is that it is derived from the Aboriginal word, Kabi language, kanigan indicating daughter.

Kannagan Provisional School opened on 6 July 1896. By 1898 the spelling of the name had changed to be Kanighan Provisional School. On 1 January 1909, it became Kanighan State School. About 1946, the spelling changed to Kanigan State School. It closed in 1959. It was on the western corner of the junction of Kanyan Road and the Bruce Highway (approx 25.9042°S 152.5981°E), now within the present-day boundaries of Gootchie.

== Demographics ==
In the 2016 census, Kanigan had a population of 114 people.

In the 2021 census, Kanigan had a population of 143 people.

== Education ==
There are no schools in Kanigan. The nearest government primary schools are Glenwood State School in neighbouring Glenwood to the west, Gunalda State School in neighbouring Gunalda to the south, and Theebine State School in neighbouring Theebine to the south-west. The nearest government secondary school is James Nash State High School in Gympie to the south. There are also a number of non-government schools in Gympie and surrounding suburbs.
