= Netherby, Queensland =

Netherby
- Suburb
- Interactive map of Netherby
- Coordinates: 25.7811°S 152.5316°E
- Country: Australia
- State: Queensland
- LGA: Fraser Coast Region
- Location: 32.7 km (20.3 mi) SW of Maryborough; 55.8 km (34.7 mi) N of Gympie; 65.8 km (40.9 mi) SW of Hervey Bay; 235 km (146 mi) N of Brisbane

Government
  - State electorate: Gympie
  - Federal division: Wide Bay

Area
  - Total: 42.7 km^{2} (16.5 sq mi)

Population
  - Total: 25 (2021 census)
  - Density: 0.585/km^{2} (1.52/sq mi)
- Time zone: UTC+10:00 (AEST)
- Postcode: 4650
Suburbs around Netherby
St Mary	Tiaro	Tiaro
Mount Urah	Netherby	Bauple
Gundiah	Gundiah	Bauple

Netherby is a rural locality in the Fraser Coast Region, Queensland, Australia. In the 2021 census, Netherby had a population of 25 people.

== Geography ==
The Mary River forms the western and north-western boundaries.

Penny Mountain is in the east of the locality (25.7827°S 152.5626°E) and rises to 241 metres (791 ft) above sea level.

The North Coast railway line enters the locality from the south (Gundiah) and exits to the north (Tiaro). The locality is served by:

- Netherby railway station (25.7738°S 152.5458°E)
- Bongmollow railway station, now abandoned (25.7974°S 152.5471°E)

The land use is predominantly grazing on native vegetation.

== History ==
The locality presumably takes its name from its railway station, which in turn was named by the Queensland Railways Department after the town in Scotland, thought to have some connection to a settler.

Deborah Provisional School opened on 28 April 1885. On 1 January 1909, it became Deborah State School, but then closed on 31 December 1910. It reopened on 1 March 1921 as a half-time school in conjunction with Mount Urah Provisional School (meaning the two schools shared a single teacher). On 4 April 1927, the closure of Mount Urah School enabled Deborah State School to become a full-time school once again. It closed on 5 June 1939. The school was on Deborah Road (approx 25.78460°S 152.49088°E).

== Demographics ==
In the 2016 census, Netherby had a population of 39 people.

In the 2021 census, Netherby had a population of 25 people.

== Education ==
There are no schools in Netherby. The nearest government primary schools are Tiaro State School in neighbouring Tiaro to the north and Gundiah State School in neighbouring Gundiah to the south. The nearest government secondary school is Maryborough State High School in Maryborough to the north-east.

== Facilities ==
Deborah Cemetery is at 751 Deborah Road (25.7830°S 152.4940°E).
