= Shire of Granville =

Local government area of Queensland, Australia

Coordinates: 25.536°S 152.728°E

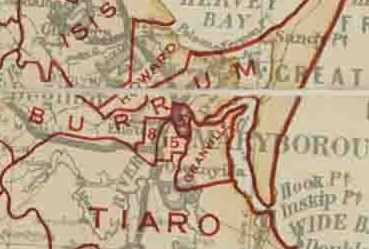
Map of Granville Division and adjacent local government areas, March 1902. Legend: Maryborough Municipality (3), Antigua Division (8), Tinana Division (15)

The Shire of Granville is a former local government area in the Wide Bay–Burnett area of Queensland, Australia.

== History ==
On 11 November 1879, the Tinana Division was created as one of 74 divisions within Queensland under the Divisional Boards Act 1879. On 14 September 1883, part of Tinana Division was separated to create the new Granville Division. On 8 November 1883, there was an adjustment of the boundaries between them.

With the passage of the Local Authorities Act 1902, the Granville Division became the Shire of Granville on 31 March 1903.

The Shire of Granville was abolished on 17 Feb 1917, being split between the City of Maryborough and the Shire of Tiaro.
