= Poona National Park =

National park in Queensland, Australia

- IUCN category II (national park)
- Location within Queensland
- Location: Queensland
- Nearest city: Maryborough
- Coordinates: 25°35′20″S 152°49′22″E
- Area: 5,368 ha (20.73 sq mi)
- Established: 1991
- Governing body: Queensland Parks and Wildlife Service

Poona National Park is located in the Fraser Coast Region, Queensland, Australia. It is a wildlife refuge with some endangered trees and animals.

== Geography ==
The national park occupies the central and eastern parts of the locality of Boonooroo Plains and the northern part of Boonooroo. It is 210 km north of Brisbane and 6 km southeast from Maryborough. It is a wildlife refuge with some endangered trees and animals.

== Facilities ==
Mostly marshy and forested between rivers and the sea, this area has no designated walking trails. However, the park still permits fishing in a designated area at Kalah Creek, and encourages small nature-based activities such as photography. Camping is not allowed in the park.

== See also ==
- Protected areas of Queensland
