= Gundiah railway station =

Former railway station in Queensland, Australia

Gundiah

General information
- Location: Railway Street, Gundiah, Queensland
- Coordinates: 25°49′56″S 152°32′35″E
- Line: North Coast Line
- Connections: no connections

History
- Closed: Yes

Services
Preceding station	Queensland Rail	Following station
Paterson towards Brisbane	North Coast line	Netherby towards Cairns
Location

Gundiah railway station is a closed railway station on the North Coast railway line in Queensland, Australia. In 1922, a goods train derailed at the railway station.

== 1922 derailment ==
On 24 November 1922, a train carrying goods derailed while shunting at Gundiah. The brake van fell across the North Coast line, making Gundiah impassable for many days. Several wagons of goods were also derailed. At about 7pm, the driver of the train was moving the entire consist forward, however, the train failed to move up the grade. The driver reversed to make another attempt at the grade, however "part of the train ran back onto the main line, and part onto the siding at Gundiah Station". Nobody was injured.
