= Great Sandy Strait =

- Suburb
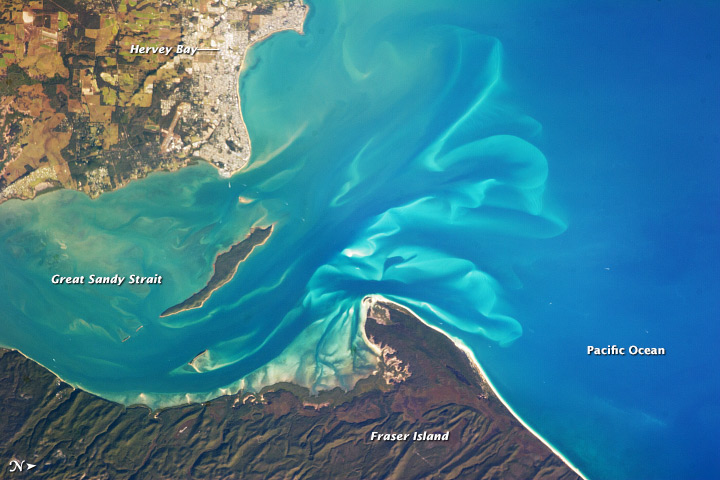
- Great Sandy Strait from orbit

- Interactive map of Great Sandy Strait
- Coordinates: 25.5416°S 152.925°E
- Country: Australia
- State: Queensland
- LGA: Fraser Coast Region

Government
  - State electorates: Hervey Bay; Maryborough
  - Federal divisions: Wide Bay; Hinkler

Area
  - Total: 613.2 km^{2} (236.8 sq mi)

Population
  - Total: 0 (2021 census)
  - Density: 0.0000/km^{2} (0.0000/sq mi)
- Time zone: UTC+10:00 (AEST)
- Postcode: 4655
Suburbs around Great Sandy Strait
Urangan; Booral; River Heads; Susan River	Hervey Bay	K'gari
Tandora; Beaver Rock; The Dimonds; Maaroom	Great Sandy Strait	K'gari
Boonooroo Plains; Boonooroo; Tuan; Tuan Forest; Poona	Tuan Forest; Tinnanbar; Tin Can Bay; Inskip	K'gari

The Great Sandy Strait is a strait in the Australian state of Queensland of 70 kilometres (43 mi) length which separates mainland Queensland from K'gari. It is also an offshore locality in the Fraser Coast Region local government area. To the north of the strait is Hervey Bay. In the 2021 census, Great Sandy Strait had "no people or a very low population".

== Geography ==
The Great Sandy Strait extends south from Hervey Bay to Inskip Point. The Mary River enters the strait at River Heads. It covers an area of 932 square kilometres (360 sq mi). The southern entrance to the strait is about 2 kilometres (1.2 mi) wide.

There are numerous named and unnamed islands in the strait. The named island are from north to south: Big Woody Island, Round Island, Little Woody Island, Picnic Island, Duck Island, Walsh Island, Turkey Island, Bookar Island, Thomas Island, Slain Island, Tooth Island, Round Bush Island, New Island, Garden Island, Dream Island, and Stewart Island.

Most of the island are low and sandy in character. Only a few have significant elevations, e.g. Big Woody Island rises to 50 metres (160 ft) above sea level. Although most of the islands are uninhabitable, there is a small area of residential development on the north-west of Stewart Island (25.6161°S 152.9536°E).

== History ==
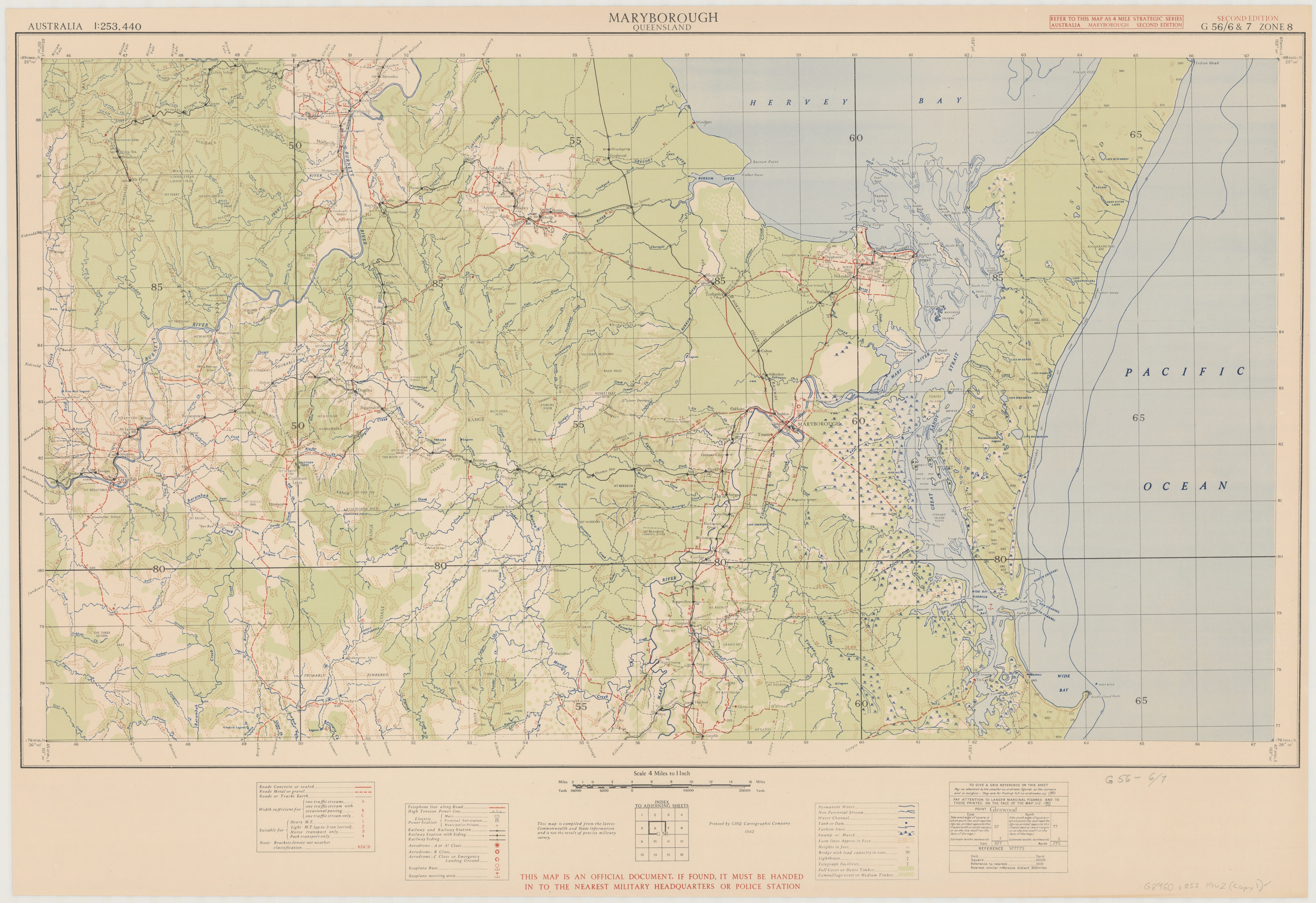
Map of Hervey Bay and surrounds, 1942

In July and August 1799 Matthew Flinders chartered the coast from Moreton Bay to Hervey Bay in the Norfolk. Although he established that K'gari was not a peninsula (as was then believed) but an island, he failed to find a navigable channel through the Great Sandy Strait. His explorations of the area is commemorated by a monument called Matthew Flinders Lookout at the top of an escarpment facing the bay in Dayman Park, Urangan (25.2893°S 152.9080°E).

Lieutenant Joseph Dayman was the first European to navigate through the Great Sandy Strait on 10 November 1846 in a small decked boat called the Asp. It had been intended that Dayman rendezvous with HMS Rattlesnake but that ship had already departed. Dayman decided it was safer to take the Asp through the Great Sandy Strait rather than risk taking the route to the ocean side of K'gari as he was concerned about rounding the Breaksea Spit.

== Demographics ==
In the 2016 census, Great Sandy Strait had a population of 4 people.

In the 2021 census, Great Sandy Strait had "no people or a very low population".

== Economy ==
Tourism and commercial fishing are the two main industries that are active within the Strait. Boating and fishing are also pursued for recreation.

== Education ==
There are no schools in Great Sandy Strait. There are numerous mainland schools near the strait, but access would depend on having transport to the mainland. The alternatives are distance education and boarding school.

== Environment ==
A complex landscape of mangroves, sandbanks, intertidal sand, mud islands, salt marshes and seagrass beds, the Strait is an important habitat for breeding fish, crustaceans, dugongs, dolphins and marine turtles. Migrating humpback whales use the calms waters of the strait to rest for a few days between July and November. An analysis of commercial catch data in the area between 1988 and 2003 revealed a significant reduction in fish stock. The campaign against the Traveston Crossing Dam included claims the dam would have a significant environmental impact on the Great Sandy Strait. It is located within the boundaries of the Great Sandy Marine Park and adjoins other protected areas within or adjacent to the Strait include Great Sandy National Park, Poona National Park and Great Sandy Conservation Park.

== Birds ==
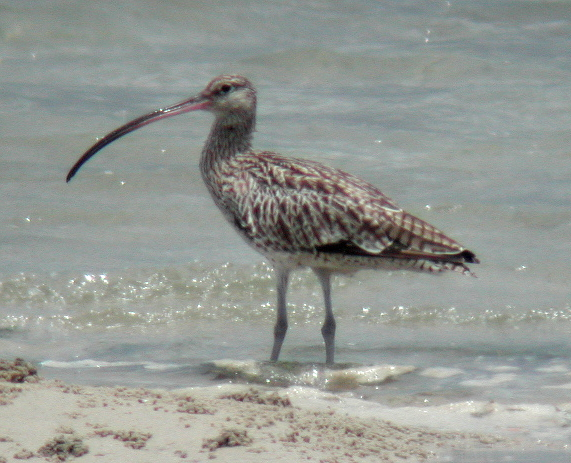
Great Sandy Strait is an important site for eastern curlews

Designations

Ramsar Wetland
- Official name: Great Sandy Strait
- Designated: 14 June 1999
- Reference no.: 992

The lower part of Great Sandy Strait was listed under the Ramsar Convention as a wetland of international significance in 1999. The area is also an important roosting site for CAMBA and JAMBA listed species. Some 806 km^{2} of the strait has been identified by BirdLife International as an Important Bird Area because it supports about 120,000 non-breeding waders, including over 1% of the global populations of bar-tailed godwits, eastern curlews, great knots, grey-tailed tattlers, lesser sand plovers, pied oystercatchers, red-necked stints and red-capped plovers, as well as small numbers of the range-restricted mangrove honeyeater.

== Events ==
Each year in June the Bay to Bay yacht race is sailed on the Great Sandy Strait. It is run by the Hervey Bay Sailing Club.

== See also ==
- Hinchinbrook Channel
- List of Ramsar sites in Australia
- Pumicestone Passage
- Great Sandy Biosphere Reserve
