= George Seymour (Australian politician) =

Australian politician

Councillor George Seymour
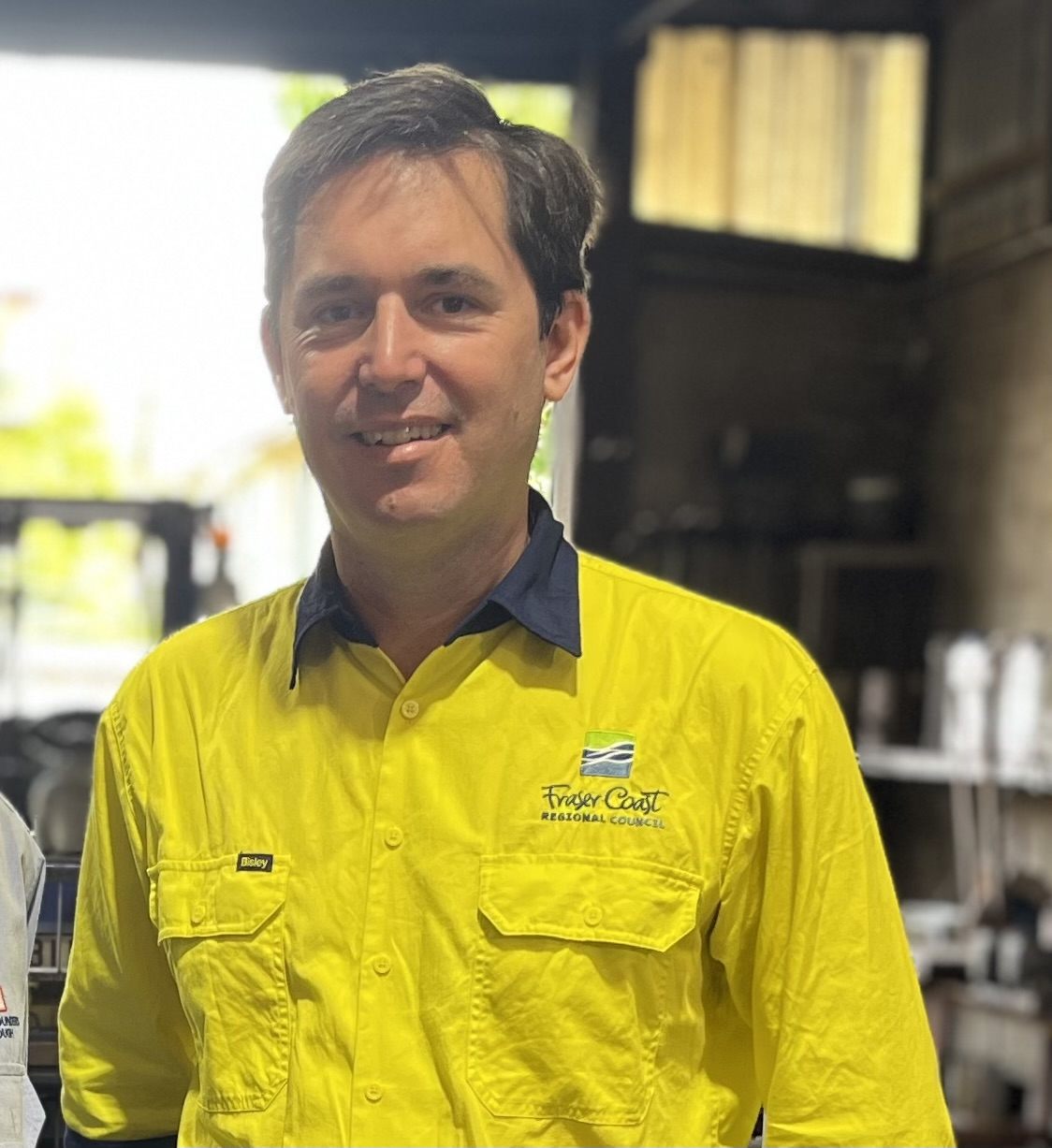

Mayor of Fraser Coast
- Incumbent
- Assumed office 5 May 2018
- Deputy: Sara Faraj
- Preceded by: Chris Loft

Deputy Mayor of Fraser Coast
- In office 1 May 2013 – 5 May 2018
- Preceded by: Trevor McDonald
- Succeeded by: Darren Everard

Fraser Coast Councillor for Division 10
- In office 28 April 2012 – 5 May 2018
- Preceded by: New division
- Succeeded by: Zane O'Keefe

Personal details
- Party: Independent Labor
- Spouse: Melissa Seymour
- Children: 1
- Education: University of the Sunshine Coast; Queensland University of Technology
- Occupation: Lawyer; Disability Support Worker

George Nathan Seymour is an Australian politician currently serving as the mayor of Fraser Coast Region in Queensland. Prior to his election to the mayoralty in a 2018 by-election, Seymour served as the Deputy mayor of Fraser Coast from 2013 to 2018, and the Councillor for Division 10 from 2012 to 2018. He also served as Acting Mayor between February and May 2018. Seymour was re-elected in 2020 with one of the highest primary votes in the State of 77.55% and again in 2024 with a primary vote of 74.89%.

== Early life and career ==
Prior to his election to the Fraser Coast Regional Council, Seymour ran the region's youth homeless shelter.

He was the Deputy Chairperson of the Queensland Heritage Council and has published books about Queensland history and architecture, including biographies of the writer Cecil Lowther (Bannerman) and the architect Philip Oliver Ellard Hawkes. His book "Public Life", which was first published in 2022, is a history of local government in Maryborough, Queensland and the 52 people who served as the mayor of Maryborough from the period of Maryborough Council being formed in 1861 and being amalgamated into the Fraser Coast Region in 2008. His most recent book “A Visit to Maryborough City Hall” covers the social, political and architectural history of the heritage listed Maryborough City Hall.

== Fraser Coast Council ==
During Seymour's time as mayor, the economy of the Fraser Coast has significantly grown, with the value of commercial projects going from under $300 million in 2019 to nearly $3 billion in 2024.

The Fraser Coast region has traditionally been an area of high unemployment. One of the key priorities of George Seymour's time as mayor has been addressing this through attracting industry, supporting training programs and creating initiatives like Fraser Coast Jobs Ready, which is a program run by the Fraser Coast Regional Council with federal government funding.

== Other Positions ==
George Seymour is the chairperson of the Fraser Coast Local Disaster Management Group. In this role he has led the region's response to disasters, including two major floods of the Mary River (Queensland) in 2022 and Cyclone Alfred in 2025.

He has been on the national board of Regional Capitals Australia for a number of years, serving as treasurer and Queensland representative and was previously the chairperson of the Wide Bay Burnett Regional Organisation of Councils.

George Seymour is a member of the board of Regional Development Australia Wide Bay Burnett.

He is the Wide Bay Burnett representative on the policy executive of the Local Government Association of Queensland and a member of the Library Board of Queensland which governs the State Library of Queensland.

With Maryborough being the host city for the 2032 Summer Olympic and Paralympic Games Archery events, George Seymour is a member of the 2032 Host Mayors Advisory Group.

== Fraser Coast Economy ==
As mayor George Seymour has focused on diversifying and growing the Fraser Coast economy, with the attraction of new businesses and factories. Under his leadership, the Fraser Coast Regional Council adopted the Fraser Coast Futures 2036 economic development plan.

== Infrastructure ==
During his time as mayor, the Fraser Coast Regional Council has worked in partnership with the State and Federal Governments on a number of major infrastructure projects including sporting facilities, roads, libraries, community health facilities, and recreational facilities. Through securing funding from State and Federal Governments, he has worked with the University of the Sunshine Coast to build a turtle research and rehabilitation centre at Urangan.

Mayor Seymour officially opened the Fraser Coast's new Material Recovery Facility in 2025, improving the region's ability to recycle waste.
