= Maryborough State High School =

Coordinates: 25°32′01″S 152°41′54″E

- 510–528 Kent St; Maryborough, Queensland, 4650; Australia

Information
- Type: Public, co-educational, secondary, day school
- Motto: Non Sine Pulvere Palma
- Established: 1881
- School district: North Coast Region
- Principal: Simon Done
- Grades: 7 to 12
- Enrolment: 1260 (2024)
- Campus: Rural
- Colours: Brown and blue. Junior uniform is grey and blue, with senior uniform grey and white. The school colours reflect the 47th "Wide Bay" Battalion.
- Slogan: Valued, Developed, Empowered
- Sports: Soccer, hockey, futsal, rugby union, rowing, basketball
- Mascot: Kingi – Kingfisher
- Website: maryboroughshs.eq.edu.au

Maryborough State High School (commonly abbreviated as 'MSHS') is a public high school located in Maryborough, Queensland, Australia. The school is run by the Queensland State Government, and is split on either side of Kent Street. The school colours are blue and brown. In 2025 MSHS had 1260 students (including 150 students identifying as indigenous) with 102 teachers and 100 non-teaching staff (60 full-time equivalent).

The school has had many incarnations, starting its life as Maryborough Boys Grammar School and Maryborough Girls Grammar School, then from 1937 a segregated boys and girls state high school. The school became coeducational from 1974. From 2017, Maryborough State High School is an Independent Public School. The school is now the largest secondary school in Maryborough, with more than 50% of all students in Maryborough attending Maryborough SHS.

== History ==
The Maryborough Boys Grammar School was founded on the north side of Kent Street in 1881 and the Maryborough Girls Grammar School on the south of Kent Street in 1883. An assembly hall was added to the side of the Girls Grammar School in 1888. Four Rhodes scholars graduated from Maryborough Boys Grammar School and many students went on to distinguished careers. Hit hard by the effects of the Great Depression, the Grammar Schools were forced to close. They were subsequently taken over by the Department of Education in 1936 to become the Maryborough State High and Intermediate School for Boys and Maryborough State High and Intermediate School for Girls.

The Boys' and Girls' High Schools were amalgamated in 1974 to form Maryborough State High School.

The original building of Maryborough Boys Grammar School was listed on the Queensland Heritage Register in 1992. It now houses the English and Humanities Departments.

Grade 12 2008, Photo taken in the Fairy Ring

== Location ==
The campus is situated on either side of Kent Street adjacent to the Maryborough CBD.

== Notable alumni and staff ==
Notable alumni of the school include:

- Duncan Chapman, first soldier of the Australian Imperial Forces to land at Gallipoli
- Gordon Dunbar, Rhodes Scholar, soldier awarded Military Cross and Croix de Guerre
- Geoff Dymock, cricketer
- William Glasgow, soldier and senator
- Jim Saleam, politician, white nationalist
- Henry Lionel Harvey, Rhodes Scholar, died World War I
- Robert Alexander Hunter, served at Gallipoli and was mayor of Maryborough (1956–1964)
- Grant Hayden Kenny, ironman champion
- Kay Lehmann (née Kindervater), hockey champion
- Percy Reginald Stephensen, Rhodes Scholar, writer and publisher
- David Theile, Olympic swimmer
- Robert Edwin White, Rhodes Scholar and professor of soil science

Staff who have worked at the school include Amy Hannah Adamson, who was both an alumna (Maryborough Girls' Grammar School) and headmistress (Maryborough State High and Intermediate School from 1949 to 1959).

There are currently over 26 alumni working at the school – former students who have returned to the school in many roles, from teacher aides to teaching staff, administration and Heads of Department.
