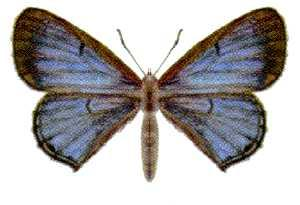

Conservation status
- Endangered (IUCN 2.3)

Scientific classification
- Kingdom: Animalia
- Phylum: Arthropoda
- Clade: Pancrustacea
- Class: Insecta
- Order: Lepidoptera
- Family: Lycaenidae
- Genus: Acrodipsas
- Species: A. illidgei

Binomial name
- Acrodipsas illidgei Waterhouse & Lyell, 1914

= Illidge's ant blue =

Illidge's ant-blue

Species of butterfly

Illidge's ant-blue butterfly (Acrodipsas illidgei), is an endangered species of butterfly endemic to Australia. This species can be found at six confirmed sites: Mary River Heads, Beaver Rock and Maaroom in the Fraser Coast Region (Queensland); Redland Bay and Point Halloran in the City of Redland (Queensland), and Brunswick Heads (New South Wales).

== Characteristics ==
The eggs of the Illidge's ant-blue butterfly are white and have an average diameter of 0.7 mm. In its caterpillar stage it is white. The pupa of the butterfly is approximately 1 cm lengthwise and is brown. As adults they are brown and the females of the species contain blue coloured regions on the surface of their wings that change shades depending on the angle from which the surface is being viewed. The ventral side of both genders of the butterfly are fawn in colour and contain small dark spots. The wingspan of the butterfly is approximately 2 cm.

== Ecology ==
The life cycle of the Illidge's ant-blue butterfly, from when the eggs are laid to when the butterfly finally emerges, is highly complex. It is also one of the best illustrations of the symbiotic relationship between organisms within mangrove systems. The eggs are laid by the females of the species in stubs on grey mangrove trees where there is a presence of Crematogaster ant colonies. The larvae are transported to the ants' nests by the ants where they feed on excretions from the larvae, while a larva on the other hand feeds on developing ants (perhaps its regurgitations). There have been no recorded natural enemies of the Illidge's ant-blue, except for the exposed immature stage as an egg to hunting spiders. The largest cause of mortality of the larvae has been the host ants turning hostile towards it. Fluffy scales cover the body of an emerging butterfly so as to protect it from such hostile attacks.

== Conservation ==
The essential threat to the existence of Illidge's ant-blue butterfly arises as a result of the destruction of mangrove habitats. Since numerous plants and animals are so heavily reliant on each other within the mangrove systems, its destruction also endangers the existence of other organisms such as crustaceans and molluscs. To prevent the extinction of the Illidge's ant-blue butterfly the state government of Queensland granted the species permanently protected status in 1990. This necessitated all collected samples of the species to be registered and made it illegal to collect the species without prior consent from relevant state officials.
