= The Dimonds, Queensland =

The Dimonds
- Suburb
- Interactive map of The Dimonds
- Coordinates: 25.5316°S 152.8525°E
- Country: Australia
- State: Queensland
- LGA: Fraser Coast Region
- Location: 22.8 km (14.2 mi) E of Maryborough; 53.8 km (33.4 mi) S of Hervey Bay; 282 km (175 mi) N of Brisbane

Government
  - State electorate: Maryborough
  - Federal division: Wide Bay

Area
  - Total: 16.8 km^{2} (6.5 sq mi)

Population
  - Total: 0 (2021 census)
  - Density: 0.000/km^{2} (0.00/sq mi)
- Time zone: UTC+10:00 (AEST)
- Postcode: 4650
Suburbs around The Dimonds
Beaver Rock	Beaver Rock	Great Sandy Strait
Beaver Rock	The Dimonds	Great Sandy Strait
Boonooroo Plains	Boonooroo Plains	Maaroom

The Dimonds is a rural locality in the Fraser Coast Region, Queensland, Australia. In the 2021 census, The Dimonds had "no people or a very low population".

== Geography ==
Kalah Creek forms the southern boundary, while several tidal inlets also drain to the Great Sandy Strait.

The locality is predominantly coastal tree swamps with Melaleuca and Eucalypt species predominating. The land is mostly undeveloped and unused. There is a small amount of residential and agricultural land use in the south-east of the locality.

== Demographics ==
In the 2016 census, The Dimonds had "no people or a very low population".

In the 2021 census, The Dimonds had "no people or a very low population".

== Education ==
There are no schools in The Dimonds. The nearest government primary school is Granville State School in Granville to the west. The nearest government secondary school is Maryborough State High School in Maryborough to the west.
