= Tandora =

Tandora may refer to:

- Tandora, Queensland, a locality in the Fraser Coast Region, Queensland, Australia
- Tandora County, a county in New South Wales, Australia
