= Torbanlea railway station =

Former railway station in Queensland, Australia

Torbanlea
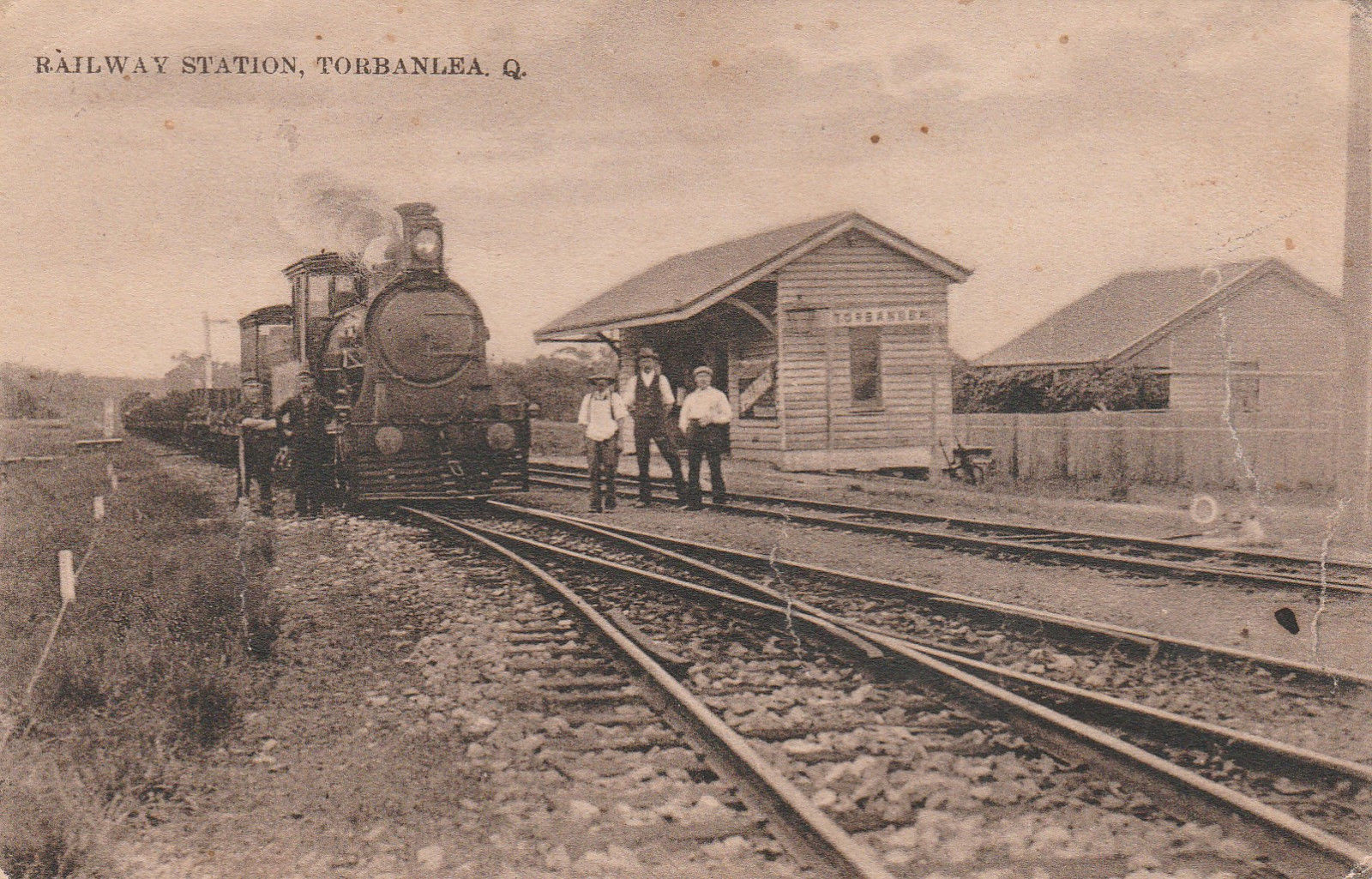
- Torbanlea railway station, early 1900s

General information
- Location: Robertson Street, Torbanlea, Queensland
- Coordinates: 25.34722°S 152.5977°E
- Line: North Coast Line
- Connections: no connections

History
- Opened: 1883
- Closed: 1900

Services
Preceding station	Queensland Rail	Following station
Colton towards Brisbane	North Coast line	Howard towards Cairns
Location

Torbanlea railway station is a closed railway station on the North Coast railway line in Queensland, Australia. It served the town of Torbanlea and its coal mine.

== History ==
The station was built in 1883 after coal was discovered at the small town. The station was closed in 1900 along with the mine after an explosion killed 5 people.
