= Beelbi Creek, Queensland =

Beelbi Creek
- Suburb
- Interactive map of Beelbi Creek
- Coordinates: 25.2899°S 152.6441°E
- Country: Australia
- State: Queensland
- LGA: Fraser Coast Region
- Location: 7.9 km (4.9 mi) NW of Torbanlea; 15.6 km (9.7 mi) W of Hervey Bay; 290 km (180 mi) N of Brisbane

Government
  - State electorate: Maryborough
  - Federal division: Hinkler

Area
  - Total: 26.2 km^{2} (10.1 sq mi)

Population
  - Total: 143 (2021 census)
  - Density: 5.458/km^{2} (14.14/sq mi)
- Time zone: UTC+10:00 (AEST)
- Postcode: 4659
Suburbs around Beelbi Creek
Burrum River	Burrum Heads	Toogoom
Burrum River	Beelbi Creek	Takura
Burgowan	Burgowan	Burgowan

Beelbi Creek is a rural locality in the Fraser Coast Region, Queensland, Australia. In the 2021 census, Beelbi Creek had a population of 143 people.

== Geography ==
Beelbi Creek (the watercourse) flows through the locality from south to north.

== Demographics ==
In the 2016 census, Beelbi Creek had a population of 142 people.

In the 2021 census, Beelbi Creek had a population of 143 people.

== Education ==
There are no schools in Beelbi Creek. The nearest government primary school is Torbanlea State School in Torbanlea to the south. The nearest government secondary school is Hervey Bay State High School in Pialba to the east.
