= Walker's Point =

Walker's Point or Walkers Point may refer to:

== Australia ==
- Walkers Point, Queensland, a locality in the Fraser Coast Region
- Walkers Point, Queensland (Bundaberg Region), a town in Woodgate in the Bundaberg Region

== United States ==
- Walker's Point, a neighborhood in Milwaukee, Wisconsin
- Walker's Point Estate, the Bush compound at Walker's Point in Kennebunkport, Maine
- Walker's Point Historic District, a historic district in Milwaukee, Wisconsin
- Walker's Point Recreation Area, near Madison, South Dakota
