= Burgowan, Queensland =

Burgowan
- Suburb
- Interactive map of Burgowan
- Coordinates: 25.3497°S 152.6511°E
- Country: Australia
- State: Queensland
- LGA: Fraser Coast Region
- Location: 26.4 km (16.4 mi) WSW of Pialba (Hervey Bay); 29.0 km (18.0 mi) NNW of Maryborough; 275 km (171 mi) N of Brisbane

Government
  - State electorate: Maryborough
  - Federal division: Hinkler

Area
  - Total: 95.1 km^{2} (36.7 sq mi)

Population
  - Total: 56 (2021 census)
  - Density: 0.589/km^{2} (1.525/sq mi)
- Time zone: UTC+10:00 (AEST)
- Postcode: 4659
Suburbs around Burgowan
Burrum River	Beelbi Creek	Takura
Torbanlea	Burgowan	Walligan
Duckinwilla	Duckinwilla	Walliebum

Burgowan is a rural locality in the Fraser Coast Region, Queensland, Australia. In the 2021 census, Burgowan had a population of 56 people.

== Geography ==
The North Coast railway line enters the locality from the south-east (Walliebum), runs close and parallel to the locality's south-western boundary, and then exits to the west (Torbanlea). The locality is served by Colton railway station in the southernmost part of the locality (25.4252°S 152.6513°E).

== History ==
The Burgowan Wastewater Treatment Plant opened in 2006.

== Demographics ==
In the 2016 census, Burgowan had a population of 45 people.

In the 2021 census, Burgowan had a population of 56 people.

== Education ==
There are no schools in Burgowan. The nearest government primary schools are Torbanlea State School in neighbouring Torbanlea to the west and Yarrilee State School in Urraween to the north-east. The nearest government secondary school is Hervey Bay State High School in Pialba.

== Facilities ==
Burgowan Wastewater Treatment Plant is a sewage treatment plant at end of Burgowan Treatment Plant Road in the north of the locality (25.3258°S 152.6596°E). It can treat 30 megalitres (1.1×10^{6} cu ft) each day.
