= Prawle, Queensland =

Prawle
- Suburb
- Interactive map of Prawle
- Coordinates: 25.49°S 152.7733°E
- Country: Australia
- State: Queensland
- LGA: Fraser Coast Region
- Location: 9.3 km (5.8 mi) E of St Helens; 15.6 km (9.7 mi) NE of Maryborough; 26.7 km (16.6 mi) S of Hervey Bay; 269 km (167 mi) N of Brisbane

Government
  - State electorate: Maryborough
  - Federal division: Wide Bay

Area
  - Total: 15.1 km^{2} (5.8 sq mi)

Population
  - Total: 34 (2021 census)
  - Density: 2.25/km^{2} (5.83/sq mi)
- Time zone: UTC+10:00 (AEST)
- Postcode: 4650
Suburbs around Prawle
Dundathu	Walliebum	Tandora
Walkers Point	Prawle	Beaver Rock
Walkers Point	Beaver Rock	Beaver Rock

Prawle is a rural locality in the Fraser Coast Region, Queensland, Australia. In the 2021 census, Prawle had a population of 34 people.

== Geography ==
The Mary River forms the southern boundary and much of the eastern and western.

The land use is mostly grazing on native vegetation with some crop growing in areas closer to the river.

== History ==
Prawle was a farm operated by William Henry White established circa 1861. The name Prawle refers to the White's place of birth in Devon, England.

== Demographics ==
In the 2016 census, Prawle had a population of 32 people.

In the 2021 census, Prawle had a population of 34 people.

== Education ==
There are no schools in Prawle. The nearest government primary school is St Helens State School in St Helens to the west. The nearest government secondary school is Aldridge State High School in Maryborough to the south-west. There are also non-government schools in Maryborough.
