= Colton railway station =

Former railway station in Queensland, Australia

Colton

General information
- Location: Colton Road, Walliebum, Queensland
- Coordinates: 25°25′37″S 152°39′08″E
- Line: North Coast Line
- Connections: no connections

Services
Preceding station	Queensland Rail	Following station
Maryborough West towards Brisbane	North Coast line	Torbanlea towards Cairns
Station is 264.66 km (164.45 mi) from Central
Location

Colton railway station is a railway station on the North Coast railway line in Queensland. It was the junction for the (now closed) Urangan railway line that extended from Colton to Takura, Stockyard Creek, Walligan, Nikenbah, Urraween, Kawungan, Pialba, Scarness, Torquay and finally Urangan and the Urangan Pier in Hervey Bay. Much of the Urangan line has now been removed, as has Colton station itself. It remains a railway siding.

== See also ==
- Hervey Bay railway line
