= Walliebum, Queensland =

Walliebum
- Suburb
- Interactive map of Walliebum
- Coordinates: 25.4233°S 152.7177°E
- Country: Australia
- State: Queensland
- LGA: Fraser Coast Region
- Location: 20.1 km (12.5 mi) N of Maryborough; 32.3 km (20.1 mi) SSW of Hervey Bay; 282 km (175 mi) N of Brisbane

Government
  - State electorate: Maryborough
  - Federal division: Wide Bay

Area
  - Total: 80.0 km^{2} (30.9 sq mi)

Population
  - Total: 0 (2021 census)
  - Density: 0.000/km^{2} (0.000/sq mi)
- Time zone: UTC+10:00 (AEST)
- Postcode: 4655
Suburbs around Walliebum
| Burgowan | Burgowan | Walligan |
| Duckinwilla | Walliebum | Susan River |
| Aldershot | Dundathu; Prawle | Tandora |

Walliebum is a rural locality in the Fraser Coast Region, Queensland, Australia. In the 2021 census, Walliebum had "no people or a very low population".

== Geography ==
Maryborough–Hervey Bay Road (State Route 57) enters the locality from the south (Dundathu) and exits to the east (Susan River).

The land use is predominantly grazing on native vegetation.

== Demographics ==
In the 2021 census, Walliebum had "no people or a very low population".

== Education ==
There are no schools in Walliebum. The nearest government primary schools are St Helens State School in St Helens to the south and Torbanlea State School in Torbanlea to the north-west. The nearest government secondary school is Aldridge State High School in Maryborough to the south. There are also non-government schools in Maryborough and its suburbs.
