= Beaver Rock, Queensland =

Beaver Rock
- Suburb
- Interactive map of Beaver Rock
- Coordinates: 25.5080°S 152.8261°E
- Country: Australia
- State: Queensland
- LGA: Fraser Coast Region
- Location: 10.0 km (6.2 mi) E of Granville; 12.5 km (7.8 mi) ENE of Maryborough; 43.5 km (27.0 mi) S of Hervey Bay; 272 km (169 mi) N of Brisbane

Government
  - State electorate: Maryborough
  - Federal division: Wide Bay

Area
  - Total: 53.0 km^{2} (20.5 sq mi)

Population
  - Total: 56 (2021 census)
  - Density: 1.057/km^{2} (2.737/sq mi)
- Time zone: UTC+10:00 (AEST)
- Postcode: 4650
Suburbs around Beaver Rock
| Prawle | Tandora | Great Sandy Strait |
| Walkers Point | Beaver Rock | The Dimonds |
| Boonooroo Plains | Boonooroo Plains | The Dimonds |

Beaver Rock is a rural locality in the Fraser Coast Region, Queensland, Australia. In the 2021 census, Beaver Rock had a population of 56 people.

== Geography ==
The Mary River forms the northern boundary, including two reaches of the river (from west to east):

- Leslie Reach (25.5086°S 152.7644°E)
- Heath Reach (25.5011°S 152.7941°E)

The river mouth into the Great Sandy Strait is at the north-east of the locality.

Along the riverside is Upper Rocky Point (25.5084°S 152.7819°E).

There are a number of named features within the river. Beaver Rock is a rock in the Mary River (25.49528°S 152.85083°E) and presumably the origin of the locality's name. Brothers Islands is an island group (25.4955°S 152.8005°E). It has one named feature, Fison Point (25.4983°S 152.8038°E) Middle Bank is a bar (25.5°S 152.8333°E).

The land use is a mix of rural residential housing, mostly in the west of the locality, with the remainder being farmland, consisting of growing sugarcane and grazing on native vegetation.

== History ==
In May 2012, a 3.5-metre (11 ft) saltwater crocodile was found in the Mary River between Brothers Island and the mainland, significantly further south than the normal range for such a crocodile. As per Queensland Government policy, crocodiles spotted south of the Boyne River are trapped and relocated to their natural habitat by wildlife official. However, the crocodile eluded the trap for many months, with wildlife officials reporting confirmed sightings of a second smaller crocodile in the river in July 2013. The smaller female crocodile was trapped in November 2013. In November 2014, the larger male crocodile was harpooned approximately 30 kilometres (19 mi) up the river at Grahams Creek to be relocated to Koorana crocodile farm at Rockhampton.

== Demographics ==
In the 2016 census, Beaver Rock had a population of 49 people.

In the 2021 census, Beaver Rock had a population of 56 people.

== Education ==
There are no schools in Beaver Rock. The nearest government primary school is Granville State School in Granville to the west. The nearest government secondary school is Maryborough State High School in Maryborough, also to the west. There are also a number of non-government schools in Maryborough and its suburbs.

== Amenities ==
There is a boat ramp on Beaver Rock Road on the south bank of the Mary River (25.5014°S 152.8357°E). It is managed by the Fraser Coast Regional Council.
