= Granville Bridge, Maryborough =

Granville Bridge
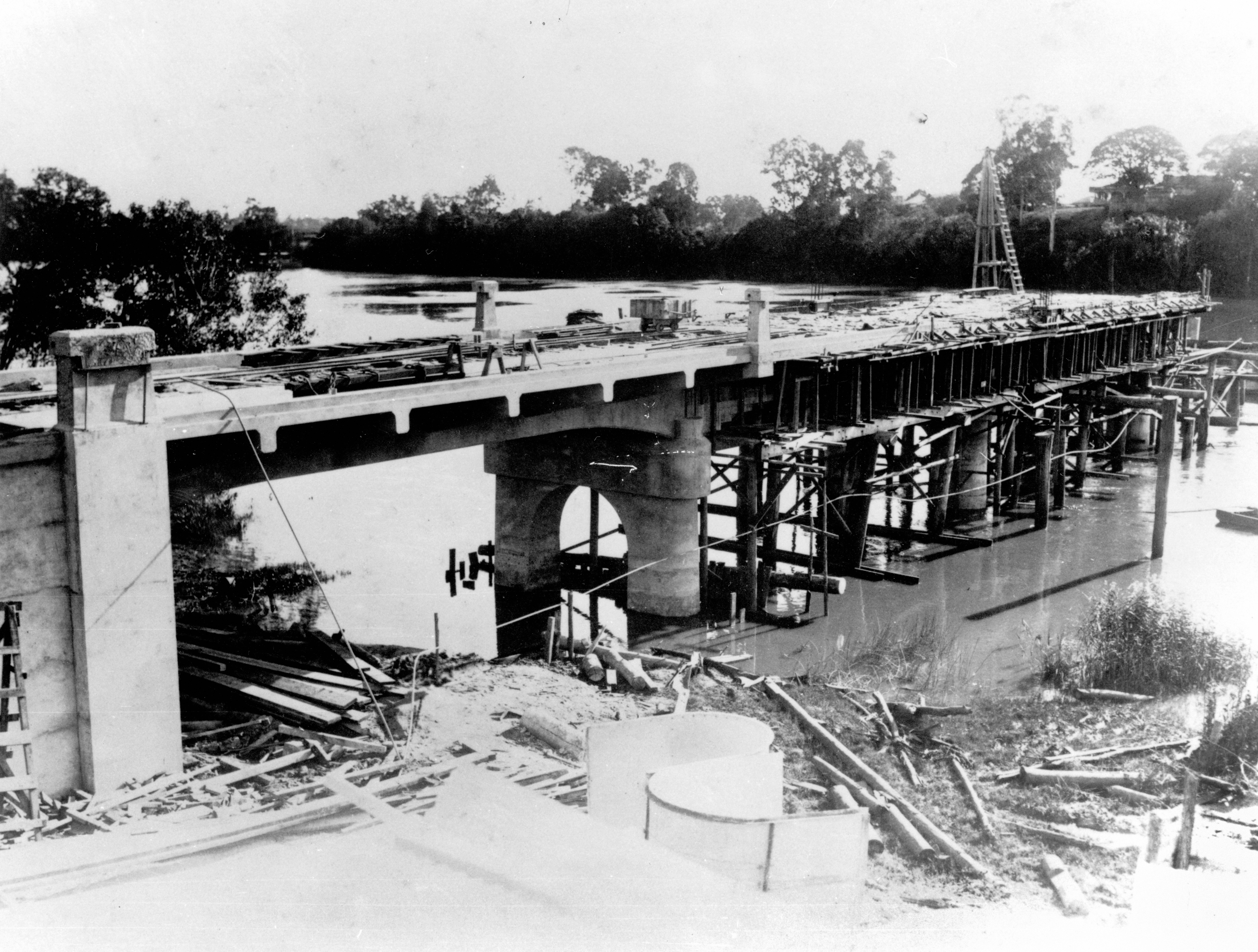
- Granville Bridge under construction, circa 1926
- Coordinates: 25°32′37″S 152°42′50″E
- Carries: Motor vehicles
- Crosses: Mary River
- Locale: Maryborough, Queensland, Australia
- Maintained by: Department of Main Roads

Characteristics
- Material: Reinforced concrete

History
- Construction end: 1926

Location
- Interactive map of Granville Bridge

The Granville Bridge is a road bridge over the Mary River at Maryborough, Queensland, Australia.

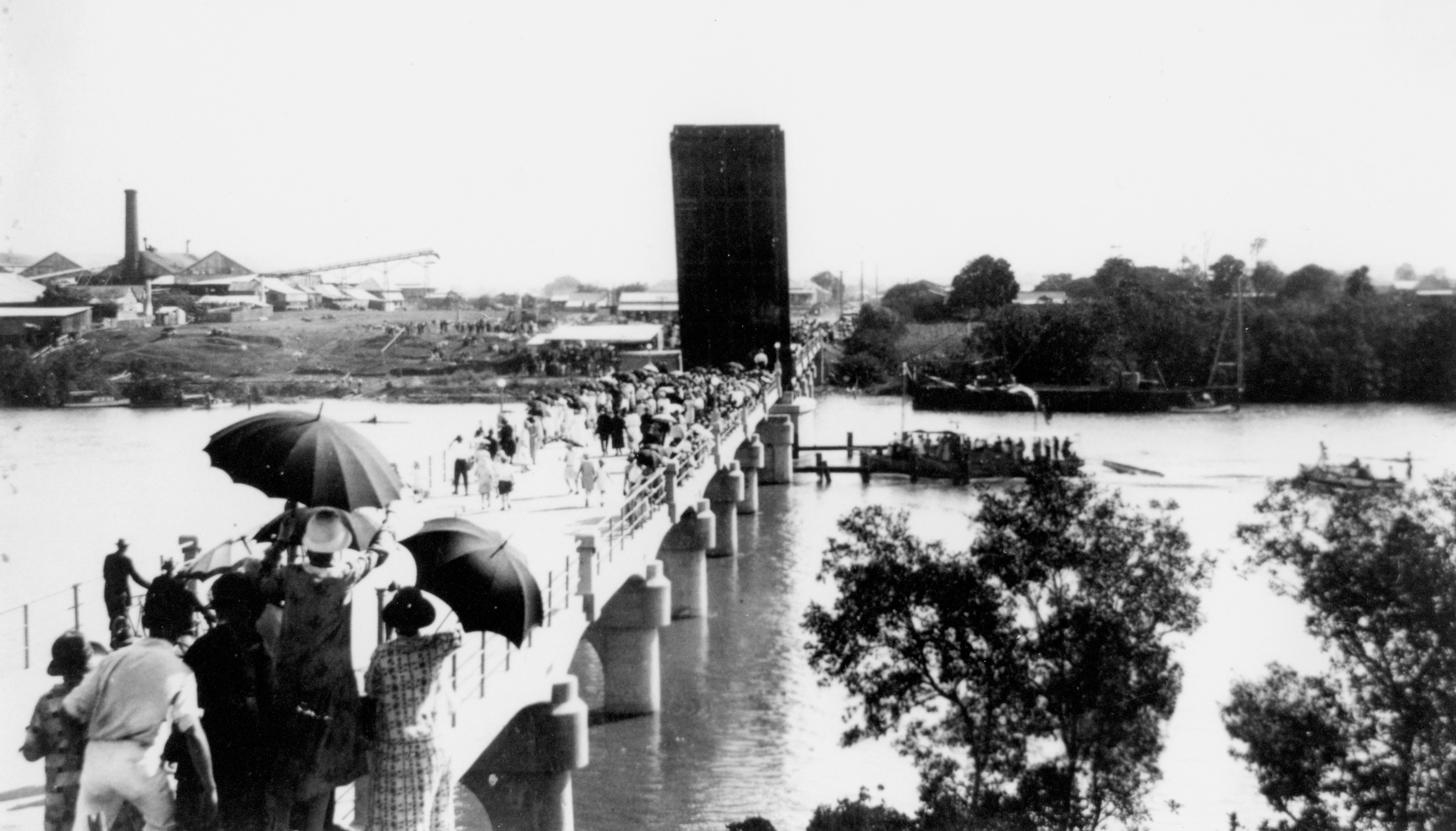
Opening of the Granville Bridge, 11 December 1926

The bridge, opened to traffic in 1926, was a second bridge in Maryborough. It was named after a suburb of Granville located on the eastern bank of the Mary River. It is the only river crossing providing access between the town centre and Granville, and other places such as Poona, Maaroom and Boonooroo.

The bridge is a low level bridge designed for inundation, which was thought to be less likely to be damaged by floating debris during floods. Due to its construction it is often prone to flooding. During the 2022 major floods, the bridge was closed for a number of days.

Most recently it was closed for about 12 hours during the March 2025 flood when the approach, but not the bridge itself, was inundated.

Since the 1992 floods, when Granville was cut off twice, local residents have been petitioning Council to build a new high level bridge.
