= Maaroom, Queensland =

Maaroom
- Suburb
- Interactive map of Maaroom
- Coordinates: 25.5941°S 152.8733°E
- Country: Australia
- State: Queensland
- LGA: Fraser Coast Region
- Location: 23 km (14 mi) SE of Maryborough; 52 km (32 mi) S of Hervey Bay; 249 km (155 mi) N of Brisbane

Government
  - State electorate: Maryborough
  - Federal division: Wide Bay

Area
  - Total: 14.1 km^{2} (5.4 sq mi)

Population
  - Total: 247 (2021 census)
  - Density: 17.52/km^{2} (45.37/sq mi)
- Time zone: UTC+10:00 (AEST)
- Postcode: 4650
Suburbs around Maaroom
Boonooroo Plains	The Dimonds	Great Sandy Strait
Boonooroo Plains	Maaroom	Great Sandy Strait
Boonooroo Plains	Great Sandy Strait	Great Sandy Strait

Maaroom is coastal rural locality in the Fraser Coast Region, Queensland, Australia. In the 2021 census, Maaroom had a population of 247 people.

== Demographics ==
In the 2016 census, Maaroom had a population of 219 people.

In the 2021 census, Maaroom had a population of 247 people.

== Education ==
There are no schools in Maaroom. The nearest government primary school is Granville State School in Granville to the west. The nearest government secondary schools in Maryborough State High School in Maryborough to the west.
