= Boonooroo Plains, Queensland =

Boonooroo Plains
- Suburb
- Interactive map of Boonooroo Plains
- Coordinates: 25.5830°S 152.815°E
- Country: Australia
- State: Queensland
- LGA: Fraser Coast Region
- Location: 11.8 km (7.3 mi) SE of Maryborough; 42.8 km (26.6 mi) S of Hervey Bay; 251 km (156 mi) N of Brisbane

Government
  - State electorate: Maryborough
  - Federal division: Wide Bay

Area
  - Total: 74.9 km^{2} (28.9 sq mi)

Population
  - Total: 0 (2021 census)
  - Density: 0.000/km^{2} (0.000/sq mi)
- Time zone: UTC+10:00 (AEST)
- Postcode: 4650
Suburbs around Boonooroo Plains
Granville; Walkers Point	Beaver Rock	The Dimonds
Bidwill; Tuan Forest	Boonooroo Plains	Maaroom
Tuan Forest	Tuan Forest	Boonooroo

Boonooroo Plains is a rural locality in the Fraser Coast Region, Queensland, Australia. In the 2021 census, Boonooroo Plains had "no people or a very low population".

== Geography ==
Most of the centre and south of the locality is within Poona National Park. It consists of low-lying coast plains with a variety of shorebirds including the threatened eastern curlew (Numenius madagascariensis) and endangered little tern.

== History ==
Poona National Park was gazetted in 1994.

== Demographics ==
In the 2016 census, Boonooroo Plains had "no people or a very low population".

In the 2021 census, Boonooroo Plains had "no people or a very low population".

== Education ==
There are no schools in Boonooroo Plains. The nearest government primary school is Granville State School in neighbouring Granville to the north-west. The nearest government secondary school is Maryborough State High School in Maryborough to the north-west.

== Facilities ==
Boonooroo transfer station is a waste disposal centre at 190 Boonooroo Road (25.6495°S 152.8568°E). It is operated by the Fraser Coast Regional Council.

== Attractions ==
The Poona National Park consists of low-lying coastal plains with a variety of shorebirds including the threatened eastern curlew and endangered little tern.
