= Dundathu, Queensland =

Dundathu
- Suburb
- Interactive map of Dundathu
- Coordinates: 25.4622°S 152.7386°E
- Country: Australia
- State: Queensland
- LGA: Fraser Coast Region
- Location: 10.0 km (6.2 mi) NNE of Maryborough; 21.1 km (13.1 mi) SSW of Hervey Bay; 274 km (170 mi) N of Brisbane

Government
  - State electorate: Maryborough
  - Federal division: Wide Bay

Area
  - Total: 10.3 km^{2} (4.0 sq mi)

Population
  - Total: 238 (2021 census)
  - Density: 23.11/km^{2} (59.8/sq mi)
- Time zone: UTC+10:00 (AEST)
- Postcode: 4650
Suburbs around Dundathu
Walliebum	Walliebum	Walliebum
Aldershot	Dundathu	Prawle
St Helens	Walkers Point	Prawle

Dundathu is a rural locality in the Fraser Coast Region, Queensland, Australia. In the 2021 census, Dundathu had a population of 238 people.

== Geography ==
The Mary River forms part of the southern boundary. Saltwater Creek forms a large part of the southern boundary as it flows east to join the Mary.

Maryborough–Hervey Bay Road (State Route 57) runs through from south to north.

== History ==
William Pettigrew explored along the Mary River in search of timber. He landed at the place he named Dundathu on 29 October 1862. Pettigrew established a sawmill which was operating by October 1863. William Sim was a partner in the Dundathu mill, having previously worked in another of Pettigrew's sawmills. On 25 December 1893, the sawmill was destroyed by fire and it was not insured. The mill was not rebuilt and people moved away. Another fire in August 1895 destroyed a number of empty houses, with Dundathu settlement described as "ashes and desolation" from which it did not recover.

On Sunday 21 January 1866, a church was opened in Dundathu provided by Pettigrew and Sims. It was 32 by 18 feet (9.8 by 5.5 m) with a spire rising to 30 feet (9.1 m) with opening for a bell and a clock. The church was to be used as a school during the week and a separate teacher's residence was built. Although initially operating as a non-vested non-denominational school, with the abolition of the non-vested school system in 1880, it became under the control of the Queensland Government as Dundathu Provisional/State School. It closed in May 1895, after the teacher was withdrawn due to low student numbers caused by the closure of the sawmill.

In 1878, a traveller along the Mary River described Dundathu as follows:

"The next break in the peaceful monotony of the placid river is Dundathu, a timbering establishment consisting of a sawmill, store, school, and about thirty cottages, all nestling in a green hollow among picturesque conglomerate rocks, and commanded by the handsome villa residence of the Sim family."

== Demographics ==
In the 2016 census, Dundathu had a population of 252 people.

In the 2021 census, Dundathu had a population of 238 people.

== Education ==
There are no schools in Dundathu. The nearest government primary school is St Helens State School in neighbouring St Helens to the south-west. The nearest government secondary schools is Aldridge State High School in Maryborough to the south-west.

== Amenities ==
Duriseer Park is a 2.9 hectares (7.2 acres) recreational area on the Maryborough - Hervey Bay Road (25.4631°S 152.7334°E). It has playground and picnic/BBQ facilities.

== Heritage Listings ==
There are two historic sites in Dundathu that are on the Fraser Coast Local Heritage Register: the Dundathu Training Wall in the Mary River and the Dundathu Cemetery on Prawle Road.
