= Tandora, Queensland =

Tandora
- Suburb
- Interactive map of Tandora
- Coordinates: 25.4538°S 152.8247°E
- Country: Australia
- State: Queensland
- LGA: Fraser Coast Region
- Location: 21.6 km (13.4 mi) NW of Maryborough; 32.7 km (20.3 mi) SSE of Hervey Bay; 275 km (171 mi) N of Brisbane

Government
  - State electorate: Maryborough
  - Federal division: Wide Bay

Area
  - Total: 61.9 km^{2} (23.9 sq mi)

Population
  - Total: 0 (2021 census)
  - Density: 0.000/km^{2} (0.000/sq mi)
- Time zone: UTC+10:00 (AEST)
- Postcode: 4650
Suburbs around Tandora
Susan River	Susan River	Susan River
Walliebum	Tandora	Great Sandy Strait
Prawle	Beaver Rock	Beaver Rock

Tandora is a rural locality in the Fraser Coast Region, Queensland, Australia. In the 2021 census, Tandora had "no people or a very low population".

== Geography ==
The Mary River forms the south-eastern boundary and much of the southern boundary. The Susan River forms two small sections of the northern boundary.

Tandora Road enters from the west (Walliebum) and proceeds east through the locality, terminating in the east of the locality.

There are some areas for nature conservation in the north and north-east of the locality, but apart from these, the land use is grazing on native vegetation.

== Demographics ==
In the 2016 census, Tandora had a population of 11 people.

In the 2021 census, Tandora had "no people or a very low population".

== Education ==
There are no schools in Tandora. The nearest government primary school is St Helens State School in St Helens to the south-west. The nearest government secondary school is Aldridge State High School in Maryborough to the south-west. There are a number of non-government schools in Maryborough and its suburbs.
