= Hervey Bay (Urangan) railway line =

Former railway line in Queensland, Australia

Coordinates: 25°17′12.93″S 152°53′57.48″E

Hervey Bay railway line
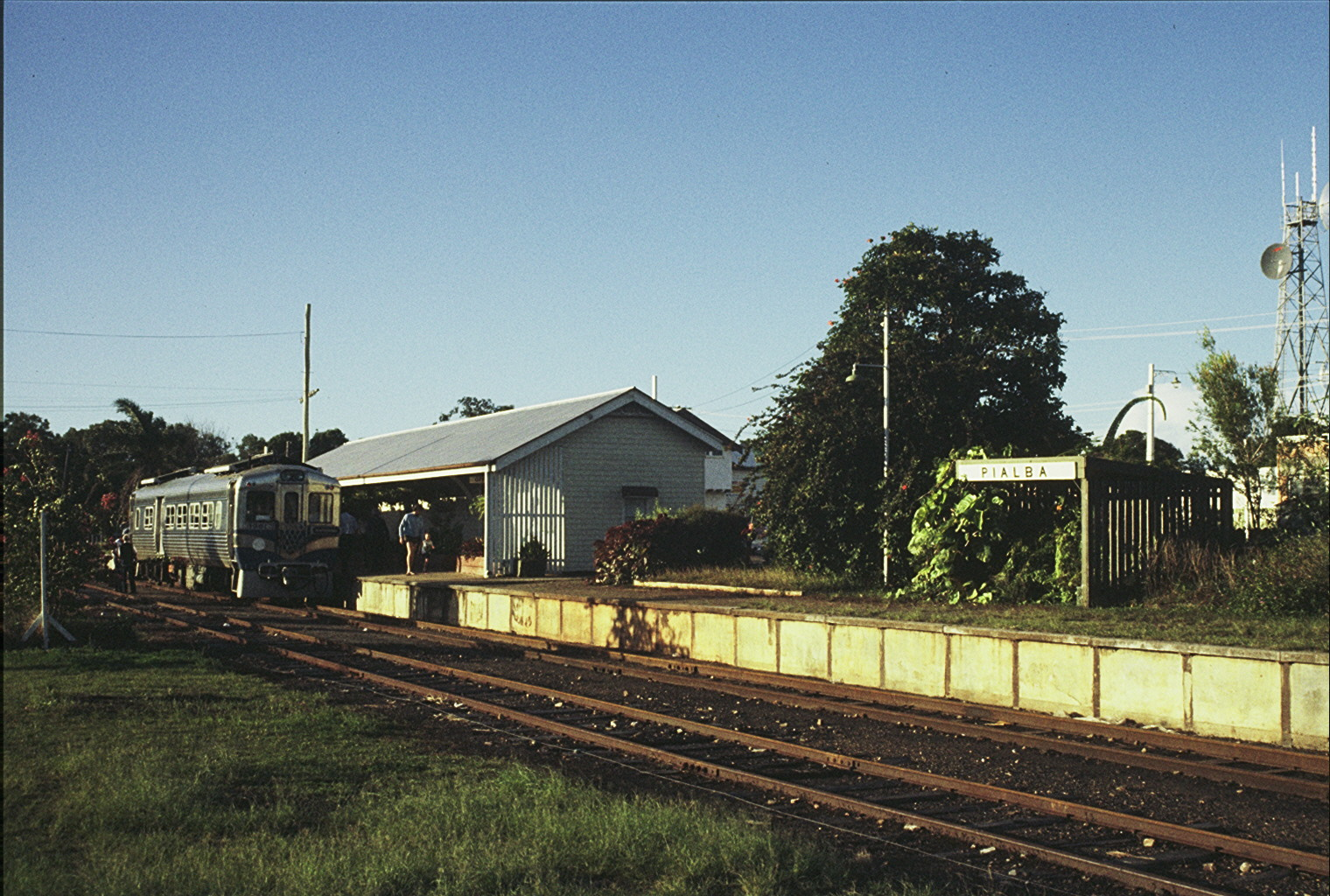
- Railmotor 1901 at Pialba Station circa 1989

Overview
- Status: Closed, partly converted to rail trail
- Owner: QR Limited
- Termini: Colton; Urangan
- Stations: 10

History
- Closed: 10 June 1993

Technical
- Track gauge: 3 ft 6 in (1,067 mm) narrow gauge
Route map
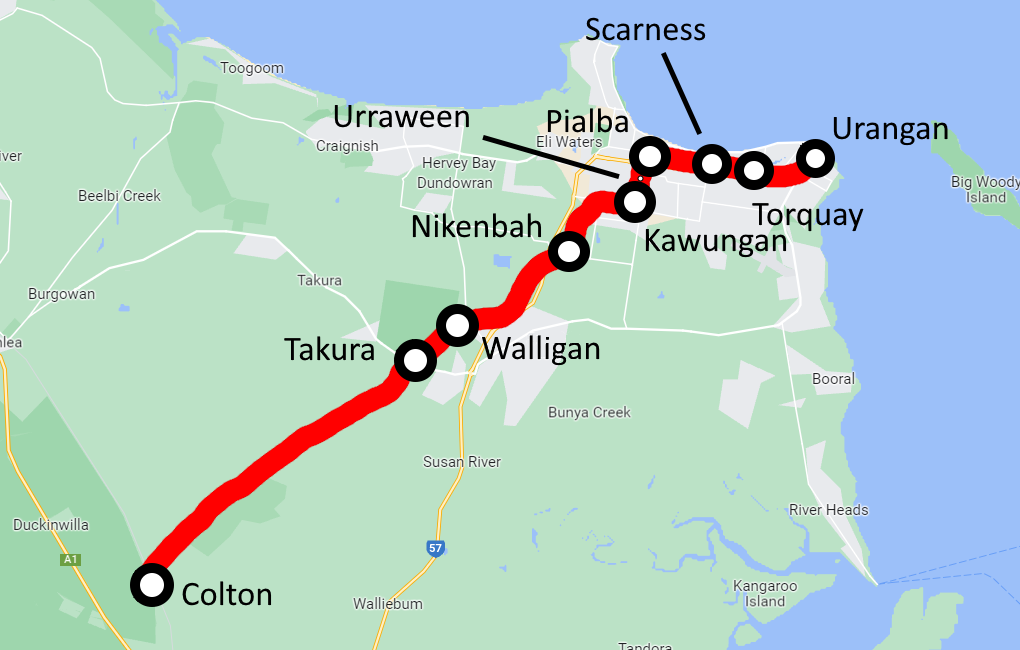

Hervey Bay railway line, sometimes known as Urangan railway line, is a closed railway line in Queensland, Australia. It was opened in 1896 to Pialba and it was extended to Urangan in 1913. It was extended to the end of the Urangan Pier in 1917, along with the opening of the pier. It was closed in 1993.

== History ==
The line has a long and storied history.

=== Before proposals ===
Coal was discovered on the Burrum River in 1863. The Maryborough railway line had commenced operations as an isolated system with the opening of a line from the Port of Maryborough to the goldfields at Gympie. Initially, the coal at Burrum River generated little interest, but by the 1880s, developers were pushing for a railway to the river, and the first section of the line, which would eventually be extended to Bundaberg, opened from Baddow to Howard on 30 June 1883. This gave the coal mines near Howard access to the Maryborough wharves, but the small, shallow vessels which could traverse the Mary River were not conductive to development, and shipping of the coal from Burrum River, across Hervey Bay to the Mary River where it was transshipped to larger vessels was met with similarly limited success.

=== Trial survey ===
In 1882–1883, a trial survey was carried out by the government with regards to a possible railway to Hervey Bay. The trial had been made from a point 11 km (6.8 mi) north of Croydon to Pialba, a distance of 27 km (17 mi). By commencing the line so far north, it would avoid major bridging of the Susan River, and the land the line would traverse would be relatively flat. The proposal by Vernon Corporation led to the government's proposal being shelved for the time being.

=== Early proposals ===
In 1883, capitalists from the state of Victoria visited the Wide Bay area to purchase land for coal mining at Burrum, and planned to construct a railway or tramway to Hervey Bay, where they would construct coal wharves. On the bay, it would be possible to provide a deep water berth for larger ships, which was necessary for coal to be exported intrastate, interstate and overseas. Burrum coal was cited as an alternative to Newcastle coal for industry in Victoria where coal was unavailable and required importing. The capitalists formed into the Vernon Coal & Railway Company, which was incorporated in Melbourne on 25 September 1884.

As an incentive to Queensland investors to make available their local knowledge, experience and interest, the company planned to allot £50,000 to Queenslanders. Local support was not as great as expected and the whole of the capital required was subscribed by Melbourne businessmen.

=== First proposal and bill ===
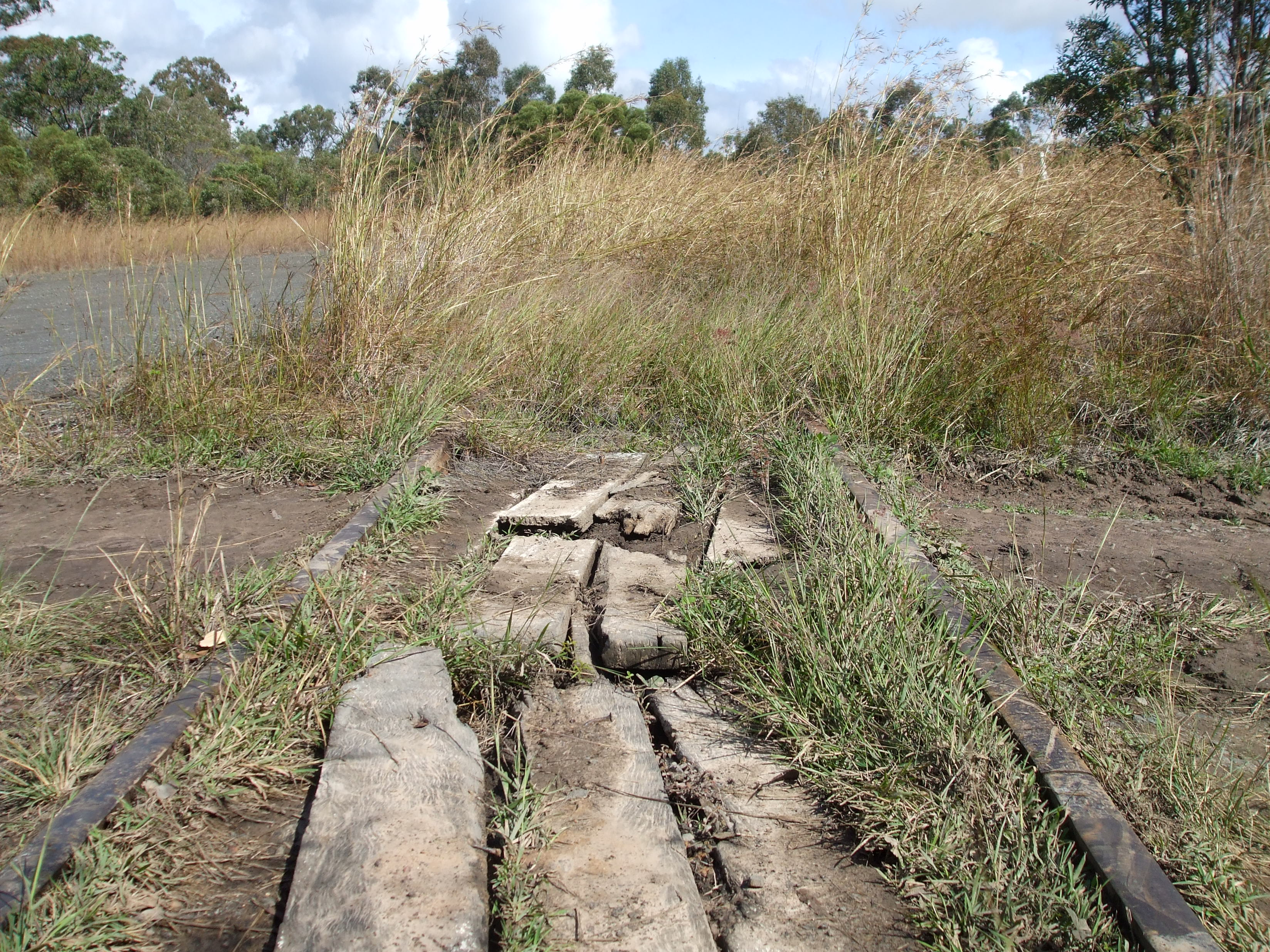
An extant level crossing at Takura station in 2010

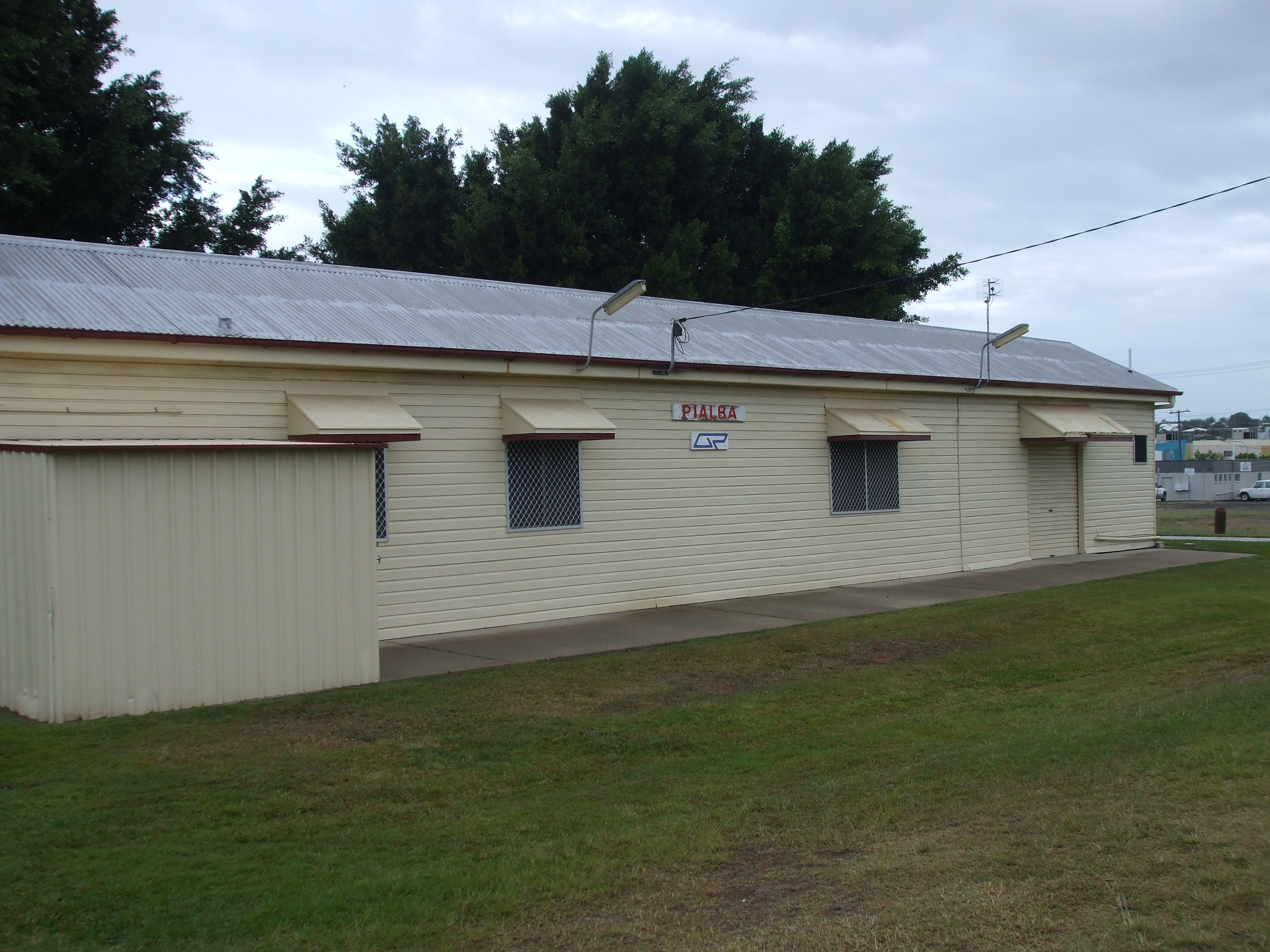
Pialba railway station in July 2010

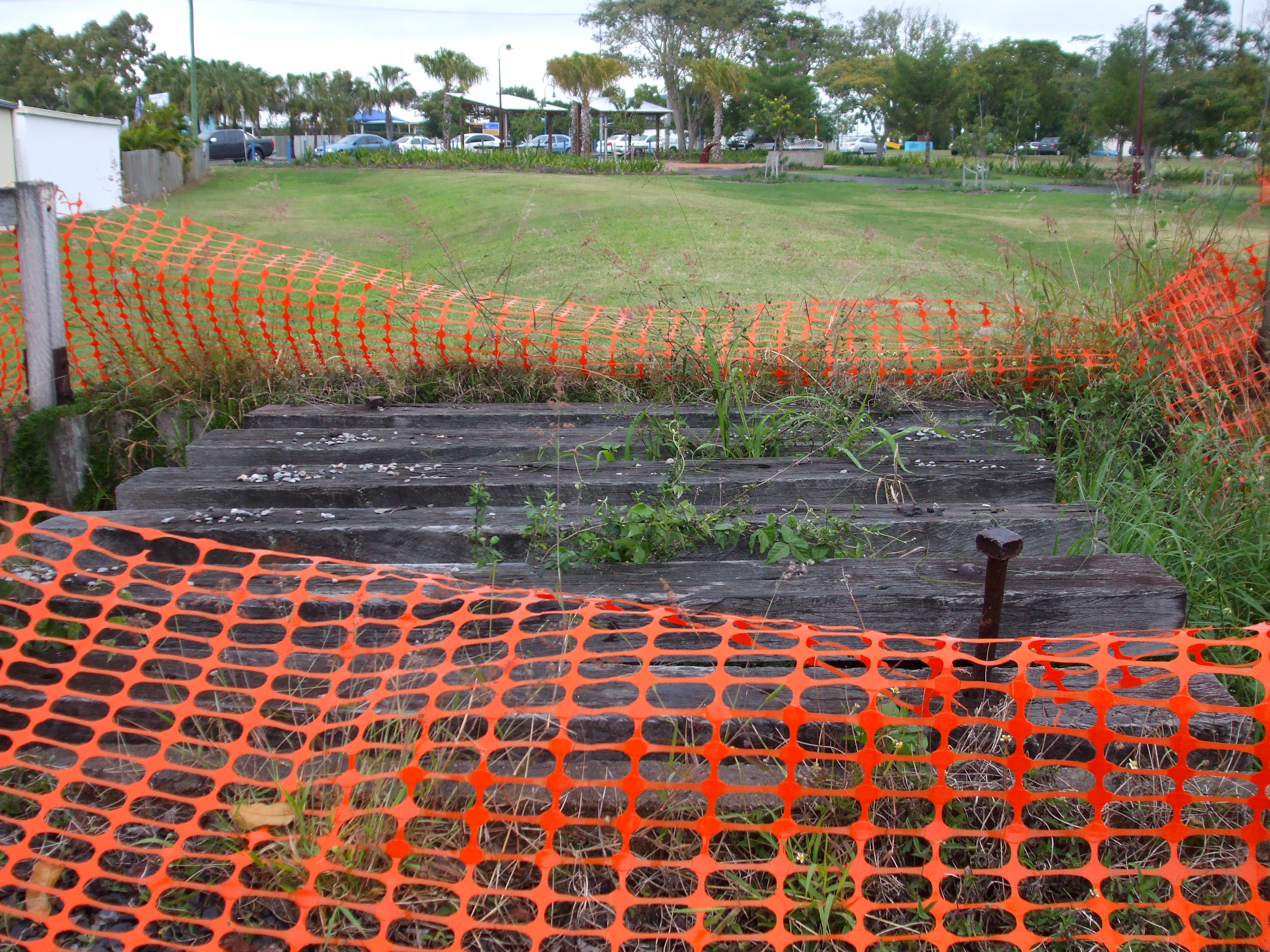
One of the few distinct railway items left in the Hervey Bay CBD

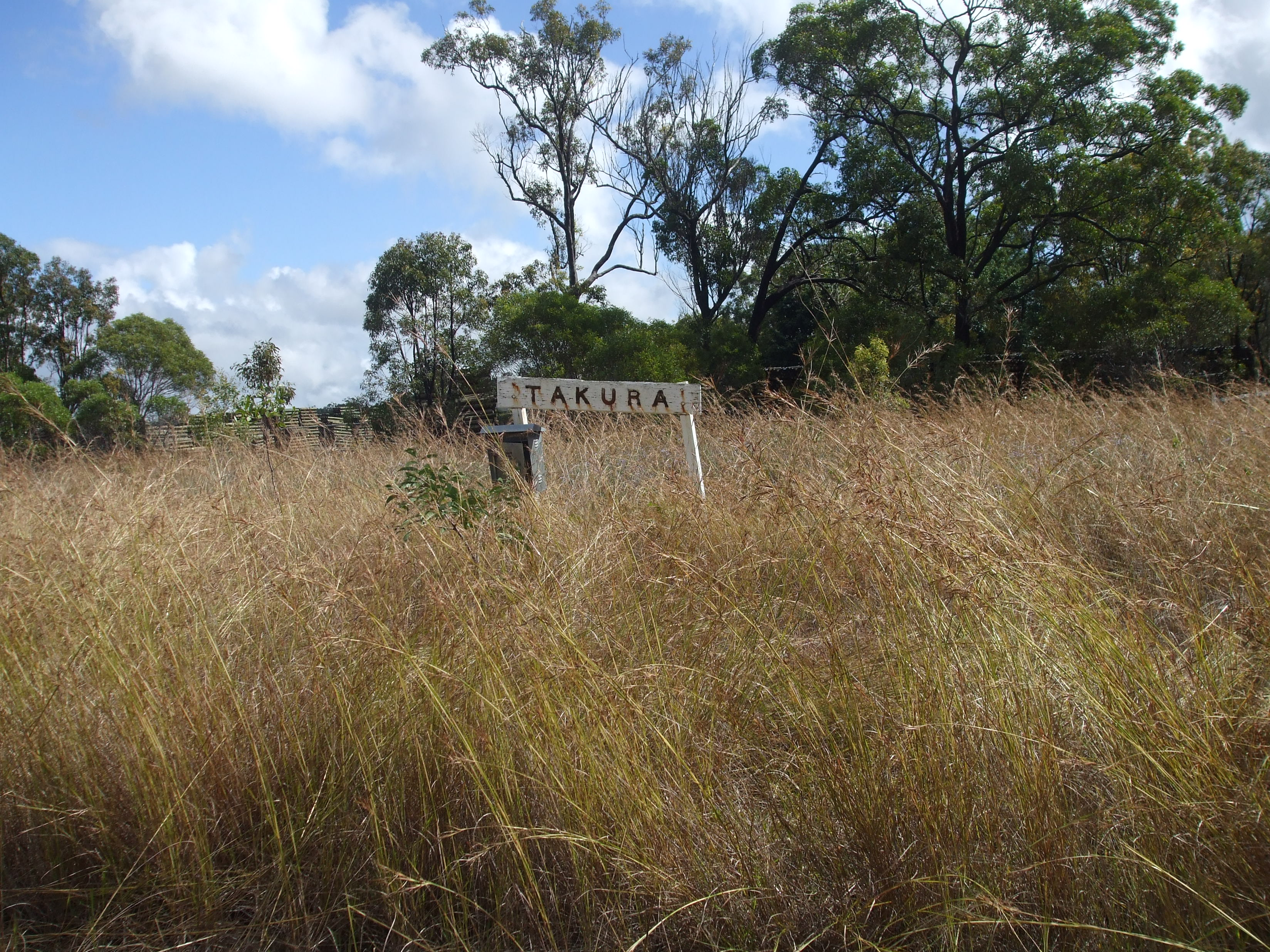
Takura is the first railway station on the line

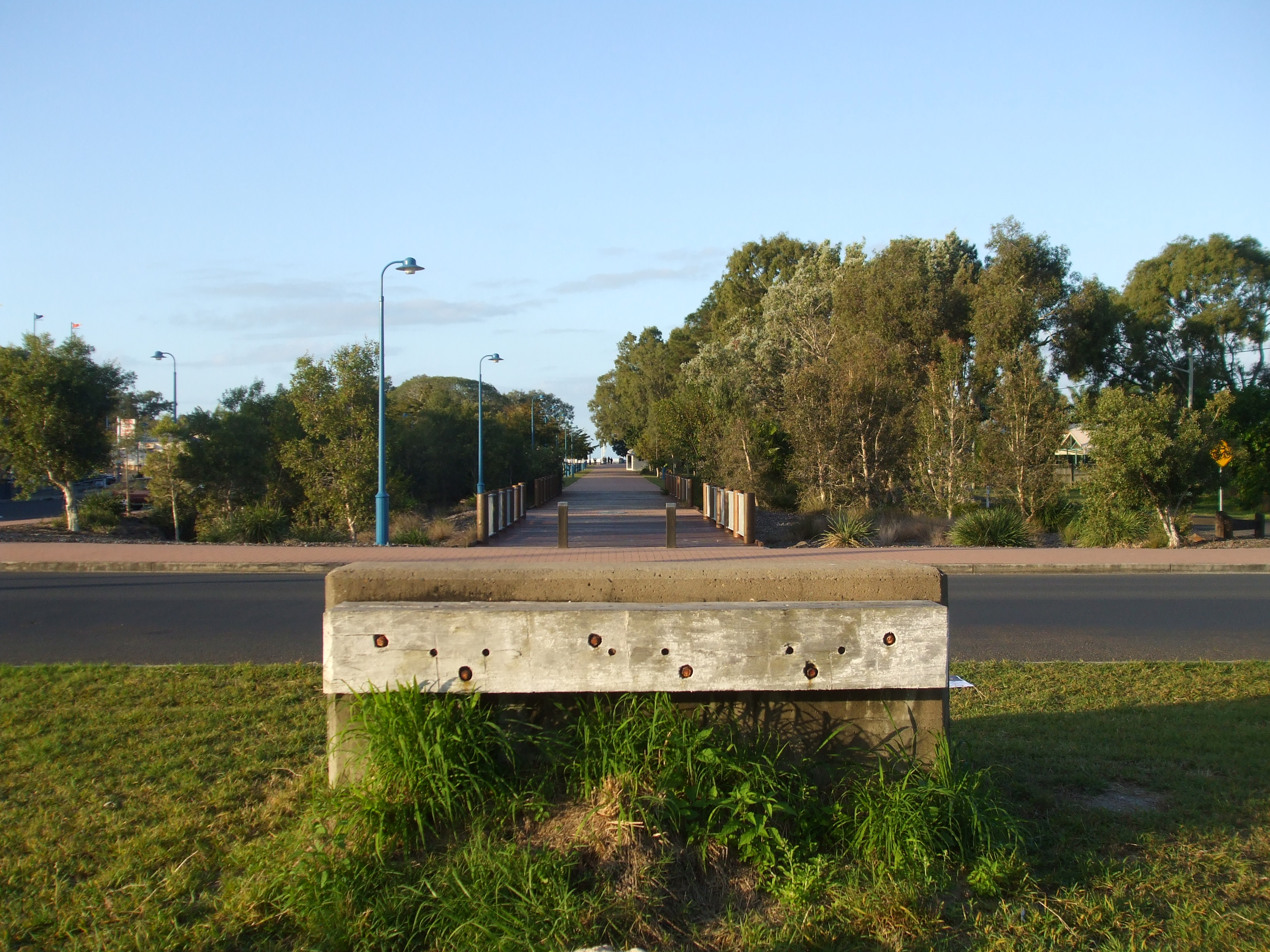
This railway stop has been left in front of the Urangan Pier.

In September 1884, the Vernon Corporation presented the Maryborough and Urangan Railway Bill to the Queensland Parliament. Included in the bill was the proposal to build a railway or tramway from Maryborough to Urangan, which the company guaranteed to build within 8 months if the bill were to be passed. It was noted that the line would benefit the district and the coal trade, as well as providing easy access to the beach resort of Pialba. Other proposals included the privilege selection of 1,000 acres of Burrum coal land at market value and the purchasing of 200 acres of frontage land on Hervey Bay for the construction of wharves.

The proposed railway was planned to commence at Kent Street in Maryborough, and would run along the main line to Baddow, causing as little inconvenience to the railway traffic to Gympie as possible. It would then utilise the first 7 and a half miles (12 km) of the Burrum railway to a point approximately the same location as Colton, then run north-east to Pialba and south to Urangan on a new formation. The coal traffic would be catered for by a loop line which would diverge from the Burrum railway line (now part of the main North Coast railway line) 12 miles (19 km) north of Baddow and join the new line somewhere near Pialba.

Stations were to be located at Kent Street (in Maryborough), Pialba (where watering facilities would be provided) and Urangan (where the main office and workshops were to be located). The rails were to be 60 lb (27 kg) per yard, and although this weight would eventually become state standard, it was heavier than the rail that was eventually used when the railway was built. The government had the option to buy the railway and wharf facilities at a cost, plus 5% of the value of rolling stock and other equipment, after ten years.

Extensive alterations were made to the bill after a select committee was set up to investigate it, and although there were no alterations to the course of the line, the committee added that the line was to be built within three years and the period after which the government had the option of purchasing it was reduced to five years, which was not well received by the Victorian promoters. Due to this, they promptly withdrew their support for the scheme.

=== Initial Issues ===
The Maryborough and Urangan Railway Bill received government approval on 5 December 1884, but by 1885 no work on construction of the railway or its associated works had been undertaken. In March 1885, some of the Vernon Co. directors visited the Burrum coalfield and were surprised to find that little development of the coal deposits had taken place, but promises were made that the railway would soon be commenced. Though the company had proven to the government that it had sufficient funds to complete the railway, doubts were now being expressed as to the company's intentions, and the government withheld deeds of 1,000 acres of land that the company had selected on the coalfield for mining purposes until the completion of the railway.

The first share issue of the company in February 1886, did not meet with the expected response and difficulties were being experienced in obtaining land leases for right of way.

=== Second bill and collapse of Vernon Co. ===
Vernon Corporation was on the verge of collapse in 1887, but interest shown by London capitalists, the Australian-based Transcontinental railway syndicate, in buying the company, gave renewed hope. This led to the presentation in September, 1887, of a further bill to parliament – the Maryborough and Urangan Railway Amendment Bill – the main issue affecting the railway construction being an extension in the time for it to be undertaken. The select committee appointed recommended that the bill be passed. Soon after, the London-based syndicate had discontinued its interest in Vernon Corporation, and as it stood was unable to raise an additional £3000 deposit and eventually went into liquidation in 1888. The project collapsed and the bill was withdrawn.

=== After the Vernon Co. liquidation ===
In 1889, a new company, the Isis Investment Corporation (which at that stage was working the Torbanlea Colliery), made approaches to the government regarding the construction of a private railway from Torbanlea to the mouth of the Burrum River on terms which were similar to those granted to Vernon Co. some years earlier. This proposal also failed to eventuate, and although interest in a railway did not wane, there seemed little likelihood of the government or a private enterprise building such a line.

In 1895, the Queensland government passed the "Railway Construction Guarantee Act", the main provision of this act being that the government and local authorities would guarantee to meed half the loss incurred of share the profits. Though there was some local opposition in such use of taxpayers' money, the Burrum Divisional Board, who were keen to see the railway built, agreed to act as the other guarantor.

=== New plans and construction ===
During 1895–1896, trial and working surveys were undertaken, and in March 1896, the plans for the new railway line were approved by the government, the first railway in Queensland to be constructed under the new guarantee act.

On 14 April 1896, the contract for the construction of the Colton-Pialba railway line, 16 miles 47 chains in length, was let to McArdle & Thompson, who had tendered for the contract with a price of £25,250. The line was to be completed by 1 March 1897.

The contractors commenced work, and with the relatively flat terrain, construction proceeded steadily. The tourist potential of the line had already been realised and there were possibilities of the coal mining industry developing, as well as an upturn in the agriculture and timber industries. Danish and German families played an important part in the development of the surrounding areas, and were principally involved in sugar-cane and timber-getting. The sugar cane flourished on the fertile land near the coast, and Boyle Martin opened a crushing mill at Pialba in 1883 to cater for cane growers. By 1887, there were three mills in the area, but after the railway opened the cane was sent further afield, and these mills closed.

Construction had advanced sufficiently enough for McArdle and Thompson to open the railway to Aalberg (sometimes spelt Aarlberg, now known as Nikenbah) in October, 1896. Using their own engines, transport of the first sugar cane to be railed from the district to the Maryborough Sugar Factory.

The railway was completed to Pialba and opened for traffic on 18 December 1896, however the official opening occurred two days later. During the first three years of operation, the line sustained a loss, but as this had decreased over the same period, it was optimistically felt that the revenue would improve as settlement expanded now that an efficient means of communication had been provided.

=== Urangan extension ===
Though the line to Pialba was now completed, a deep water port at Urangan was vitally needed. Local people pressed for the extension, but it was not until 1907 and 1910 that two trial surveys for the short distance were undertaken. Approval was finally given for the railway to be built in 1911. A working survey was undertaken in 1912, and construction commenced the following year. The line opened on 19 December 1913, with train services commencing the following day.

The government started construction of a pier at Urangan, but it was not completed until three years later, and the coal owners therefore failed to gain the export coal orders that they obviously hoped for. Due to this, the Burrum coal catered mainly for the local market – between Gympie and Bundaberg – such as railways, industry, gas works, sugar mills and coastal shipping. In the end, it was sugar, not coal, which formed the most important commodity to be handled over the pier, and it never became the coaling port which had been originally intended.

=== Post-construction ===
The sugar cane industry continued to flourish, however the coal came to a gradual end, and by 1967 mining had virtually ceased. In 1969, produce was no longer exported to Maryborough via the railway line as it became too costly to maintain. Pineapples became the main export to Maryborough. Caltex constructed an oil depot at Urangan in 1961, and soon after all exports from the Urangan pier stopped, and oil became the only import. The pier was closed to all railway traffic on 31 December 1974.

In 1985, Caltex's new oil supertankers were unable to navigate Hervey Bay, which led to the closure of the Urangan Pier. Koppers Ltd. established its large logging treatment plant at Takura Siding. Consignments in wagon loads were attached to trains on a daily bases. Burgowan Siding was established with the discovery of coal in that area. An average of six wagons of coal per day were dispatched by train.

=== Closure ===
The last passenger train to run on the branch departed Pialba on 7 August 1972, but the railway line was kept open for freight. Pialba was the main freight terminal. The last train to depart from the Urangan freight terminal did so on 29 October 1991, as Caltex stopped operations at the storage facility. The railway line was officially closed on 30 June 1993. The last train to run on the line was No.7M 44 at 10 am on 30 June 1993.

== Present day ==
The railway line from Pialba to Urangan was converted into a rail trail. From Takura to Pialba the tracks have been ripped up and from Colton to Takura the tracks lie in a state of severe disrepair. The line has been disconnected from the main North Coast railway line. Traces of the railway line still exist. The track ballast is still visible where the mobility corridor ends in Urangan. Beyond that, there are tracks embedded in Pier Street. A small railway bridge exists where the line to Urangan branched off in Pialba, opposite Pialba Place. There are plans to convert the rest of the line into a rail trail. Pialba railway station still exists, though the platform has been removed and the building has been converted to the Vietnam Veterans Association. Pialba and Takura are the only stations to retain their nameboards.

Some railway activists are calling for a modern rail link to be installed to Hervey Bay due to the city's rapid growth. People wishing to travel to Hervey Bay by rail must leave the train at Maryborough West and continue by QR's bus.

=== Location of railway buildings ===
Some of the railway station buildings on the line were preserved. The status of some of the station buildings is not known.

- Urangan railway station – Building exists on private property near Nikenbah
- Torquay railway station – Building exists as an extension to a private residence in Urangan
- Scarness railway station – Building preserved at Australiana Tourist Park, approx. 1 kilometre (0.62 mi) from the original site
- Pialba railway station – Building was turned around and refurbished after closure. Now serves Vietnam Veterans Association. Exists in original location.
- Kawungan railway station – Only had a waiting shed, unknown status.
- Urraween railway station – Only had a waiting shed, unknown status.
- Nikenbah railway station – Unknown, presumably exists on private property with Urangan railway station's building
- Walligan railway station – Only had a waiting shed, unknown status.
- Stockyard Creek siding – Did not have a building, steam filling tank removed.
- Takura railway station – Did not have a building, name board exists, had a waiting shed, unknown status

== Rollingstock used on the line ==
The A12-class 4-4-0s, B12-class 2-6-0s and the B13-class 4-6-0s provided the motive power on the line in the early days of its operation. The PB15-class 4-6-0s appeared in the 1920s, and as the older classes disappeared, they took over all steam-train haulings.

The red railmotors appeared on the branch in 1928–1929, starting with the 45 horsepower version and gravitating through the 50 horsepower diesel type to the 100–120 horsepower versions, which operated most of the railcar services throughout the 1940s. From 1961 onwards, these railcars were replaced with the 2000 class railmotors.

In 1966, Walkers Ltd. of Maryborough built a B-B diesel-hydraulic locomotive, the first of its kind, as an experiment, offering it to Queensland Railways on a trial basis. The trial took place on the Hervey Bay railway line. The locomotive was successful, and became the forerunner to the DH-class locomotive.

After the demise of the steam trains in 1966–1967, the DH class initially worked most of the locomotive-hauled trains, with the occasional appearances from 60-ton diesel-electric units which were allowed on the branch from 1966. They became the normal motive power on the branch until its closure.

== See also ==
- Rail transport in Queensland
