= Island Plantation, Queensland =

Island Plantation
- Suburb
- Interactive map of Island Plantation
- Coordinates: 25.4913°S 152.7302°E
- Country: Australia
- State: Queensland
- LGA: Fraser Coast Region
- Location: 6.2 km (3.9 mi) NW of Maryborough; 29.1 km (18.1 mi) SSW of Hervey Bay; 270 km (170 mi) N of Brisbane

Government
  - State electorate: Maryborough
  - Federal division: Wide Bay

Area
  - Total: 7.4 km^{2} (2.9 sq mi)
- Elevation: 10 m (33 ft)

Population
  - Total: 155 (2021 census)
  - Density: 20.95/km^{2} (54.2/sq mi)
- Time zone: UTC+10:00 (AEST)
- Postcode: 4650
Suburbs around Island Plantation
St Helens	St Helens	Walkers Point
St Helens	Island Plantation	Walkers Point
Maryborough	Maryborough	Walkers Point

Island Plantation is a rural locality in the Fraser Coast Region, Queensland, Australia. In the 2021 census, Island Plantation had a population of 155 people.

== Geography ==
The Mary River forms the eastern boundary of the locality.

The land is flat and low-lying.

The land use is predominantly growing sugarcane with some grazing on native vegetation.

== History ==
A Baptist Church opened at "The Island" on the weekend of 8-9 September 1906. The church was 34 by 20 feet (10.4 by 6.1 m).

Following the closure of the school in neighbouring St Helens in December 1941, in May 1942 the Island Farmer's Association offered their hall to establish a school in Island Plantation for the duration of the war. Gladys Rose Walter was transferred to the school in June 1942 as its teacher. Island Plantation Provisional School opened in 1942 and closed in 1944.

== Demographics ==
In the 2016 census, Island Plantation had a population of 146 people.

In the 2021 census, Island Plantation had a population of 155 people.

== Education ==
There are no schools in Island Plantation. The nearest government primary school is St Helens State School in neighbouring St Helens to the west. The nearest government secondary schools are Maryborough State High School and Aldridge State High School, both in Maryborough to south and south-west.
