= Maryborough Correctional Centre =

Prison in Queensland, Australia

Coordinates: 25°28′45″S 152°38′55″E

- Interactive map of Maryborough Correctional Centre
- Location: Aldershot, Queensland
- Status: Operational
- Security class: Maximum/Medium (Male)
- Capacity: 320 (High security); 180 (Residential)
- Opened: 16 April 2003
- Managed by: Department of Corrective Services

Maryborough Correctional Centre is a prison located at Stein Road, Aldershot, Queensland, Australia, approximately 8 kilometres (5.0 mi) north-west of Maryborough.

The Maryborough Correctional Centre is a multi-purpose, secure custody facility which accommodates 320 male prisoners in secure accommodation and 180 male prisoners in residential accommodation. It is also a remand and reception centre for offenders from Bundaberg to Gympie.

== See also ==
- List of Australian prisons
