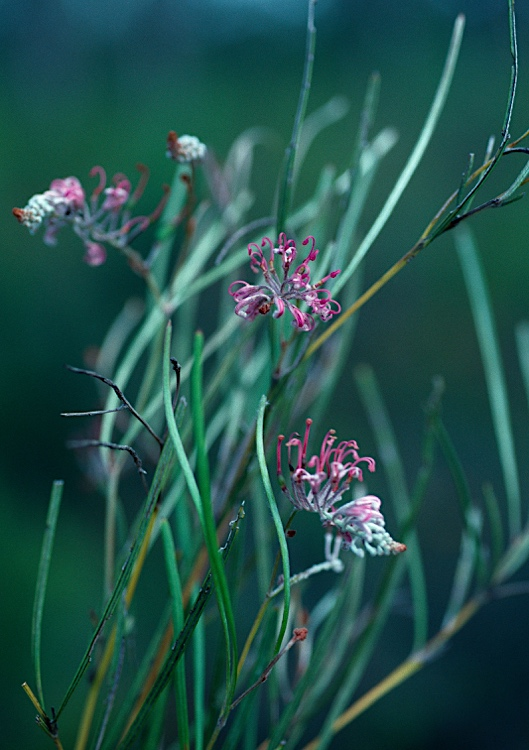
- Grevillea reptans in Poona National Park

Scientific classification
- Kingdom: Plantae
- Clade: Tracheophytes
- Clade: Angiosperms
- Clade: Eudicots
- Order: Proteales
- Family: Proteaceae
- Genus: Grevillea
- Species: G. reptans

Binomial name
- Grevillea reptans Makinson

= Grevillea reptans =

Tin Can Bay grevillea

Species of shrub endemic to Queensland, Australia

Grevillea reptans, also known as the Tin Can Bay grevillea, is a species of flowering plant in the family Proteaceae and is endemic to south-eastern Queensland. It is usually a prostrate shrub with long vine-like or arching branches, more or less linear leaves, and branched clusters of mauve-pink flowers.

== Description ==
Grevillea reptans is usually a prostrate to arching sub-shrub that typically grows to a height of up to 30 cm (12 in) and has long, pliable, vine-like or arching branches. The leaves are more or less linear, 6–12 mm (0.24–0.47 in) long and 1–2 mm (0.039–0.079 in) wide with the edges rolled under. The flowers are arranged on the ends of branches in branched clusters on a peduncle 10–40 mm (0.39–1.57 in) long, each branch of the flowering clusters with 16 to 24 flowers on one side of the flowering rachis, the youngest flowers towards the ends of the rachis. The flowers are mauve-pink and woolly- to shaggy-hairy, the style becoming red as it ages, the pistil 7–9 mm (0.28–0.35 in) long. Flowering mainly occurs from August to November, and the fruit is a follicle 7–9 mm (0.28–0.35 in) long.

== Taxonomy ==
Grevillea reptans was first formally described in 2000 by Robert Owen Makinson in the Flora of Australia from specimens collected in 1966 by Clifford Gittins, near Howard, Queensland in Queensland. The specific epithet (reptans) means "creeping" or "crawling".

== Distribution and habitat ==
Tin Can Bay grevillea grows in shrubby woodland and heathy wallum in scattered places between Burrum Heads, Tewantin and Cooloola National Park, north of Brisbane in south-eastern Queensland.

== See also ==
- List of Grevillea species
