= Aldershot, Queensland =

Aldershot
- Town
- Interactive map of Aldershot
- Coordinates: 25.4625°S 152.6610°E
- Country: Australia
- State: Queensland
- LGA: Fraser Coast Region
- Location: 11.2 km (7.0 mi) NNW of Maryborough; 39.0 km (24.2 mi) SW of Hervey Bay; 266 km (165 mi) N of Brisbane

Government
  - State electorate: Maryborough
  - Federal divisions: Hinkler; Wide Bay

Area
  - Total: 21.3 km^{2} (8.2 sq mi)

Population
  - Total: 1,311 (2021 census)
  - Density: 61.55/km^{2} (159.4/sq mi)
- Time zone: UTC+10:00 (AEST)
- Postcode: 4650
Localities around Aldershot
Duckinwilla	Walliebum	Dundathu
Dunmora	Aldershot	St Helens
Oakhurst	Maryborough West	Maryborough

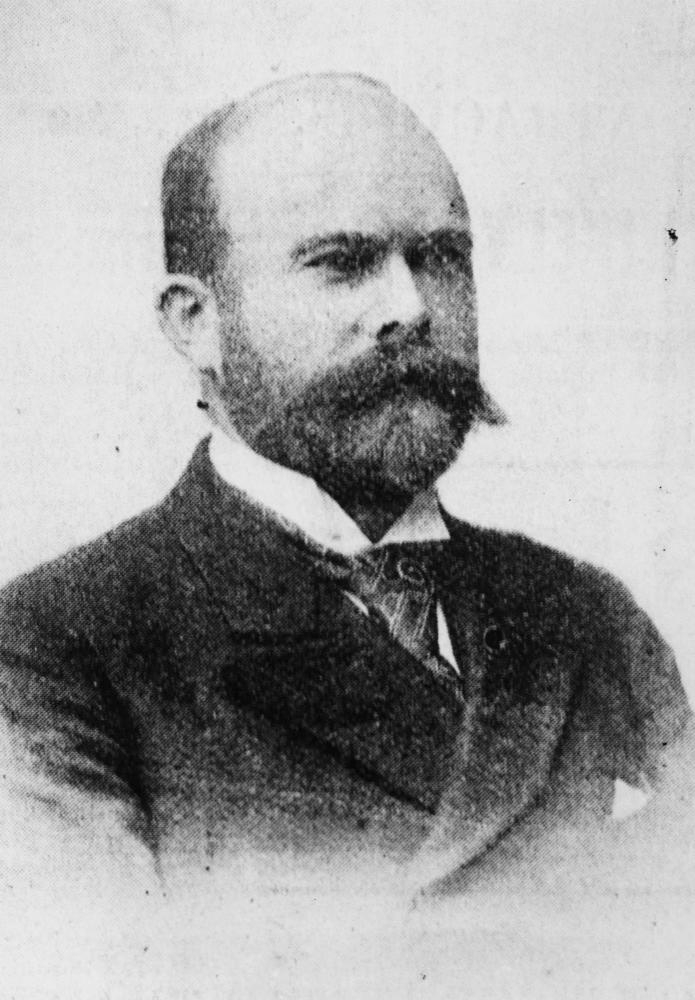
E. A. Weinberg, manager of the Aldershot works, 1895

Aldershot is a rural town and locality in the Fraser Coast Region, Queensland, Australia. In the 2021 census, the locality of Aldershot had a population of 1,311 people.

== Geography ==
The Bruce Highway passes through from south to north-west. The North Coast railway line forms part of the southern boundary and then passes through the locality and town from south to north. Aldershot railway station is an abandoned railway station on the line (25.4631°S 152.6653°E).

Saltwater Creek, a tributary of the Mary River, runs through the locality from west to east, passing south of the town.

== History ==
The Queensland Smelting Company named the town after Aldershot in England. The company was established in England in 1888 and in 1893 built a smelter in the area. The smelter operated until 1906, when it was relocated to North Queensland to be closer to the mining areas.

Aldershot Post Office opened on 1 September 1892 and closed around 1920.

Aldershot State School opened in 1894. It had closed by 1911, when tenders were called to relocate the school buildings to Maryborough West and the teacher's residence to Gayndah.

== Demographics ==
In the 2016 census, the locality of Aldershot had a population of 1,152 people.

In the 2021 census, the locality of Aldershot had a population of 1,311 people.

== Economy ==
The major industry in Aldershot today is the Maryborough Correctional Centre located at Stein Road (25.4786°S 152.6486°E).

== Education ==
There are no schools in Aldershot. The nearest government primary schools are St Helens State School in neighbouring St Helens to the east and Sunbury State School in neighbouring Maryborough to the south-east. The nearest government secondary school is Aldridge State High School, also in Maryborough.

== Facilities ==
Aldershot Rural Fire Brigade is at 12 Murray Street (25.4653°S 152.6613°E).
