= Urangan Pier =

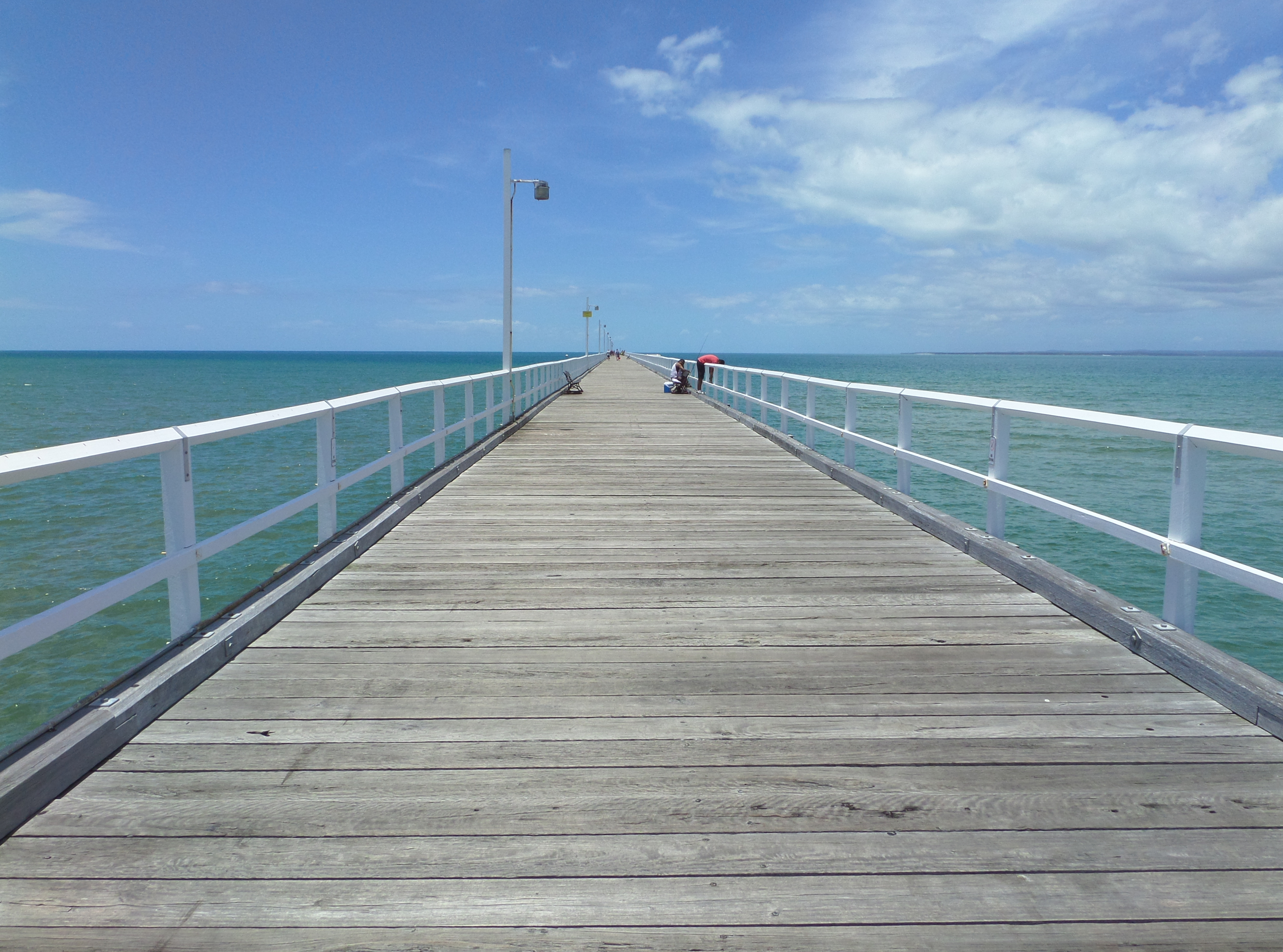
- Urangan Pier on Christmas 2013
- Coordinates: 25.2794°S 152.9058°E
- Carries: Pedestrians; Used to carry trains & produce
- Locale: Urangan, Queensland, Australia

Characteristics
- Design: Pier
- Material: Timber
- Total length: 868 metres (2,848 ft)

History
- Construction start: 1913
- Construction end: 1917
- Closed: 1985 (for commercial use)

Location
- Interactive map of Urangan Pier

Urangan Pier is a historic pier in Urangan, Hervey Bay, Queensland, Australia.

It is a former deep-water, cargo-handling facility originally built to facilitate the export of sugar, timber and coal. The pier, served by the extension of the railway line from Pialba, was used for the transfer of cargo between rail and ships. It was built between 1913 and 1917, originally to a length of 1124 metres. The pier was closed in 1985, and 239 metres of it was demolished. However, due to public outcry, 868 metres of the pier was left, and the land was given to the Hervey Bay City Council (now the Fraser Coast Regional Council).

By 2009 the last 220-metre section of the pier had been fully restored, and the original timber pylons had been replaced with steel pylons with a plastic covering.

== History ==
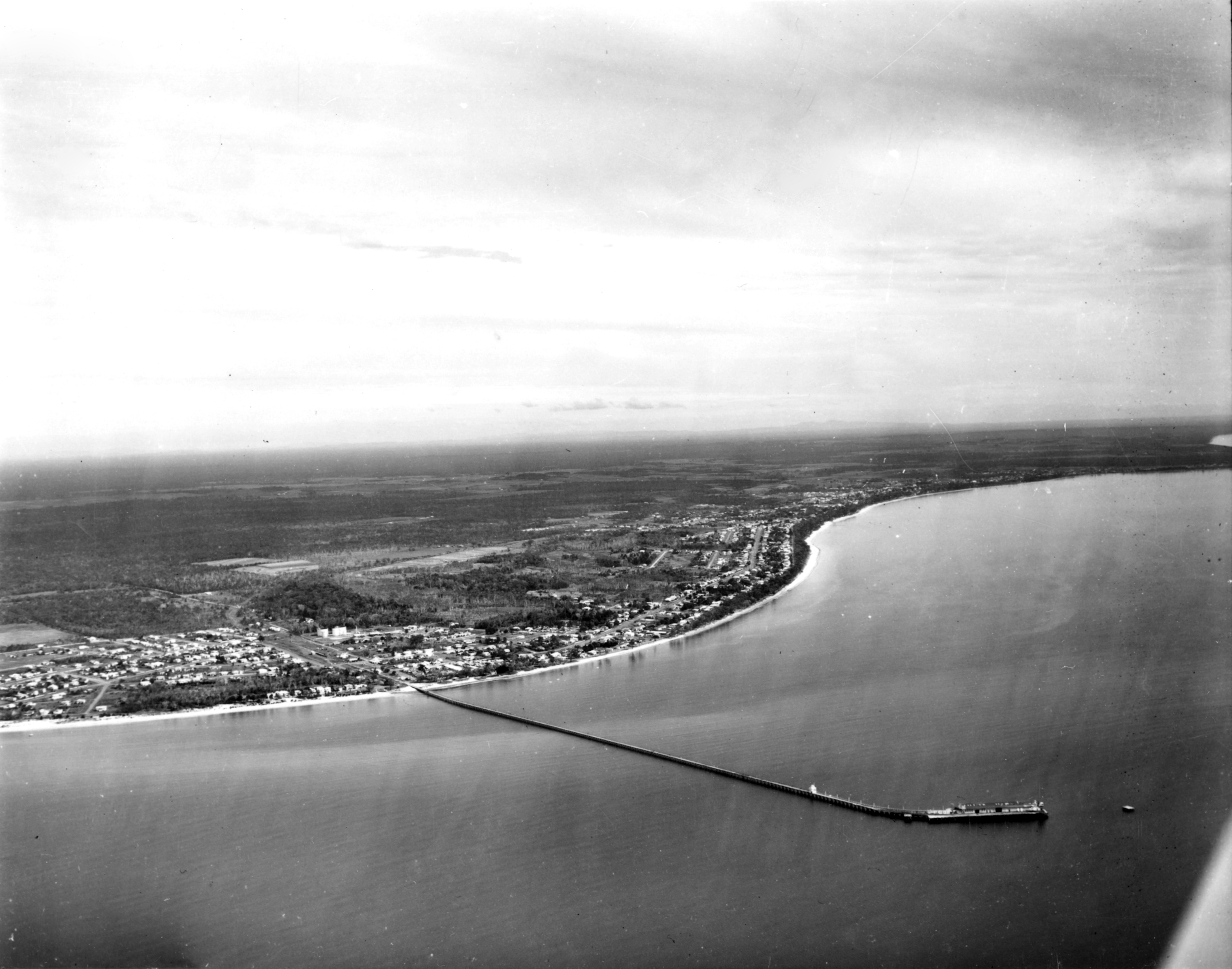
Aerial photograph of Hervey Bay looking north across the Urangan Pier, 1967

The original proposal to establish Urangan as a coal port for the Burrum River mining project did not eventuate due to several factors, mainly because the coal output did not reach original expectations. However, as the Wide Bay area was a chief producer of produce and freight, the Queensland Government made a decision to build a pier at Hervey Bay.

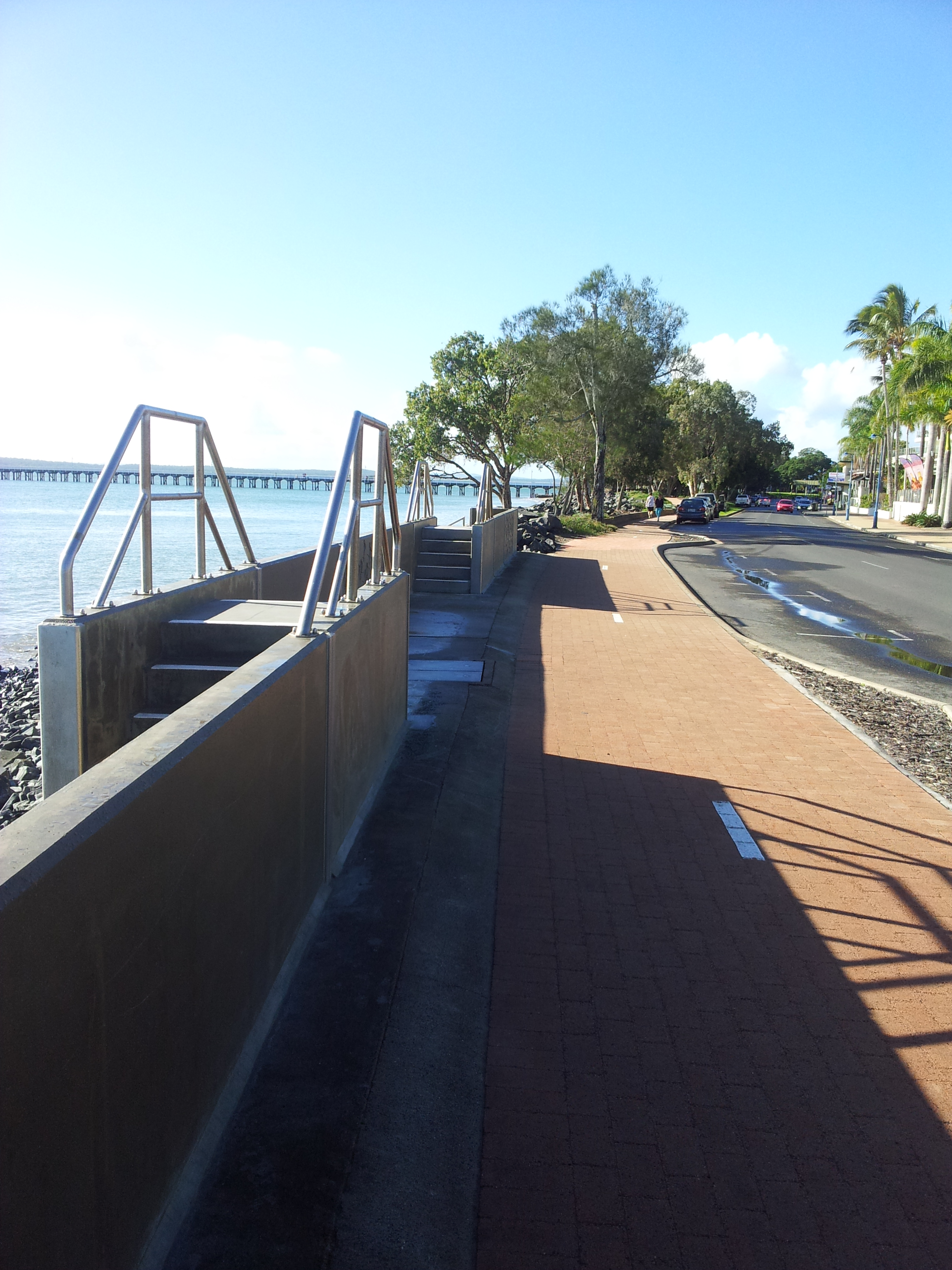
Urangan Seawall, Pier in the background

A plaque at the Urangan Pier; placed in 1999, commemorating the re-opening of the Urangan Pier.

Construction on the Urangan Pier began in 1913. To reach the deep water channel, it was required to extend 1.1 kilometres (0.68 mi) (3690 ft) out to sea. Construction was very slow and finished in 1917. The Urangan railway line also began construction in 1913 and branched off the main railway line at Pialba. This line was extended along the Urangan Pier as it was being constructed. Once it was completed, it served as one of the main ports of Queensland.

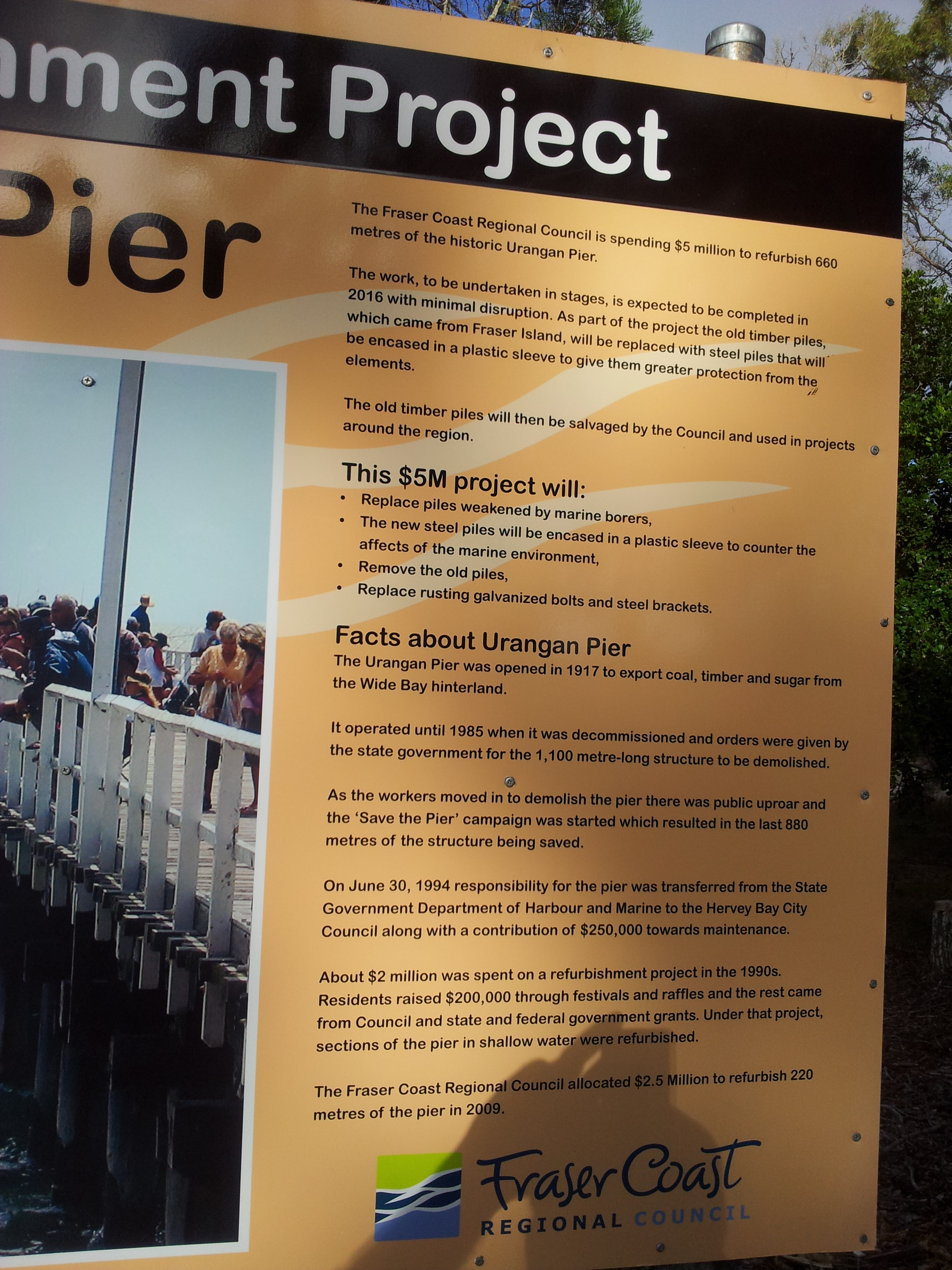
Urangan Pier Project Notice

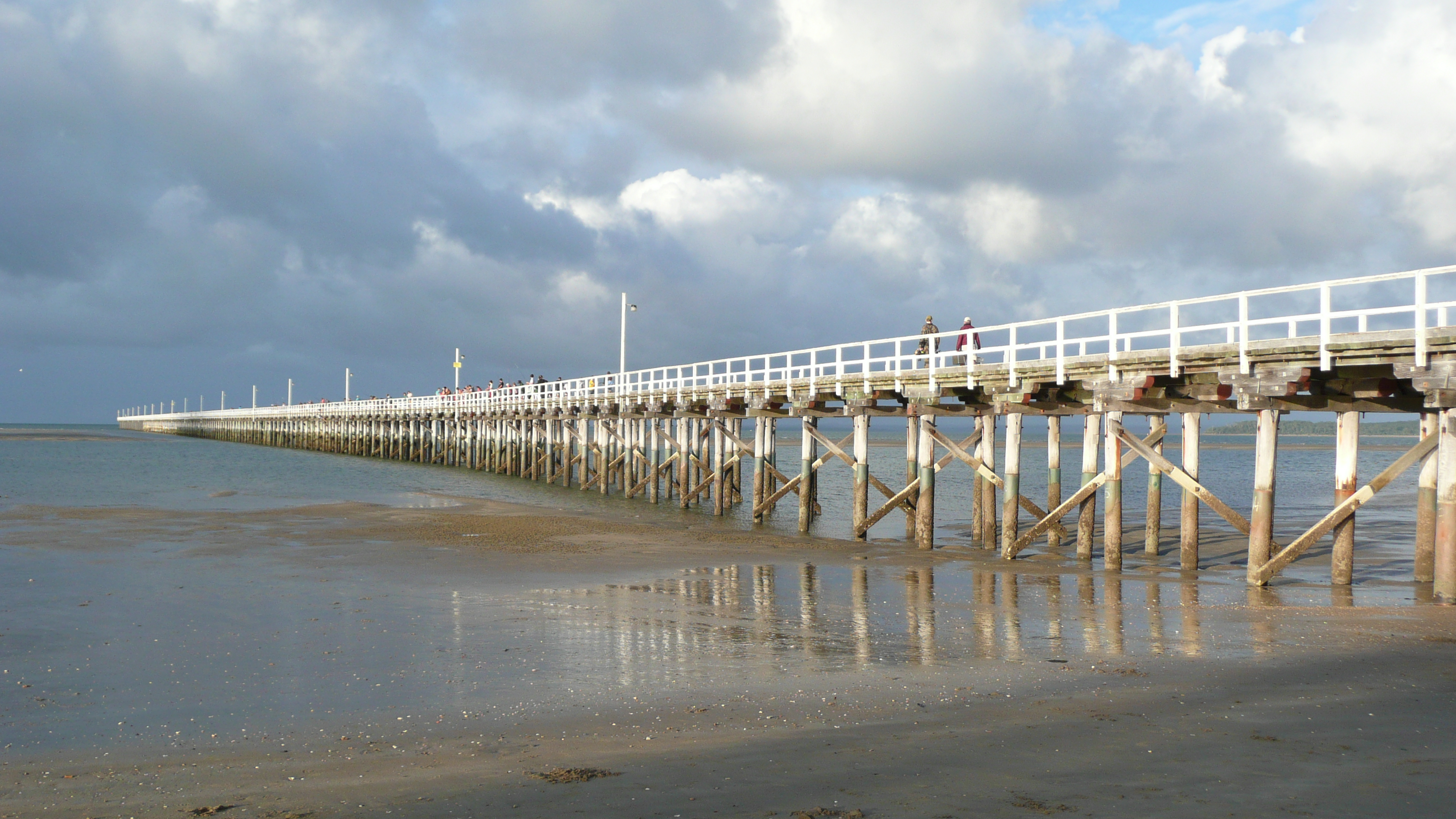
Urangan Pier in April 2010

Sugar was one of the main exports, however had to be transported from as far north as Bundaberg. When the Bundaberg Port was built in 1958, it took over sugar exports and the Urangan pier ceased exporting sugar. Timber, general cargo and produce was still exported until 1960, when Caltex built an oil terminal adjacent to the Pier. Soon after this was built, freight, goods and produce exports were stopped and fuel became the only import from the pier.

After the last ship docked at the Urangan pier in January 1985, Caltex Oil reversed the process of storage, replacing the system of fuel service from Shipping to bulk supply by rail from the Pinkenba and Colmslie port terminals in Brisbane. This, in turn, led to the closure of the pier and the Urangan branch line, as neither had a use any more. At this stage, the pier was in serious need of repairs. A decision was made by the Queensland Government to dismantle the entire pier. Due to large public outcry, rallying and petitions, the demolition of the pier was stopped. In late 1985, the Queensland Government handed the pier to the Hervey Bay City Council. The council pledged to restore the pier, which began in the late 1990s. Restoration included removing the rail tracks from the pier, encasing the wooden pylons with steel, repairing sleepers, repairing hand rails, and repairing lights.

In 1999, the pier was restored to a length of 868 meters. It was officially re-opened by the then-governor of Queensland and the mayor of Hervey Bay, Peter Arnison and Bill Brennan (respectively) on 27 November 1999.

== Urangan Pier model ==
A model of the pier was made by Mr Harry Coxon in 1917, the same year the original pier was constructed. It is a significant artefact in the Hervey Bay Historical Village & Museum's collection. Two new models are on display in the Hervey Bay Tourism Visitor Centre and in the Hervey Bay Whale Watch office at the Boat Harbour Marina.

== Urangan Pier Festival ==
The first Pier Festival was held in 1986 to help raise funds to save Urangan Pier. Since then it has become a popular fishing competition held annually in September.

== Pier to Pub Swim ==
Pier to Pub Ocean Swim Classic is an annual swimming competition held in April since 1999. The 3.4-kilometre (2.1 mi) swim is from Urangan Pier to the jetty opposite the Torquay Hotel, while the 1.6-kilometre (1 mi) short swim, called Splash for Cash, is from the corner of the Esplanade and Alexander Street to the jetty opposite the Torquay Hotel.

== See also ==
- List of piers
