= Walkers Point, Queensland =

Walkers Point
- Suburb
- Interactive map of Walkers Point
- Coordinates: 25.4955°S 152.7427°E
- Country: Australia
- State: Queensland
- LGA: Fraser Coast Region
- Location: 6.7 km (4.2 mi) NE of Maryborough; 37.6 km (23.4 mi) S of Hervey Bay; 266 km (165 mi) N of Brisbane

Government
  - State electorate: Maryborough
  - Federal division: Wide Bay

Area
  - Total: 14.2 km^{2} (5.5 sq mi)

Population
  - Total: 75 (2021 census)
  - Density: 5.28/km^{2} (13.68/sq mi)
- Time zone: UTC+10:00 (AEST)
- Postcode: 4650
Suburbs around Walkers Point
St Helens; Island Plantation	Dundathu; Island Plantation	Prawle
Maryborough	Walkers Point	Beaver Rock
Granville	Boonooroo Plains	Boonooroo Plains

Walkers Point is a rural locality in the Fraser Coast Region, Queensland, Australia. In the 2021 census, Walkers Point had a population of 75 people.

== Geography ==
The Mary River forms the western, northern, and most of the eastern boundaries.

The land is predominantly crop growing (mostly sugarcane) with some grazing on native vegetation.

== Demographics ==
In the 2016 census, Walkers Point had a population of 98 people.

In the 2021 census, Walkers Point had a population of 75 people.

== Education ==
There are no schools in Walkers Point. The nearest government primary school is Granville State School in neighbouring Granville to the south-west. The nearest government secondary school is Maryborough State High School in Maryborough to the west.
