= Torbanlea Colliery Disaster =

Mining accident near the town of Torbanlea, Australia

Coordinates: 25.3543°S 152.5948°E

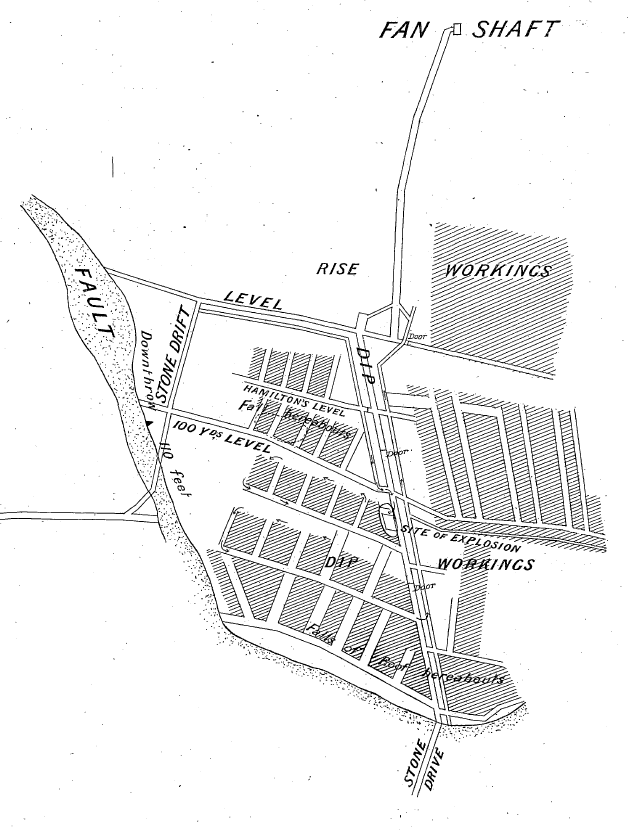
A plan of the mine showing the site of the explosion, from the royal commission into the accident

The Torbanlea Colliery Disaster was a 1900 mining accident near the town of Torbanlea in the colony of Queensland (now a state of Australia) that claimed the lives of five workers. The accident prompted a Royal Commission into mining practices within Queensland.

== Background ==
Coal had been mined in Queensland almost continuously since the settlement of the Moreton Bay District, with the city of Ipswich in particular being the site of several early collieries, and referred to as the heart of coal mining in Queensland for over a century. The Burrum and Wide Bay districts also became active centres for coal mining, with many migrants from Wales settling in the area and working in the industry.

It was known that coal existed at Torbanlea, a site north-west of Maryborough, since at least the late 1860s, with exploratory shafts being sunk and then abandoned intermittently until James Robertson, a mine engineer from Scotland, identified a potentially profitable deposit and floated a company, the Torbanlea Colliery Company, to mine it. The company subdivided land and built cottages for miners, and by 1883 there was a small but growing town on the site, complete with a railway station, hotels, and a school.

The mine itself was excavated in a pillar and stall method, whereby cavities ("rooms") approximately 7 yards (6.4 m) in width were excavated first, separated by "pillars" that were 14 yards (13 m) in width. Once the rooms were all excavated, the pillars were then removed, in a specific order so as to avoid a mine collapse. The removal of the pillars had almost been completed by 1900 when the accident occurred.

== Accident ==
At around 1 pm on 21 March, a rumbling sound was heard from within the mine, followed by a rush of air, and then a sheet of flame rushed through the upper part of the shaft as the flammable gases which had concentrated within the mine combusted. Two surviving witnesses close to the location of the explosion stated later that they had not felt any "shock or violence". A number of mining carts in the dip, not far from the site of the explosion, were found not to have moved, although a door was blown open by the force of the explosion, and a number of men were blown over by the force of the blast on the upper levels.

Five men had been working next to a pillar to the right hand side of the dip, close to the centre of the explosion. They were carried out of the mine alive, the last man to be retrieved emerging half an hour after the explosion, where they were taken by train to a hospital in nearby Maryborough. At the hospital, the five men all eventually succumbed to their injuries and died.

The five men killed during the explosion were:

- Amos Gambie
- Frederick Griggs
- Alexander Houston
- John Houston
- James Johnston

== Royal Commission ==
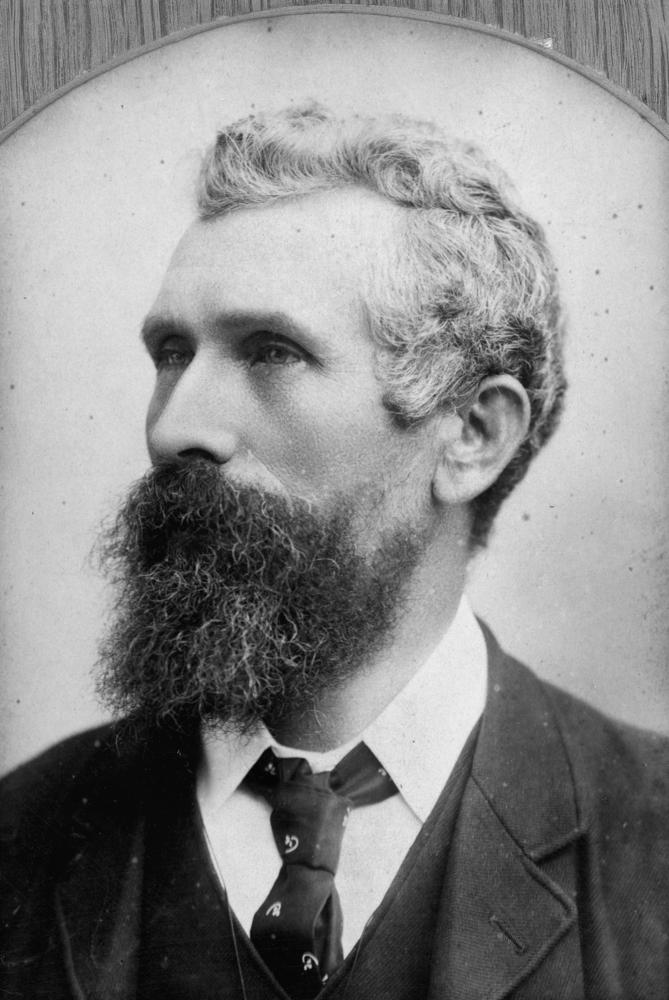
Thomas Glassey MP, one of the five commissioners

A statutory inquiry was set up following the accident, which met at Torbanlea on 3 April 1900. The four-member panel concluded that a rockfall within the mine had liberated a large quantity of flammable gas, which had then ignited, causing the explosion. The board did not apportion blame to any party, and stated that in their opinion the accident could not have been foreseen, nor prevented.

Following this statutory inquiry, the Queensland Parliament set up a royal commission to investigate the causes of the accident, and to make recommendations as to how future incidents of the same time might be prevented. The five commissioners were:

- William H. Rands
- Thomas Glassey
- William Fryar
- William Rankin
- Lewis Thomas

The commission sat for 73 days and took evidence from 53 different witnesses. The commissioners also inspected a number of coal mines, not only in the Burrum district, but in other coal mining areas within Queensland, including around the Ipswich area. Their final report came to the conclusion that it was impossible to say with any certainty where the gas that had caused the explosion had originated from (although Fryar dissented from this finding by means of a rider, stating in the report that in his opinion there was enough evidence to conclude that the gas had originated in a seam of coal underneath the mine shaft floor), and that no blame could be apportioned to any party for the circumstances which had led to the accident.

The commission made a number of recommendations, including making mandatory the use of safety lamps within mines, improved certification and training for mine managers, more inspections and ventilation for working mines, and the enactment of separate legislation for the regulation of coal mines, which at that point were managed through the same act that regulated ore mines. Glassey made a separate recommendation that all coal mines should be examined daily for gas before workers were allowed to enter, regardless of whether gas had been previously detected.

== Aftermath ==
Despite the very thorough nature of the report submitted by the Royal Commission, it was shelved and not acted upon until after the Mount Mulligan mine disaster killed 75 workers in 1921, in circumstances similar to those in Torbanlea. Following the Mount Mulligan disaster, many of the recommendations of the Royal Commission were adopted, including separate legislation for collieries and the prohibition of naked flames within coal mines.
