= Torbanlea =

- Town
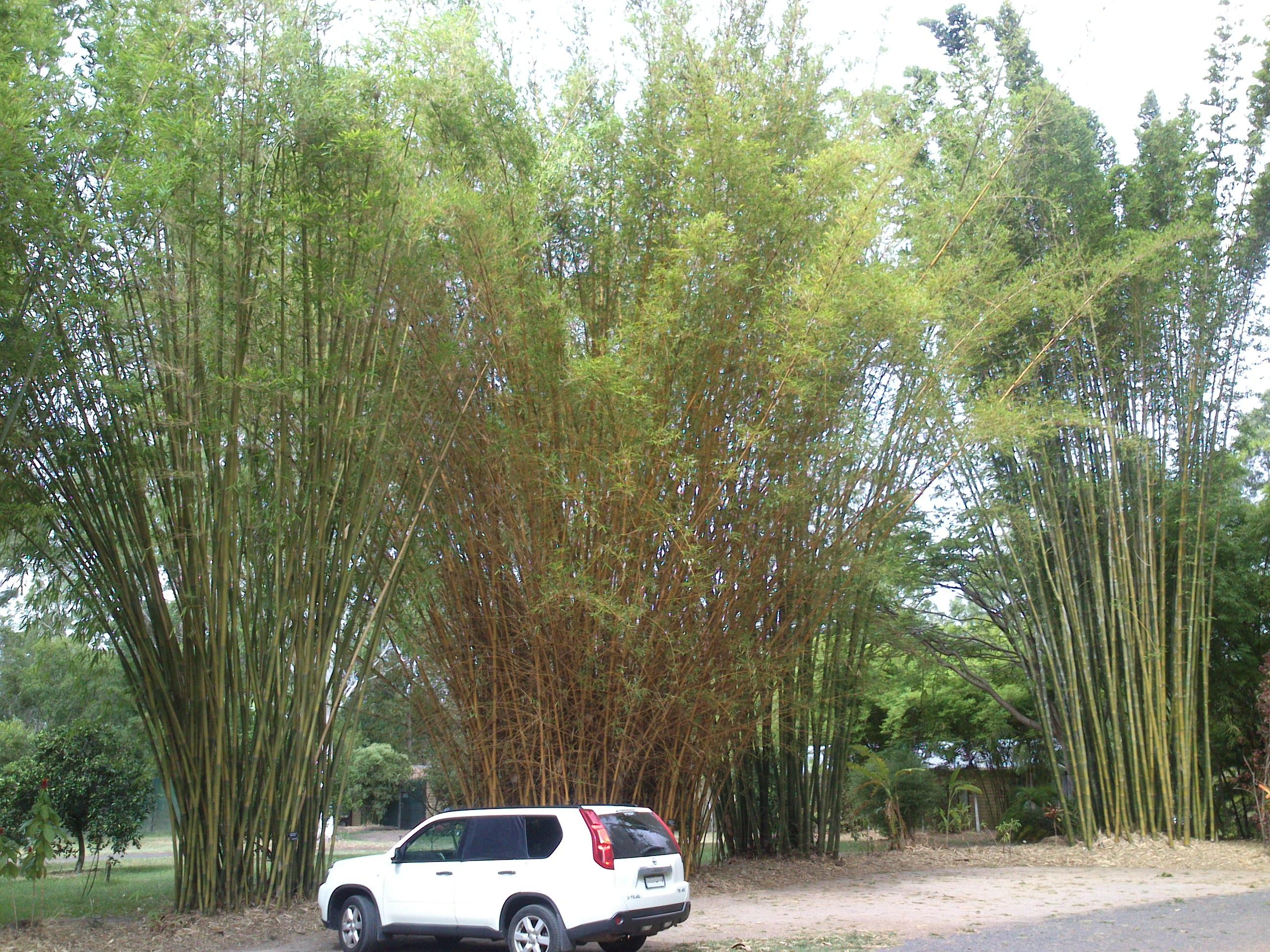
- Giant bamboo, Torbanlea, 2014

- Interactive map of Torbanlea
- Coordinates: 25.3461°S 152.5958°E
- Country: Australia
- State: Queensland
- LGA: Fraser Coast Region
- Location: 5.1 km (3.2 mi) SE of Howard; 23.5 km (14.6 mi) WSW of Hervey Bay; 25.4 km (15.8 mi) NNW of Maryborough; 274 km (170 mi) N of Brisbane

Government
  - State electorate: Maryborough
  - Federal division: Hinkler

Area
  - Total: 28.4 km^{2} (11.0 sq mi)

Population
  - Total: 841 (2021 census)
  - Density: 29.61/km^{2} (76.70/sq mi)
- Time zone: UTC+10:00 (AEST)
- Postcode: 4662
Localities around Torbanlea
Howard	Burrum Town	Burrum River
Howard	Torbanlea	Burgowan
Duckinwilla	Duckinwilla	Burgowan

Torbanlea is a rural town and locality in the Fraser Coast Region, Queensland, Australia. In the 2021 census, the locality of Torbanlea had a population of 841 people.

== Geography ==
The Burrum River forms the western and northern boundary of the locality. The town is located on the north-western edge of the locality. Torbanlea and Howard are on opposite sides of the Burrum River. The distance between the towns is 5.1 kilometres (3.2 miles).

The North Coast railway line enters the locality from the south-east (Burgowan) to the north, passes through the town, and exits to the north (Howard). The Bruce Highway enters the locality from the south (Duckinwilla), bypasses the town centre to the south, and exits to the north (Howard).

Apart from the town centre, the principal land use is farming mostly along the river and along the highway. The hillier parts of the locality in the south-east are undeveloped bushland.

== History ==
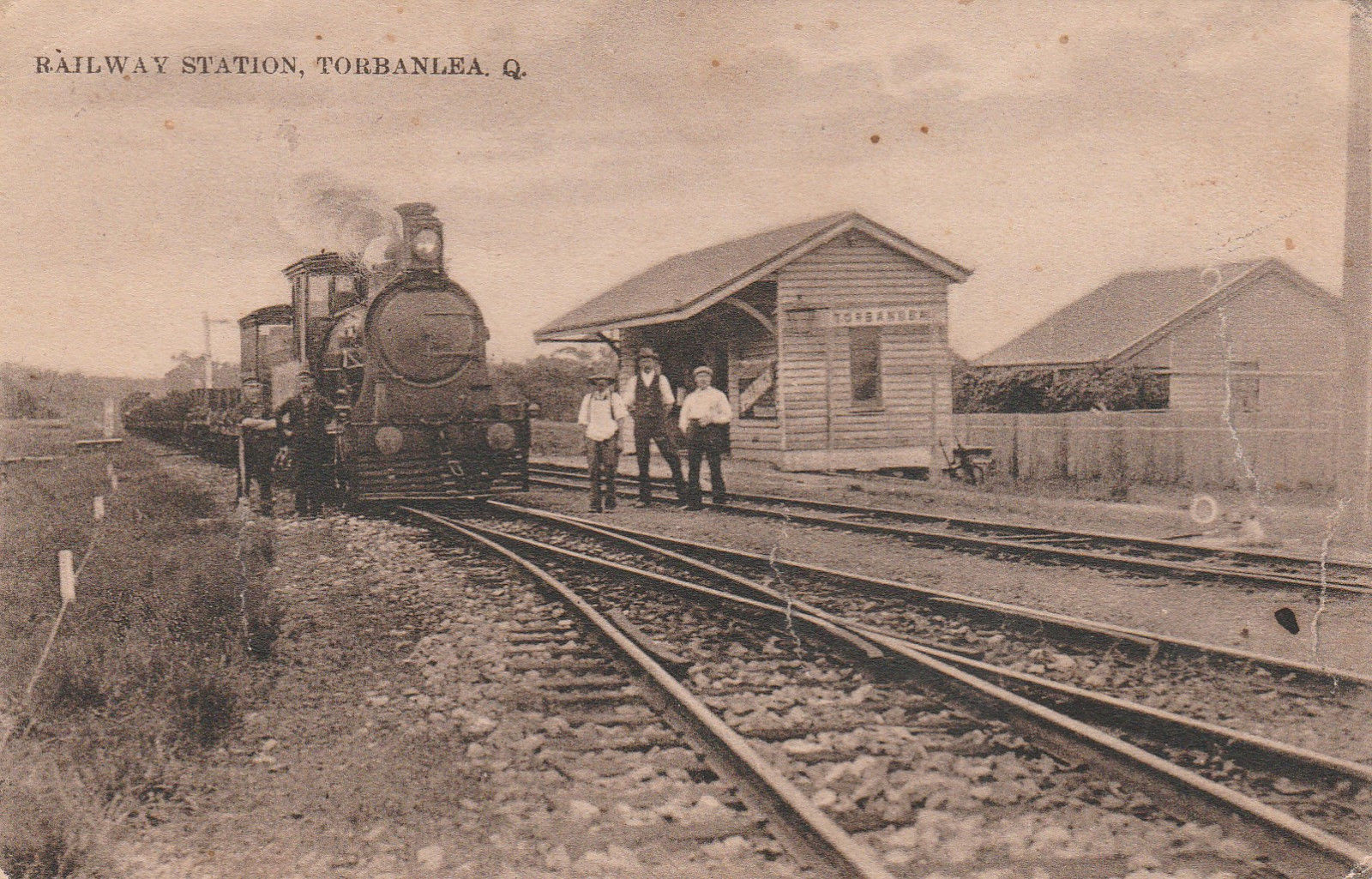
Torbanlea railway station, early 1900s

The name Torbanlea is believed to have been suggested by mining manager, James Robertson, after Torbane Hill in Scotland.

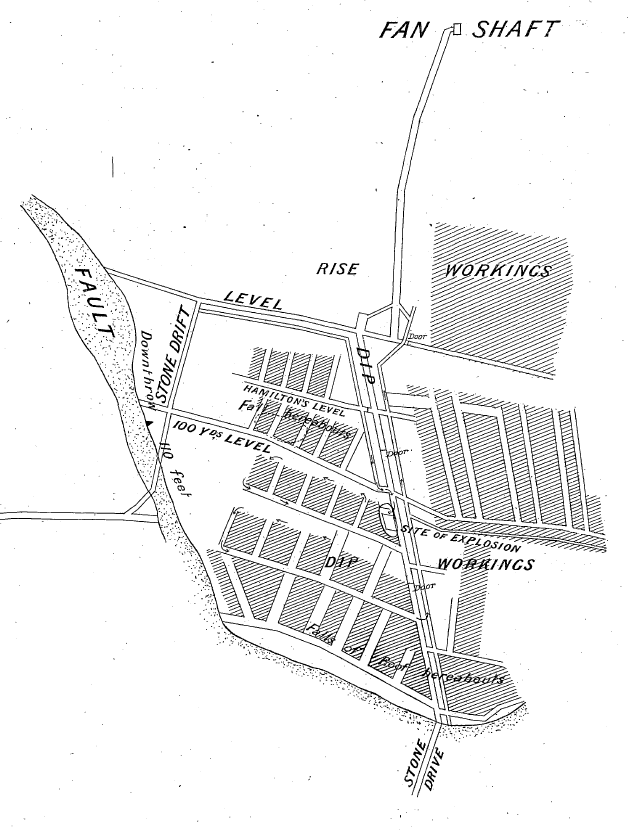
Plan of the Torbanlea mine, showing the site of the explosion of 21 March 1900

Coal was found in the area in the 1860s, but initial mining efforts were unsuccessful in locating a major seam. In August 1884, the Torbanlea Colliery Company began to mine a profitable deep coal seam.

James Robertson purchased 700 acres of pastoral land in 1876, and named the property Torbanlea.

In 1883, the railway line from Maryborough to the Burrum River opened, and was known as the Burrum line, enabling coal from mines on the south side of the Burrum River to be transported to Maryborough. The former Torbanlea railway station was near the intersection of Burgowan Street and Dundabarra Street in the town centre (25.3472°S 152.5980°E) in the town centre.

Torbanlea State School opened on 26 September 1887.

Torbanlea Primitive Methodist Church opened on Sunday 22 March 1891 by Reverend John Prowse. Prior to this Reverend E. Knight held services in Torbanlea under a tree and in the Reading Room hall. Andrew Fisher was a Sunday School teacher in those early years. With the amalgamation of the Methodist denominations circa 1900, the church became the Torbanlea Methodist Church. With the amalgamation of the Methodist Church into the Uniting Church in Australia in 1977, it became the Torbanlea Uniting Church. The church is now closed and the congregation amalgamated with the Howard Uniting Church. The church building was sold into private ownership in November 2015 for $80,000. As at June 2024, the church building at 12 Gympie Street (25.34642°S 152.59456°E) is still extant.

St Stephen's Anglican Church opened circa 1896. It closed circa 1988. It was at 10 Crawford Street (25.3472°S 152.5957°E). It was sold into private ownership in September 1989 for $25,000. As at August 2020, the church building is still extant, but modified to become a private residence.

An accident at a nearby colliery killed five workers in 1900.

In May 1984, the Bruce Highway bypass was opened. Previously the highway had run through the town on Robertson Street. Howard was also bypassed as part of same project.

== Demographics ==
In the 2011 census, the locality of Torbanlea had a population of 871 people.

In the 2016 census, the locality of Torbanlea had a population of 791 people.

In the 2021 census, the locality of Torbanlea had a population of 841 people.

== Train Factory ==
The manufacture of more than 60 trains at a facility in Torbanlea is planned ahead of the 2032 Brisbane Olympic Games. This represented the largest investment in train manufacturing in the State. The publicly owned facilities will cost an estimated $239 million to build. The Queensland Train Manufacturing Program is valued at $9.5 billion. The Fraser Coast Mayor, George Seymour, has stated that the re-emergence of manufacturing in the region will be beneficial for the Fraser Coast economy as well as reflect its history as a manufacturing region, stating: "We have generations and generations of Maryborough men and woman who have been involved in manufacturing through world wars, building ships, building trains, and we want to do that into the future."

== Education ==
Torbanlea State School is a government primary (Prep-6) school for boys and girls at Pialba Road (25.3479°S 152.5998°E). In 2018, the school had an enrolment of 305 students with 24 teachers (22 full-time equivalent) and 15 non-teaching staff (11 full-time equivalent). It includes a special education program.

There is no secondary school in Torbanlea. The nearest government secondary schools are Hervey Bay State High School in Pialba in Hervey Bay to the north-east and Aldridge State High School in Maryborough to the south.

== Amenities ==
The Torbanlea Skate Park was opened in 2021.

The Burgowan Bowls Club is located at 4 George Street, Torbanlea.

The Torbanlea Picnic Races are held annually.

Howard/Torbanlea Uniting Church is in Coal Street, Howard (25.3163°S 152.5581°E). It is part of the Mary Burnett Presbytery of the Uniting Church in Australia.
