= Granville, Queensland =

Granville
- Suburb
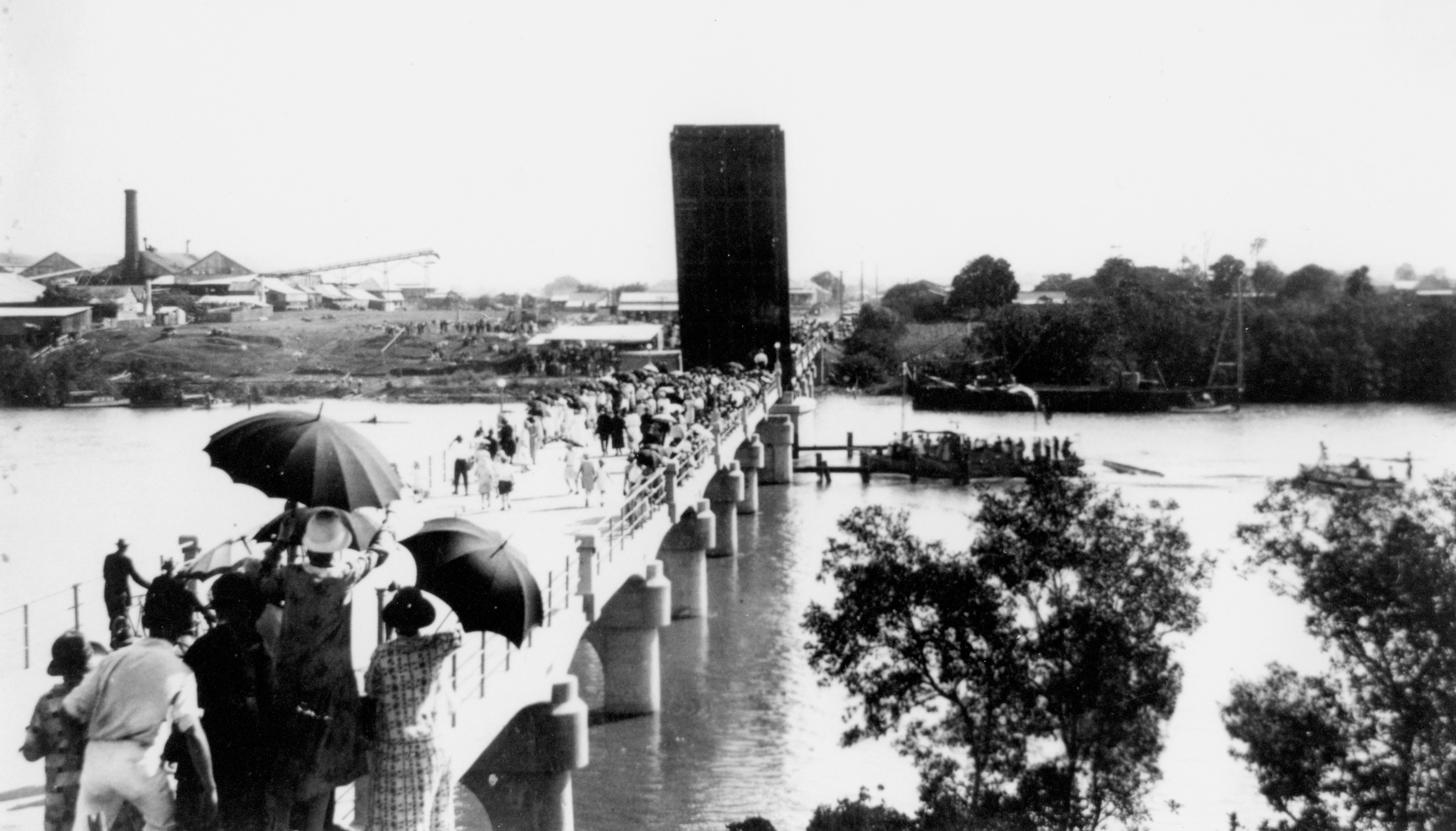
- Opening of the Granville Bridge, 11 December 1926a

- Interactive map of Granville
- Coordinates: 25.54°S 152.7372°E
- Country: Australia
- State: Queensland
- City: Maryborough
- LGA: Fraser Coast Region
- Location: 2.5 km (1.6 mi) E of Maryborough; 33.4 km (20.8 mi) SSW of Hervey Bay; 271 km (168 mi) N of Brisbane

Government
  - State electorate: Maryborough
  - Federal division: Wide Bay

Area
  - Total: 11.8 km^{2} (4.6 sq mi)

Population
  - Total: 2,532 (2021 census)
  - Density: 214.6/km^{2} (555.7/sq mi)
- Time zone: UTC+10:00 (AEST)
- Postcode: 4650
Suburbs around Granville
Maryborough	Walkers Point	Walkers Point
Maryborough	Granville	Boonooroo Plains
Maryborough	Bidwill	Boonooroo Plains

Granville is a mixed-use locality in the Fraser Coast Region, Queensland, Australia. It is a suburb of Maryborough. In the 2021 census, Granville had a population of 2,532 people.

== Geography ==
The Mary River forms the north-western boundary and most of the south-western. The Granville Bridge at Odessa Street crosses the river to Tiger Street in Maryborough (25.54334°S 152.71441°E).

The land use is a mixture of suburban housing, crop growing (predominantly sugarcane), and grazing on native vegetation.

== History ==
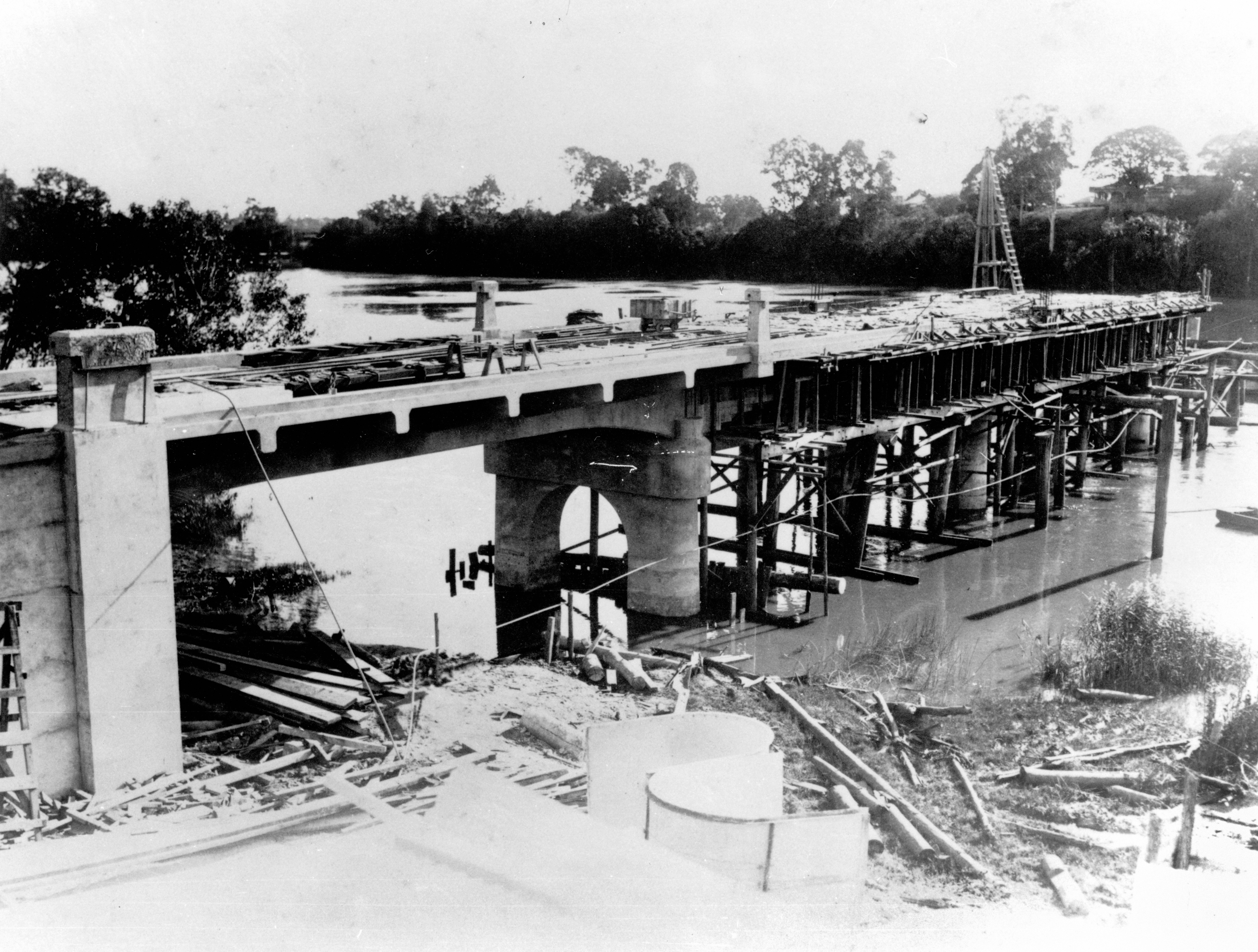
Granville Bridge under construction, circa 1926

Maryborough East State School opened on 24 May 1875. In 1938, it was renamed Granville State School.

Granville State School War Memorial was unveiled on 2 April 1921.

Granville Baptist Church opened in 1922. The official opening was on Saturday 18 March 1922. It was in Cambridge Street. It was demolished in 1972 and the timber used for extensions to the Baptist Church in Fort Street, Maryborough.

The Granville Bridge was officially opened on Saturday 11 December 1926. It is a concrete bridge included a steel lifting span that allows boats to pass through (no longer in use).

== Demographics ==
In the 2016 census, Granville had a population of 2,716 people.

In the 2021 census, Granville had a population of 2,532 people.

== Education ==
Granville State School is a government primary (Prep-6) school for boys and girls at Cambridge Street (25.5385°S 152.7154°E). In 2018, the school had an enrolment of 277 students with 28 teachers (24 full-time equivalent) and 21 non-teaching staff (16 full-time equivalent). It includes a special education program.

There are no secondary schools in Granville. The nearest government secondary school is Maryborough State High School in neighbouring Maryborough.

== Attractions ==
Granville State School War Memorial commemorates those local people who enlisted and those who died in World War I. The memorial lists 53 names, many of whom attended the school. It is on the school grounds (25.53852°S 152.71431°E).

== Amenities ==
The main parkland in Granville is the Brendan Hansnen Park, which inlcludes a skatepark and an off leash fenced dog park.

== Notable residents ==
Brendan Hansen (politician)

Mary Hansen
