= St Helens, Queensland (Fraser Coast Region) =

St Helens
- Suburb
- Interactive map of St Helens
- Coordinates: 25.4830°S 152.7052°E
- Country: Australia
- State: Queensland
- LGA: Fraser Coast Region
- Location: 6.3 km (3.9 mi) N of Maryborough; 24.6 km (15.3 mi) SSW of Hervey Bay; 268 km (167 mi) N of Brisbane

Government
  - State electorate: Maryborough
  - Federal division: Wide Bay

Area
  - Total: 8.8 km^{2} (3.4 sq mi)

Population
  - Total: 123 (2021 census)
  - Density: 13.98/km^{2} (36.2/sq mi)
- Time zone: UTC+10:00 (AEST)
- Postcode: 4650
Suburbs around St Helens
Aldershot	Dundathu	Walkers Point
Aldershot	St Helens	Island Plantation
Maryborough	Maryborough	Island Plantation

St Helens is a rural locality in the Fraser Coast Region, Queensland, Australia. In the 2021 census, St Helens had a population of 123 people.

== Geography ==
The Mary River forms the short north-eastern boundary, while Saltwater Creek forms the north-western and northern boundaries on its way to the Mary.

Saltwater Creek Road enters the locality from the south-east (Maryborough) and exits to north-east (Dundathu), crossing the Saltwater Creek via the Campbell Bridge.

== History ==
The establishment of a school was officially approved in February 1881 with tenders called to erect the school building and teacher's residence in March 1881. However, the chosen builder rejected the contract in November 1881, leading to delays in the construction of the school. St Helens State School opened on Saltwater Creek Road on 16 August 1882 under headmaster Robert Barry.

The Agnew School (Maryborough) opened in St Helens on 3 February 2003. It is now known as the Maryborough campus of OneSchool Global.

Maryborough Victory Church was built from brick in 1985.

== Demographics ==
In the 2016 census, St Helens had a population of 128 people.

In the 2021 census, St Helens had a population of 123 people.

== Education ==
St Helens State School is a government primary (Prep-6) school for boys and girls at 891 Saltwater Creek Road (25.5027°S 152.7105°E). In 2018, the school had an enrolment of 306 students with 22 teachers (20 full-time equivalent) and 16 non-teaching staff (12 full-time equivalent). In 2023, the school had an enrolment of 304 students with 24 teachers (21 full-time equivalent) and 19 non-teaching staff (12 full-time equivalent).

The Maryborough campus of OneSchool Global (formerly known as the Agnew School) is a primary and secondary (3-12) school at 19 Fazio Road (25.49593°S 152.7085°E). It is operated by the Plymouth Brethren Christian Church. As at 26 October 2024, the school had an enrolment of 39 students.

There are no government secondary schools in St Helens. The nearest government secondary school is Aldridge State High School in neighbouring Maryborough to the south.

== Amenities ==
Maryborough Victory Church is an independent church at 5 Fazio Road (25.495762°S 152.7095°E).
