= Cooloola, Queensland =

Cooloola
- Suburb
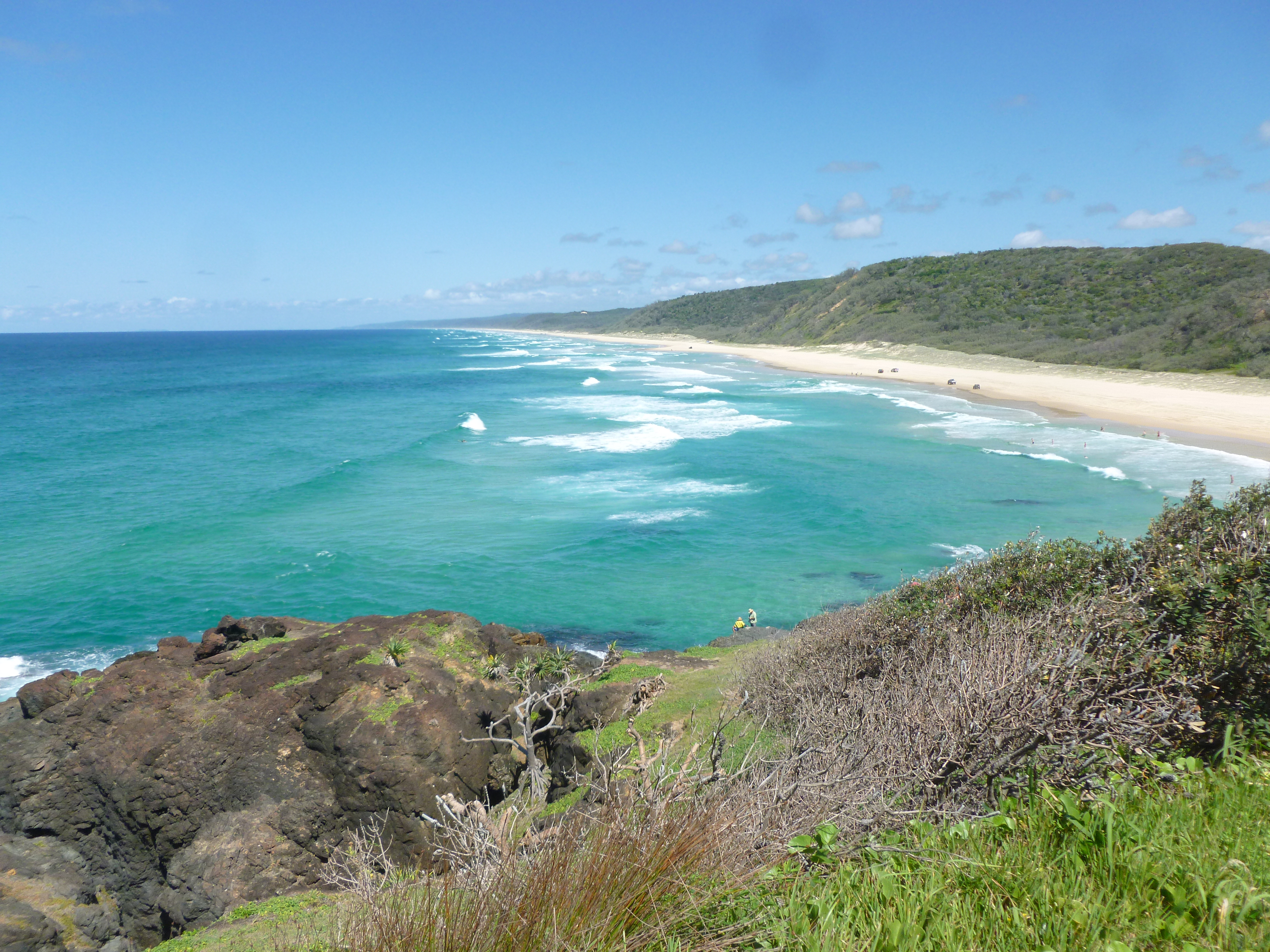
- Double Island Point, Cooloola, 2016

- Interactive map of Cooloola
- Coordinates: 26.0333°S 153.0638°E
- Country: Australia
- State: Queensland
- LGA: Gympie Region
- Location: 42.1 km (26.2 mi) SE of Tin Can Bay; 83.0 km (51.6 mi) NE of Gympie; 260 km (160 mi) N of Brisbane

Government
  - State electorate: Gympie
  - Federal division: Wide Bay

Area
  - Total: 474.5 km^{2} (183.2 sq mi)
- Elevation: 4 m (13 ft)

Population
  - Total: 0 (2021 census)
  - Density: 0.0000/km^{2} (0.0000/sq mi)
- Time zone: UTC+10:00 (AEST)
- Postcode: 4580
Suburbs around Cooloola
| Tin Can Bay | Inskip | Rainbow Beach |
| Cooloola Cove | Cooloola | Coral Sea |
| Toolara Forest | Como | Noosa North Shore |

Cooloola is a coastal locality in the Gympie Region, Queensland, Australia. In the 2021 census, Cooloola had "no people or a very low population".

== Geography ==
Cooloola is a coastal locality, being bounded by Wide Bay in the Coral Sea to the east including the major headland, Double Island Point. From Double Island Point, Rainbow Beach extends to the west and then to the north, while Teewah Beach stretches for many kilometres to the south. The locality's north-west boundary is Tin Can Inlet off Tin Can Bay.

Off the coast of Double Island Point is Wolf Rock which is Queensland's most important habitat area for the critically endangered grey nurse shark. It is a mating area and a high number of females and pregnant females have been seen there.

The entire locality is a protected area, mostly within the Great Sandy National Park except for a small area on Double Island Point which is within the Double Island Point Conservation Park. Consistent with its protected status, the land use is nature conservation with very limited development apart from some basic bushwalking and camping infrastructure with a number of strict rules about its use.

== History ==
In 1865, William Pettigrew discovered the timber resources of the Cooloola area and established a sawmill and a tramway to harvest the timber. Timber cutting continued in the area until the 1960s when proposals to introduce sand mining and other kinds of development of the area resulted in protests about the environmental damage that it would cause. In 1975, the area was gazetted as the Cooloola National Park (later renamed the Great Sandy National Park).

== Demographics ==
In the 2011 census, Cooloola had "no people or a very low population".

In the 2016 census, Cooloola had a population of 3 people.

In the 2021 census, Cooloola had "no people or a very low population".

== Heritage listings ==
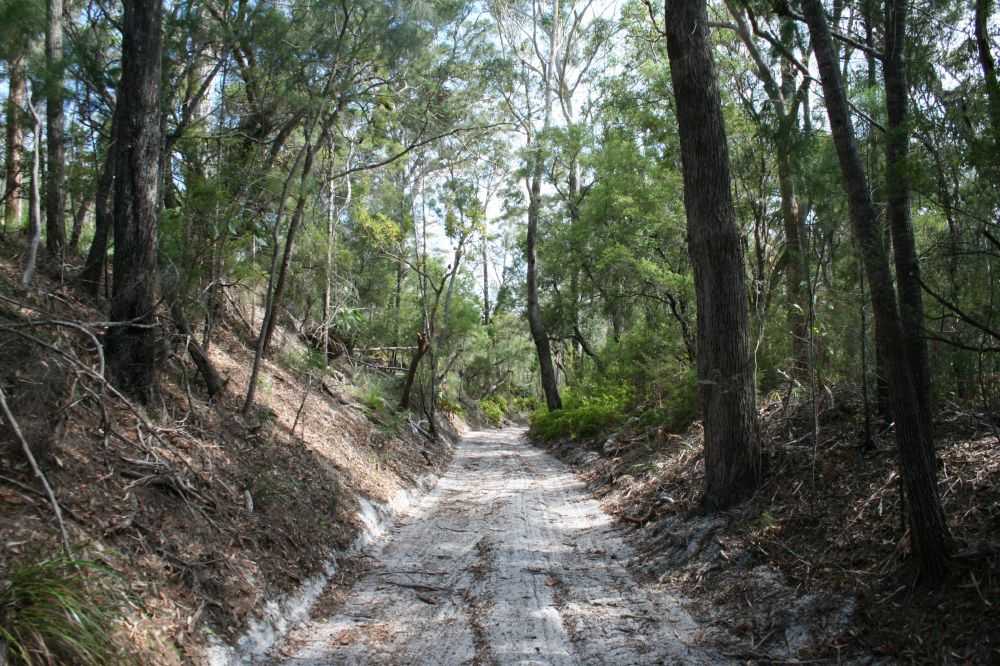
Cooloola Tramway cutting, 2012

Cooloola has a number of heritage-listed sites, including:

- Cooloola Tramway (25.9936°S 153.0763°E)
- Double Island Point Light (25.93199°S 153.18714°E)

== Attractions ==
The Cooloola Great Walk is a 5-day walking track through Cooloola through to Rainbow Beach (to the north) and Noosa North Shore to the south.

== Education ==
There are no schools in Cooloola. The nearest government primary schools are Rainbow Beach State School in neighbouring Rainbow Beach to the north-east and Tin Can Bay State School in neighbouring Tin Can Bay to the north-west. The nearest government secondary school is Tin Can Bay State School (to Year 10). There are no nearby secondary schools providing education to Year 12; the alternatives are distance education and boarding school.

== See also ==
- List of tramways in Queensland
