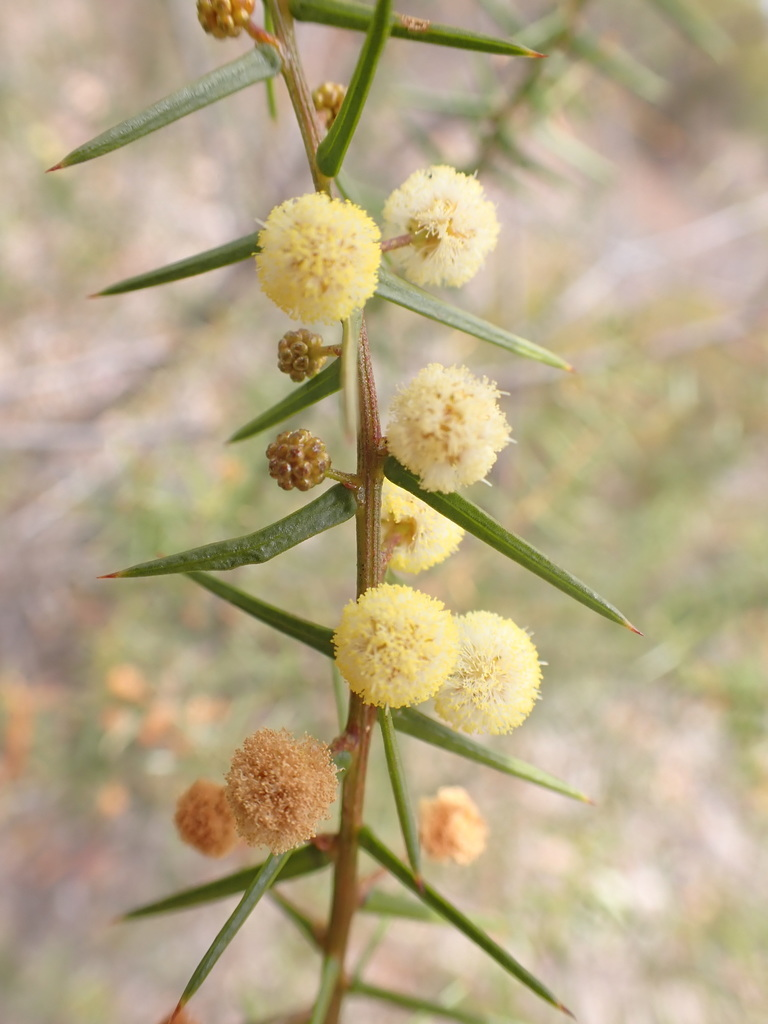
- Near Mount Arapiles

Scientific classification
- Kingdom: Plantae
- Clade: Embryophytes
- Clade: Tracheophytes
- Clade: Spermatophytes
- Clade: Angiosperms
- Clade: Eudicots
- Clade: Rosids
- Order: Fabales
- Family: Fabaceae
- Subfamily: Caesalpinioideae
- Clade: Mimosoid clade
- Genus: Acacia
- Species: A. rupicola

Binomial name
- Acacia rupicola F.Muell. ex Benth.
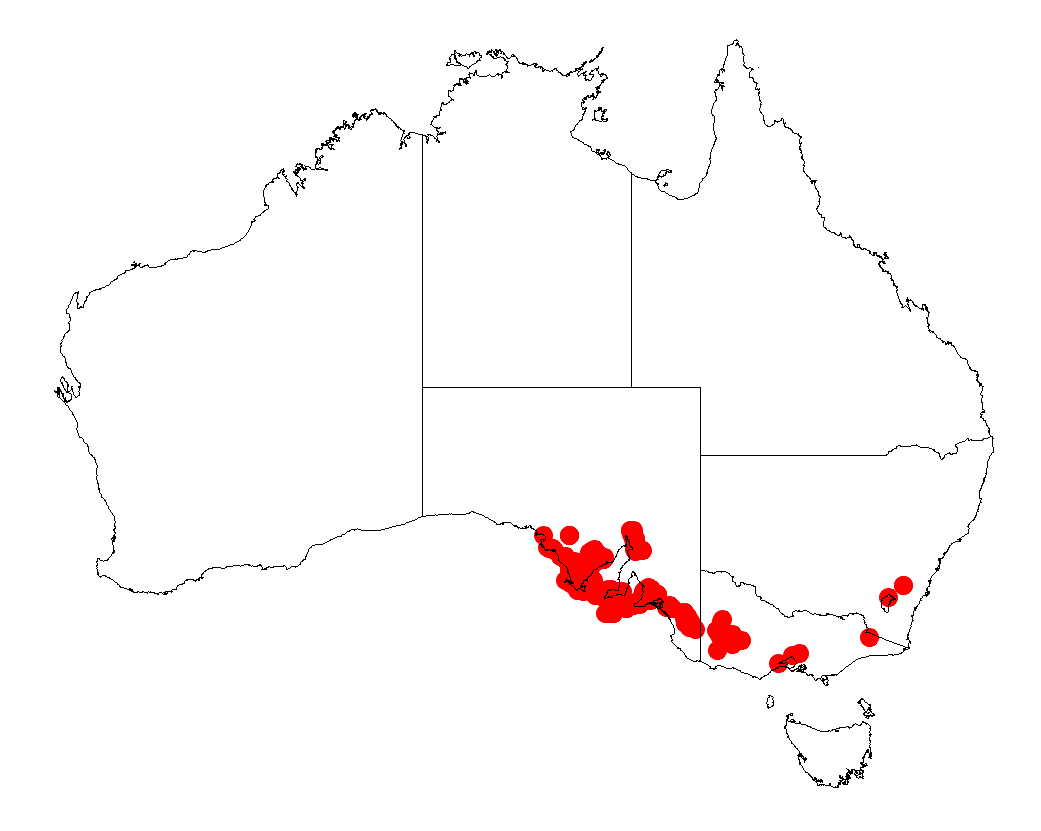
- Occurrence data from AVH

= Acacia rupicola =

Rock wattle

Species of legume

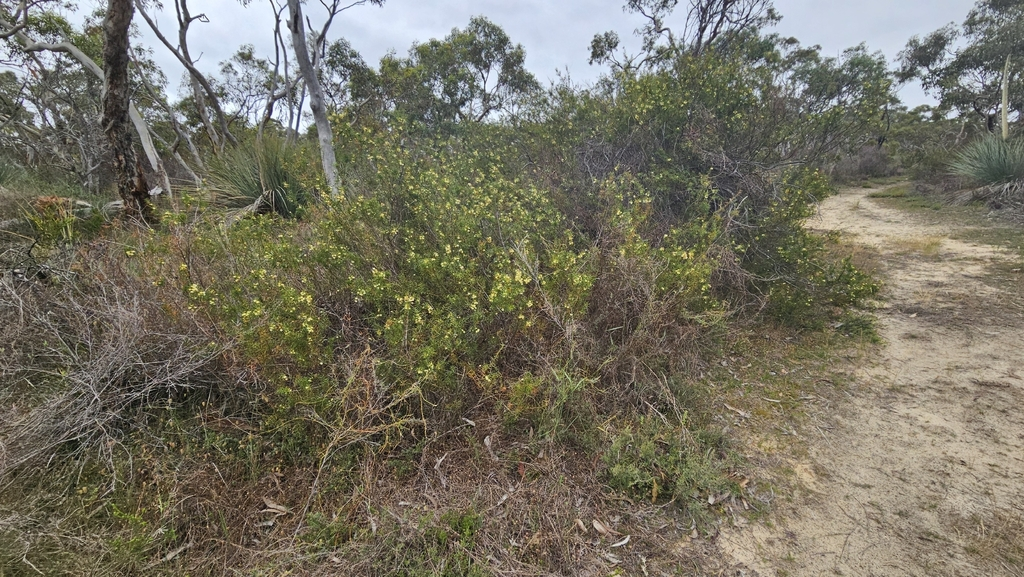
Habit in the McLaren Vale area in South Australia

Acacia rupicola, commonly known as rock wattle, is a shrub belonging to the genus Acacia and the subgenus Phyllodineae native to south eastern Australia.

== Description ==
The glabrous, diffuse and somewhat resinous shrub typically grows to a height of 1 to 2.5 metres (3.3 to 8.2 ft). It has prominently ribbed branchlets with no stipules and sessile, patent, green phyllodes with a narrowly triangular to linear-triangular shape that are 5 to 25 mm (0.20 to 0.98 in) in length and 1.5 to 3 mm (0.059 to 0.118 in) wide with a prominent midrib. It blooms between August and January with sporadic flowering at other times producing yellow flowers.

It is very similar in appearance to Acacia ulicifolia (Prickly Moses) but is easily distinguished by the sticky appearance of A. rupicola.

== Distribution ==
It is endemic to a large area extending from the Eyre Peninsula in South Australia in the west thorough to Bordertown and to the Grampians in the Victoria in the east. It is found in rocky coastal areas in sandy to loamy soils often as a part of open scrub or woodland communities.

== Cultivation ==
It can be grown form seed or cuttings. The shrub is recommended as an understorey plant that can be grown in a second line from the coast, plains or foot-slopes which fares well in dry full sun or shady locations or rocky areas. It is often used in parks, reserves, highway verges, batters and wide median strips but requires well-drained soils. It is known to be both bird and insect attracting, tolerate drought and a moderate frost.

== See also ==
- List of Acacia species
