= Wallu, Queensland =

Wallu
- Suburb
- Interactive map of Wallu
- Coordinates: 25.9511°S 152.9080°E
- Country: Australia
- State: Queensland
- LGA: Gympie Region
- Location: 11.5 km (7.1 mi) SW of Tin Can Bay; 41.2 km (25.6 mi) NE of Gympie; 212 km (132 mi) N of Brisbane

Government
  - State electorate: Gympie
  - Federal division: Wide Bay

Area
  - Total: 2.0 km^{2} (0.77 sq mi)

Population
  - Total: 108 (2021 census)
  - Density: 54.0/km^{2} (140/sq mi)
- Time zone: UTC+10:00 (AEST)
- Postcode: 4570
Suburbs around Wallu
Toolara Forest	Tin Can Bay	Tin Can Bay
Toolara Forest	Wallu	Tin Can Bay
Toolara Forest	Toolara Forest	Tin Can Bay

Wallu is a rural residential locality in the Gympie Region, Queensland, Australia. In the 2021 census, Wallu had a population of 108 people.

== Geography ==
Wallu is a dumbbell-shaped locality with two separate sections connected by a 1.5-kilometre (0.93 mi) stretch of Tin Can Bay road. The land use of western section is predominantly rural residential housing, while the eastern section is a mixture of rural residential housing and quarrying. The western section is surrounded on three sides by the Toolara State Forest with the fourth (north-eastern side) adjacent to the Wide Bay Military Training Area. The eastern section also has Toolara State Forest to its south and the training area on two other sides (the fourth south-eastern side being undeveloped freehold land and the Great Sandy National Park).

== History ==
Wallu State School opened on 1 February 1934. In January 1937, tenders were called to relocate Bell's Bridge State School building to Wallu State School. On 22 April 1937, it was renamed Tin Can Bay State School on 21 April 1937, reflecting the town name changing from Wallu to Tin Can Bay.

== Demographics ==
In the 2016 census, Wallu had a population of 85 people.

In the 2021 census, Wallu had a population of 108 people.

== Education ==
There are no schools in Wallu. The nearest government primary school is Tin Can Bay State School in neighbouring Tin Can Bay to the north-east. The nearest government secondary schools are Tin Can Bay State School (to Year 10) and Gympie State High School (to Year 12) in Gympie to the west.
