= Cooloola Tramway =

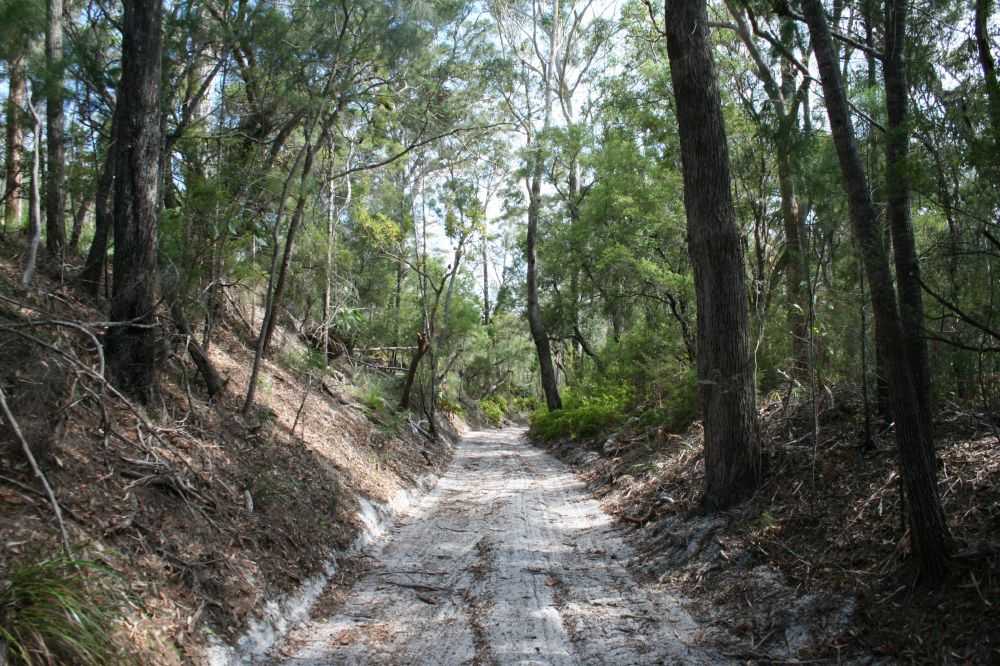
- Cooloola Tramway, cutting through the forest, 2012

- Location within Queensland Location within Australia
- 25.9936°S 153.0763°E
- Location: Great Sandy National Park, Cooloola Recreation Area, Cooloola, Gympie Region, Queensland, Australia

History
- Design period: 1870s - 1890s (late 19th century)
- Built for: William Pettigrew

Queensland Heritage Register
- Official name: Pettigrew's Cooloola Timber Tramway Complex, Cooloola Railway, SEQ-5N 22, Pettigrew's Railway, Pettigrew's Tramway
- Type: state heritage (landscape, archaeological, built)
- Designated: 12 July 2013
- Reference no.: 602819
- Significant period: 1860s-1884
- Significant components: cutting - tramway, embankment - tramway

The Cooloola Tramway is a heritage-listed tramway at Great Sandy National Park, Cooloola Recreation Area, Cooloola, Gympie Region, Queensland, Australia. In the 1870s it was known as the Kaloola Railway. It is also known as Cooloola Railway, SEQ-5N 22, Pettigrew's Railway, and Pettigrew's Tramway. It was added to the Queensland Heritage Register on 12 July 2013.

== History ==
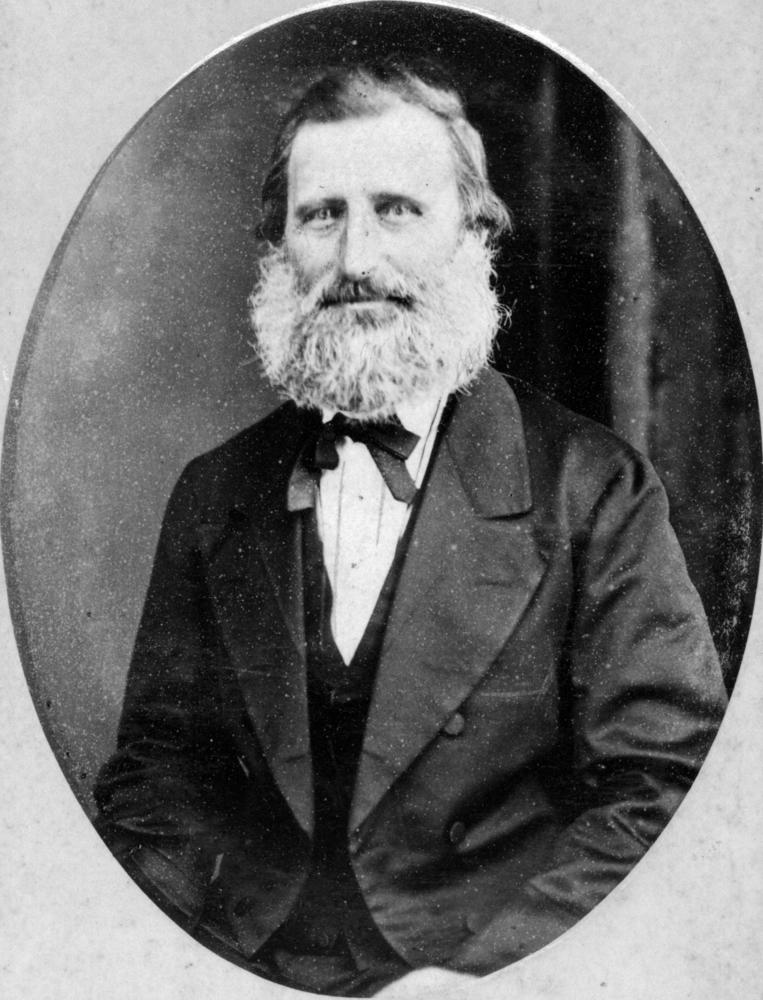
William Pettigrew, 1875

William Pettigrew's Cooloola timber operation began in the 1860s with the extraction of timber from Woolann (the area around Lake Poona). Bullock teams were used to drag kauri pine logs to the mouth of Seary's Creek. The sandy nature of the terrain and lack of feed for horses and bullocks made traditional forms of timber transport unfeasible and Pettigrew had to find a solution to access the rich timber of inland Cooloola. The answer was the construction of a tramway: Cooloola Tramway opening in October 1873 as Queensland's first major private railway.

Of all Queensland's natural resources "timber was the most visible and abundant to the first Europeans". Early European accounts of Queensland frequently refer to the extensive stands of timber which lined the coast and river banks. In south-east Queensland the dominant timber species were softwoods such as hoop (Araucaria cunninghamii) and kauri pine (Agathis robusta). When Moreton Bay was opened up to free settlement in 1842 the colony did not have a sawmill and logged timber was either pit sawn and used locally, or sent south for milling and/or export.

The timber industry played a vital role in the economic development of Queensland and William Pettigrew was instrumental in this process. He was born in Ayrshire, Scotland, in 1825 and came to Moreton Bay in 1849 as one of Dr John Dunmore Lang's immigrants on board the Fortitude. Pettigrew was engaged as a surveyor and land agent by Lang. When Lang's immigration scheme collapsed, Pettigrew worked with Assistant Government Surveyor, James Warner. In this role he gained "first-hand knowledge of the local timber resources and the need for a sawmill to facilitate the expansion following the transformation of Brisbane from convict settlement to free society".

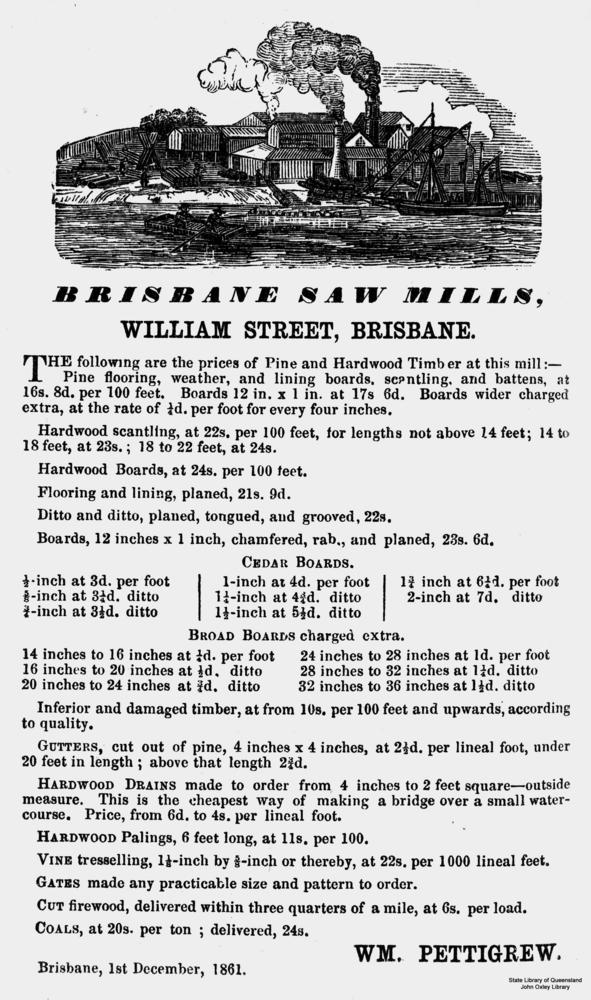
Advertisement for William Pettigrew's sawmill, corner of William and Margaret Streets by the Brisbane River, 1861

In 1853 Pettigrew established Queensland's first steam sawmill on land adjacent to the Brisbane River, at the western corner of William and Margaret streets in Brisbane. According to Kerr, Pettigrew's sawmill was arguably Queensland's first major industrial enterprise. With the establishment of this sawmill, Brisbane became the key local market for timber. William Sim, an experienced timber worker from Nairn, near Inverness in the Scottish Highlands, began working at the Brisbane Saw Mills in August 1854. With Sim in charge, the quality of product improved and production increased.

The first sawmill to be opened in Maryborough was Gladwell and Greathead's Union Sawmill in 1861, which established the city as a timber-getting town. Pettigrew was anxious to retain his monopoly in Queensland and began to explore the Maryborough area, looking for new sources of timber and a site for a sawmill to supply the northern ports of Gladstone, Rockhampton and Bowen. In August 1862, Pettigrew explored the Mary River with Tom Petrie and in October decided on the site for his sawmill - 10 miles (16 km) downriver from Maryborough. On Pettigrew's return to Brisbane, he established a partnership agreement with Sim, who paid £200 for a quarter share in the new firm of Pettigrew and Sim. The new sawmill was called Dundathu and began operating in August 1863.

The Maryborough timber industry industrialised and grew rapidly during the 1860s. In 1876 more timber (mainly sawn pine) was produced in Maryborough than had been exported from Queensland in the preceding 10 years. A number of firms were established including Wilson, Hart and Bartholomew; and James Fairlie. Despite early competition from Gladwell and Greathead's Union Sawmill, Dundathu Sawmill quickly proved profitable, shipping timber to Sydney, Gladstone, Rockhampton and Bowen.

Pettigrew continued to seek out timber resources which could be milled at Dundathu. In September 1863, he set off in the paddle steamer Gneering to search for stands of timber that were reported to exist in the Noosa area. On his return Pettigrew concluded that the timber was disappointing and inaccessible. However, others did not agree and by the end of 1863, timber-getters were operating in the lower Noosa area. Pettigrew turned his attention to the north, and in late June 1865 Pettigrew landed at the head of Tin Can Bay to examine the area further.

His discovery of kauri pine in the Woolann area of north Cooloola provided the main source of timber for the Dundathu Sawmill. By 1865, Pettigrew's men were using bullock teams to drag kauri pine logs from Woolann (the area around Lake Poona). Early timber-getters are recorded as using a corduroy crossing of tea-tree branches and saplings to cross the tidal flats in the northern Cooloola area. Pettigrew's men dragged the logs to the mouth of Seary's Creek, tied them into large rafts and towed them through the Tin Can Bay Inlet, Great Sandy Strait and up the Mary River. Tugs were then used to haul the rafts of timber to Dundathu.

The sandy nature of the terrain and lack of feed for horses and bullocks made the use of draught animals for transport very difficult. Pettigrew needed to develop a more expedient alternative. In July 1865 Pettigrew noted in his diary that 5.5 or 6 miles (8.9 or 9.7 km) of railway, the majority of which would cross flat, "barren" sandy country, would enable the timber to be taken out of inland Cooloola to Tin Can Bay. Pettigrew had previously written to Arthur Macalister-the Minister for Lands and Works-about a railway between his operations on the Maroochy and Mooloolah rivers, and was told that the government would not fund railways, and therefore they must be private. In 1863 Pettigrew had begun to experiment with horse-drawn wagons on timber tramlines in the yard of Dundathu and installed wooden-railed lines and turntables to transport the timber around the large sawmill.

By 1864 Pettigrew had become concerned that the "unbridled competition" permitted by the Timber Regulations was causing quarrels among timber-getters and encouraged over-cutting and waste. Pettigrew wrote to Macalister in April 1864, "setting out arguments for protecting timber-getters who made improvements such as roads for the extraction of timber, but could not then prevent others from using them". In response, Macalister introduced special timber licences in 1864 which gave their holders exclusive rights to cut and remove timber from specified areas where ordinary timber licences did not apply. The Crown Lands Alienation Act 1868 opened up the Noosa area for selection. By April 1869, Pettigrew was concerned that the new selection laws might override his Special Timber Licences and allow selectors to take over his kauri pine forests in northern Cooloola. As a result, he sent Surveyor Byrne to survey his land at Woolann, which became Portions 1 and 2, Parish of Cooloola. On 3 May 1869, Pettigrew applied for the selections in the name of his partner William Sim. By this time, Pettigrew had lost the best timber at Noosa, the Kin Kin Creek timber, to merchants and sawmillers McGhie, Luya and Co who established the Elanda Point Sawmill.

The forests of Cooloola were physically difficult to exploit and remote from the settlements at Brisbane, Maryborough and Gympie, however, the extent and quality of the resource first attracted independent cutters and later sawmillers to the area. Sawmillers operating in the area included Wilson, Hart and Co. of Maryborough; Hyne and Son of Maryborough; Ramsay and Co. of Mungar, Ferguson and Co. of Gympie; and Dath, Henderson and Co. of Tewantin. However, the 2 firms that dominated the trade in Cooloola were Pettigrew and Sim at Tin Can Inlet in the north, and McGhie, Luya and Co. on the Noosa River in the south. After the Gympie gold rush of 1867, demand for timber increased exponentially and the timber industries of Maryborough and Cooloola boomed.

In October 1872, Pettigrew and Sim arrived at Cooloola and began surveying a route for a tramway. By this time their men were extracting timber from Thannae Scrub (located to the south of Woolann), and taking it out through Cooloola Creek. Pettigrew located a suitable terminus on Cooloola Creek and commenced surveying a tramway towards Thannae Scrub. Its construction was underway by January 1873. Pettigrew planned the technical details of the line and ordered materials, and Sim supervised the laying of the track. Sim contributed some of the funds for the tramway by purchasing a further quarter-share in Pettigrew and Sim for £3,750 in September 1871.

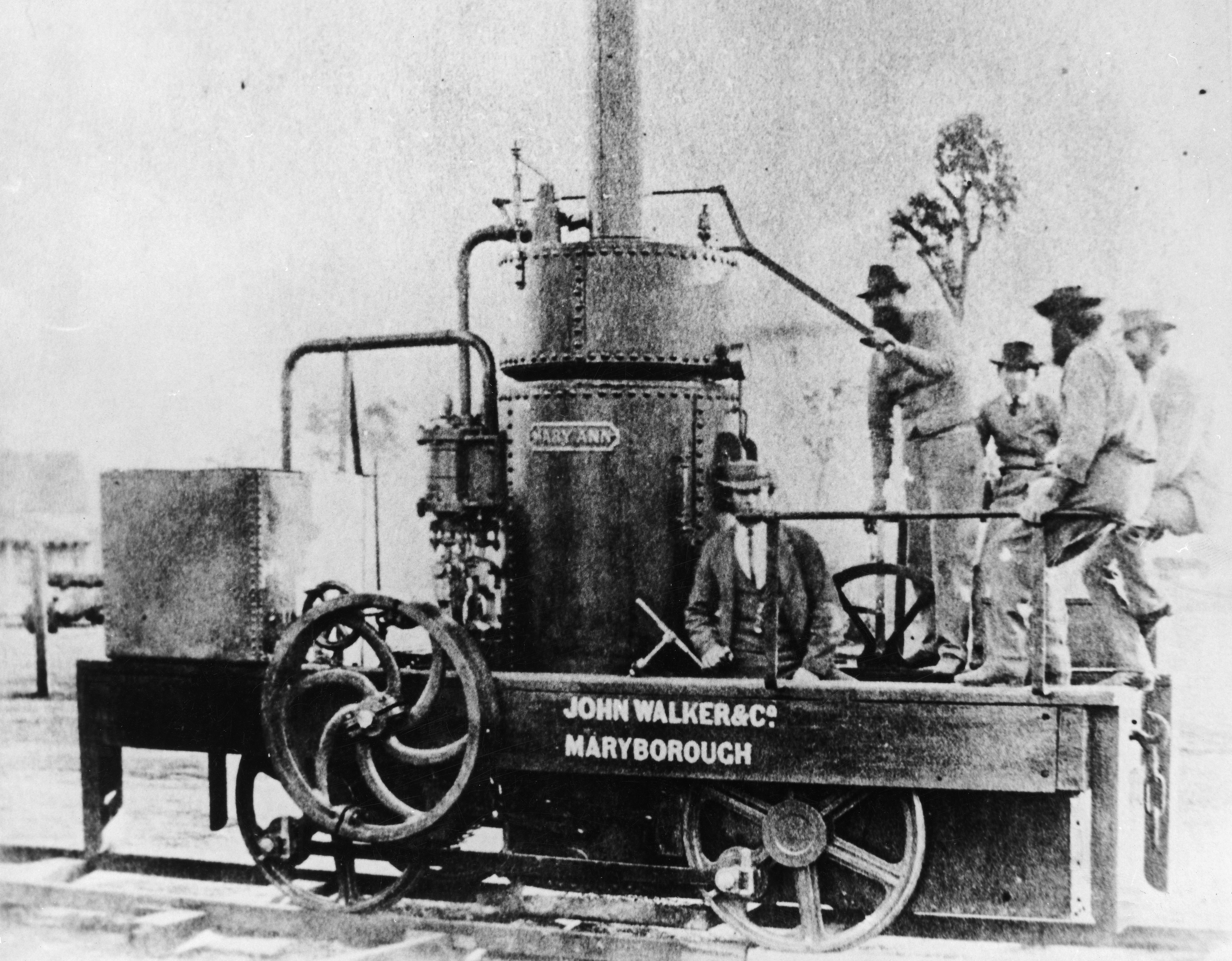
"Mary Ann", first locomotive on the Cooloola Tramway, first locomotive built by Walkers Limited, first locomotive built in Queensland, circa 1875

The locomotive for the tramway was built especially for the line by John Walker and Co of Maryborough. According to Pettigrew, it was "the first locomotive built in Queensland". The locomotive was named "Mary Ann" after the daughters of Sim and Pettigrew: Mary Ann Sim, born 21 February 1856, and Mary Ann Pettigrew, born 25 December 1865. The design of the engine was described as: "... a compact little affair, of peculiar make, the cylinder, boiler, and working parts being upright, not horizontal, as in most ordinary locomotives. The reason for this arrangement is found in the necessity for placing the wheels at as short a distance from each other as possible in order to admit of the locomotive working smoothly round the sharp curves that must necessarily occur on a line rudely laid down in an unsettled and often rough country".

The locomotive made a test run on wooden rails laid down Bowen Street on 30 June 1873. According to the Maryborough Chronicle "many of the inhabitants, both old and young, spent a pleasant hour in riding to and fro on the novel conveyance". Pettigrew was proud of their accomplishment and ordered 7 copies of a photograph of the engine, sending them with explanatory letters to: Governor Normanby, the Minister for Works; the editor of The Courier; politician Charles Lilley; journalist Theophilus Parsons Pugh; architect FGD Stanley and engineer John Sinclair. After the trials the "Mary Ann" was immediately shipped to Tin Can Bay.

In July 1873 Pettigrew joined Sim to inspect progress and try out the "Mary Ann" on the tramway. The rails were sawn at Maryborough, and taken by steamer to the tramway. The "Mary Ann" itself was used to saw the Cypress pine sleepers for the tramway as the line progressed. Pettigrew explained the process in his letter to the Governor dated 5 August 1873:

It is now at work preparing its line from Thannae to Tin Can Bay. On side of framing is seen a pulley. This is for driving a circular saw bench for cutting up the sleepers. The bench is mounted on two trucks, and is taken along the line as required...The country is barren sandy ground, and the line...is over pretty even ground, requiring no cutting or banking at least as far as yet made. Steepest gradient is about 1 in 18. Gauge 3 ft 3 in; rails are off spotted gum 4" x 3" but are found to be rather light for weight of engine which is about 6 tons. They are now being made of 4½" x 3". The cross sleepers are of Cypress pine 7" x 4½" and are notched to receive the rails, and are fastened together by wedges....The ends of the rails require to be bolted or pegged to sleepers but has not yet been done. We estimate that the engine will be able to bring 400 cubic feet of Dundathu pine logs at a trip and at a speed of from 6 to 8 miles per house. The two miles already laid has cost about £200 per mile.

The line was opened on 29 October 1873 after 3.5 miles (5.6 km) had been laid. An official opening and celebratory picnic hosted by the Sim family was held on 30 October with a number of Maryborough's leading citizens attending. Guests travelled up and down the line and were given a parbuckling demonstration (the lifting of timber onto the train). Pettigrew could not attend, but Sim told the gathering that "Mr Pettigrew was at one with him in all these works".

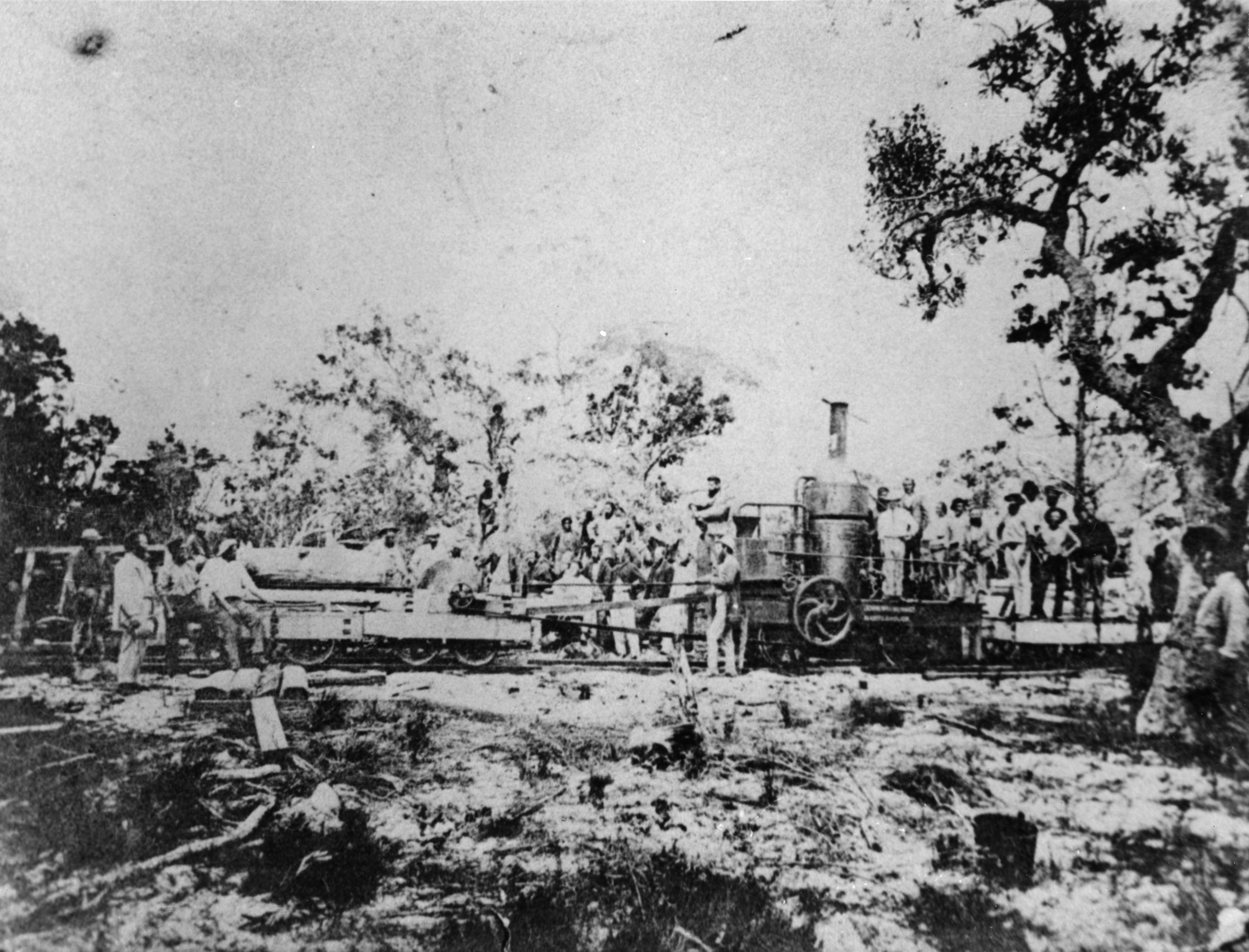
Workers standing on the Mary Ann, 1875

Pettigrew's tramway was Queensland's first major private railway. According to Kerr "the early adoption of tramways for hauling logs, and its influence on the development on the railways system in Queensland, centres on one man, William Pettigrew". The success of the Cooloola Tramway in drawing logs from inaccessible places and over difficult terrain encouraged other sawmillers to build light tramways. For example, in the mid-1870s McGhie, Luya and Co. constructed a tramway system across their property on Lake Cootharaba to their sawmill at Mill Point to overcome swampy, low-lying and poorly drained ground conditions. Pettigrew's influence on railways spread beyond the Cooloola area. In 1874 and 1879, he provided advice on the construction and use of tramways. He used his own tramway to demonstrate that a railway could be built for less than £1000 per mile; only a fraction of the cost of government railways, and critics began to condemn government extravagance. The fact that Pettigrew's and other private tramways were never designed to perform the haulage tasks required of government railways was not mentioned by the critics, however the cheap construction of the former did force a reduction in Government standards.

Less than 3 weeks after the opening of the Cooloola tramway, William Sim was killed. Sim and a man named Cooper were unloading a log 5 feet (1.5 m) in diameter when the log fell off the truck before the men were ready and crushed Sim. Cooper was injured but not killed. According to the Maryborough Chronicle, William Sim was "one who has, in no small degree, contributed towards raising Maryborough to its present position of industrial and commercial prosperity". Pettigrew's close relationship with Sim is evident in a statement he made in 1900: "Till I got William Sim, nothing worth speaking of was done".

After the death of William Sim, Pettigrew continued an association with the Sim family, and the Maryborough firm became known as Pettigrew and Company. During the late 1870s and early 1880s, Pettigrew's Maryborough interests were managed by William Menzies (the husband of Mary Ann Sim) and William Sim's sons; James Sim Tertius and William Simpson Sim. As time passed, members of the Sim family increased their shareholdings in the firm Pettigrew and Co., until they owned more than two-thirds of the business.

William Sim's death and the destruction of the Brisbane Saw Mill by fire for the second time in 1874 postponed extensions to the Cooloola Tramway. At the time of Sim's death a little over half of the planned 7 miles (11 km) tramway had been constructed, however, on 25 May 1875 Pettigrew ordered 2 long tons (2.0 t) of 23 pounds (10 kg) railway iron from Smellie and Co which was enough for approximately 100 yards (91 m) of rail. The planned extension of the tramway was in 2 directions: from the inland terminus (near what later became the site of the Forestry Department's Camp Milo) to a new terminus in the Broutha Scrub; and 1 mile (1.6 km) from Cooloola Creek (the original coastal terminus) north-west to a new coastal terminus at Poverty Point.

In late October 1875, Pettigrew began to survey the extension from the first inland terminus into the Broutha Scrub. On a survey map dated 1876, timber-getter camps are recorded at the Broutha and Thannae waterholes with several structures relating to these camps. The Broutha and Thannae scrubs lay within a 1000-acre selection, Portion 274, which was held in the name of William Sim. Pettigrew carried out surveys and James Sim Tertius supervised the laying of the track. In November 1875, Pettigrew negotiated with Walker and Co for a second locomotive for £550, and a boiler (6 by 3 feet (1.83 m × 0.91 m)) for £22 (which may have been used to operate the winding engine). The new engine was called Dundathu and began running on 21 September 1876. The design of the locomotive Dundathu differed to the Mary Ann in that it had a neat cab with iron stanchions and a corrugated roof which protected the driver from all weather. All the gearing for starting, braking and reversing the locomotive were connected so as to be immediately under the driver's hand.

Pettigrew had to overcome a number of obstacles in the construction of the tramway extension. Blocking the planned route were 2 ridges to the east of the original inland terminus and a third ridge which led into "the hollow" (or Broutha Scrub). To overcome the first 2 ridges, Pettigrew cut 2 steep-sided passes through them and filled the gully between them with the sand removed from the cuts, to ensure a gentle gradient. This formation was the only substantial earthworks carried out by Pettigrew on the route of the railway. The third ridge rose steeply over 200 ft (61 m) to a height of 484 ft (148 m), followed by a descent of 182 ft (55 m) into Thannae Scrub. After persistent survey work, Pettigrew decided on 20 November 1876 to abandon the attempt to survey a conventional line down into the Broutha Scrub and opted for a balanced incline tramway. This entailed positioning a stationary winding engine on the top of the ridge. The tramway track came up the ridge on a side cut, crossed it and ran down into the Broutha Scrub on an embankment. A loaded wagon was kept on top of the ridge at all times so that "the effort of raising the loaded wagons, one at a time, was counter-balanced by the weight of the descending wagon", creating 2 isolated systems for locomotive purposes. The "Mary Ann" was used within Broutha Scrub to haul loaded wagons to the foot of the ridge, and the "Dundathu" took them from the other side of the ridge to the coast. The railway line was completed to its final inland terminus past Broutha Scrub in 1878.

The residence of Robert Black, who managed Pettigrew and Sim's Cooloola operations, was located behind the Cooloola Creek landing place. It is likely that other timber-getters or workers on the line may have had residences within this area. A sawmill named "Kaloola" was constructed along the line. It was erected for the purpose of sawing up hardwood, principally for renewing the rails, consisted of a shed which measured 60 by 30 ft (18.3 by 9.1 m), and was described as high and airy and roofed with sheet iron. A windmill was installed at the site of the sawmill to water the engine. The water used for this purpose was pumped from a waterhole.

In July 1877, Pettigrew went with James Sim Tertius to the Cooloola Railway and surveyed the coastward extension. The original terminus on the eastern bank of Cooloola Creek was proving unsatisfactory, and Sim decided to extend the line across the creek and north-west to Poverty Point. The completed line was 8 to 9 miles (13 to 14 km) long.

In 1874, Pettigrew told the Tramways Select Committee that he expected his tramway to last at least 10 years. Ten years later the operation did cease, and in March 1884, Pettigrew paid 2 final visits to the tramway and the timber-getters' camps at Broutha and Thannae waterholes. With the closure of the Cooloola tramway and increased competition from the other Maryborough sawmills, Dundathu lost the pre-eminence it had held since the 1860s. The locomotives "Mary Ann" and "Dundathu" and the stationary steam engine were sent back to Dundathu Sawmill and put up for sale. Pettigrew notes in his diary in March 1884 that 2 locomotives of 3 ft 3 in (99 cm) gauge were up for sale, as well as truck wheels, axles, a windmill and pump, wheels and pinion. The engines were not sold, possibly due to their unusual gauge, and in January 1885 it was reported that the engines were being held in a shed at Dundathu.

During the 1890s the timber industry in Cooloola entered a period of decline. As a result of the competitive and aggressive extraction of timber, the resource became depleted and most of the timber-getters and sawmillers were leaving the area. In the late nineteenth century, William Pettigrew, Richard Hyne and Abraham Luya spoke in the Queensland Parliament about the need for forest conservation. Although parts of Cooloola had been gazetted as Timber Reserves from the mid- 1880s, it was not until the State Forests and National Parks Act 1906 created the Queensland Forest Service that proper forest management was employed.

The Dundathu Sawmill was damaged in the February floods of 1893 and then completely destroyed by fire in December the same year. The combination of the Brisbane floods in 1893 and 1898, the destruction of the Brisbane Saw Mills in 1874 and the Dundathu Sawmill by fire in 1893, and the enveloping economic depression brought Pettigrew's sawmilling empire to an end. On 26 July 1898 Pettigrew signed a petition of insolvency. Pettigrew died in Bowen on 28 October 1906 owning few assets. The obituaries described Pettigrew as "the pioneer sawmiller of Queensland" and the "father of the Queensland timber industry".

Pettigrew's contribution to Queensland extended beyond his influence on the timber industry. He served as an Alderman on the Brisbane Municipal Council from 1863–66, 1868–73 and 1878–85 as Mayor of Brisbane in 1870–71; as a member of the first Caboolture Divisional Board from 1880–83 (being Chairman in 1881), and was appointed to the Queensland Legislative Council in 1877 (resigning in 1894). Pettigrew was also a member of various boards, including the North Brisbane School of Arts, the National (Agricultural and Industrial) Association and the Philosophical Society (Royal Society from 1883) of Queensland, and boards of health. He was a founder of the Caledonian Association, and a trustee of the Paddington and Toowong cemeteries. Pettigrew was an elder and trustee in Presbyterian congregations and helped to establish a theological college, Divinity Hall, and the Queensland Evangelical Standard newspaper.

In 1912 and 1924 surveyors assessed Cooloola's remaining timber resources, and the extraction of timber (mainly hardwoods) continued. Areas associated with Pettigrew's nineteenth century operations, including the Poverty Point terminus site and the former tramway route were utilized during the twentieth century. The Poverty Point firebreak which is believed to follow the tramway route in part was widened in the 1960s.

In the 1960s a conflict over sand mining, forestry and future development in the region began. In 1970, environmental conservationists successfully fought to preserve Cooloola from sand mining. Queensland Titanium Mines, a subsidiary of American National Lead, was the principal mining company involved in the Cooloola controversy. In 1975, the Cooloola National Park (now the Great Sandy National Park) was gazetted. The western catchment of the Noosa River and the high dunes of northern Cooloola were later added to it.

== Description ==
The Cooloola Tramway is located within the Cooloola Recreation Area, of the Great Sandy National Park, which lies between the coastal towns of Noosa Heads and Rainbow Beach. The first section of the tramway ran from the entrance of Cooloola Creek to a site near the former Forestry Department's Camp Milo. It was later extended into Broutha Scrub and the coastal terminus was changed from Cooloola Creek to Poverty Point.

=== Tramway route ===
The complete route of the tramway is currently unconfirmed.

The tramway route is aligned with the Poverty Point firebreak, located on a slightly elevated ridge, for at least a portion of the firebreak. The site of the sawmill and windmill referred to in an article of Maryborough Chronicle may be located at a depression in the firebreak, just over 1 mile (1.6 km) from the Cooloola Creek terminus site. It is believed the windmill was located near the low-lying swampy area north of the Poverty Point firebreak, and the sawmill on the high ground south of the firebreak. Several stumps (possibly building stumps) have previously been located to the south-west of the firebreak, potentially marking the sawmill site.

A route thought to be the continuance of the tramway begins east of the termination of the Poverty Point firebreak at Rainbow Beach Road and continues through vegetation to the entrance of the Eastern Firebreak (Pettigrew's Road). The route is particularly discernible in certain sections due to a clearly visible depression along the firebreak; the absence of regrowth along the track, and the way in which surrounding trees have arched over the track. Other portions of the route are harder to identify, with heavy regrowth and fallen branches. This route provides a smooth and direct line for the tramway from where it would have crossed Rainbow Beach Road to the Camp Milo area, the location of the first inland tramway terminus prior to its extension into the Broutha Scrub.

Following the eastern firebreak past the site of Camp Milo, a series of cuttings and an embankment are evident. The presence of these features indicates that this portion of the firebreak aligns with Pettigrew's tramway route. It has been used as a road since the tramway closed and the engineering features are still very recognisable. Along the cuttings, the firebreak track is 3.3 metres (11 ft) wide. The portion of embankment is 4.9 metres (16 ft) wide with a slope of 9.5 metres (31 ft) at an angle of 45 degrees. The height of the embankment is approximately 5 metres (16 ft). Beyond the cuttings and an embankment, the firebreak heads down into a more densely forested area.

The tramway line is believed to have deviated from the Eastern firebreak at some point after the cuttings, as the firebreak becomes winding and steep and not suitable for the course of a tramway. A likely deviation of the tramway from the firebreak is located approximately halfway between Camp Milo and the site of the stationary winding engine. This route would have continued through the scrub, eventually climbing the incline and crossing the eastern firebreak to stationary winding engine. A route is clearly visible through the scrub with trees having grown around the track.

At the top of the ridge above Broutha Scrub is the original site of the stationary winding engine. It is marked by a sign with the words "Site of steam engine and winch". The remains of this operation, including large bedlogs and metal fittings, are buried here.

=== Broutha Scrub ===
From the site of the stationary winding engine, the tramway descended south-east into Broutha Scrub. The tramway route into the scrub is still visible as an embankment approximately 4 metres (13 ft) wide. This continues into Broutha Scrub to the tramway's second inland terminus.

Investigations in Broutha Scrub have identified some wooden rails of the line still intact and in-situ, used to identify where the route of the tramway through the scrub ran. Other artefacts previously found within this area include bolts, a broken wheel, a grease tin and a knife.

=== Poverty Point ===
At Poverty Point, the site of the second coastal terminus, are the remains of a set of timber skids. Sawn logs were offloaded from the trams and rolled along these skids out into the bay for rafting. These skids are likely to relate to the later Hyne and Son timber-getting operation but may also overlay Pettigrew's use of the site. The eastern section of the skids is located on higher land towards the scrub. Substantially submerged, the lengths of three sizable logs are still visible, orientated from south-west to north-east. The south- western extent of the skids is the most exposed due to grading of this area by a 4WD track. The log lengths vary the northern log is 26 metres (85 ft) long; the middle log is 23.3 metres (76 ft); and the southern one is 3.6 metres (12 ft). The visible extent of the southern log is much shorter than the other two and is almost completely submerged under vegetation. The logs run almost parallel to each other with a variation of less than 5 degrees. The distance between the northern and middle logs is 2.4 and 2.69 metres (7 ft 10 in and 8 ft 10 in) between the middle and southern ones. The mean diameter of the logs is 33 centimetres (13 in).

The western section of the skids is located within the intertidal zone. Nine logs, predominantly orientated at 230 degrees towards the bay, were visible at low tide. Only a small portion of these intertidal logs are visible above the sand and it is likely they extend even further into Tin Can Bay.

=== Cooloola Creek ===
A timber bridge is located at the point where the Poverty Point firebreak crosses Cooloola Creek. The bridge has been constructed with 4 layers of logs. The top layer has 6 longitudinal log beams; the second layer consists of 2; the third layer consists of 2 cross beams; and the fourth layer consists of 2 longitudinal log beams. The bridge measures 8.6 by 3.7 metres (28 ft × 12 ft). No bolts have been used in its construction; it appears to have been repaired over time. While this bridge would have been used by bullock teams post-dating Pettigrew's operation, the lower layers of the bridge, earthworks and inlaid timber on either side of the crossing may comprise part of a crossing used by Pettigrew and Sim.

Just north of the Cooloola Creek timber bridge, a likely deviation of the tramway leading to Poverty Point has previously been identified, evident as a distinct cutting that follows an orientation of 280 degrees.

The first tramway terminus site is located on the northern bank of Cooloola Creek. One cross beam, positioned against the bank, with 2 logs running perpendicular to it, relates to the use of this site as a terminus. A narrow strip of higher ground which extends to the east of the bank has previously been identified as a possible route for the tramway from the terminus site.

=== Tin Can Bay Inlet (between North Cooloola Point and Cameron Point) ===
A corduroy crossing is located within a north facing inlet of Tin Can Bay. Its location and orientation suggests it would have provided access to the Seary's Creek rafting ground. A series of logs have been laid parallel to each other, in a north-south orientation, each approximately 3 metres (9.8 ft) long, to create the crossing which is 90 metres (300 ft) in length. Some sections of the crossing remain intact with logs 10 centimetres (3.9 in) apart.

Immediately north of the corduroy crossing is a feature previously identified as a wagon. All that remains are 2 sawn pieces of timber, approximately 32 centimetres (13 in) at their widest point, partially submerged, with only 25 centimetres (9.8 in) of the feature exposed above the ground. The feature is 1.94 metres (6 ft 4 in) long. The western of the 2 pieces of timber has an iron bolt through it.

Beyond the purported "wagon" are 2 wheels (previously identified as wagon wheels). Both are submerged in the sand, however the diameter of the first wheel (the northernmost of the two) could be discerned as 2.1 metres (6 ft 11 in). The second wheel is located 60 centimetres (24 in) from the first.

The corduroy crossing may have been re-laid over time and as such surviving remnants may relate to Pettigrew's operation or a later timber-getting operation.

=== Seary's Creek ===
The feature identified previously as a rafting ground is located on the northern foreshore of Seary's Creek. Fourteen hardwood logs are laid out from the bank into the creek. Unlike the skids identified at Poverty Point, this ramp features logs running perpendicular to each other, orientated in either a north-east to south-west or north-west to south-east direction. The north-east to south-west logs run perpendicular to the shore, towards the creek. The north-west to south-east logs have been positioned under the more inland set of north-east to south-west logs. It appears that this has been done to add height to the inland section of the ramp, enabling sawn logs to better slide down into Seary's Creek.

Along the north-western extent of this feature, the timber orientated north-west to south-east terminates with a stepped cut, allowing a log to sit securely underneath.

The rafting ground may have been re-laid over time and surviving remnants may relate to Pettigrew's operation or a later timber-getting operation.

== Heritage listing ==
The Cooloola Tramway was listed on the Queensland Heritage Register on 12 July 2013 having satisfied the following criteria.

The place is important in demonstrating the evolution or pattern of Queensland's history.

The tramway is important in demonstrating the early expansion of Queensland's timber industry and the development of private railways in the State in the late nineteenth century.

The Wide Bay-Burnett region was historically one of Queensland's most important timber producing regions. The remains of the Seary's Creek rafting ground and related corduroy crossing, and the Cooloola tramway provide rare surviving evidence of the earliest period of the timber industry in this region.

The Cooloola tramway constructed by Pettigrew and Sim, in operation from 1873 to 1884, was the first major private railway in Queensland. Its success encouraged other timber-getting operations to use tramways to access remote timber resources and influenced the Queensland Government's construction of cheaper railways.

The place has potential to yield information that will contribute to an understanding of Queensland's history.

The ephemeral nature of extraction activities and regrowth of vegetation has left little apparent evidence of timber-getters' activities during the earliest period of the timber industry in Queensland. Archaeological investigation into the tramway has the potential to reveal important information that will contribute to our understanding of the development of Queensland's timber industry.

Further investigations into the tramway may help determine the exact route, construction and operation of the tramway. Sub-surface investigations have previously revealed artefacts relating to the operation of the line.

Archaeological investigation may also reveal material relating to the camps and settlement which were established in relation to the tramway. This material has the potential to contribute to our understanding of the organisation and domestic life of remote timber settlements that existed in late nineteenth century Queensland.

The place is important because of its aesthetic significance.

The tramway has strong aesthetic values derived from a picturesque setting incorporating beaches, inlets, creeks, scrubs and forests. Remaining evidence of the tramway set against the otherwise natural environment, elicits an appreciation of the tenacity required to construct the tramway in such a remote area and across such inhospitable terrain.

The place has a special association with the life or work of a particular person, group or organisation of importance in Queensland's history.

The tramway has a special association with William Pettigrew. Under the business partnership of Pettigrew and Sim, the tramway was constructed to supply timber to their Maryborough sawmill Dundathu. While the influence of Sim occurred mainly in the Maryborough area, Pettigrew made an important contribution to the development of the state's timber industry, and in turn the economic development of Queensland.

Pettigrew, an important and influential pioneer of the Queensland timber industry, established Brisbane's first steam sawmill and conducted extensive timber-getting and processing operations between Brisbane and Maryborough during the colonial period.

== See also ==
- List of tramways in Queensland
