= Wide Bay Military Reserve =

- Location within Queensland
- 25.8733°S 152.9348°E
- Location: Tin Can Bay Road, Tin Can Bay, Queensland, Australia

Commonwealth Heritage List
- Official name: Wide Bay Military Reserve
- Type: Listed place (Natural)
- Designated: 22 June 2004
- Reference no.: 105285

Wide Bay Military Reserve is a heritage-listed military installation at Tin Can Bay Road, Tin Can Bay, Queensland, Australia. The reserve supports a diverse range of plant communities from estuarine, strand (including coastal marshes and pockets of rainforest), wetlands, heath, tall shrublands and woodlands, to the open forests of the sub-coastal hills and ranges. The total number of bird species recorded for the place totals 250, which is high by Australian standards. It was added to the Australian Commonwealth Heritage List on 22 June 2004.

== History ==
The Wide Bay area is a military training area and has been used intensively by artillery regiments and infantry battalions employing armoured vehicles.

== Description ==
Wide Bay Military Reserve is approximately 22,300 ha (55,000 acres), 1 km (0.62 mi) north-west of Tin Can Bay. It forms a continuum of natural environment with K'gari and the Cooloola National Park.

The Wide Bay area is the northernmost extension of the Cooloola sand dune mass, deposited intermittently with changing sea levels, over the last 150,000 years. The oldest dunes, in the central portion of the Wide Bay area, have been weathered and partially inundated to form a low lying undulating landscape. The soils here are shallow, sandy and low in nutrients and overlie heavy clay. Drainage is therefore slow, the water table is consistently close to the surface, and marshes and bogs are common. These wetter areas are known as wallum, and are dominated by open sedgeland and Banksia heathland, which grade into patchy forests and woodland on the upper dune slopes and crests. Common forest and woodland trees are white mahogany (Eucalyptus umbra), pinkwood (Eucalyptus internmedia) and broad leaved paper-bark (Melaleuca quinquenervia). Major heath species include Acacia ulicifolia, Banksia aemula, Banksia robur, Melaleuca juniperinum and Leucopogon pedicellatus. Sedges form the dominant understorey plant of the forests and woodlands.

The old dunes are underlain by coarse grained Triassic (200 million year old) sandstones which outcrop in the western section of the Wide Bay area in the form of dissected ridges of moderate relief. The steep slopes and crests support tall open forests, in which smooth-barked apple (Angophora costata), turpentine (Syncarpia glomulifera), ironbark (Eucalyptus crebra), forest oak (Casuarina torulosa) and black oak (Casuarina littoralis) are dominant. The yellow tailed black cockatoo (Calyptorhynchus funereusis) is common in the forest and black oak stands.

The eastern section of the Wide Bay area consists of recent dunes less than 10,000 years old and tidal channels and flats. Salt pans, support water couch (Sporobolus viginicus), occur where tidal cover is very shallow and surface evaporation high. On higher ground surrounding the saltflats, are open forest of swamp she-oak (Casuarina glauca), Moreton Bay ash (Eucalyptus tessellaris), blue gum (Eucalyptus tereticornis) and cabbage tree palm (Livistonia australis). Mangroves occur on the estuarine and sea-birds and waders such as the Caspian tern (Hydroprogne caspia), eastern reef egret (Egretta sacrea), ibis (Threskiornis aethiopica, Threskiornis spinicollis) and spoonbill (Platalea regia). During the summer this area is an important overwintering site of migrant waders from the Northern Hemisphere. The relatively young dunes of this area support species include piccabeen palms (Archontophoenix cunninghamiana), coast sypress (Callitris columellaria) and brushbox (Lophostemon confertus).

The seaward side of the Wide Bay Area is continuous with the Great Sandy Strait region, which is heritage-listed in its own right.

=== Condition ===
As at 1988, the area was in good to excellent condition; however some areas have been disturbed by military exercises within the training areas, and at the settlement at Camp Kerr. Most disturbance appears to be along and bordering ridgetop roads, which are used for tank exercises. CSIRO monitors disturbance and revegetation following such exercises to minimise impacts, and to develop "no go" rules following periods of rainfall. The reserve is noted for being relatively weed free with only minor infestations of Lantana and groundsel (Baccharis hamilifolia), both of which are rampant in many other areas throughout the region. Some exotic cover crops are used by the army to minimise soil erosion following exercises but these have not as yet become invasive. There has been some logging of Callitris columellaris from accessible areas but good stands of Callitris columellaris and Lophostemon suaveolons are found within the area.

== Heritage listing ==
The Wide Bay Military Reserve supports a diverse range of plant communities from estuarine, strand (including coastal marshes and pockets of rainforest), wetlands, heath, tall shrublands and woodlands, to the open forests of the sub-coastal hills and ranges. The place contains a representative example of the coastal lowland complex known as "wallum". The patches of coastal rainforest are a valuable remnant of a formerly more widespread vegetation complex. Wide Bay represents the northern and southern range limits for a number of flora and fauna species. The place provides an important refuge for palaearctic migrant birds, including several identified in the Japan Australia migratory bird agreement. The intertidal areas are an integral part of the Great Sandy Strait, which is one of the most important wader habitats in Queensland. The total number of bird species recorded for the place totals 250, which is high by Australian standards. The reserve provides important habitat for the Ground Parrot, (Pezoporus wallicus), which is endangered in Queensland.

Wide Bay Military Reserve was listed on the Australian Commonwealth Heritage List on 22 June 2004 having satisfied the following criteria.

Criterion A: Processes

Tin Can Inlet includes mangrove species near their southern range limit including Aegialitis annulata and Osbornia octodonta. Wide Bay represents the most northerly occurrence of the yellow form of Christmas Bells (Blandfordia grandiflora) on the mainland. The area supports one of the few remaining strongholds for the species in Queensland. A significant southern extension of the known range of the Fairy Gerygone, Gerygone palpebrosa, is found in the transitional open forests.

Criterion B: Rarity

The heathlands of Wide Bay are the major Queensland habitat of the Ground Parrot, Pezoporus wallicus, which is endangered in Queensland. The area supports a significantly high population density of this species. Patches of coastal rainforest in the far north-east of the area are a valuable remnant of a once widespread coastal vegetation complex.

Criterion D: Characteristic values

The Wide Bay area contains a representative example in good condition of the coastal lowland complex described by Coaldrake (1961) and known as "Wallum". Coaldrake identified 20 landscapes within this complex remaining on the coastal lowland between Gladstone and Brisbane. Wide Bay contains a major proportion of the "Tin Can" landscape, and as such represents the most significant example of this particular landscape.

Vegetation communities within the area are of high integrity and diversity, and include closed to open forests, woodlands, heath species with shrubs and low trees with Wallum indicator species such as Banksia aemula, and B.robur, and littoral vegetation. Communities are relatively undisturbed, with only two significant weed species occurring away from areas of human settlement.

Communities of particular interest include: the estuarine/littoral vegetation sequence, representative of much of the coastal region of south-east Queensland, with mangrove forests, exposed salt pans, coastal marshes, and tea-tree swamps; and the coastal dune rainforest complex which has remained in unusually good condition due to its relative inaccessibility; the rainforest represents a complex that was once widespread along the Queensland coast.
