= Cooloola Cove, Queensland =

Cooloola Cove
- Suburb
- Interactive map of Cooloola Cove
- Coordinates: 25.9805°S 152.9944°E
- Country: Australia
- State: Queensland
- LGA: Gympie Region
- Location: 7.2 km (4.5 mi) S of Tin Can Bay; 52.1 km (32.4 mi) NE of Gympie; 228 km (142 mi) N of Brisbane

Government
  - State electorate: Gympie
  - Federal division: Wide Bay

Area
  - Total: 14.8 km^{2} (5.7 sq mi)
- Elevation: 13 m (43 ft)

Population
  - Total: 2,921 (2021 census)
  - Density: 197.4/km^{2} (511.2/sq mi)
- Time zone: UTC+10:00 (AEST)
- Postcode: 4580
Suburbs around Cooloola Cove
Tin Can Bay	Tin Can Bay	Cooloola
Toolara Forest	Cooloola Cove	Cooloola
Toolara Forest	Cooloola	Cooloola

Cooloola Cove is a coastal locality in the Gympie Region, Queensland, Australia. In the 2021 census, Cooloola Cove had a population of 2,921 people.

== Geography ==
Cooloola Cove is in the Wide Bay-Burnett region, 219 kilometers or a two-and-a-half-hour drive north of the state capital Brisbane and a 52-kilometre or half-hour drive from the Council Seat and city, Gympie.

== History ==
The Veterans Memorial Wall was unveiled on Saturday 11 November 2006 and commemorates those who served in the Vietnam War.

== Demographics ==
In the 2011 census, Cooloola Cove had a population of 2,513 people.

In the 2016 census, Cooloola Cove had a population of 2,633 people.

In the 2021 census, Cooloola Cove had a population of 2,921 people.

== Education ==
There are no schools in Cooloola Cove. The nearest government school is Tin Can Bay State School in neighbouring Tin Can Bay to the north; it provides primary schooling and secondary schooling to Year 10. For secondary schooling to Year 12, the nearest government school is Gympie State High School in Gympie to the south-west.

== Amenities ==
The Veterans & Community Hall is on the corner of Nautilus Drive and Santa Maria Court (25.9709°S 152.9851°E). There is a memorial wall for veterans of the Vietnam War.

Cooloola Wesleyan Methodist Church meets at the Veterans & Community Hall. It is part of the Wesleyan Methodist Church of Australia.

Centenary of Federation Park is in Mauretania Avenue (25.9680°S 152.9767°E). Barbeques are available.
