= Toolara Forest, Queensland =

Toolara Forest
- Suburb
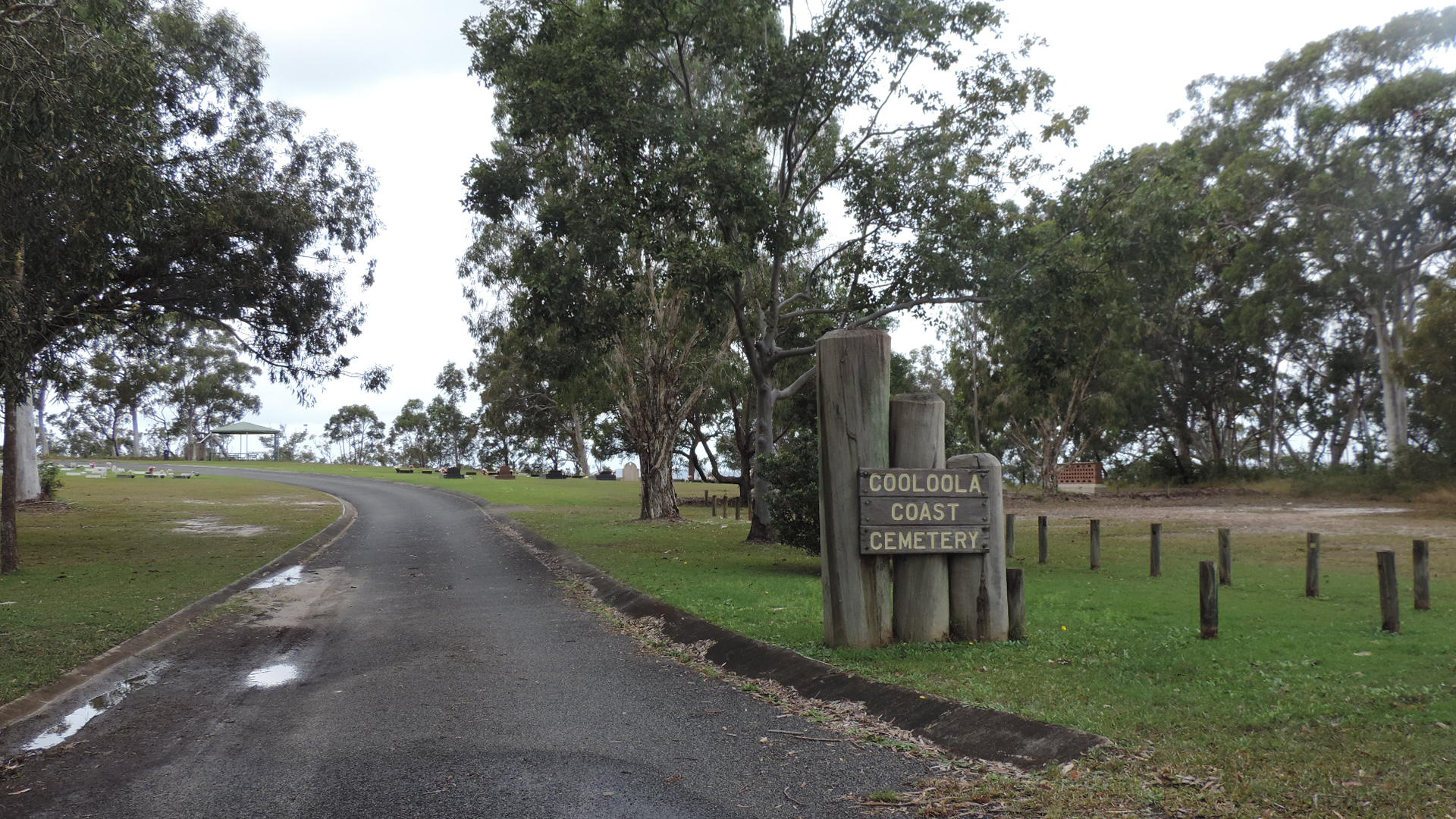
- Entrance to Cooloola Coast Cemetery, 2016

- Interactive map of Toolara Forest
- Coordinates: 25.9916°S 152.8500°E
- Country: Australia
- State: Queensland
- LGAs: Gympie Region; Fraser Coast Region
- Location: 32.6 km (20.3 mi) NE of Gympie; 66.8 km (41.5 mi) SSE of Maryborough; 97.7 km (60.7 mi) S of Hervey Bay; 204 km (127 mi) N of Brisbane

Government
  - State electorate: Gympie
  - Federal division: Wide Bay

Area
  - Total: 399.8 km^{2} (154.4 sq mi)

Population
  - Total: 0 (2021 census)
  - Density: 0.0000/km^{2} (0.000/sq mi)
- Time zone: UTC+10:00 (AEST)
- Postcode: 4570
Suburbs around Toolara Forest
Neerdie	Tuan Forest	Tin Can Bay; Wallu
Kia Ora	Toolara Forest	Cooloola Cove; Cooloola
Goomboorian; Wolvi	Coondoo	Como

Toolara Forest is a rural locality split between Gympie Region and Fraser Coast Region, Queensland, Australia. In the 2021 census, Toolara Forest had "no people or a very low population".

== Geography ==
The locality of Toolara Forest is mostly in the Gympie Region with only two small northern parts of the locality in the Fraser Coast Region.

Tin Can Bay Road (from Gympie to Tin Can Bay) enters the south-west of the locality from Goomboorian and Kia Ora and exits in the north-east of the locality into Wallu and then to Tin Can Bay. In the north-east there are two road junctions off Tin Can Bay; the Maryborough-Cooloola Road heads north-west towards Maryborough via Tuan Forest, while the Rainbow Beach Road heads south-east via Cooloola to Rainbow Beach on the Pacific Ocean coast.

The land use is almost entirely dedicated to the Toolara State Forest with the exception of a narrow strip of land in the east of the locality bounded by Rainbow Beach Road which contains the Cooloola Coast Cemetery and the remainder is a small part of the Great Sandy National Park which is mostly in the neighbouring locality of Cooloola. There is no residential land.

== Demographics ==
In the 2016 census, Toolara Forest had "no people or a very low population".

In the 2021 census, Toolara Forest had "no people or a very low population".
