= Tin Can Bay, Queensland =

Tin Can Bay
- Town
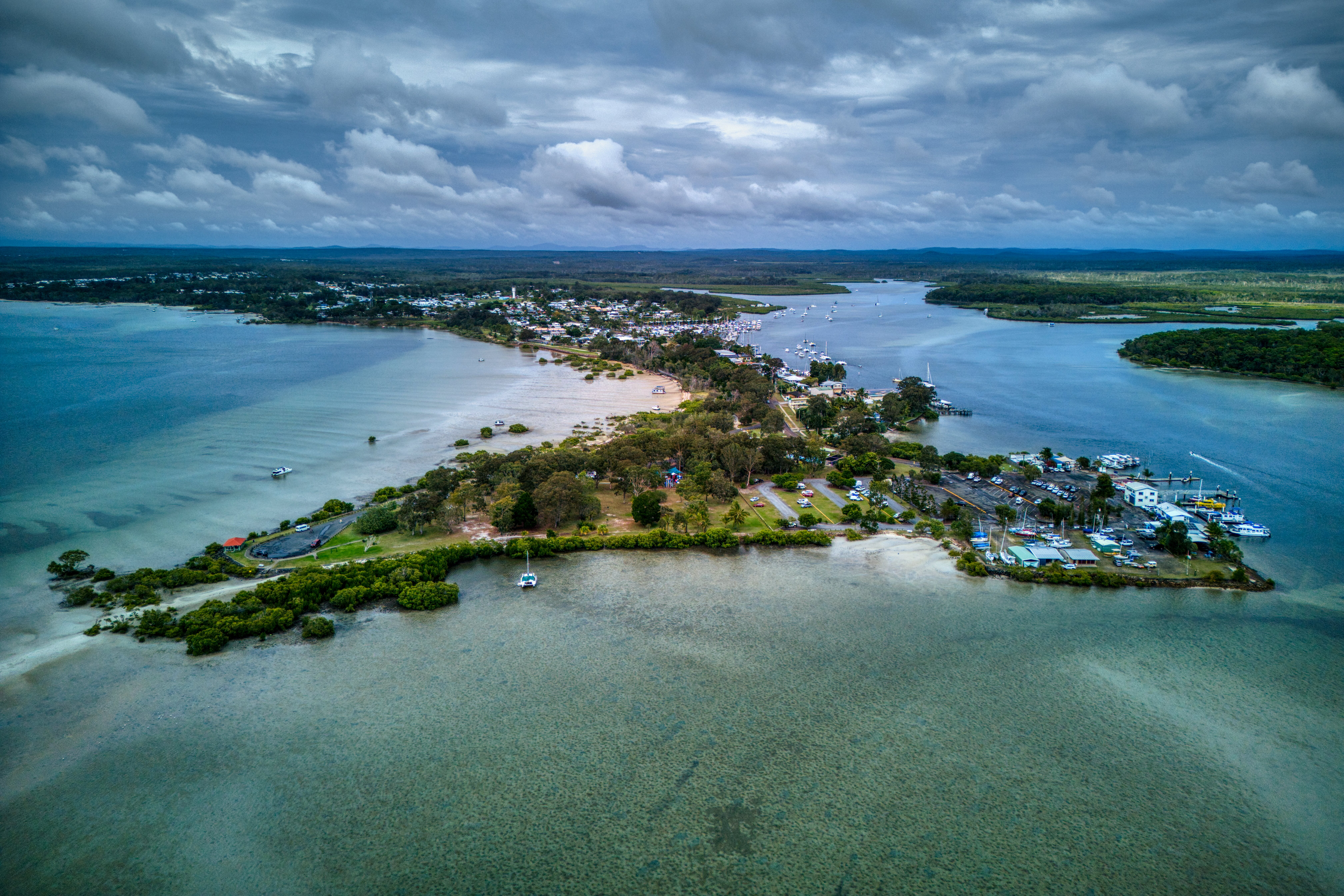
- Tin Can Bay, 2024

- Interactive map of Tin Can Bay
- Coordinates: 25.9163°S 153.0036°E
- Country: Australia
- State: Queensland
- LGAs: Fraser Coast Region; Gympie Region
- Location: 52.2 km (32.4 mi) NE of Gympie; 71.0 km (44.1 mi) SE of Maryborough; 102 km (63 mi) S of Hervey Bay; 220 km (140 mi) N of Brisbane

Government
  - State electorate: Gympie
  - Federal division: Wide Bay

Area
  - Total: 262.1 km^{2} (101.2 sq mi)
- Elevation: 8 m (26 ft)

Population
  - Total: 2,293 (2021 census)
  - Density: 8.749/km^{2} (22.659/sq mi)
- Time zone: UTC+10:00 (AEST)
- Postcode: 4580
Localities around Tin Can Bay
Tuan Forest	Tinnanbar	Great Sandy Strait
Toolara Forest	Tin Can Bay	Inskip
Wallu	Cooloola Cove	Cooloola

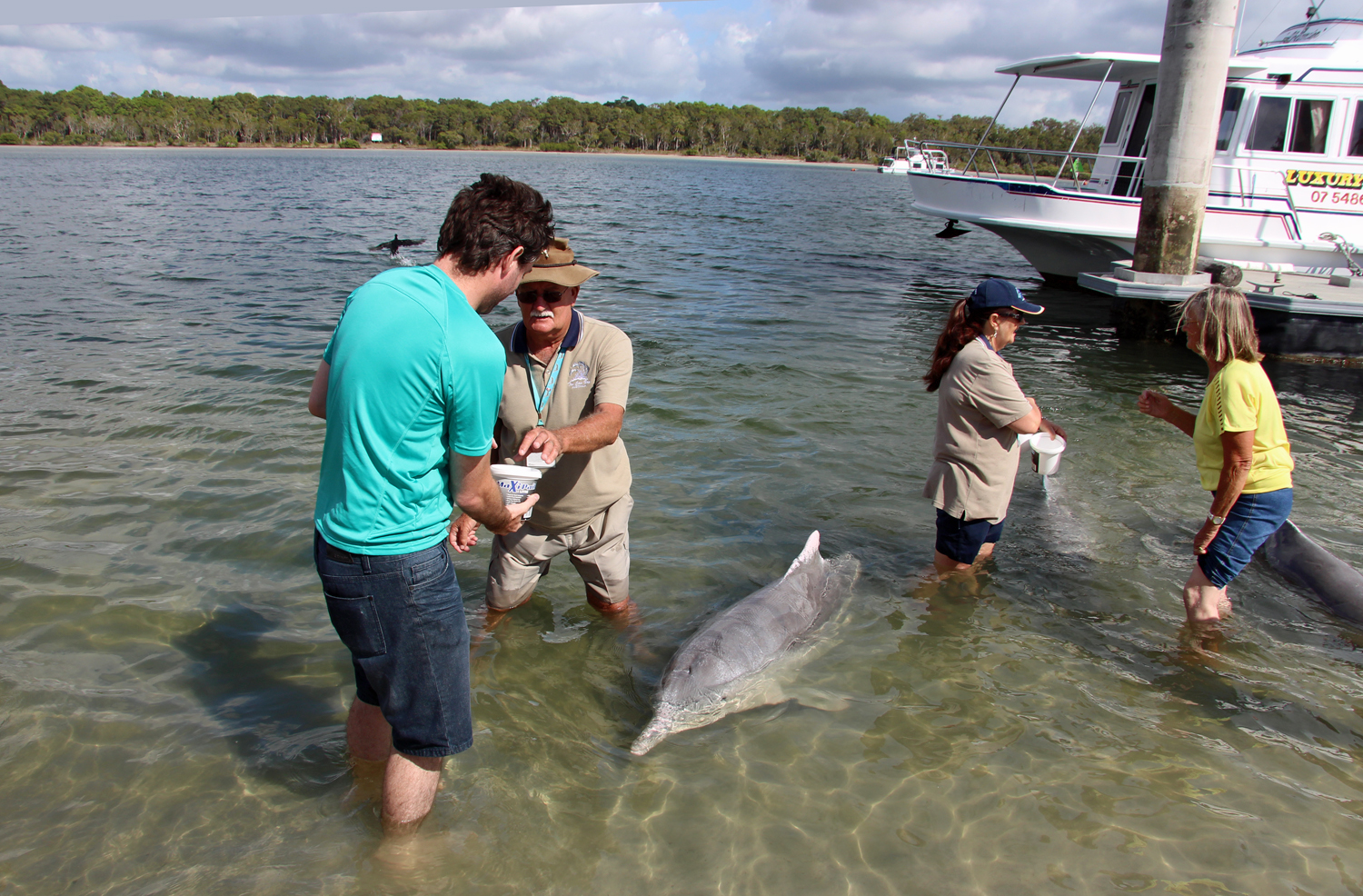
Dolphin Feeding at Tin Can Bay

Tin Can Bay is a coastal town and locality in the Wide Bay–Burnett region in Queensland, Australia. The locality is split between the Fraser Coast Region (the northern part of the locality) and the Gympie Region (southern part of the locality), but the town itself is within Gympie Region. In the 2021 census, the locality of Tin Can Bay had a population of 2,293 people.

== Geography ==
The locality of Tin Can Bay is bounded on the east by the Great Sandy Strait, which separates mainland Queensland from Fraser Island. The area is a Ramsar Convention wetland of International Importance and an Important Bird Area of Australia.

The town is located on a peninsula between Snapper Creek and the Great Sandy Strait.

== History ==
The Tin Can Bay and K'gari (Fraser Island) area is part of the traditional lands of the Kabi Kabi (Gubbi Gubbi) and Butchulla people, who have lived there for at least 30,000 years.

European settlement began in the 1870s, at the point where logs would be floated to the timber mills at Maryborough. It later became, and remains, an important fishing port, with a focus on prawns as well as recreational fishing.

In July 1932, town and suburban land sales occurred in the Town of Wallu. The town's name was officially changed to Tin Can Bay in 1937.

The origins of the name "Tin Can" are uncertain, but is probably derived from an indigenous name for the area, possibly the Kabi Kabi or Butchlla words "tuncanbar" or "tuncunba", which mean "place of dugong", "home of the dugong" or "place of plenty". Other possibilities are "'tinchin", meaning "mangrove"' in the Yugarabul dialect of the Yuggera language, or "'tinken", meaning "vine with large ribbed leaves", from the Dulinbara dialect of the Doombarah clan of the Kabi Kabi.

In 1934, the Wallu post office was opened in Mr V. G. Mason's premises, although the name Tin Can Bay was already in use at that time. Arrangements were also made for a telephone connection. Mason also erected a hall.

Wallu State School opened on 1 February 1934 in a school building which had been relocated from the Wolvi area. It was renamed Tin Can Bay State School on 21 April 1937, reflecting the town's name change on 25 February 1937.

In 1939, the first Catholic mass was held in the public hall. In 1945, a house on 1 acre (0.40 ha) of land was converted to become St John Vianney's Catholic Church.

In 1952, the Baptists constructed a timber church using volunteer labour. The church was opened on 16 February 1952.

The Tin Can Bay Library opened in 1985 and underwent a major refurbishment in 2005.

Tin Can Bay was formerly in the Shire of Cooloola until its amalgamation in 2008 into the Gympie Region.

== Demographics ==
In the 2011 census, the locality of Tin Can Bay had a population of 1,994 people.

In the 2016 census, the locality of Tin Can Bay had a population of 2,242 people.

In the 2021 census, the locality of Tin Can Bay had a population of 2,293 people.

== Heritage listings ==
Tin Can Bay has a number of heritage-listed sites, including:

- Tin Can Bay Picnic Shelter, Cod Street
- Tin Can Bay Memorial Hall, Gympie Road
- Tin Can Bay Church, 22–24 Gympie Road (facing Bream Street, 25.91262°S 153.00568°E)
- Wide Bay Military Reserve, Tin Can Bay Road (25.8733°S 152.9348°E)

== Education ==
Tin Can Bay State School is a government primary and secondary (Prep-10) school for boys and girls at 2 Schnapper Creek Road (25.9254°S 152.9950°E). In 2018, the school had an enrolment of 271 students with 26 teachers (24 full-time equivalent) and 22 non-teaching staff (15 full-time equivalent). It includes a special education program.

For secondary schooling to Year 12, the nearest government secondary school is Gympie State High School in Gympie to the south-west.

== Amenities ==
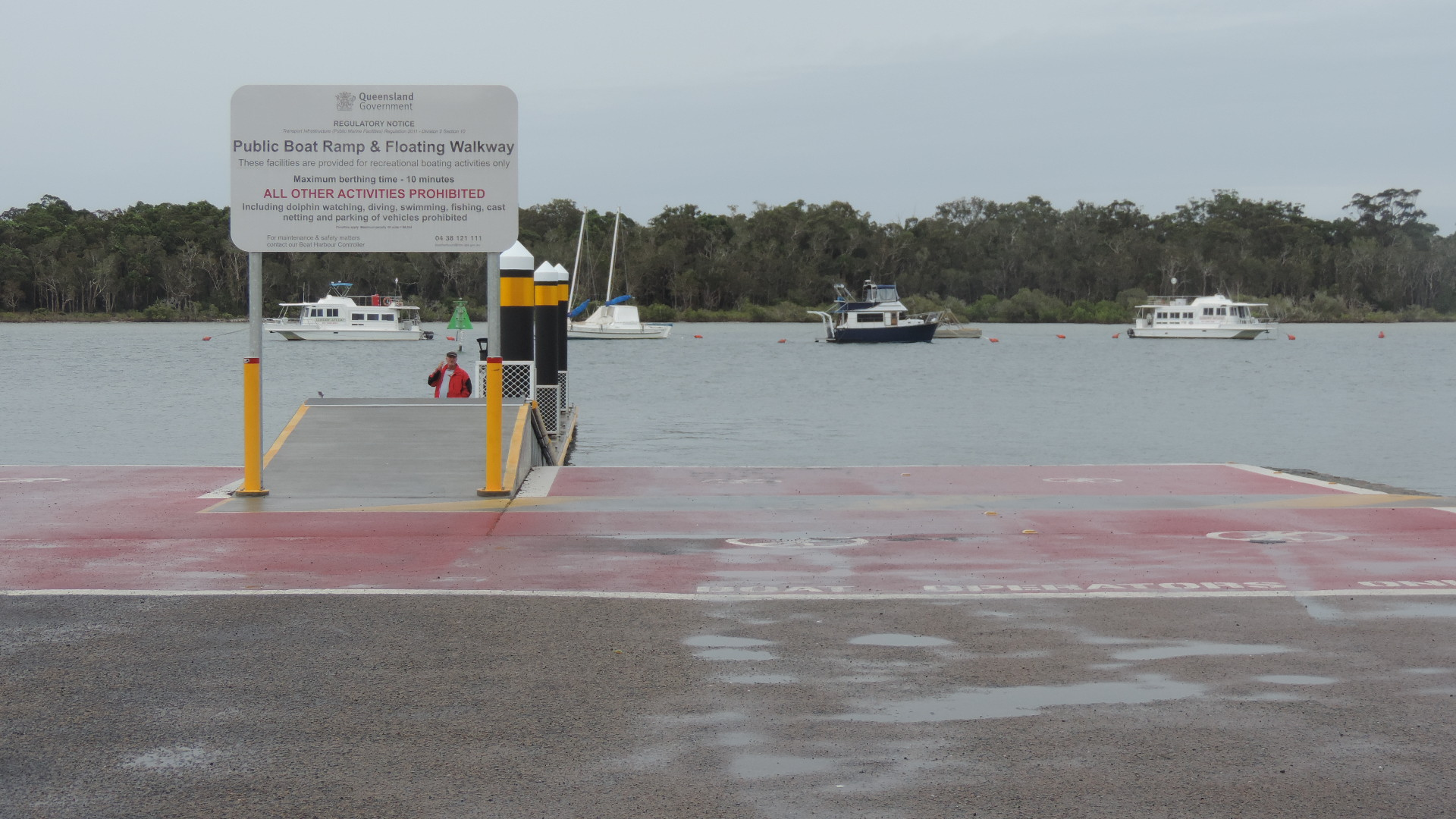
Norman Point boat ramp, 2016

The Gympie Regional Council operate a public library at the park on Tin Can Bay Road (25.9147°S 153.0058°E).

The Tin Can Bay branch of the Queensland Country Women's Association meets at 18 Whiting Street.

Tin Can Bay Community Baptist Church is at 2 Buchanan Street (25.909972°S 153.0057°E).

St John Vianney's Catholic Church is at 24 Bream Street (25.912558°S 153.0056°E). It is also used by Anglican Church and Lutheran Church.

Tin Can Bay Country Club is at 222 Tin Can Bay Road.

Cooloola Coast Bowls Club is at 4463 Gympie Road.

There are boat ramps in the locality, located at:

- Norman Point boat ramp (25.9017°S 153.0136°E), managed by Transport and Main Roads
- Toolara Road on the north bank of Teewah Creek (25.9309°S 153.0155°E), managed by the Gympie Regional Council

== Attractions ==
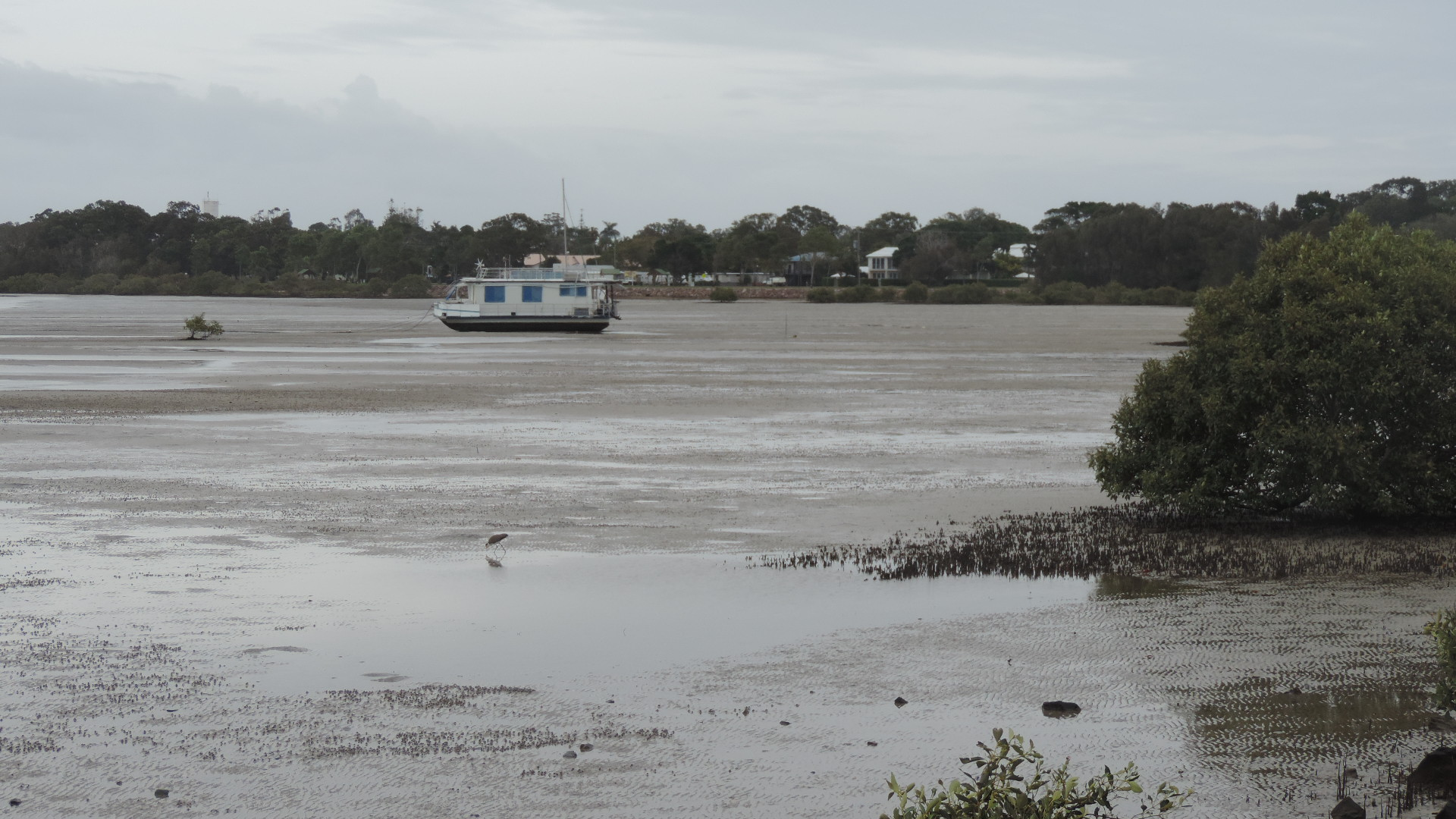
The mangrove areas at Norman Point are popular for bird watching, 2016

The seaside town is a popular holiday destination. Recreational facilities include hotels, holiday units and caravan parks, with houseboats and yachts for hire and a marina. Active sports facilities include an 18-hole golf course, two bowls clubs, tennis courts and an outdoor swimming pool.

An important tourist feature is the regular arrival of wild Australian humpback dolphins which usually appear early mornings next to the Norman Point boat ramp. These dolphins can be hand fed under close supervision. Bird watching is another popular activity as Tin Can Bay is home to a wide variety of birds.

== Events ==
Each September the town hosts the Tin Can Bay Seafood Festival, a day of family fun, with entertainment, novelty competitions such as mullet throwing and prawn eating, helicopter joy flights over the bay, seafood and market stalls, Although the last elected council leader had since cancelled the Seafood festival and the town Falk haven't forgiven her since.

Other events throughout the year include the Bay to Bay Yacht Race, Dragonboat Regatta, Cooloola Coast Flower Show and the Foreshore Family Carnival from Boxing Day to New Year's Eve.
