= William Pettigrew (politician) =

Australian politician (1825–1906)

The Hon William Pettigrew
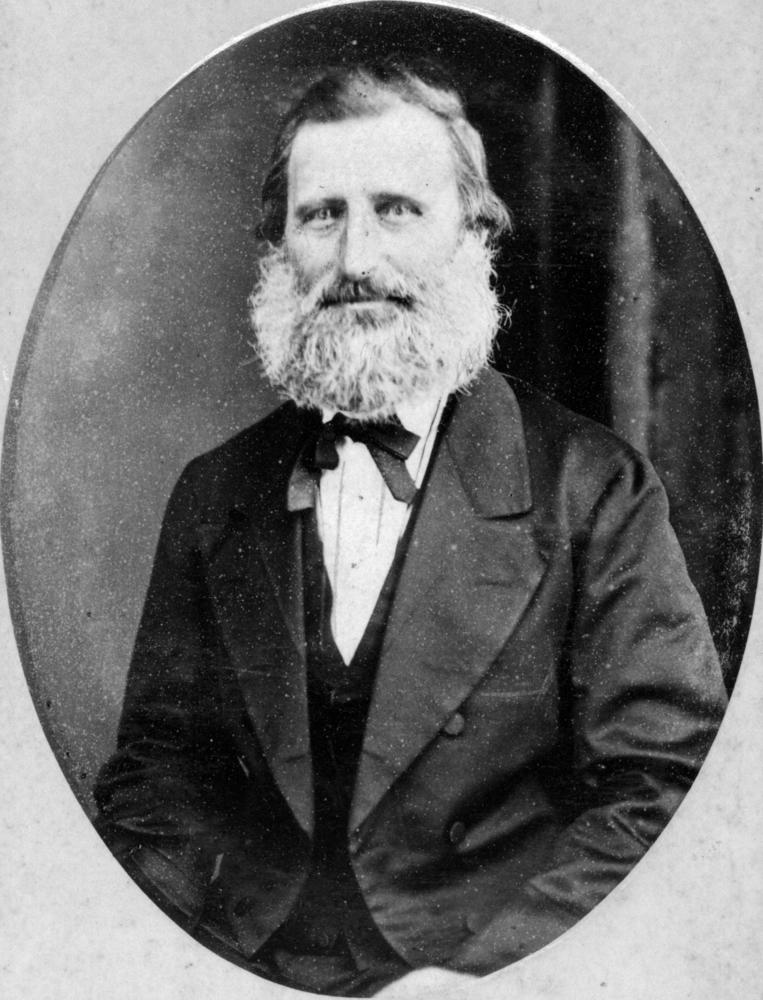
- William Pettigrew, Brisbane, ca. 1875

8th Mayor of Brisbane
- In office 1868–1869
- Preceded by: Albert Hockings
- Succeeded by: William Pettigrew

Member of the Queensland Legislative Council
- In office 12 May 1877 – 23 June 1894

Personal details
- Born: William Pettigrew; 26 August 1825 Tarbolton, Ayr, Scotland
- Died: 28 October 1906 (aged 81) Bowen, Queensland, Australia
- Spouse: Amelia Davis (m.1859 d.1893)
- Occupation: Surveyor, Company director, Farmer

William Pettigrew (26 August 1825 – 28 October 1906) was an alderman and mayor of Brisbane, Queensland, Australia and a Member of the Legislative Council of Queensland, Australia.

== Personal life ==
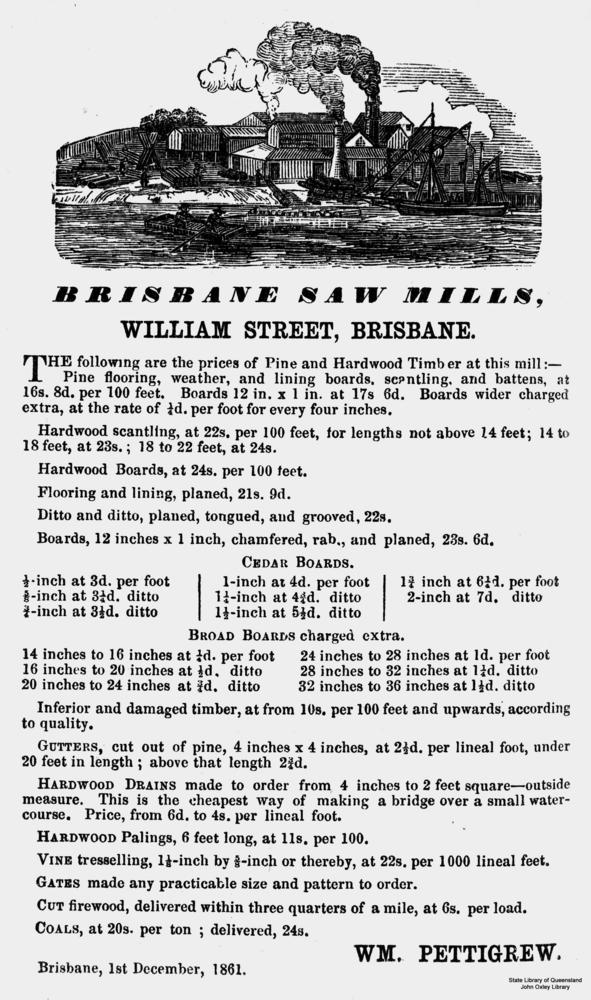
Advertisement for Brisbane Saw Mills, William Street, Brisbane, 1861

William Pettigrew was born on 26 August 1825 at Tarbolton, Ayr, Scotland, the son of Robert Pettigrew (a farmer) and Mary McWhinnie. He trained as a surveyor and emigrated to Brisbane in 1848 on the Fortitude arriving in Moreton Bay in January 1849.

He married Amelia Boughay in Brisbane on 19 February 1859. Amelia was born on 19 Jan 1824 in London, the daughter of Philip Boughay and Elizabeth Nash. Amelia had also immigrated on the Fortitude. They had the following children:

- Margaret, born Brisbane 1859
- Robert, born Brisbane 1862
- Mary Ann, born Brisbane 1866

Amelia had previously been married to Joseph Ward Davis, registered in the September quarter of 1848 in Newington, Surrey, England. So, William had two stepsons from Amelia's first marriage:

- Charles Ward Davis, born 1850
- Joseph Boughay Davis, born 1854

Sadly, William's stepson Joseph Davis accidentally drowned in the Brisbane River in October 1859, while playing with other boys.

On 15 December 1881, William's daughter Margaret married Philip, the eldest son of another Brisbane alderman and mayor, John Hardgrave. At that time, the Pettigrew family were living in William Street. Mary Ann Pettigrew married Harry Ward Davis, son of E. Davis Esq of Charlton Kent on 7 April 1891.

William was a strict Presbyterian who believed in keeping Sabbath sacred. He practised this belief by walking to church and banning musical instruments during the church service.

William's wife Amelia died at their home "Nungurum", Eagle Junction, Brisbane on 1 September 1893 and is buried in Toowong Cemetery together with her son Charles Ward Davis who died in 1895. William retired to Bowen where he lived with his daughter Mary Ann and her husband Harry Davis until he died on 28 Oct 1906 and is buried in Bowen.

== Business life ==
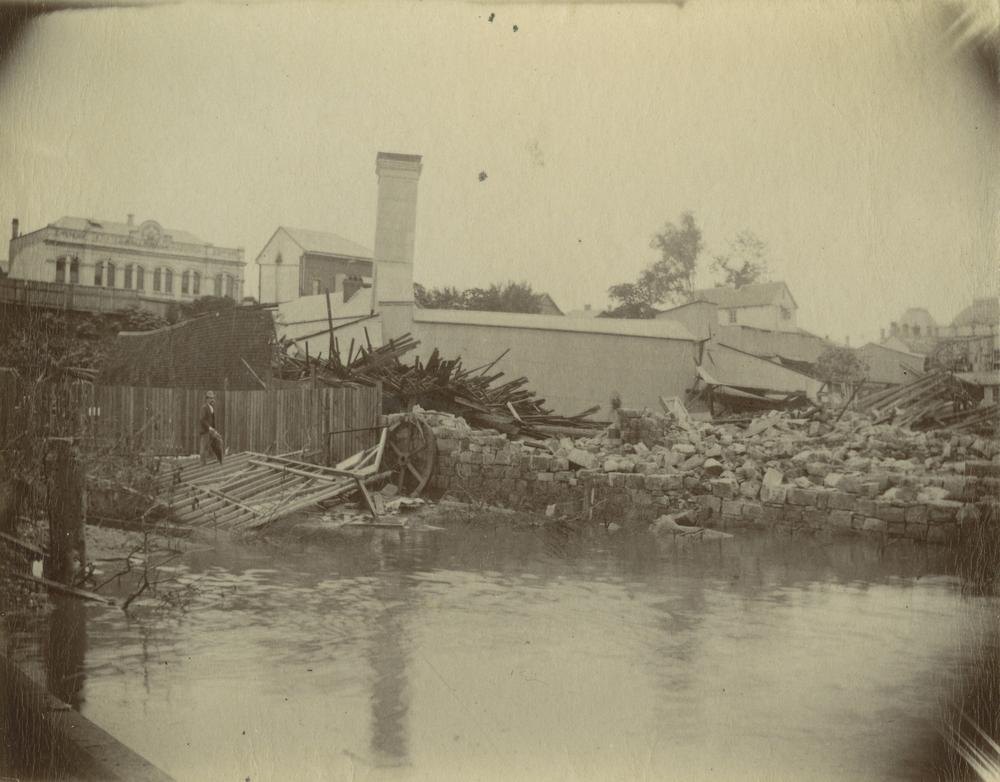
Pettigrew's Sawmill inundated with floodwater, Brisbane, 1893

William Pettigrew was a surveyor who established a number of businesses including sawmills and a shipping business. His early work in the Brisbane area as a surveyor revealed to him the quantity and quality of timber available and how profitable it could be if it was milled efficiently without the need for intensive labour.

=== Brisbane businesses ===
In January 1852, William Pettigrew purchased land on the banks of the Brisbane River near the corner of William Street and Margaret Street, Brisbane in order to build the first steam-powered sawmill in Queensland. The sawmill was built by another Brisbane pioneer and mayor John Petrie and was operational in July 1853. The mill was supplied with timber from land William Pettigrew had bought at Moggill from where the logs were floated down the Brisbane River to the mill. The mill was very profitable for many years but, as the railways were established, the lack of rail link to his mill became a disadvantage compared to other mills. Finally his mill was inundated in the 1893 Brisbane flood and by 1898 William Pettigrew went bankrupt.

=== Maryoochydore businesses ===
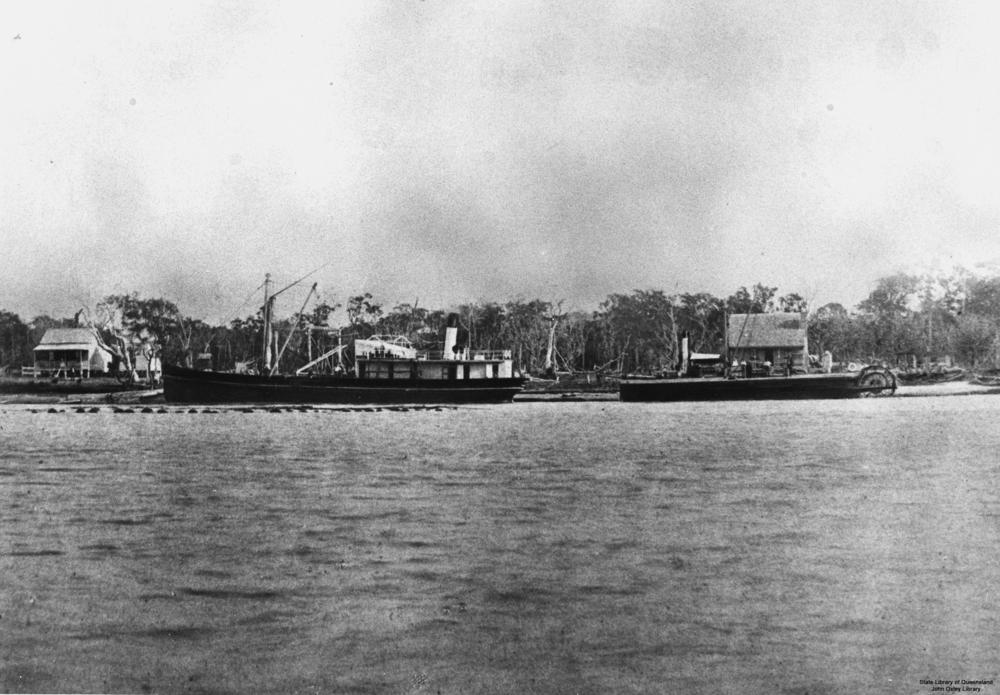
Ships anchored at Pettigrew's wharf, Maroochydore, 1882

Around 1862, the area around Maroochydore was opened up for development. In 1863, William Pettigrew visited the area and found there was plentiful timber to be obtained, including hardwood, cedar, bunya and kauri pine. Although there was good timber there, the Maroochy River bar was hazardous. So William Pettigrew established a depot and wharf at Mooloolah Heads (now known as Mooloolaba) to deliver timber to his Brisbane sawmill.

Later in 1884, he established a landing place at Maroochydore to receive timber floated down the Maroochy River. In 1891, he opened a sawmill on the bank of the Maroochy River at Cotton Tree and now known as Wharf St, Maroochydore.

William Pettigrew had three steamers that he used on the run to the Maroochy River, "Tadorna Radja", "Tarshaw" and "Gneering".

William Pettigrew closed his sawmill at Maroochydore in 1898 and sold up his land holdings (Cotton Tree, Potts Point, Mooloolah Heads) in the Maroochy area in 1903. These events appear to coincide with both his bankruptcy as well as timber-getting becoming uneconomic (all the suitable trees in the area having been cut down) and a rail link to Brisbane reduced the need for a steamer service.

William Pettigrew jointly owned the Pettigrew and Sims Sawmill at Dundathu and established the (now heritage-listed) Cooloola Tramway to provide access to it.

== Public life ==
William Pettigrew was an alderman of the Brisbane Municipal Council from 1863 to 1884 and mayor in 1870.

He served on the following committees:

- Improvement Committee 1863, 1864, 1869, 1870, 1877–1880
- Water Committee 1863, 1864
- Lighting Committee 1863
- Bridge Committee 1864, 1869, 1870
- Finance Committee 1865, 1871, 1872, 1878, 1881, 1883
- Town Hall Committee 1869, 1870
- Legislative Committee 1870, 1871, 1879–1882, 1884
- Wharfage Committee 1881
- Works Committee 1882, 1884

From 1880 to 1883, he was a member of the Caboolture Divisional Board and chairman of that board in 1881.

William Pettigrew was appointed a life member of the Legislative Council of Queensland from 12 May 1877 but resigned on 23 June 1894.

He was a member of:

- the Queensland Philosophical Society
- the Brisbane School of Arts Committee
- the Queensland Acclimatisation Society (a life member)

== See also ==
- List of mayors and lord mayors of Brisbane
- List of tramways in Queensland
