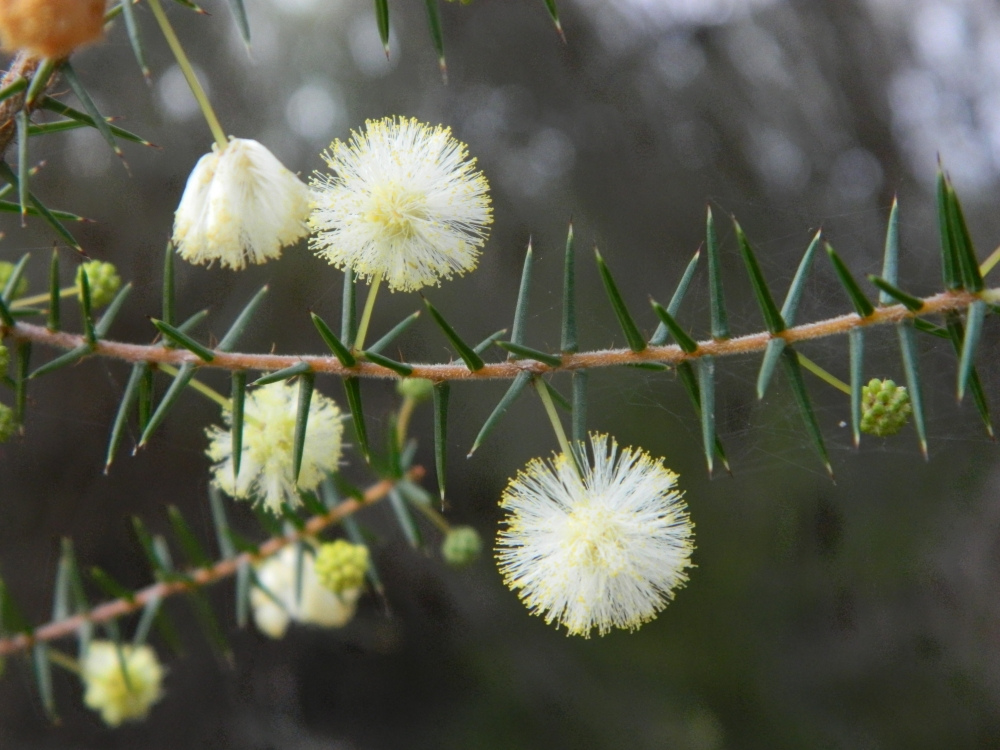
- Flowers and phyllodes

Scientific classification
- Kingdom: Plantae
- Clade: Embryophytes
- Clade: Tracheophytes
- Clade: Spermatophytes
- Clade: Angiosperms
- Clade: Eudicots
- Clade: Rosids
- Order: Fabales
- Family: Fabaceae
- Subfamily: Caesalpinioideae
- Clade: Mimosoid clade
- Genus: Acacia
- Species: A. ulicifolia

Binomial name
- Acacia ulicifolia (Salisb.) Court
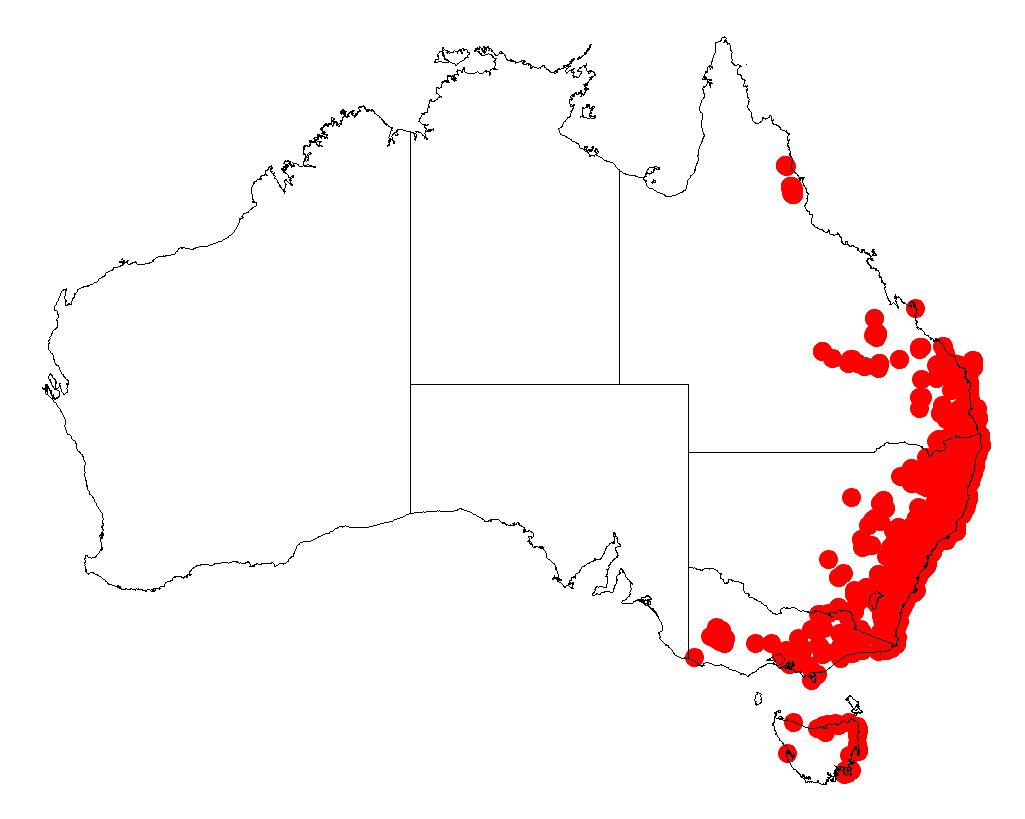
- Occurrence data from AVH

Synonyms
- Mimosa ulicifolia Salisb.; Racosperma ulicifolia (Salisb.) Pedley

= Acacia ulicifolia =

Species of legume

Acacia ulicifolia, commonly known as prickly Moses or juniper wattle is a shrub of the genus Acacia and the subgenus Phyllodineae, native to Australia.

== Description ==
Acacia ulicifolia is decumbent to an erect shrub 0.5–2 m (1 ft 8 in – 6 ft 7 in) high, with smooth grey bark. The phyllodes which are leaf like in appearance and function, are short and needle like, 8–14 mm (0.31–0.55 in) long.

The inflorescence of the plant, or the collections of flowers, consist of a flower head attached to the stem by a long slender stalk 8–15 mm (0.31–0.59 in) long. The flowers are pale cream. The pod is 3–5 cm (1.2–2.0 in) long, 3 mm (0.12 in) wide, curved and evenly constricted between the seeds. Flowering period is mid autumn to mid spring.

The common name prickly Moses is a corruption of prickly mimosa.

== Taxonomy ==
Acacia ulicifolia was first described by R.A. Salisbury in 1796 as Mimosa ulicifolia, but in 1957 was placed in the genus Acacia by A.B. Court.

== Habitat and ecology ==
Acacia ulicifolia is found in dry sclerophyll forests and woodlands, usually in sandy soil. It is widespread in New South Wales along the coast and tablelands. It is also found in Queensland, Victoria (Australia) and Tasmania.

== See also ==
- List of Acacia species

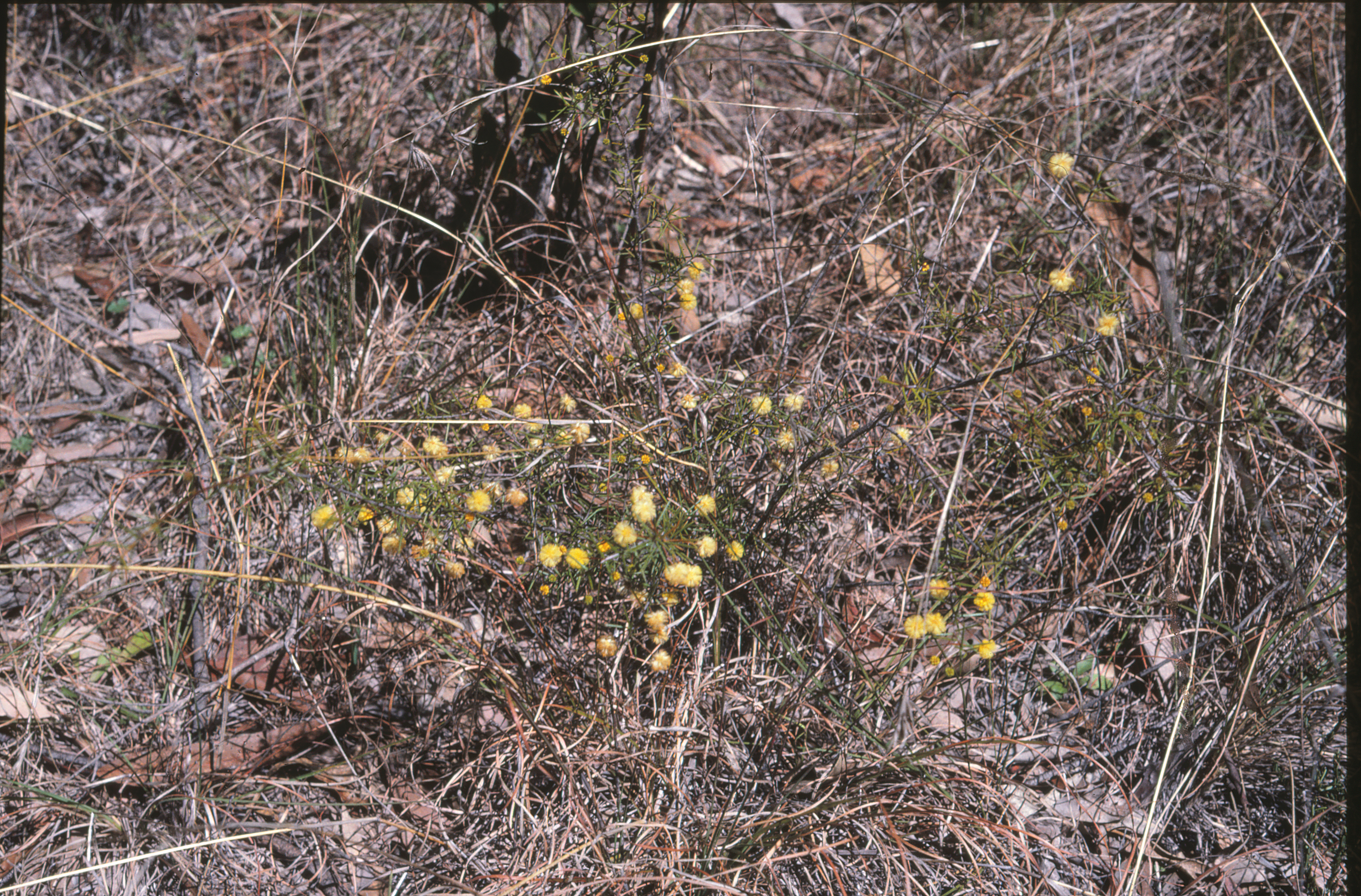
Habit in Girraween National Park
