= Grand Hotel, Childers =

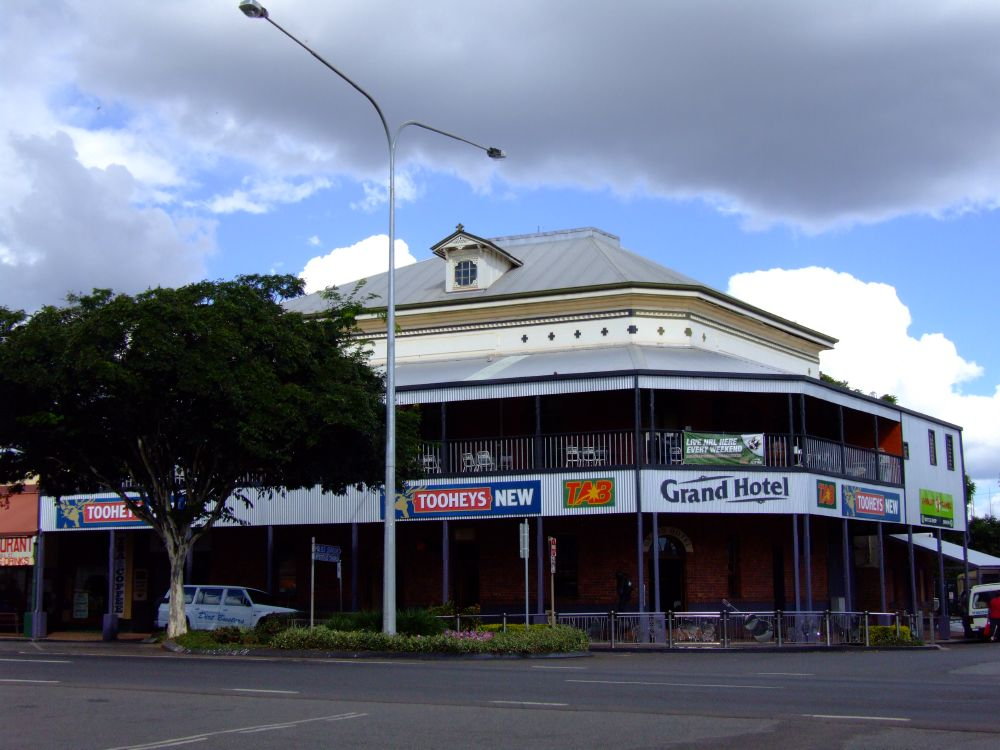
- Grand Hotel, 2008

- Location within Queensland Location within Australia
- 25.2369°S 152.2774°E
- Location: 106–110 Churchill Street, Childers, Bundaberg Region, Queensland, Australia

History
- Design period: 1870s–1890s (late 19th century)
- Built: 1899–1900
- Built for: Johann Wilhelm Albert Kulick

Site notes
- Architect: Anton Hettrich

Queensland Heritage Register
- Official name: Grand Hotel, Childers Hotel
- Type: state heritage (built)
- Designated: 21 October 1992
- Reference no.: 600608
- Significant period: 1890s (fabric); 1899–ongoing (historical use)
- Significant components: kitchen/kitchen house

Grand Hotel is a heritage-listed hotel at 106–110 Churchill Street, Childers, Bundaberg Region, Queensland, Australia. It was designed by Anton Hettrich built from 1899 to 1900. It is also known as Childers Hotel. It was added to the Queensland Heritage Register on 21 October 1992.

== History ==
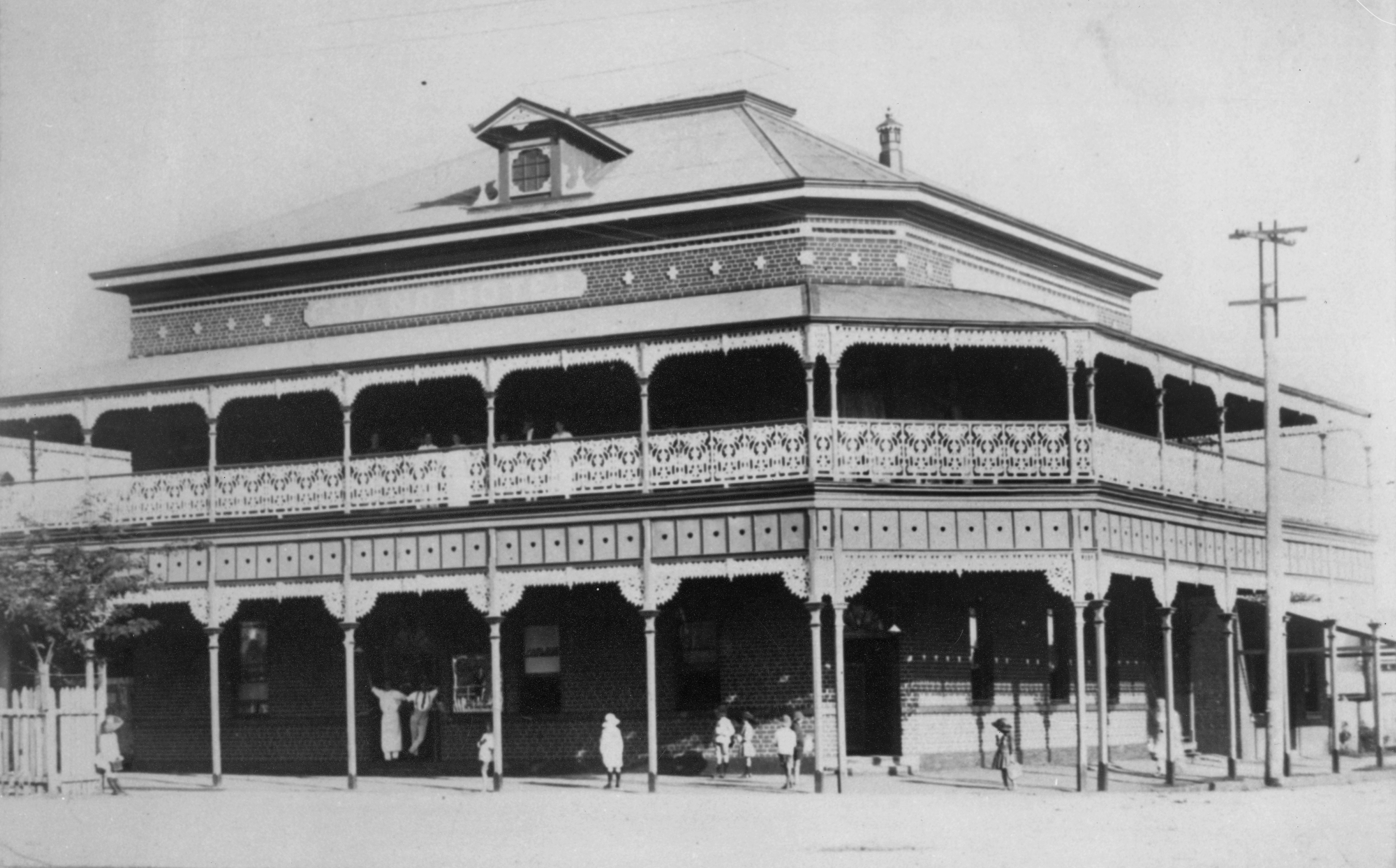
Grand Hotel in Childers, circa 1910

The two-story brick Grand Hotel was built in 1899 for Johann Wilhelm Albert Kulick by Bundaberg architect Anton Hettrich on the site of Childers first hotel. The new hotel was one of 5 hotels established in the 1890s in the newly emerging sugar town of Childers.

Following logging of the dense Isis Scrub in the 1870s, Childers, in the heart of the scrub, was promoted in the 1880s by Maryborough interests as an agricultural district. The land in the immediate vicinity of the present town of Childers was surveyed in 1882 into 50-acre (20 ha) farm blocks. There was no official town survey; Childers developed following the private subdivision of portions 870 and 871, at the railhead of the 1887 Isis railway line from Isis Junction. This was opened on 31 October 1887, and was intended principally to facilitate the transport of timber from the scrub.

The coming of the railway not only promoted the development of the town of Childers; it also proved the catalyst for the establishment of a sugar industry in the district in the late 1880s. At the opening of the railway to Childers, Robert Cran, owner of Maryborough's Yengarie mill, announced that he would erect a double crushing juice mill at Doolbi, to supply his mill at Yengarie. This was completed in 1890, with the juice being brought in railway tankers from the Isis. Further expansion of the sugar industry in the Isis was closely related to the activities of the Colonial Sugar Refining Company, which erected a central crushing mill in the district 1893–94, and began crushing in 1895. By 1895, at least three other mills had been established in the Isis, with another two under construction, and Childers had emerged as the flourishing centre of a substantial sugar-growing district: in the years between 1891 and 1900 the population grew from 91 to 4,000. In 1903 the old Isis Divisional Board (1886) was abolished and Isis Shire proclaimed, with the new seat of municipal government moving from Howard to Childers.

William Ashby was one of the first generation of purchasers of town land following the subdivision of portion 870. He had previously been a publican and in 1886 moved a modest timber hotel in sections from nearby Horton and erected it on his land as the Childers Hotel. This was for several years the only hotel in the town and was described in 1892 as a "comfortable hostelry". In 1894 the site was enlarged to its present size when Ashby purchased the adjoining block. In the same year three more hotel licenses were granted for the Queen's Hotel, the Bellevue Hotel, and the Royal Hotel and in 1898 the Palace Hotel opened. In 1897 the Childers Hotel was purchased by Johann Kulick who replaced it with a new two story brick hotel in 1899 to the design of Bundaberg architect Anton Hettrich.

Anton Hettrich (1860–1946) emigrated to Queensland from Germany around 1884 when he set up in practice as an architect in Bundaberg; soon after winning competitions for the Bundaberg Town Hall and the School of Arts. He also designed the Primitive Methodist Church and Sacred Heart Roman Catholic Church in Childers. Frederick Faircloth, who later designed many buildings in Childers, was his pupil.

The new hotel was called the Grand Hotel, and photographs show how it dominated the townscape; towering over the row of single-story timber shops which lined the southern side of the street prior and the single-story timber buildings housing government and banking services on the northern side. In 1902 a devastating fire swept through the southern side of the street, destroying all of the buildings in this block except the brick Grand Hotel. Following this fire, new and elegant brick shops and a new Palace Hotel were constructed, which radically altered the appearance of the street and more closely matched the style and detail of the Grand Hotel.

Photographs taken in the early 1900s show that the hotel had decorative cast-iron balustrading on the verandahs and a widow's walk at the peak of roof. A 1902 photograph shows a single-story brick building with a corrugated-iron roof to the rear of hotel as well as a small building with a chimney to the rear of that building. These are presumably service buildings, and it is not known if these were part of the new construction or had belonged to the former hotel building. By 1908 the verandah had been extended to the eastern elevation which gave a covered way along the western boundary of the site at ground level. By this time the centre of Childers was a thriving commercial centre and had many new commercial buildings, including the Federal Hotel built in 1907–1908, across the road from the Grand, by William Ashby.

In 1896 the railway line linked Childers to Cordalba, and later extended on to Dallamil and Booyal, which helped to build the number of settlers in the area and brought more people into Childers for shopping and recreation. As the sugar industry developed, the population of the district was swelled enormously by seasonal workers who came in to cut the cane harvest by hand. Special Saturday trains were laid on to take workers into Childers for shopping and to return them late at night. This influx of business contributed in a major way to the prosperity of the town. The closure of some mills in the Interwar period and the changeover to mechanical harvesting in the 1960s substantially reduced this influx of seasonal labour and the change to road transport saw the closure of rail link to Booyal closed in 1955 and to Childers itself in 1964. The town currently supports two operational hotels, the Hotel Childers and the Grand Hotel.

== Description ==
The Grand Hotel is prominently situated on the corner of Churchill and McIwraith Streets, Childers. It is a two-storey brick building with a trapezoidal plan form that follows the street alignment.

The building has a wide surrounding two storeyed timber verandah with a convex curved corrugated iron roof. The brick walls of the building rise above the verandah at the first floor level and are decorated with a number of raised Greek crosses at the corners, long rendered sign panels and a continuous birdsmouth string course. The cast iron balustrade has been removed and the timber frame has been enclosed with fibre cement sheet. A small section of the cast iron balustrade survives on the southern verandah.

The main roof, which is clad in corrugated iron, is hipped and surmounted by the remains of a "widows walk". The decorative cast iron balustrade has been removed from this section of the building. There is a dormer window in the north face of the main roof which has a projecting gabled roof supported by timber brackets and surmounted by a short finial. The gable is infilled with a decorated timber bracket. A decorated cylindrical vent survives on the western face of the main roof.

Built hard up against the west verandah is a two storeyed brick building with a rectangular floor plan and hipped roof, which now serves as accommodation, bottle store and kitchen. A single storey convex corrugated iron verandah supported on timber posts is situated on the western elevation. The windows are double hung timber and the pair of windows on the west elevation have hoods. Attached to the east of this what may be the original kitchen, a single storeyed section with a pyramid roof.

The main entrance to the building is through a pair of heavy timber double doors with a half light over to a central hallway. To the west is the bar area, this has been opened up to form one space. Double hung timber windows open out onto the footpath in this area. To the east of the main hall is a large space that runs from the front to the back of the building, the transverse walls have been removed and there is a bar at the south end. This space opens through a single door onto an area beneath the southern verandah. The kitchen and bottle shop runs beside this with the hotel manager's accommodation section over.

The first floor is accessed via a timber half turn stair that has turned newel posts and turned balusters. The stair rises to a landing which has corridors leading off in three directions. These lead to accommodation rooms through four panel timber doors. The rooms are divided with vertical timber tongue and grooved boards mounted on an exposed timber post and rail frame. Each room opens onto the verandah via timber French doors. The south east and south west sections of the verandah has been enclosed for toilets and showers.

== Heritage listing ==
The Grand Hotel was listed on the Queensland Heritage Register on 21 October 1992 having satisfied the following criteria.

The place is important in demonstrating the evolution or pattern of Queensland's history.

The Grand Hotel is one of a number of hotels which were erected in Childers within a few years of each other in the late 19th and early 20th centuries. As a provider of food, accommodation and entertainment, the number and size of hotels in a town were used as an indicator of the prosperity of a district. The Grand, as the earliest of the surviving hotels in Childers, illustrates the unprecedented growth then occurring in the Isis, when Childers was emerging as the flourishing centre of a substantial sugar-growing district.

The place is important in demonstrating the principal characteristics of a particular class of cultural places.

The Grand Hotel, by its siting, form and detail is a good example of a late nineteenth century hotel.

The place is important because of its aesthetic significance.

The hotel is a landmark in the main street and the roof has been frequently used as a vantage point for taking photographs of the town. By its scale, form, materials and detail it contributes to the architecturally coherent and picturesque townscape, acting as a visual termination to the visual rhythm of the main shopping block.

The place has a special association with the life or work of a particular person, group or organisation of importance in Queensland's history.

Although some of the decorative elements of the hotel have been removed, it has a special association with Bundaberg architect Anton Hettrich as a fine example of his work.
