= Pacific Haven, Queensland =

Pacific Haven
- Suburb
- Interactive map of Pacific Haven
- Coordinates: 25.2677°S 152.5552°E
- Country: Australia
- State: Queensland
- LGA: Fraser Coast Region
- Location: 6.0 km (3.7 mi) N of Howard; 31.7 km (19.7 mi) W of Hervey Bay; 37.5 km (23.3 mi) E of Childers; 285 km (177 mi) N of Brisbane

Government
  - State electorate: Maryborough
  - Federal division: Hinkler

Area
  - Total: 25.4 km^{2} (9.8 sq mi)

Population
  - Total: 778 (2021 census)
  - Density: 30.63/km^{2} (79.33/sq mi)
- Time zone: UTC+10:00 (AEST)
- Postcode: 4659
Suburbs around Pacific Haven
Cherwell	Burrum River	Burrum River
Cherwell	Pacific Haven	Burrum River
Cherwell	Howard	Howard

Pacific Haven is a rural locality in the Fraser Coast Region, Queensland, Australia. In the 2021 census, Pacific Haven had a population of 778 people.

== Geography ==
The Burrum River forms the eastern and northern boundaries, while the Isis River forms part of the western boundary.

Burrum is a neighbourhood in the south-east of the locality (25.3°S 152.5666°E).

The land use is a mixture of rural residential housing and grazing on native vegetation.

== Demographics ==
In the 2016 census, Pacific Haven had a population of 755 people.

In the 2021 census, Pacific Haven had a population of 778 people.

== Education ==
There are no schools in Pacific Haven. The nearest government primary school is Howard State School in neighbouring Howard to the south. The nearest government secondary school is the Isis District State High School in Childers to the west.

== Amenities ==
Pacific Haven Airport is at 153 Pacific Haven Circuit (25.2407°S 152.5430°E). It includes a heliport (25.2398°S 152.5434°E).

There is a boat ramp on Walls Camp Road off Pacific Haven Crescent on the west bank of Burrum River (25.2397°S 152.5617°E). It is managed by the Fraser Coast Regional Council.
