= Buxton, Queensland =

Buxton
- Town
- Interactive map of Buxton
- Coordinates: 25.1858°S 152.4955°E
- Country: Australia
- State: Queensland
- LGA: Bundaberg Region
- Location: 28.9 km (18.0 mi) ENE of Childers; 69.3 km (43.1 mi) NW of Hervey Bay; 79.6 km (49.5 mi) SSE of Bundaberg; 328 km (204 mi) N of Brisbane

Government
  - State electorate: Burnett
  - Federal division: Hinkler

Area
  - Total: 81.8 km^{2} (31.6 sq mi)
- Elevation: 10 m (33 ft)

Population
  - Total: 507 (2021 census)
  - Density: 6.198/km^{2} (16.053/sq mi)
- Postcode: 4660
Localities around Buxton
| Goodwood | Woodgate | Woodgate |
| Redridge | Buxton | Burrum Heads |
| Isis River | Cherwell | Burrum River |

Buxton is a rural locality in the Bundaberg Region, Queensland, Australia. In 2021 census, the locality of Buxton had a population of 507 people.

== Geography ==
The locality of Buxton is bounded to the north and north-east by the Gregory River and to the south by the Isis River and south-east by the Burrum River. Its western boundary is the North Coast railway line. The town is situated on eastern edge on the locality on the banks of the Burrum River, about 20 kilometres (12 mi) from the Bruce Highway (which passes through the neighbouring locality of Isis River and upstream from Walkers Point (in Woodgate) and Burrum Heads (the two settlements to the north and south of the mouth of the river into the Coral Sea).

The Burrum Coast National Park runs from north to south through the centre of the locality.

== History ==
Buxton has been formerly known as Buxtonville, Newport, and Burrumba. It was originally proposed to be a river port with customs and quarantine facilities, but that development never occurred.

The Dundaburra group of the Northern Kabi Kabi Tribe inhabited the area.

== Demographics ==
In the 2006 census, the locality of Buxton and the surrounding area had a population of 391 people.

In the 2011 census, the locality of Buxton had a population of 402 people.

In the 2016 census, the locality of Buxton had a population of 430 people.

In the 2021 census, the locality of Buxton had a population of 507 people.

== Education ==
There are no schools in Buxton. The nearest government primary school is Goodwood State School in neighbouring Goodwood to the north-west. The nearest government secondary school is Isis District State High School in Childers to the south-west.

== Amenities ==
There is a boat ramp and pontoon in Powers Street on the north bank of Burrum River (25.1956°S 152.5416°E). It is managed by the Bundaberg Regional Council.

== Recreation ==
Boat enthusiasts are able to explore four river systems from this area. Flanking the main road into Buxton are a number of rural homesteads. Those on the southern side of the road have river frontage. The area is known as having some of the best fishing, prawn and crabbing waterways in the south east.

== Transport ==
The Isis Junction railway station is on the south-western edge of the locality. It was the junction of the former Isis railway line to Childers.
