= Cherwell, Queensland =

Cherwell
- Suburb
- Interactive map of Cherwell
- Coordinates: 25.2788°S 152.4872°E
- Country: Australia
- State: Queensland
- LGA: Fraser Coast Region
- Location: 10.1 km (6.3 mi) WNW of Howard; 24.2 km (15.0 mi) ESE of Childers; 37.4 km (23.2 mi) S of Hervey Bay; 294 km (183 mi) N of Brisbane

Government
  - State electorates: Maryborough; Burnett
  - Federal division: Hinkler

Area
  - Total: 145.5 km^{2} (56.2 sq mi)

Population
  - Total: 10 (2021 census)
  - Density: 0.07/km^{2} (0.18/sq mi)
- Time zone: UTC+10:00 (AEST)
- Postcode: 4660
Suburbs around Cherwell
Isis River	Buxton	Burrum Heads; Burrum River
Isis River	Cherwell	Pacific Haven
Isis River	Duckinwilla	Howard

Cherwell is a rural locality in the Fraser Coast Region, Queensland, Australia. In the 2021 census, Cherwell had a population of 10 people.

== Geography ==
The Isis River forms the northern boundary, while the Cherwell River flows through from the south-west to form part of the eastern boundary before its confluence with the Isis River.

The Bruce Highway enters the locality from the south-east (Howard) and exits to the south-west (the locality of Isis River). The North Coast railway line also enters the locality from the south-east (Howard) north of the highway and exits to the north-west (the localities of Isis River and Buxton). Cherwell is served by the Wokka railway station (25.2675°S 152.5020°E).

The land use is predominantly grazing on native vegetation.

== Demographics ==
In the 2016 census, Cherwell had a population of 8 people.

In the 2021 census, Cherwell had a population of 10 people.

== Education ==
There are no schools in Cherwell. The nearest government primary schools are Howard State School in neighbouring Howard to the south-east and Goodwood State School in Goodwood to the north-west. The nearest government secondary school is Isis District State High School in Childers to the west.
