= Duckinwilla, Queensland =

Duckinwilla
- Suburb
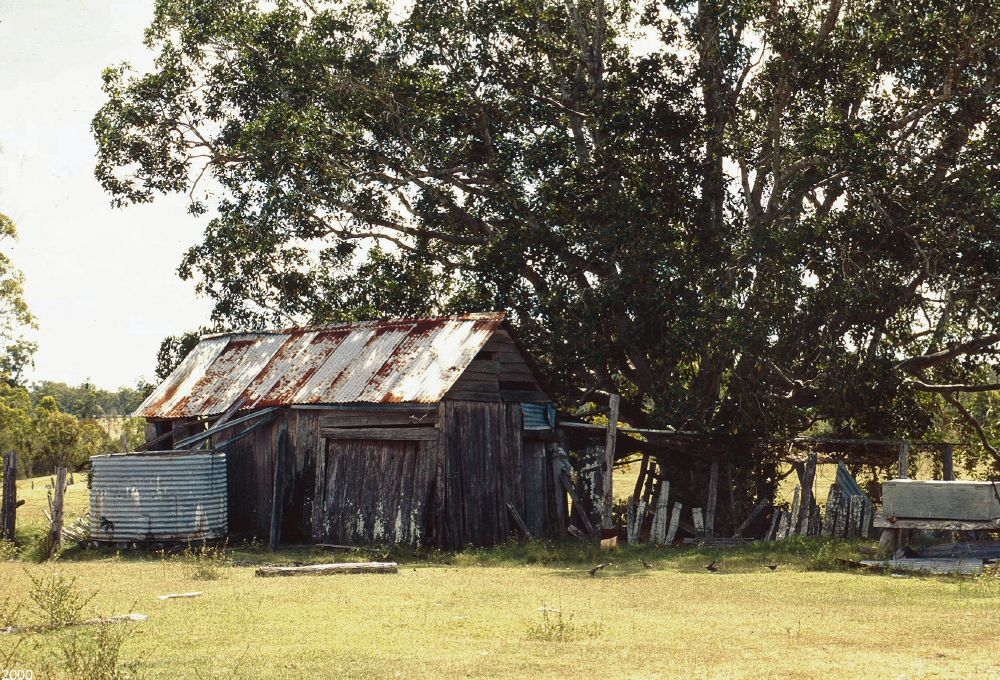
- The heritage-listed Allan Slab Hut in Duckinwilla, 2000

- Interactive map of Duckinwilla
- Coordinates: 25.4122°S 152.515°E
- Country: Australia
- State: Queensland
- LGA: Fraser Coast Region
- Location: 24 km (15 mi) NW of Maryborough; 45 km (28 mi) SW of Hervey Bay; 275 km (171 mi) N of Brisbane

Government
  - State electorate: Maryborough
  - Federal division: Hinkler

Area
  - Total: 321.2 km^{2} (124.0 sq mi)

Population
  - Total: 38 (2021 census)
  - Density: 0.1183/km^{2} (0.306/sq mi)
- Time zone: UTC+10:00 (AEST)
- Postcode: 4650
Suburbs around Duckinwilla
Isis River	Cherwell	Howard; Torbanlea
Kullogum	Duckinwilla	Burgowan; Walliebum
Doongul	Gungaloon; Dunmora	Aldershot

Duckinwilla is a rural locality in the Fraser Coast Region, Queensland, Australia. In the 2021 census, Duckinwilla had a population of 38 people.

== Geography ==
Duckinwilla is mostly forested; much of it is in the Wongi State Forest. There is some cleared land used for farming, but no urban area.

The Bruce Highway passes from south to north through the eastern part of the locality.

In the centre of the locality is Lake Lenthall (25.4166°S 152.5333°E), created by damming the Burrum River (25.4009°S 152.5317°E).

== History ==
The earliest European settler in the district was Eli Lenthall, a timbergetter. Lake Lenthall is named after him.

Duckinwilla Creek State School opened on 24 August 1936 and closed in 1953.

== Demographics ==
In the 2011 census, Duckinwilla had a population of 10 people.

In the 2016 census, Duckinwilla had a population of 12 people.

In the 2021 census, Duckinwilla had a population of 38 people.

== Heritage listings ==
Duckinwilla has a number of heritage-listed sites, including:

- Warrah Road (25.4452°S 152.5333°E): Allan Slab Hut

== Education ==
There are no schools in Duckinwilla. The nearest government primary schools are Howard State School in neighbouring Howard to north-east and Sunbury State School in Maryborough to the south-east. The nearest government secondary schools are Isis District State High School in Childers to the north-west and Aldridge State High School in the Maryborough.

== Attractions ==
Lake Lenthall has picnic grounds, camping, and a boat ramp, all at the end of Lenthall Dam Road (25.4051°S 152.5328°E). It is managed by the Fraser Coast Regional Council.

Wongi Waterholes is a picnic and camping area in the Wongi State Forest, noted for its abundant wildlife. It is accessed from the Kellogum Forestry Road off Warrah Road. There are a number of viewing platforms around the waterholes:

- Wongi Waterhole 1 Viewing Platform (25.4364°S 152.5483°E)
- Wongi Waterhole 2 Viewing Platform (25.4362°S 152.5479°E)
- Wongi Waterhole 3 Viewing Platform (25.4377°S 152.5442°E)
- Wongi Waterhole 4 & 5 Viewing Platform (25.4380°S 152.5439°E)

== In popular culture ==
Duckinwilla is also referenced by songwriter Chad Morgan in the song, Duckinwilla Dance.
