= Woodgate, Queensland =

Woodgate
- Suburb
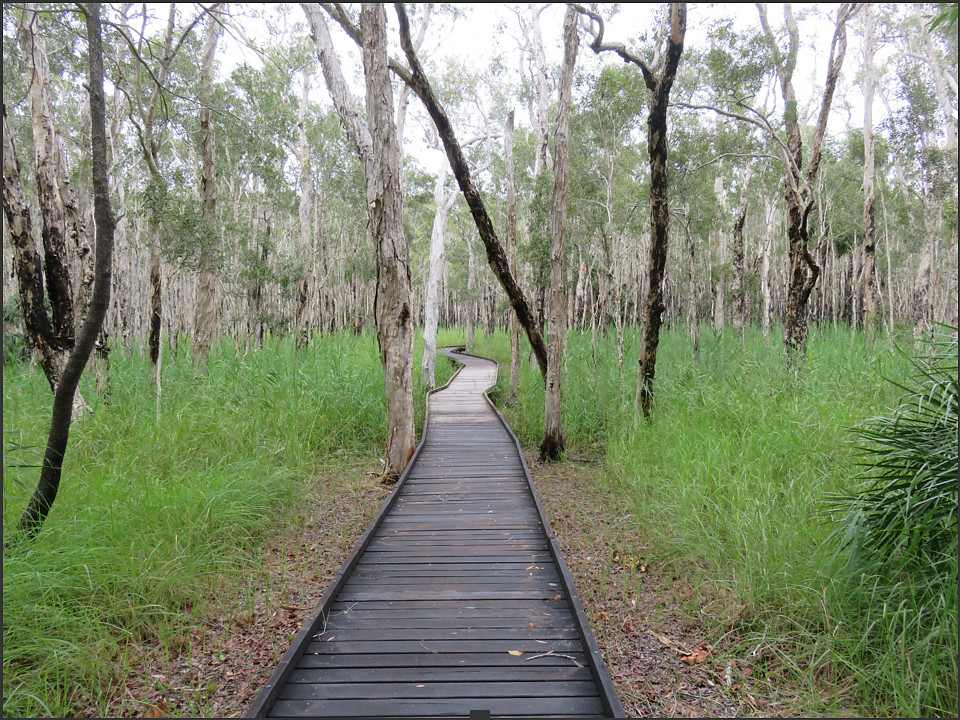
- Banksia wetlands walking track, 2022

- Interactive map of Woodgate
- Coordinates: 25.0833°S 152.5166°E
- Country: Australia
- State: Queensland
- LGA: Bundaberg Region
- Location: 39.7 km (24.7 mi) NE of Childers; 56.1 km (34.9 mi) SE of Bundaberg CBD; 346 km (215 mi) N of Brisbane

Government
  - State electorate: Burnett
  - Federal division: Hinkler

Area
  - Total: 189.2 km^{2} (73.1 sq mi)

Population
  - Total: 1,521 (2021 census)
  - Density: 8.039/km^{2} (20.821/sq mi)
- Time zone: UTC+10:00 (AEST)
- Postcode: 4660
Suburbs around Woodgate
| Kinkuna | Kinkuna | Coral Sea |
| Goodwood | Woodgate | Coral Sea |
| Buxton | Buxton | Burrum Heads |

Woodgate is a coastal locality in the Bundaberg Region, Queensland, Australia. In the 2021 census, Woodgate had a population of 1,521 people.

There are two towns within the locality, Woodgate Beach (25.10278°S 152.56056°E) on the eastern coast of the locality (the Coral Sea) and Walkers Point (25.17000°S 152.59139°E) on the southern coast of locality (in the estuary of the Burrum River).

== Geography ==
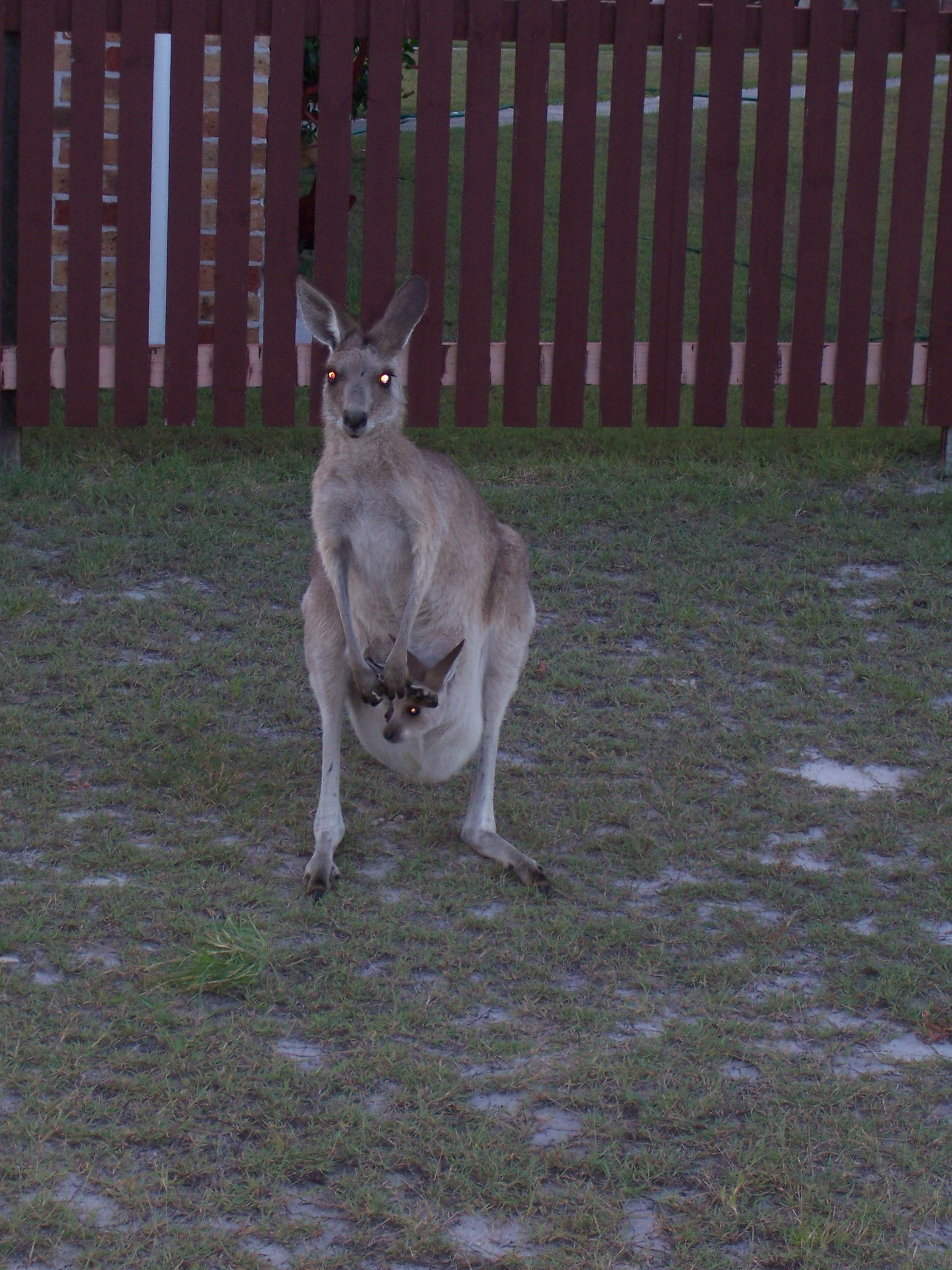
Kangaroo with joey, Woodgate

The majority of the coastline of Woodgate consists of sandy beach, making it a popular holiday destination for people who live in nearby areas of Queensland. This small seaside town called Woodgate Beach with 16 kilometres (9.9 mi) of white sandy beach with crystal clear peaceful, safe, sub tropical water is surrounded by a 20,000 hectare National Park with superb scenery, and provides a diverse range of holiday activities.

On the inland side of Woodgate lies Burrum Coast National Park. The beach itself is quite calm, being protected by K'gari (formerly known as Fraser Island).

== History ==
The Kabi group Dundaburra are traditionally connected to the area.

Woodgate State School opened in 1921 and closed in 1922.

The Woodgate Beach public library opened in 1993 with a minor refurbishment in 2009.

The Town of Woodgate Beach was previously known as the Town of Woodgate until its name was changed in 2003.

== Demographics ==
In the 2006 census, Woodgate had a population of 758 people.

In the 2011 census, Woodgate had a population of 941 people.

In the 2016 census, Woodgate had a population of 1,165 people.

In the 2021 census, Woodgate had a population of 1,521 people.

== Education ==
There are no schools in Woodgate. The nearest government primary school is Goodwood State School in neighbouring Goodwood to the west. The nearest government secondary school is Isis District State High School in Childers to the south-west.

== Amenities ==
The Bundaberg Regional Council operates a public library in the Community Centre at 1 Kangaroo Court.

There is a boat ramp on the north bank of the inlet of Hervey Bay (25.1712°S 152.5888°E) where the confluence of the Gregory River and Burrum River reaches the sea . It is managed by the Bundaberg Regional Council.
