= Horton, Queensland =

Horton
- Town
- Interactive map of Horton
- Coordinates: 25.2261°S 152.3197°E
- Country: Australia
- State: Queensland
- LGA: Bundaberg Region
- Location: 6.9 km (4.3 mi) ENE of Childers; 55.4 km (34.4 mi) SSW of Bundaberg CBD; 306 km (190 mi) N of Brisbane

Government
  - State electorate: Burnett
  - Federal division: Hinkler

Area
  - Total: 14.9 km^{2} (5.8 sq mi)

Population
  - Total: 205 (2021 census)
  - Density: 13.76/km^{2} (35.63/sq mi)
- Time zone: UTC+10:00 (AEST)
- Postcode: 4660
Localities around Horton
| North Isis | Abington | Abington |
| Doolbi | Horton | Abington |
| South Isis | South Isis | Isis River |

Horton is a rural town and locality in the Bundaberg Region, Queensland, Australia. In the 2021 census, the locality of Horton had a population of 205 people.

== Geography ==
The Bruce Highway forms the southern boundary of the locality.

== History ==
The town was possibly named after sugar planter George Horton.

A Methodist Church was opened in Horton in 1886. Due to the decline of the Horton township the church was subsequently moved to Childers. It became the Childers Uniting Church in June 1977 following the amalgamation of the Methodist Church into the Uniting Church in Australia in 1977. It is now listed on the Bundaberg Heritage Register.

The first section of the Isis railway line branched from the North Coast railway line at Goodwood. It opened to Childers on 31 October 1887 with intermediate stations at Bootharh, Horton and Doolbi. Horton railway station was at 25.2249°S 152.3150°E and has been dismantled. The line closed in 1964.

Horton State School opened about 1888. In 1900, it was renamed Doolbi State School. The school closed in 1953. It was at 204 Goodwood Road, now the site of the clubhouse of the Isis Golf Club in neighbouring Doolbi.

== Demographics ==
In the 2016 census, the locality of Horton had a population of 158 people.

In the 2021 census, the locality of Horton had a population of 205 people.

== Education ==
There are no schools in Horton. The nearest government primary school is Childers State School in Childers to the west. The nearest government secondary school is Isis District State High School, also in Childers.
