= Isis River, Queensland =

Isis River
- Suburb
- Interactive map of Isis River
- Coordinates: 25.265°S 152.3761°E
- Country: Australia
- State: Queensland
- LGA: Bundaberg Region
- Location: 9.3 km (5.8 mi) ESE of Childers; 49.6 km (30.8 mi) W of Hervey Bay; 59.9 km (37.2 mi) S of Bundaberg; 300 km (190 mi) N of Brisbane

Government
  - State electorate: Burnett
  - Federal division: Hinkler

Area
  - Total: 138.0 km^{2} (53.3 sq mi)

Population
  - Total: 100 (2021 census)
  - Density: 0.7/km^{2} (1.9/sq mi)
- Time zone: UTC+10:00 (AEST)
- Postcode: 4660
Suburbs around Isis River
Abington	Redridge	Buxton
Horton	Isis River	Cherwell
South Isis	Kullogum	Duckinwilla

Isis River is a rural locality in the Bundaberg Region, Queensland, Australia. In the 2021 census, Isis River had a population of 100 people.

== Geography ==
The Isis River (from which the locality presumably takes its name) flows through the locality entering from the south-east (South Isis) and exiting to the north-east (Buxton/Cherwell).

The Bruce Highway passes through the locality from the west (South Isis/Horton) to the east (Cherwell).

In the south of the locality is the Wongi State Forest which extends into neighbouring Kullogum and Duckinwalla.

There is a small amount of cropping, most of the land is undeveloped native vegetation.

== Demographics ==
In the 2016 census, Isis River had a population of 110 people.

In the 2021 census, Isis River had a population of 100 people.

== Education ==
There are no schools in Isis River. The nearest government primary schools are Childers State School in Childers to the west, Goodwood State School in Goodwood to the north, and Howard State School in Howard to the east. The nearest government secondary school is Isis District State High School, also in Childers.
