= South Isis =

- Suburb
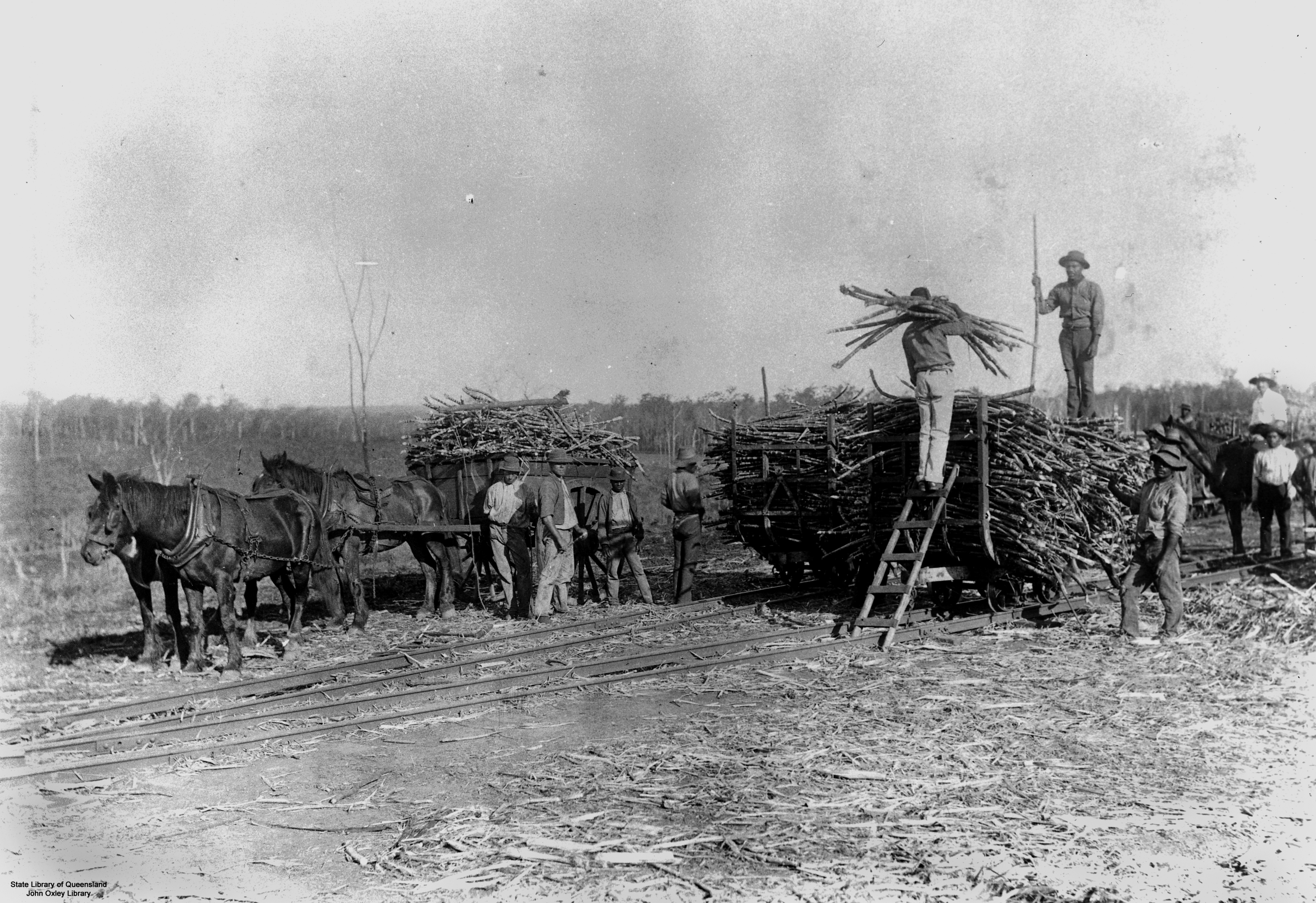
- Loading sugarcane at South Isis, circa 1900

- Interactive map of South Isis
- Coordinates: 25.2663°S 152.3052°E
- Country: Australia
- State: Queensland
- LGA: Bundaberg Region
- Location: 6.2 km (3.9 mi) SE of Childers; 56.8 km (35.3 mi) S of Bundaberg CBD; 58.1 km (36.1 mi) W of Hervey Bay; 321 km (199 mi) N of Brisbane

Government
  - State electorate: Burnett
  - Federal division: Hinkler

Area
  - Total: 35.6 km^{2} (13.7 sq mi)

Population
  - Total: 381 (2021 census)
  - Density: 10.702/km^{2} (27.72/sq mi)
- Time zone: UTC+10:00 (AEST)
- Postcode: 4660
Suburbs around South Isis
Childers	Doolbi; Horton	Isis River
Childers	South Isis	Isis River
Kullogum	Kullogum	Isis River

South Isis is a rural locality in the Bundaberg Region, Queensland, Australia. In the 2021 census, South Isis had a population of 381 people.

== Geography ==
The Bruce Highway forms most of the northern boundary of the locality, entering from the north-east (Isis River) and exiting to the north-west (Childers / Doolbi).

Oaky Creek forms the southern boundary of the locality and becomes a tributary of the Sarahana Creek at the south-east of the locality. Sarahana Creek then forms the south-eastern boundary of the locality, becoming the Isis River.

The terrain varies from 20 to 110 metres (66 to 361 ft) above sea level.

The land use in the north of the locality is predominantly a mix of rural residential housing and crop growing (mostly sugarcane). There is cane tramway in the north of the locality to transport the harvested sugarcane to the Isis Central Sugar Mill. The land use in the south of the locality is predominantly grazing on native vegetation.

== History ==
Isis South Provisional School opened on 7 February 1887. On 1 January 1909, it became Isis South State School. It closed on 9 March 1936. It was on a 5-acre (2.0 ha) site at 3 Jackson Road (25.26985°S 152.30644°E).

== Demographics ==
In the 2016 census, South Isis had a population of 313 people.

In the 2021 census, South Isis had a population of 381 people.

== Education ==
There are no schools in South Isis. The nearest government primary and secondary schools are Childers State School and Isis District State High School, both in neighbouring Childers to the north-west.
