= Woodgate Beach, Queensland =

Woodgate Beach Queensland
- Coordinates: 25.1027°S 152.5605°E
- Postcode(s): 4660
- Time zone: AEST (UTC+10:00)
- Location: 38.9 km (24 mi) NE of Childers; 55.2 km (34 mi) SE of Bundaberg CBD; 341 km (212 mi) N of Brisbane
- LGA(s): Bundaberg Region
- State electorate(s): Burnett
- Federal division(s): Hinkler

Woodgate Beach is a coastal town in the locality of Woodgate in Bundaberg Region, Queensland, Australia.

== History ==
The town's name was changed from Woodgate to Woodgate Beach on 22 August 2003.

The Woodgate Beach public library opened in 1993 with a minor refurbishment in 2009.

== Education ==
There are no schools in Woodgate. The nearest government primary school is Goodwood State School in neighbouring Goodwood to the west. The nearest government secondary school is Isis District State High School in Childers to the south-west.

== Facilities ==
The Bundaberg Regional Council operates a public library in the Community Centre at 1 Kangaroo Court.
