= Howard War Memorial =

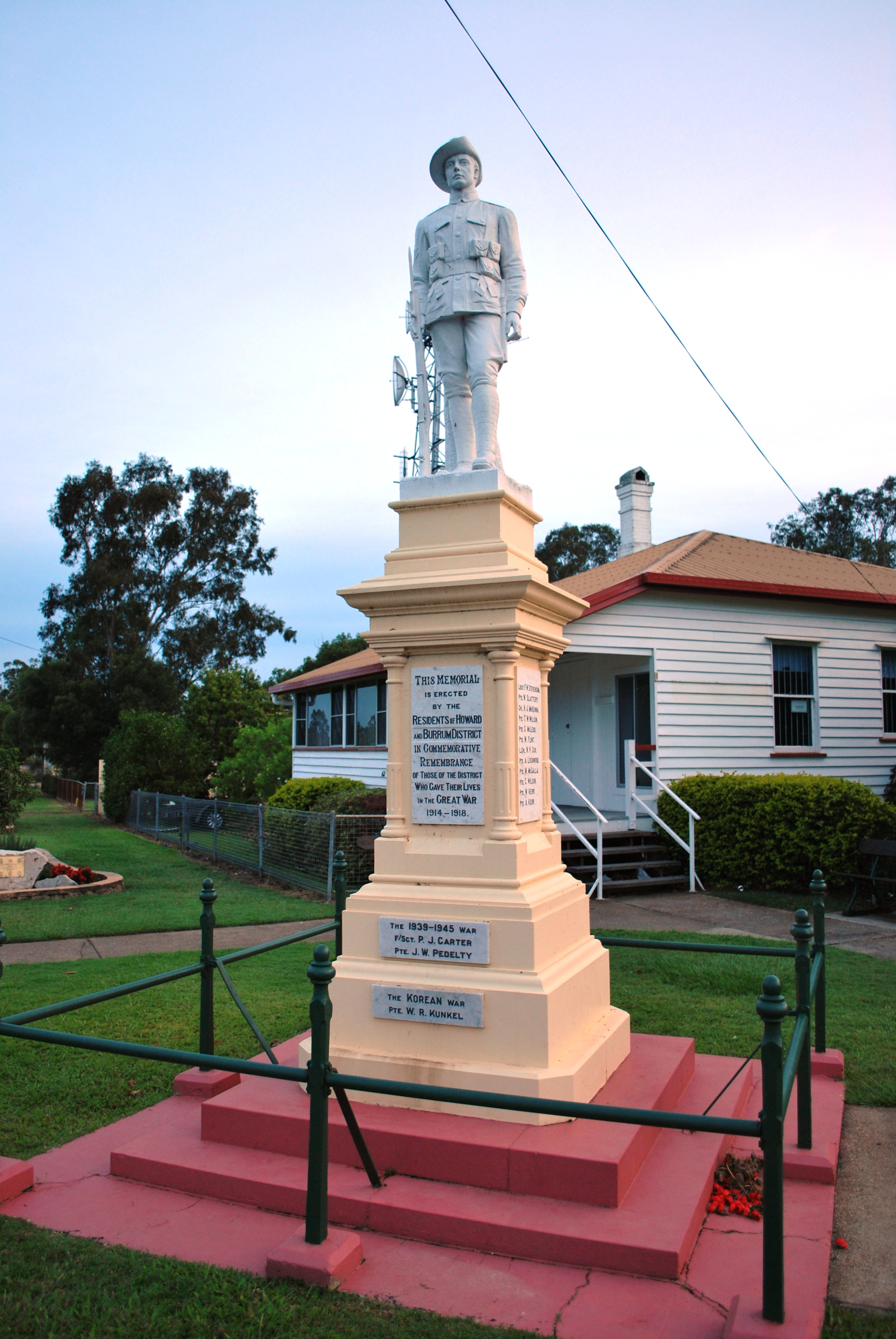
- Howard War Memorial, 2008

- Location within Queensland Location within Australia
- 25.3176°S 152.5624°E
- Location: William Street, Howard, Fraser Coast Region, Queensland, Australia

History
- Design period: 1919–1930s (interwar period)
- Built: 1921

Queensland Heritage Register
- Official name: Howard War Memorial
- Type: state heritage (built)
- Designated: 21 October 1992
- Reference no.: 600545
- Significant period: 1921– (social); 1921 (historical, fabric)
- Significant components: memorial surrounds/railings, memorial – soldier statue

Howard War Memorial is a heritage-listed memorial at William Street, Howard, Fraser Coast Region, Queensland, Australia. It was built in 1921. It was added to the Queensland Heritage Register on 21 October 1992.

== History ==
The Howard War Memorial was unveiled on the 17 December 1921 by local war hero and politician, Colonel Colin Rankin (father of Queensland's first woman Senator, Dame Annabelle Rankin). The pedestal was produced by Maryborough monumental mason, John T Satchwill, and the statue was imported from Italy. The memorial honours the 37 local soldiers who died during the First World War. Later plates honour the two soldiers who fell during the Second World War and one who fell during the Korean War.

In 1918, a Howard and Burrum district memorial committee was established to raise funds for a war memorial. They were assisted by the ladies of the Red Cross in raising approximately £300.

Australia, and Queensland in particular, had few civic monuments before the First World War. The memorials erected in its wake became our first national monuments, recording the devastating impact of the war on a young nation. Australia lost 60,000 from a population of about 4 million, representing one in five of those who served. No previous or subsequent war has made such an impact on the nation.

Even before the end of the war, memorials became a spontaneous and highly visible expression of national grief. To those who erected them, they were as sacred as grave sites, substitute graves for the Australians whose bodies lay in battlefield cemeteries in Europe and the Middle East. British policy decreed that the Empire war dead were to be buried where they fell. The word "cenotaph", commonly applied to war memorials at the time, literally means "empty tomb".

Australian war memorials are distinctive in that they commemorate not only the dead. Australians were proud that their first great national army, unlike other belligerent armies, was composed entirely of volunteers, men worthy of honour whether or not they made the supreme sacrifice. Many memorials honour all who served from a locality, not just the dead, providing valuable evidence of community involvement in the war. Such evidence is not readily obtainable from military records, or from state or national listings, where names are categorised alphabetically or by military unit.

Australian war memorials are also valuable evidence of imperial and national loyalties, at the time, not seen as conflicting; the skills of local stonemasons, metalworkers and architects; and of popular taste. In Queensland, the digger statue was the popular choice of memorial, whereas the obelisk predominated in the southern states, possibly a reflection of Queensland's larger working-class population and a lesser involvement of architects.

Many of the First World War monuments have been updated to record local involvement in later conflicts, and some have fallen victim to unsympathetic re-location and repair.

Although there are many different types of memorials in Queensland, the digger statue is the most common. It was the most popular choice of communities responsible for erecting the memorials, embodying the ANZAC spirit and representing the qualities of the ideal Australian: loyalty, courage, youth, innocence and masculinity. The digger was a phenomenon peculiar to Queensland, perhaps due to the fact that other states had followed Britain's lead and established Advisory Boards made up of architects and artists, prior to the erection of war memorials. The digger statue was not highly regarded by artists and architects who were involved in the design of relatively few Queensland memorials.

Most statues were constructed by local masonry firms, although some were by artists or imported.

The statue at Howard was imported from Italy and is unique in that no concessions have been made to the appearance of an Australian soldier. The statue is depicted in full Italian Alpino uniform and accoutrements, including badges. The demarcation of the rank of Sergeant is unique to this memorial. It is also one of only two in Queensland to include a back pack, the other being the Bundaberg War Memorial. However, newspaper reports of the unveiling described the statue as an Australian soldier.

== Description ==
The First World War Memorial is located in a prominent location facing the intersection of William and Steley Streets. It is surrounded by a low green painted fence of cast iron posts with decorative finials joined by circular rails.

The sandstone and Italian marble memorial comprises a pedestal surmounted by a digger statue.

It sits on three steps of red painted concrete which are surmounted by a base step of smooth-faced sandstone with chamfered corners. Above this are two more steps, each capped with cyma recta moulding. On the front face of each step is a leaded marble plaque.

The pedestal itself comprises recessed square plates with leaded marble plaques on each face bearing the names of the 37 local soldiers who died in the First World War, including two who died in camp. There are also leaded plates listing those who fell in later wars; two in the Second World War, and one in the Korean War. At each corner is an engaged column with Doric order capitals and bases and fluting to the lower half. These support a small cornice, capped with a larger frieze and cornice.

The digger statue stands on a base above the cornice and stands erect with the right foot forward and a tree stump for support. The life-sized statue is of Italian marble. The dress is that of an Italian-Alpino soldier, and his features are also Italian in nature.

== Heritage listing ==
Howard War Memorial was listed on the Queensland Heritage Register on 21 October 1992 having satisfied the following criteria.

The place is important in demonstrating the evolution or pattern of Queensland's history.

War Memorials are important in demonstrating the pattern of Queensland's history as they are representative of a recurrent theme that involved most communities throughout the state. They provide evidence of an era of widespread Australian patriotism and nationalism, particularly during and following the First World War.

It also has a special association with monumental mason, John T Satchwill as an example of his work.

The place demonstrates rare, uncommon or endangered aspects of Queensland's cultural heritage.

However, it is also highly significant as an example of an imported statue which was in no way modified for its Australian purchasers. Demarcation of rank is unique among soldier statues in Queensland and the inclusion of a backpack rare occurring elsewhere only on Bundaberg's war memorial. This statue is the most notably alien of all the imported statues on Queensland war memorials.

The place is important in demonstrating the principal characteristics of a particular class of cultural places.

The monuments manifest a unique documentary record and are demonstrative of popular taste in the inter-war period.

Erected in 1921, the memorial at Howard demonstrates the principal characteristics of a commemorative structure erected as an enduring record of a major historical event. This is achieved through the use of appropriate materials and design elements. As a digger statue it is representative of the most popular form of memorial in Queensland.

The place is important because of its aesthetic significance.

The Howard memorial is of aesthetic significance both as a landmark and for its high degree of workmanship and design. It occupies a prominent corner, providing a focus for the entire town.

The place has a strong or special association with a particular community or cultural group for social, cultural or spiritual reasons.

The memorial has a strong association with the community as evidence of the impact of a major historic event. It also has a special association with monumental mason, John T Satchwill as an example of his work.
