= Burrum Town, Queensland =

Burrum Town
- Suburb
- Interactive map of Burrum Town
- Coordinates: 25.3288°S 152.5872°E
- Country: Australia
- State: Queensland
- LGA: Fraser Coast Region
- Location: 24.4 km (15.2 mi) WSW of Hervey Bay; 29.2 km (18.1 mi) NNW of Maryborough; 85.5 km (53.1 mi) SSE of Bundaberg; 286 km (178 mi) S of Brisbane

Government
  - State electorate: Maryborough
  - Federal division: Hinkler

Area
  - Total: 2.4 km^{2} (0.93 sq mi)

Population
  - Total: 197 (2021 census)
  - Density: 82.1/km^{2} (213/sq mi)
- Time zone: UTC+10:00 (AEST)
- Postcode: 4659
Suburbs around Burrum Town
Howard	Burrum River	Burrum River
Howard	Burrum Town	Burgowan
Torbanlea	Torbanlea	Torbanlea

Burrum Town is a rural locality in the Fraser Coast Region, Queensland, Australia. In the 2021 census, Burrum Town had a population of 197 people.

== Geography ==
The Burrum River forms the north-western boundary.

== Demographics ==
In the 2016 census, Burrum Town had a population of 168 people.

In the 2021 census, Burrum Town had a population of 197 people.

== Education ==
There are no schools in Burrum Town. The nearest government primary school is Torbanlea State School in neighbouring Torbanlea to the south. The nearest government secondary school is Hervey Bay State High School in Pialba to the north-east.
