= Isis Junction railway station =

Former railway station in Queensland, Australia

Coordinates: 25°13′07″S 152°26′55″E

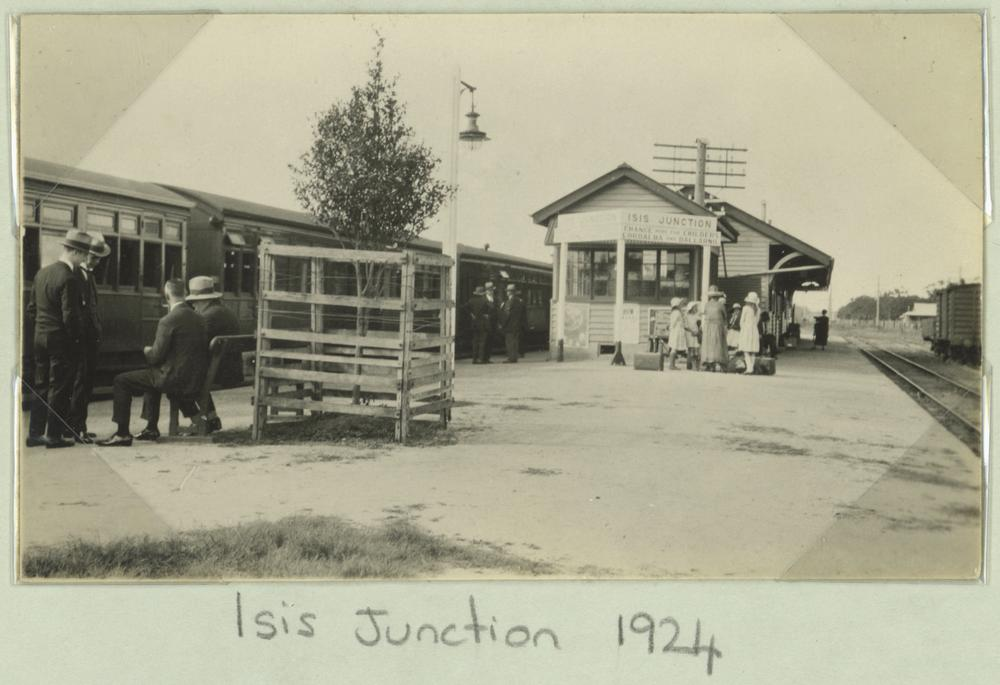
- Isis Junction railway station, 1924

General information
- Location: Buxton, Bundaberg Region, Queensland; Australia
- Lines: North Coast and Isis lines
Location

The Isis Junction railway station is a former railway station on the North Coast railway line in Buxton, Bundaberg Region, Queensland, Australia. It was the junction for the former Isis railway line that served the Shire of Isis.

== History ==
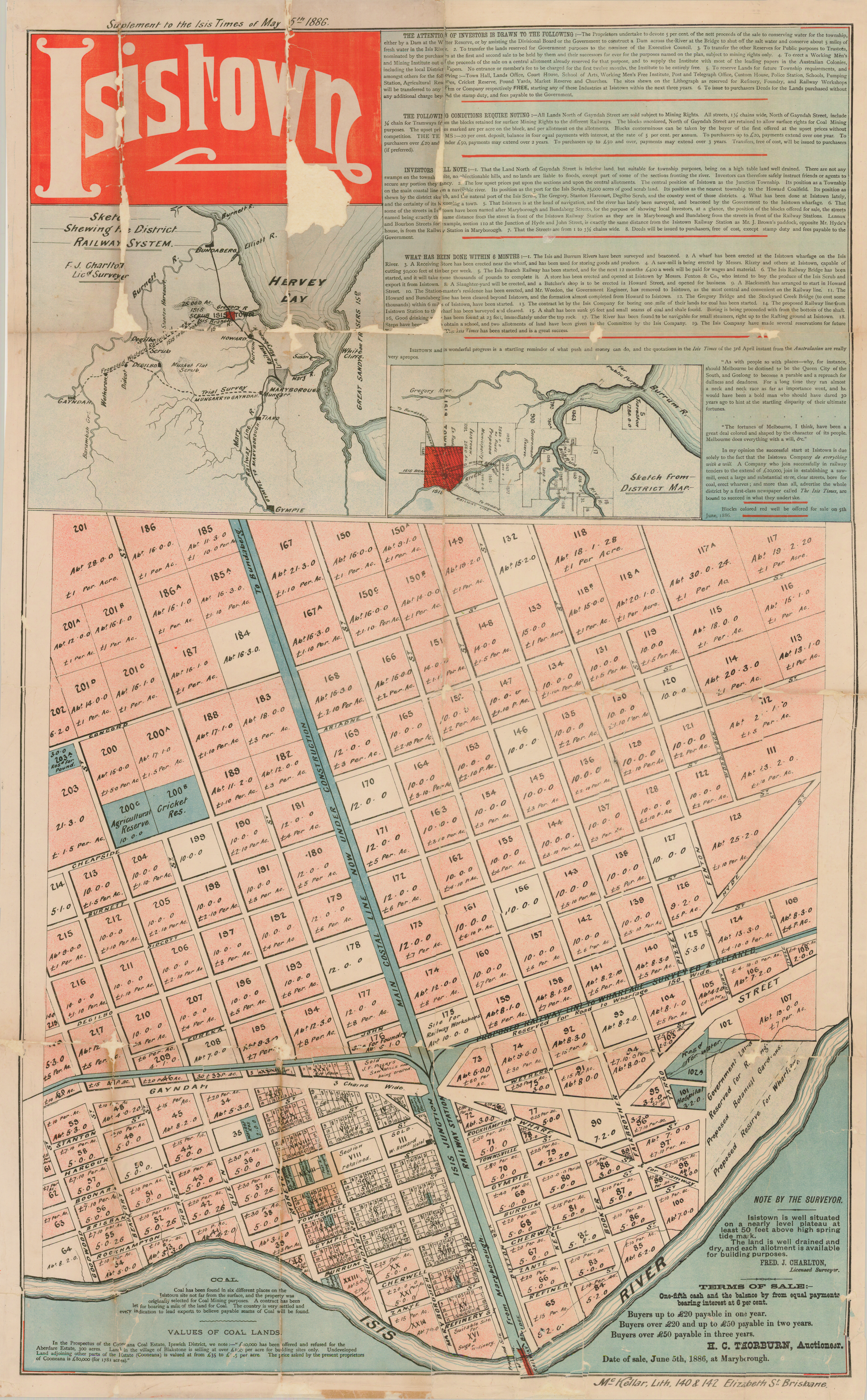
Estate map for Isistown, Isis Queensland, 1886

The name reflects its role as the junction to the Isis railway line. In turn, the name Isis comes from the nearby Isis River, which in turn is believed to be named after the Isis River in England by William Howard, a pioneer miner in the district who came from London.

The town of Isistown was surveyed by Fred. J. Charlton around the Isis Junction railway station and to the north of the Isis River (split across the present day localities of Isis River and Buxton). The first land sale of town allotments were held on 9 January 1886. The town was promoted as having many benefits including:

- being the junction of the two railway lines
- having a good river
- having excellent timber
- being in a district with rich agricultural potential
- being prospected for coal fields

A further land sale for Isistown was held on 5 June 1886, but today there is no evidence that any town was established in the area.

Isistown Provisional School opened circa 1888 and closed circa 1890.
