= Kullogum, Queensland =

Kullogum
- Suburb
- Interactive map of Kullogum
- Coordinates: 25.3330°S 152.2677°E
- Country: Australia
- State: Queensland
- LGA: Bundaberg Region
- Location: 8.1 km (5.0 mi) SW of Childers; 58.7 km (36.5 mi) SSW of Bundaberg CBD; 66.4 km (41.3 mi) W of Hervey Bay; 325 km (202 mi) N of Brisbane

Government
  - State electorates: Burnett; Maryborough
  - Federal division: Hinkler

Area
  - Total: 224.2 km^{2} (86.6 sq mi)
- Elevation: 30–270 m (98–886 ft)

Population
  - Total: 120 (2021 census)
  - Density: 0.535/km^{2} (1.39/sq mi)
- Time zone: UTC+10:00 (AEST)
- Postcode: 4660
Suburbs around Kullogum
Eureka	Apple Tree Creek; Childers	South Isis
Golden Fleece	Kullogum	Isis River
Golden Fleece	Doongul	Duckinwilla

Kullogum is a rural locality in the Bundaberg Region, Queensland, Australia. In the 2021 census, Kullogum had a population of 120 people.

== Geography ==
Most of the centre, east, and south of the locality is in the Wongi State Forest. The rest of the land use is predominantly grazing on native vegetation.

The Isis Highway enters the locality from the north (Childers) and exits to the north-west (Eureka).

Palmers Hill is in the centre of the locality (25.3405°S 152.2408°E) and rises to 188 metres (617 ft) above sea level.

== History ==
In 1877, 8,300 acres (3,400 ha) of land were resumed from the Kullugum pastoral run to establish smaller farms. The land was offered for selection on 17 April 1877.

== Demographics ==
In the 2016 census, Kullogum had a population of 118 people.

In the 2021 census, Kullogum had a population of 120 people.

== Education ==
There are no schools in Kullogum. The nearest government primary schools are Childers State School in neighbouring Childers to the north and Dallarnil State School in Dallarnil to the west. The nearest government secondary school is Isis District State High School in Childers.
