= Burrum Heads =

- Town
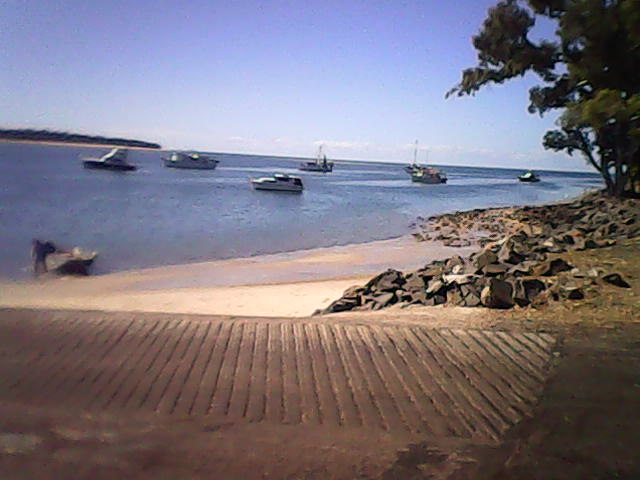
- View from the Burrum Heads boat ramp, 2016

- Interactive map of Burrum Heads
- Coordinates: 25.1841°S 152.6138°E
- Country: Australia
- State: Queensland
- LGA: Fraser Coast Region
- Location: 25.2 km (15.7 mi) NW of Hervey Bay; 46.7 km (29.0 mi) N of Maryborough; 104 km (65 mi) SE of Bundaberg; 316 km (196 mi) N of Brisbane

Government
  - State electorates: Maryborough; Burnett
  - Federal division: Hinkler

Area
  - Total: 66.6 km^{2} (25.7 sq mi)

Population
  - Total: 2,538 (2021 census)
  - Density: 38.11/km^{2} (98.70/sq mi)
- Time zone: UTC+10:00 (AEST)
- Postcode: 4659
Localities around Burrum Heads
Buxton	Woodgate	Coral Sea
Cherwell	Burrum Heads	Coral Sea
Burrum River	Beelbi Creek	Toogoom

Burrum Heads is a coastal town and locality in the Fraser Coast Region, Queensland, Australia. In the 2021 census, the locality of Burrum Heads had a population of 2,538 people.

== Geography ==
The waters of Hervey Bay form the north-eastern and eastern boundary. The Burrum River forms the western, north-western and northern boundaries, while Beelbi Creek forms the south-eastern boundary.

The Burrum River section of the Burrum Coast National Park occupies over half the area of this locality.

The new Great Sandy Marine Park Zoning Plan commenced 21 May 2024, and encompasses parts of the Burrum River system in this locality. The Gregory Islands (25.10°S 152.34°E) are included in this zoning.

The Isis River, Gregory River and Burrum River share a river mouth. Early maps of the location show the mouth of the river as the Burrum River. However modern maps sometimes name the mouth of the river as the Isis River.

== History ==
The aboriginal name for the southern head of the Burrum River was Kolebore.

The Barbara and Jane, a 44-ton stern-wheel steamer commenced navigating the Burrum River in 1877 to transport coal to Maryborough from the Burrum coalfields. The Burrum coalfields were situated "about 18 miles from the mouth of the Burrum River," said the 1903 Australian Handbook, "the bar at the entrance is sand and shale. The depth at high water is about 14 feet, with safe anchorage and deep water inside. Vessels of 8 feet draught can run up about.6 miles to the junction at the Isis River, which flows into the Burrum. If the channel of the Burrum Bar were deepened to, say, 8 feet at low water, it is said it would be one of the most useful harbours in the Colony."

Burrum Heads was originally called Traviston after the original owner Robert Travis. Traviston was renamed Burrum Heads in 1960, which takes its name from the Burrum River, which in turn is a word in the Kabi language meaning rocks interrupting river flow.

The Burrum Heads public library opened in 1987 and underwent a major refurbishment in 2013.

The opening of the Toogoom to Burrum Heads section of the Hervey Bay-Burrum Heads Road, by Hon W.A.M. Gunn M.L.A., Minister for Main Roads, was on 26 April 1989.

In December 1991, Hervey Bay Uniting Church relocated a timber church building to Burrum Heads to be used for Uniting Church services, but also available for use by other denominations.

== Demographics ==
Progression of the population of the locality of Burrum Heads
Census	Population	Ref.
2011 census	1,737	
2016 census	2,067	
2021 census	2,538	

== Education ==
There are no schools in Burrum Heads. The nearest government primary school is Torbanlea State School in Torbanlea to the south. The nearest government secondary school is Hervey Bay State High School in Pialba to the south-east.

== Attractions ==
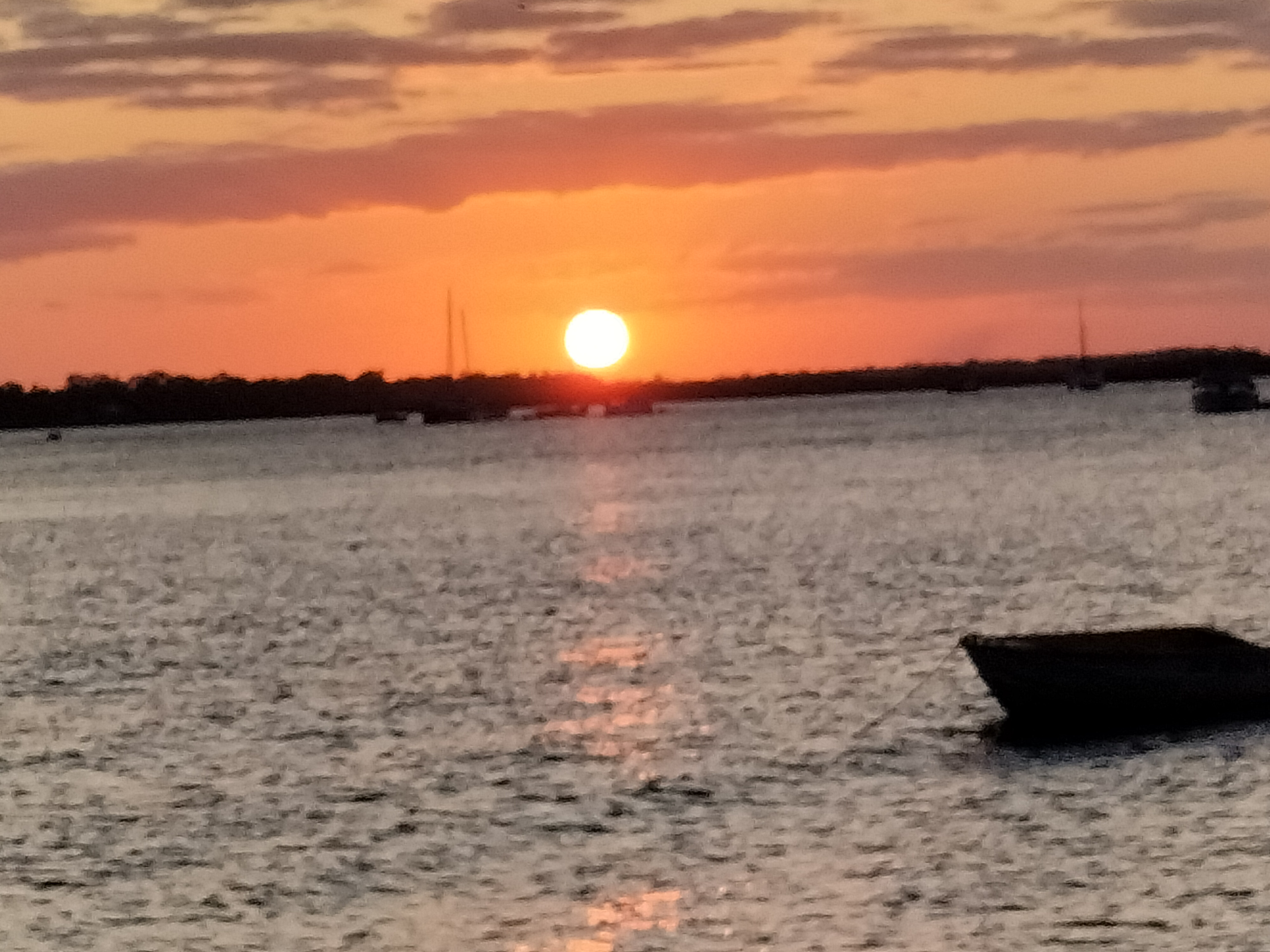
Sunset at Burrum Heads, Queensland

The town is a relaxed coastal community that welcomes tourists, many of whom enjoy fishing and boating in the locality.

The Burrum Heads Lion Park Boat Ramp (25.1843°S 152.6079°E) is a popular place to watch the sun set across the Isis River towards Walkers Point.

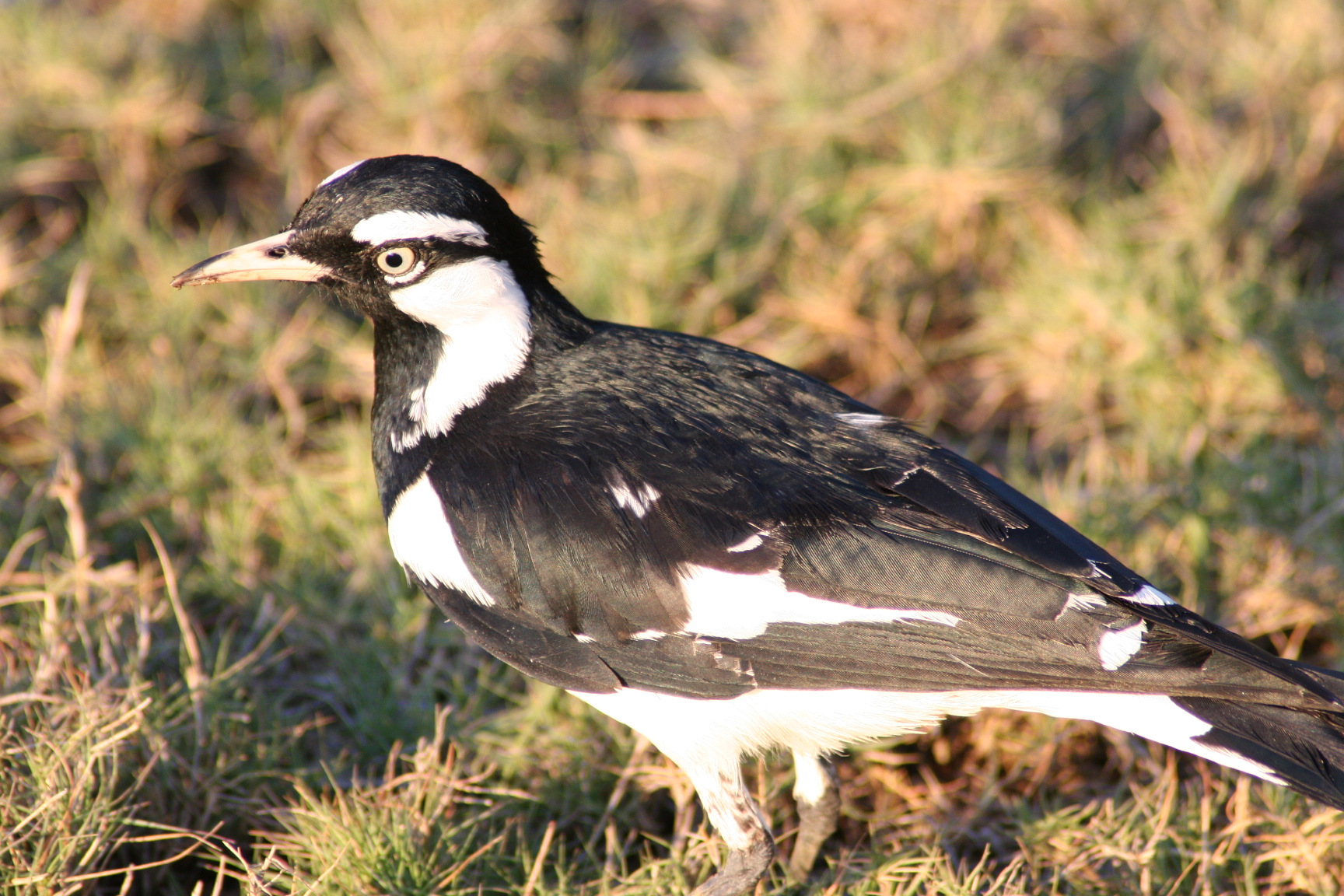
Male Magpie-lark (Grallina cyanoleuca) in South East Queensland, Australia. 2005 Nigel Jacques (Kris).

The national park and marine park are popular for bird watching.

In Traviston Park on the corner of Burrum Street and Bushnell Road (25.1902°S 152.6216°E) there is a bush chapel dedicated to those lives lost at sea, which was originally a Commercial Fishermen's project for the 1988 bicentenary. It was reconstructed after the 2010–2011 Queensland floods.

== Amenities ==
The Fraser Coast Regional Council operates a public library at 22 Burrum Heads Road (25.1854°S 152.6132°E). The library has public Wi-Fi available.

The Burrum Heads Bowls Club is at 189-201 Burrum Heads Road (25.2018°S 152.6103°E). Adjacent to the Bowls Club are the SES, Tennis Courts, and club rooms of the Burrum Heads Amateur Fshing Club Inc.

Burrum Heads Medical Centre, Burrum Heads Pharmacy and a pathology practice are located at Burrum Heads Shopping Centre, 2 Burrum Heads Road, beside the petrol station (25.1918°S 152.6116°E). The Burrum Heads Neighbourhood Centre and a hair salon are located in the same shopping centre.

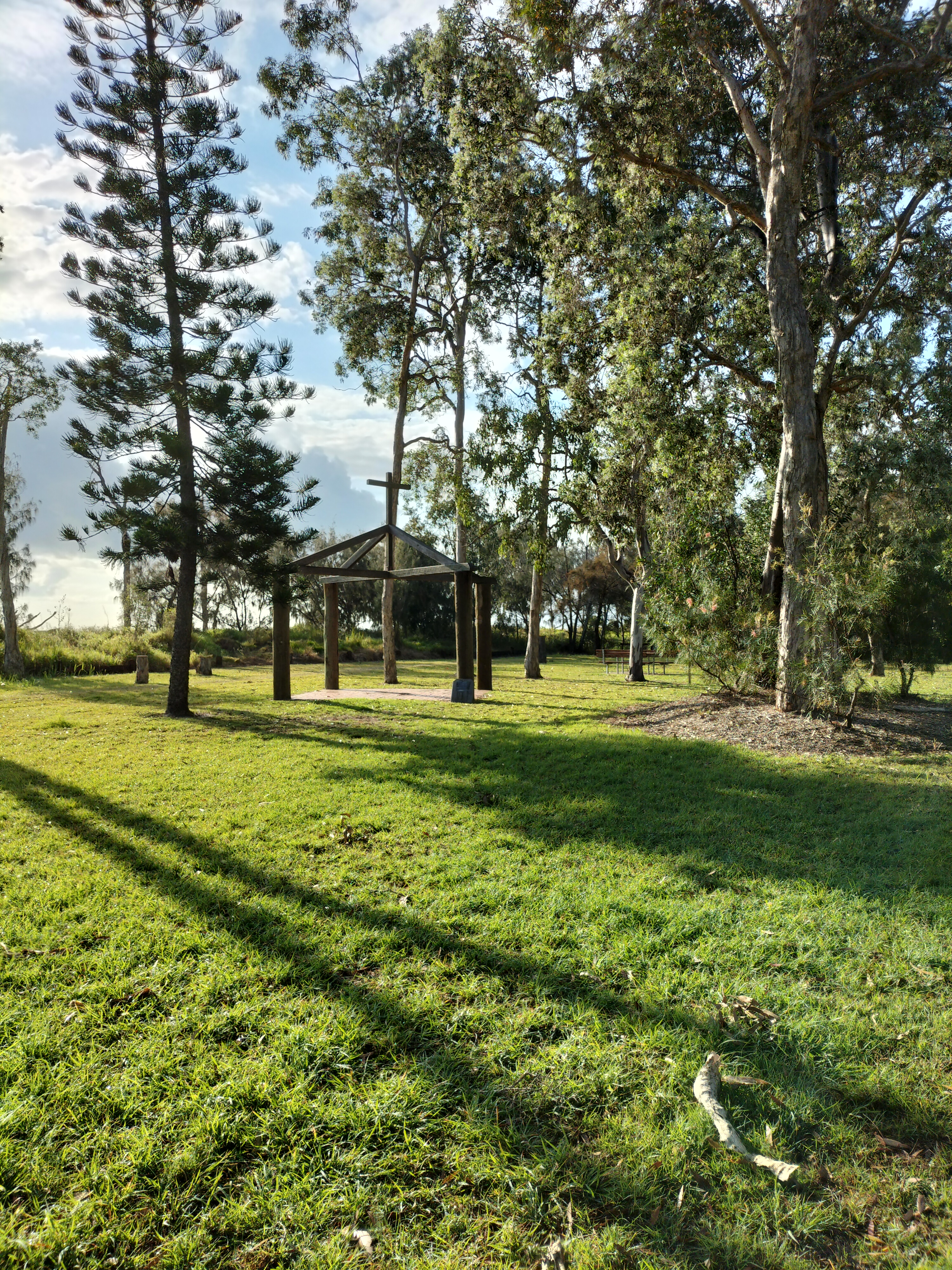
Bush Chapel, Traviston Park, Burrum Heads, Queensland. 2024.

Burrum Heads Christian Community Church is at 16 Burrum Heads Road (corner Howard Street, 25.1850°S 152.6137°E). It is part of the Hervey Bay Uniting Church. It is also used for services by the Burrum Heads Anglican Church and the St Peter the Fisherman Catholic Community.

Burrum Heads Community Hall is at 43 Howard Street (25.1853°S 152.6133°E). In front of the hall is the Burrum Heads War Memorial.

Local shops are located in Burrum Street. The licensed post office is located in the FoodWorks store.

The Burrum Heads Rural Fire Brigade is at 34 Bushnell Road (25.1918°S 152.6210°E). The Weekly Siren Test is on Monday mornings at 8 am.

The Fraser Regional Council provides three boat ramps giving access to the mouth of the Burrum River:

- at the western end of Burrum Street with a floating jetty and breakwater (25.1840°S 152.6071°E)
- at the northern end of Ross Street with a pontoon (25.1835°S 152.6099°E)
- at the northern end of Burrum Heads Road (25.1833°S 152.6148°E)

The Burrum Heads boardwalk along the foreshore was officially opened by Fraser Coast mayor George Seymour in June 2021.
