= Doolbi, Queensland =

Doolbi
- Suburb
- Interactive map of Doolbi
- Coordinates: 25.2302°S 152.3038°E
- Country: Australia
- State: Queensland
- LGA: Bundaberg Region
- Location: 4.7 km (2.9 mi) W of Childers; 52.1 km (32.4 mi) S of Bundaberg; 311 km (193 mi) N of Brisbane

Government
  - State electorate: Burnett
  - Federal division: Hinkler

Area
  - Total: 5.7 km^{2} (2.2 sq mi)

Population
  - Total: 101 (2021 census)
  - Density: 17.72/km^{2} (45.9/sq mi)
- Time zone: UTC+10:00 (AEST)
- Postcode: 4660
Suburbs around Doolbi
Childers	North Isis	Horton
Childers	Doolbi	Horton
Childers	South Isis	Horton

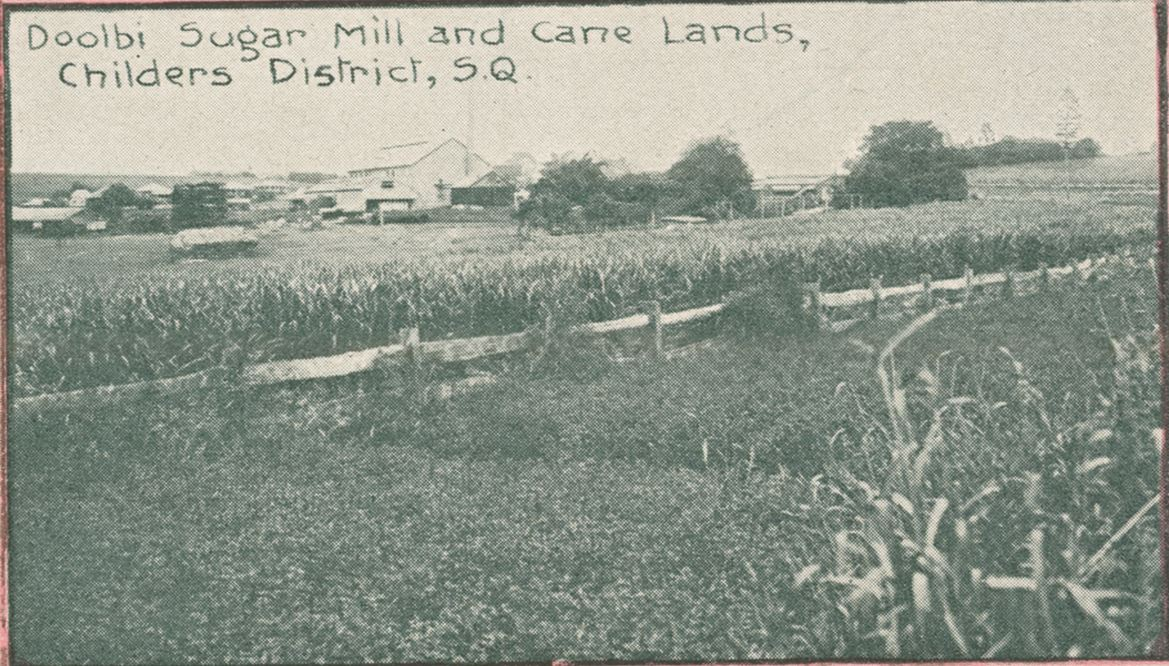
Doolbi Sugar Mill, 1914

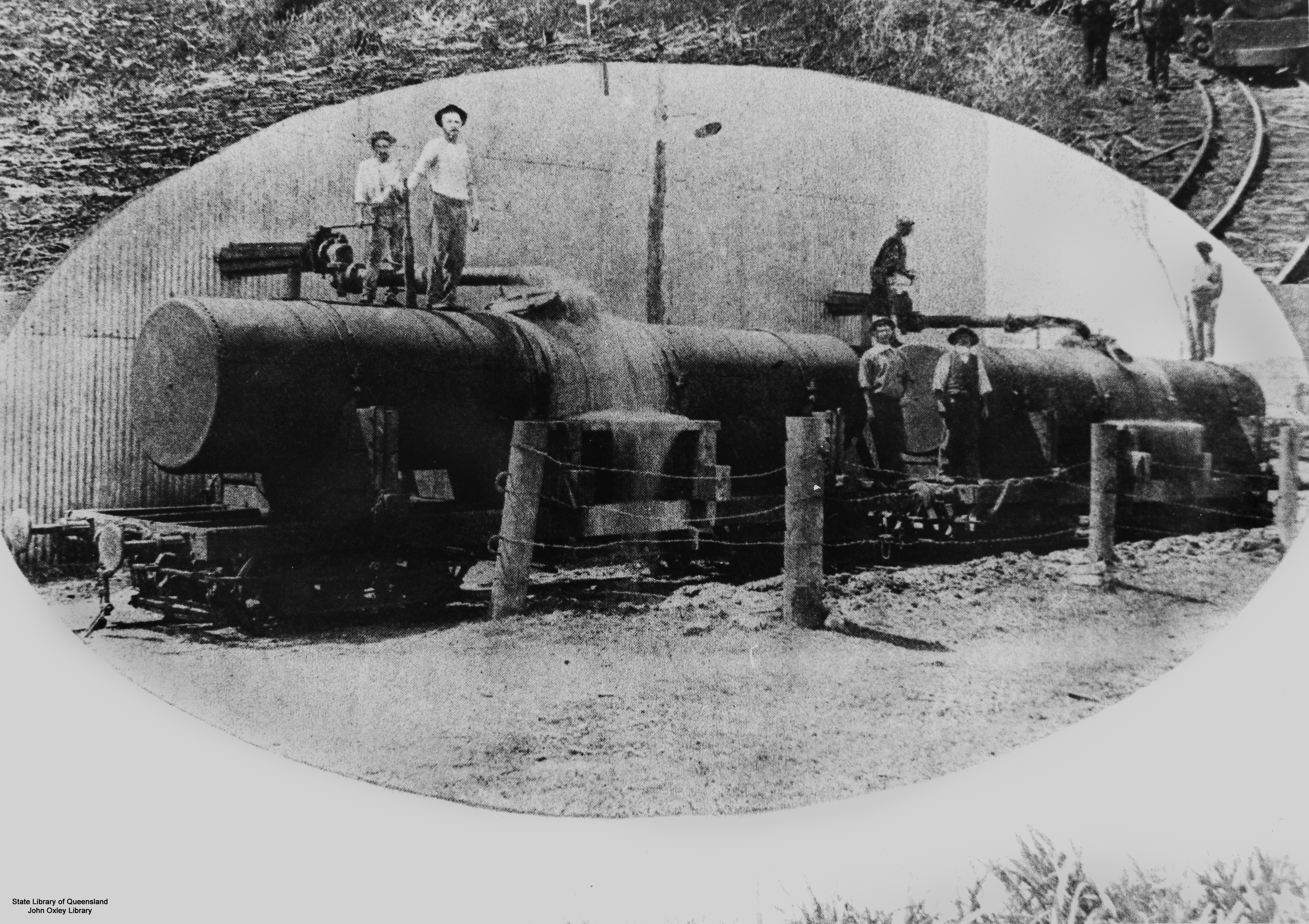
Loading juice tankers at Doolbi Sugar Mill near Childers, 1899

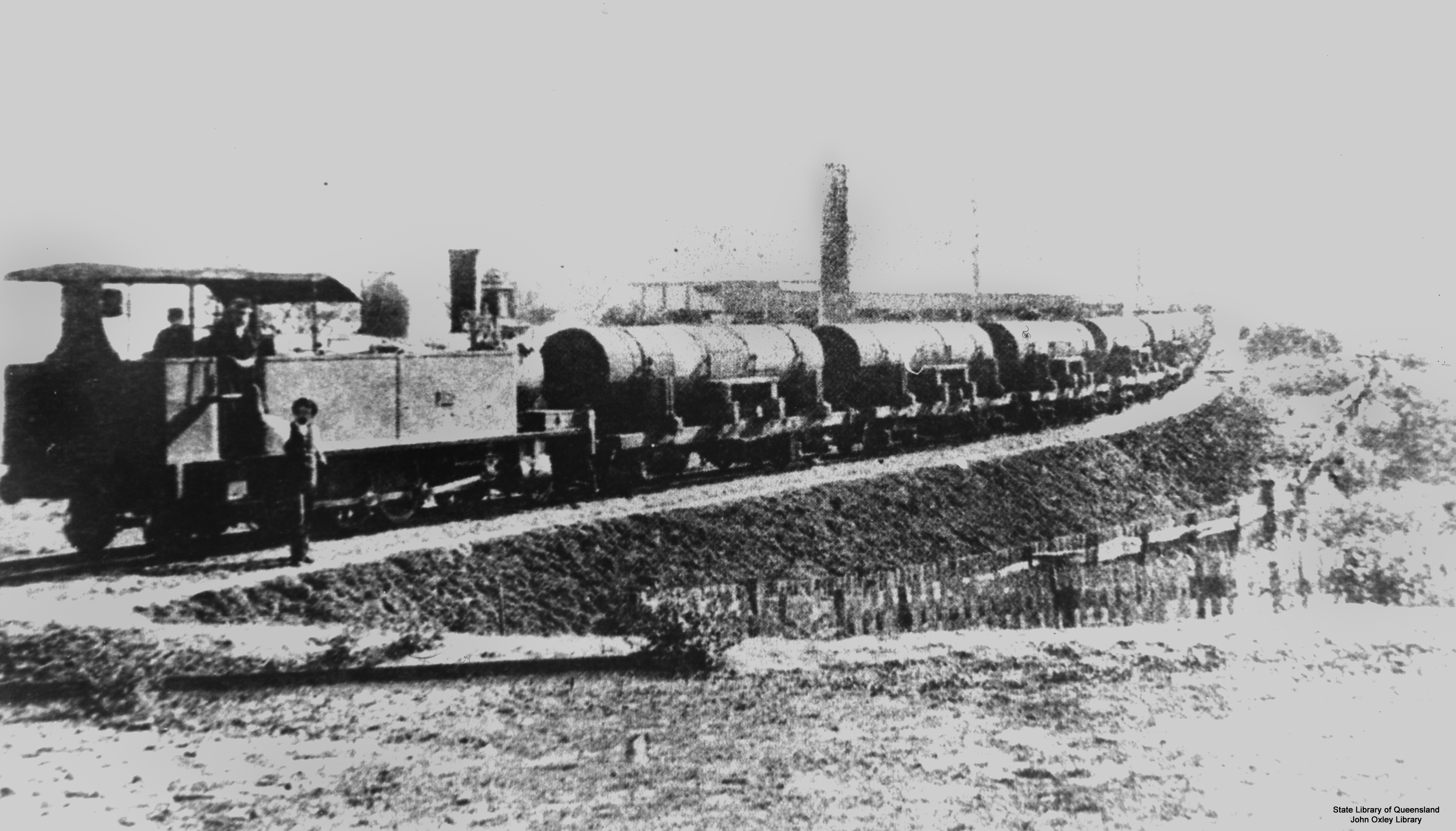
Sugar cane juice train from Doolbi to Yengarie, early 1890s

Doolbi is a rural locality in the Bundaberg Region, Queensland, Australia. In the 2021 census, Doolbi had a population of 101 people.

== Geography ==
Located just to the east of the town of Childers, Doolbi is bordered to the south by the Bruce Highway. The land in Doolbi is almost entirely used for farming with a small area of residential housing and the Isis Golf Course in the centre of the locality; there is no commercial development.

== History ==
In 1890 the first sugar cane crushing mill in the Isis district was established at Doolbi. The mill produced juice, which was then taken to Yengarie for processing into sugar. In 1900, the Doolbi mill was upgraded to produce sugar. As more sugar mills opened in the district, there was not enough cane to keep them all profitable and the Doolbi mill closed in 1924. The mill was in the south-western corner of the present Isis Golf Course (25.231°S 152.300°E) and an old brick chimney is still visible.

Horton State School opened circa 1888. In 1900, it was renamed Doolbi State School. It closed in 1953. It was at 204 Goodwood Road (25.2279°S 152.3046°E), now the site of the clubhouse of the Isis Golf Club.

== Demographics ==
In the 2016 census, Doolbi had a population of 115 people.

In the 2021 census, Doolbi had a population of 101 people.

== Education ==
There are no schools in Doolbi. The nearest primary and secondary schools are Childers State School and Isis District State High School, both in neighbouring Childers to the west.
