= Burrum River, Queensland =

Burrum River
- Suburb
- Interactive map of Burrum River
- Coordinates: 25.2705°S 152.5899°E
- Country: Australia
- State: Queensland
- LGA: Fraser Coast Region
- Location: 24.5 km (15.2 mi) W of Hervey Bay; 34.2 km (21.3 mi) NNW of Maryborough; 91.6 km (56.9 mi) SSE of Bundaberg; 291 km (181 mi) S of Brisbane

Government
  - State electorate: Maryborough
  - Federal division: Hinkler

Area
  - Total: 54.1 km^{2} (20.9 sq mi)

Population
  - Total: 259 (2021 census)
  - Density: 4.787/km^{2} (12.40/sq mi)
- Time zone: UTC+10:00 (AEST)
- Postcode: 4659
Suburbs around Burrum River
Buxton; Cherwell	Burrum Heads	Burrum Heads
Pacific Haven	Burrum River	Beelbi Creek
Howard	Burrum Town; Torbanlea	Burgowan

Burrum River is a rural locality in the Fraser Coast Region, Queensland, Australia. In the 2021 census, Burrum River had a population of 259 people.

== Demographics ==
In the 2016 census, Burrum River had a population of 253 people.

In the 2021 census, Burrum River had a population of 259 people.

== Education ==
There are no schools in Burrum River . The nearest government primary school is Torbanlea State School in neighbouring Torbanlea to the south. The nearest government secondary school is Hervey Bay State High School in Pialba to the east.
