= Allan Slab Hut =

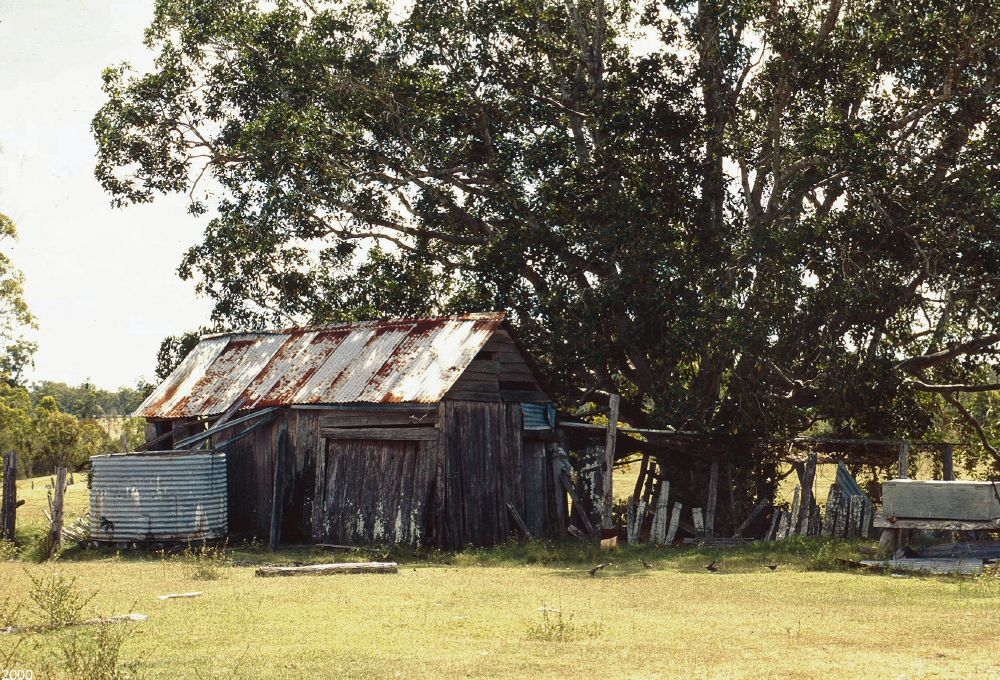
- Allan Slab Hut, 2000

- Location within Queensland Location within Australia
- 25.4452°S 152.5333°E
- Location: Warrah Road, Duckinwilla, Fraser Coast Region, Queensland, Australia

History
- Design period: 1900 - 1914 (early 20th century)
- Built: c. 1900

Queensland Heritage Register
- Official name: Allan Slab Hut, Price Property
- Type: state heritage (built)
- Designated: 28 April 2000
- Reference no.: 601934
- Significant period: c. 1900 (fabric); 1900-1936 (historical)
- Significant components: tank - water, trees/plantings, hut/shack, fencing

Allan Slab Hut is a heritage-listed slab hut at Warrah Road, Duckinwilla, Fraser Coast Region, Queensland, Australia. It was built c. 1900. It is also known as Price Property. It was added to the Queensland Heritage Register on 28 April 2000.

== History ==
The Allan Slab Hut at Doongul Creek, via Torbanlea is a basic, hand-built hardwood structure built sometime in the first decade of the twentieth century by Henry Price, an emigrant miner from Wales, as the home for his family.

Henry Price arrived by ship in Maryborough sometime around the turn of the century and was followed some time later by his wife Esther Ann Price and her daughter Blodwen Comely Evans Price. It is believed that the family squatted on their small selection before formally selecting the land in 1913. The possibilities for self sufficiency offered by this selection of one hundred and sixty five acres and three roods, would have brought greater economic stability and autonomy than Esther Price had ever known. Illiterate and twice widowed by mining accidents in Wales, Esther married Henry Price in her middle age and emigrated to Australia with her daughter. Their lives were typical of poor migrants who came to Australia and eked out a living on small marginal selections.

The slab hut was the first house the family had ever owned and Henry built it himself from hardwood felled, or already fallen, on the property, possibly ironbark or stringybark. Esther was a midwife and in Wales had lived in a tiny urban cottage with her brother and five lodgers. She had to acquire a range of new skills to deal with life in rural Queensland. She cooked outdoors at an uncovered hearth and worked five acres of market gardens to raise a small income.

Her daughter, Blodwen married Archibald Allan, a miner from Howard in 1912 and raised her surviving five children on the property in a former school building, brought to the site from Upper Doongul sometime in the 1920s. A number of the children were born on the property with Esther in attendance as midwife. Archibald Allan travelled 12 miles (19 km) by bicycle to work ten- and twelve-hour days, six days a week in nearby coal mines to support the family after Henry Price's death. Esther and Blodwen sold vegetables in Howard to supplement his wages which were barely enough to feed the family and the sons hunted for wild birds to provide some protein in their diet. Esther was known in the district as a "wise woman", someone who would assist women in having their babies and it is likely that she traded her midwifery skills for other goods or services. Midwives, both trained and untrained, provided the primary care for birthing women in Queensland until the 1930s and homebirthing continued as a more common practice in rural areas than urban.

The mines in the Torbanlea district were a source of opportunity for migrants and yet the conditions for miners were such that financial security was still difficult to attain. Coal was first discovered in the Burrum River region in 1863 and mining was well underway by the turn of the century. There were three producing mines - Burrum, Riverbank and Torbanlea, which in 1900 produced about one fifth of the Colony's total production. The Burrum Colliery run by Queensland Collieries Company Limited was by far the biggest operation in the district and was the stimulus for the founding of the town of Howard. The managing Rankin family had instituted a rule of "paternal despotism" and the fine house "Brooklyn" that the company built for them in Howard stands in stark contrast to the hand-built timber hut of the Allan family.

The Burrum coal mines were the last to be unionised in Queensland, conditions were notoriously bad and average wages were a shilling a day. Miners were paid by the ton, used pick and shovel and were never certain that they would have work the next day. Mining was the only local source of employment and the mine operators dictated the terms of employment. A small number of favoured permanent miners were provided with a miner's hut, a four-roomed stringybark cottage, of which there were fourteen in Torbanlea. Families had an average of eleven children and whilst most miners usually had only one meal a day, they endeavoured to provide two meals a day for their children.

In this context, the construction of the slab hut was something of an achievement. The building method is an improvised version of fencing construction techniques used to construct a basic dwelling of hardwood slabs nailed and wired to posts and rails. It demonstrates the family's need to make do with what they could find or afford, rather than reflecting a tradition of craftmanship or even bush carpentry. Many mining families in the district lived in dwellings constructed of posts, flattened kerosene tins and hessian sacks and strained economic circumstances meant that many families were not able to hold on to their selections. In fact, the Allan family property is now an isolated piece of freehold land within an area of former selections that reverted to Crown land when previous owners were unable to sustain a living. The resilience and tenacity that was necessary for the Allan and Price families to be able to hang on to their selection and indeed consolidate and develop it, is demonstrated by the length of time that the hut was used as a dwelling.

Esther Price lived in the slab hut until she died in 1936. She planted a fig tree that now shelters the hut, which is situated amongst the remnant evidence of the orchards and market gardens that once surrounded it. Three other trees have been planted on the property to commemorate members of the family, two figs and a crow's ash. The slab hut has subsequently been used as a fowlhouse and for general storage and is currently not used.

== Description ==
The Allan Slab Hut is a small structure, approximately three metres by four metres in plan, located on a property in the vicinity of Doongul Creek, west of Torbanlea. It has a simple rectangular form, a pitched roof and a lean-to addition on the northern side. A large fig tree is located to the north, along with remnants of former fences and hitching rails.

The walls are constructed of vertical hardwood slabs that have been shaped with an axe or adze. The slabs have been dressed at the top and bottom to conform to a regular depth and are connected to top and bottom plates with either nails or lengths of twisted wire. Rails have been checked into round corner posts and there is also a central round post in each of the long sides of the hut. The floor is formed from ant-bed and although now covered with dust, is clearly discernible. An entry door is located on the eastern wall, it has a fanlight space above that is covered with corrugated iron. In the eastern end of the southern wall the slabs have been cut at about two-thirds height to form a long window-like opening. This has now been boarded up with horizontal boards. A galvanised, corrugated iron water tank is also situated against the southern wall.

The corrugated iron sheeting and roof battens have been replaced, however, some of the roof structure consists of hewn rafters. The gable ends are infilled with horizontal timber boards. The lean-to on the northern side also appears to be more recent. It is roughly constructed of a mixture of round and hewn rafters. The plate supporting the roof structure has been simply nailed or wired to the slab wall and the other edge of the roof is supported by three large round timber posts. The western end of the lean-to space has been enclosed with horizontal sheets of corrugated iron and the northern wall is enclosed with chicken wire.

An exterior hearth formed of a semi-circle of river stones located at the western end of the hut is now covered with dirt and can only be seen in times of heavy rain. Beyond the fig tree on the northern side is a small waterhole. The former orchard area lies beyond this, with a single Chinese Date tree surviving.

== Heritage listing ==
Allan Slab Hut was listed on the Queensland Heritage Register on 28 April 2000 having satisfied the following criteria.

The place is important in demonstrating the evolution or pattern of Queensland's history.

The Allan Slab Hut is important in demonstrating the evolution and pattern of Queensland's history, representing the continuity of pioneering life in rural Queensland into the twentieth century. The hut provides evidence of the harsh and basic living conditions and improvised building techniques and survival tactics employed by settlers of the Burrum region.

The place demonstrates rare, uncommon or endangered aspects of Queensland's cultural heritage.

As a surviving example of a slab building constructed using primitive building techniques and erected in the early twentieth century, the Allan Slab Hut demonstrates rare, uncommon and endangered aspects of Queensland's cultural heritage.

The place is important because of its aesthetic significance.

The Allan Slab Hut, together with the large adjacent fig tree, has aesthetic significance for its qualities as a ruin and integral part of its rustic setting, evocative of past agricultural and domestic activities.

The place has a strong or special association with a particular community or cultural group for social, cultural or spiritual reasons.

The place has a strong association with impoverished mining families of the Burrum region, reflecting the struggle and hardship experienced by this community as they toiled to establish viable lives for themselves.
