= Isis railway line =

Former railway line in Queensland

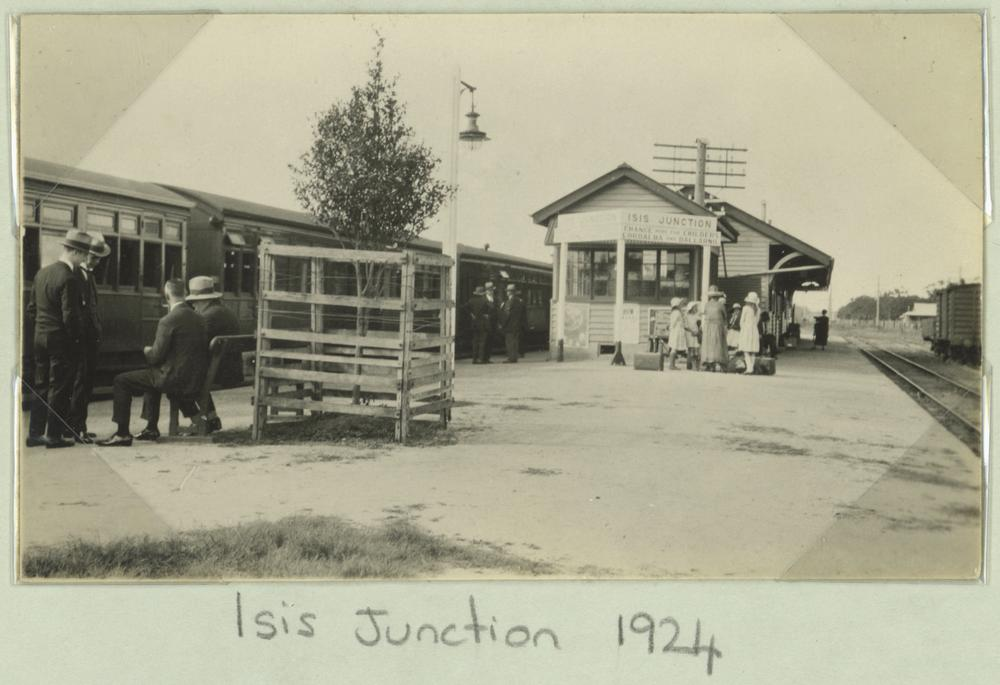
Isis Junction station in 1924

The Isis Branch Railway Line was a narrow gauge railway line in the present-day Bundaberg Region and North Burnett Region, Queensland, Australia. It connected Isis Junction on the North Coast railway line with the town of Dallarnil via the town of Childers and Cordalba. The line opened to Childers in 1887, to Cordabla in 1896, and to Dallarnil in 1909. The third section from Cordalba to Dallarnil closed in 1955 and the first two sections to Childers closed in 1964.

== History ==
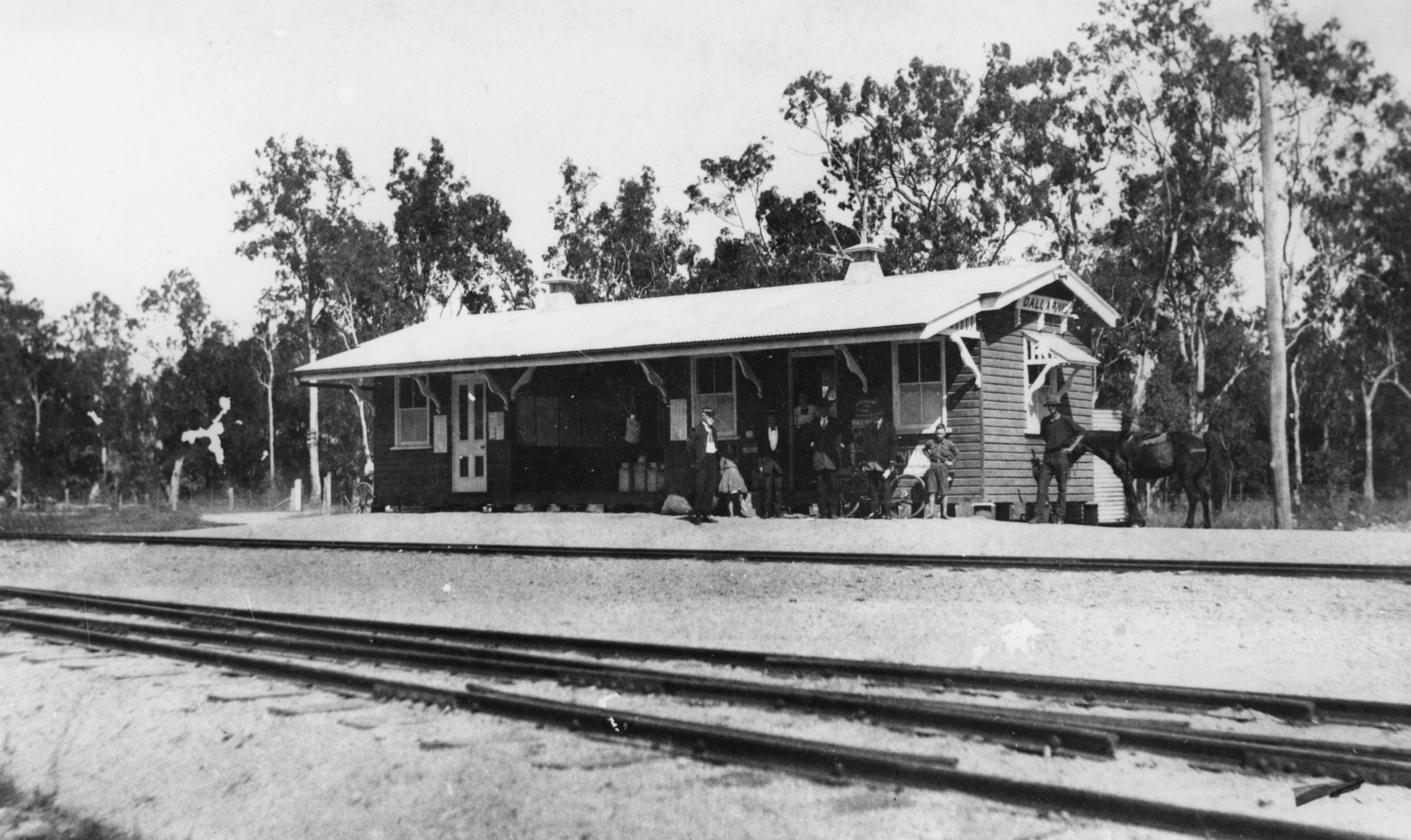
Dallarnil railway station

The North Coast line north from Brisbane, reached Maryborough in August 1881, Howard in March 1883 and Goodwood, to the south of Bundaberg, in August 1887. The Isis branch railway line was approved for construction by the Parliament of Queensland in September 1885.

The first section branched in a westerly direction from the North Coast line south of Goodwood at Isis Junction. Opened on 31 October 1887, Childers formed at the terminus and stops were established en route at Bootharh, Horton and Doolbi. The Childers station site is now part of the Isis District State High School grounds. The line enabled development of sugarcane production in the region and a short extension northwest via Huxley, Lynwood and Kowbi to Cordalba opened on 1 June 1896. Kowbi was originally named Hapsburg, but following a large upswell of Anti-German sentiment in Australia after World War I it was changed to the local Aboriginal name for "sugar" . The line serviced early sugar mills at Knockroe (near Kowbi), Huxley and Doolbi until they were taken over by the Isis Central Mill.

Another fifty kilometre extension southwest to Dallarnil was approved in December 1909 and opened on 6 May 1913. En route stops were built at Thynne, Marule, Junien, Booyal, Munderbong, Tawah, Stanton and Kukar. However, much of the area was infertile and the prospect of agricultural development was overestimated. Small quantities of sugarcane, railway sleepers, cream, lime and cattle were carried but only in spasmodic fashion.

Two trains a week were enough to meet the low volume of traffic and the service beyond Cordalba ceased on 1 July 1955. The Isis Central Mill purchased the Cordalba-Dallarnil section for intended conversion to 2 feet tramway but road transport was preferred. The rest of the line closed on 1 July 1964 in response to transport of bulk sugar by road and sugarcane by mill owned tramways.

== See also ==
- Rail transport in Queensland
