= Shire of Howard =

Local government area of Queensland, Australia

Coordinates: 25.3245°S 152.557°E

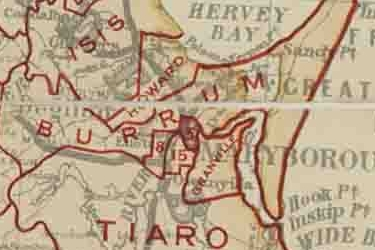
Map of Howard Division and adjacent local government areas, March 1902. Legend: Maryborough Municipality (3), Antigua Division (8), Tinana Division (15)

The Shire of Howard is a former local government area in the Wide Bay–Burnett area of Queensland, Australia, centred on the town of Howard.

== History ==
On 11 November 1879, the Burrum Division was created as one of 74 divisions within Queensland under the Divisional Boards Act 1879. On 1 January 1887, part of the Burrum Division was excised to create the Isis Division. On 30 June 1900, part of the Isis Division was excised to create the Howard Division.

With the passage of the Local Authorities Act 1902, the Howard Division became the Shire of Howard on 31 March 1903.

The Shire of Howard was abolished on 15 Feb 1917 to become parts of Burrum and Woocoo Shires.

== Chairmen ==
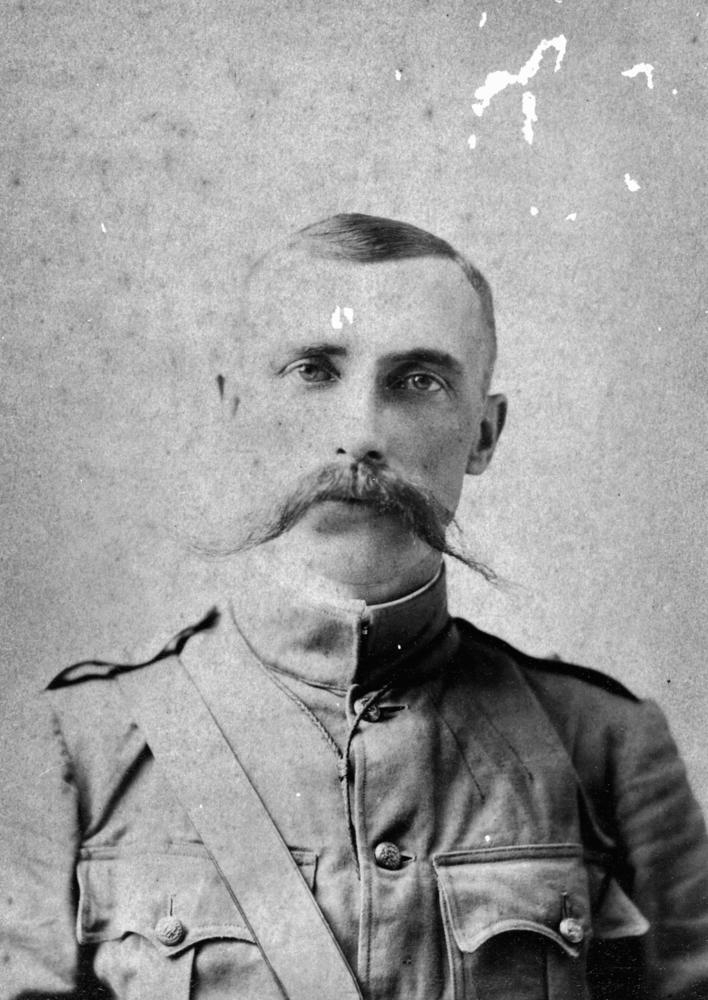
Colin Dunlop Wilson Rankin, chairman of Howard Shire Council 1903

- 1903: Colin Rankin
- 1912: C. Christensen
