= Howard, Queensland =

Howard
- Town
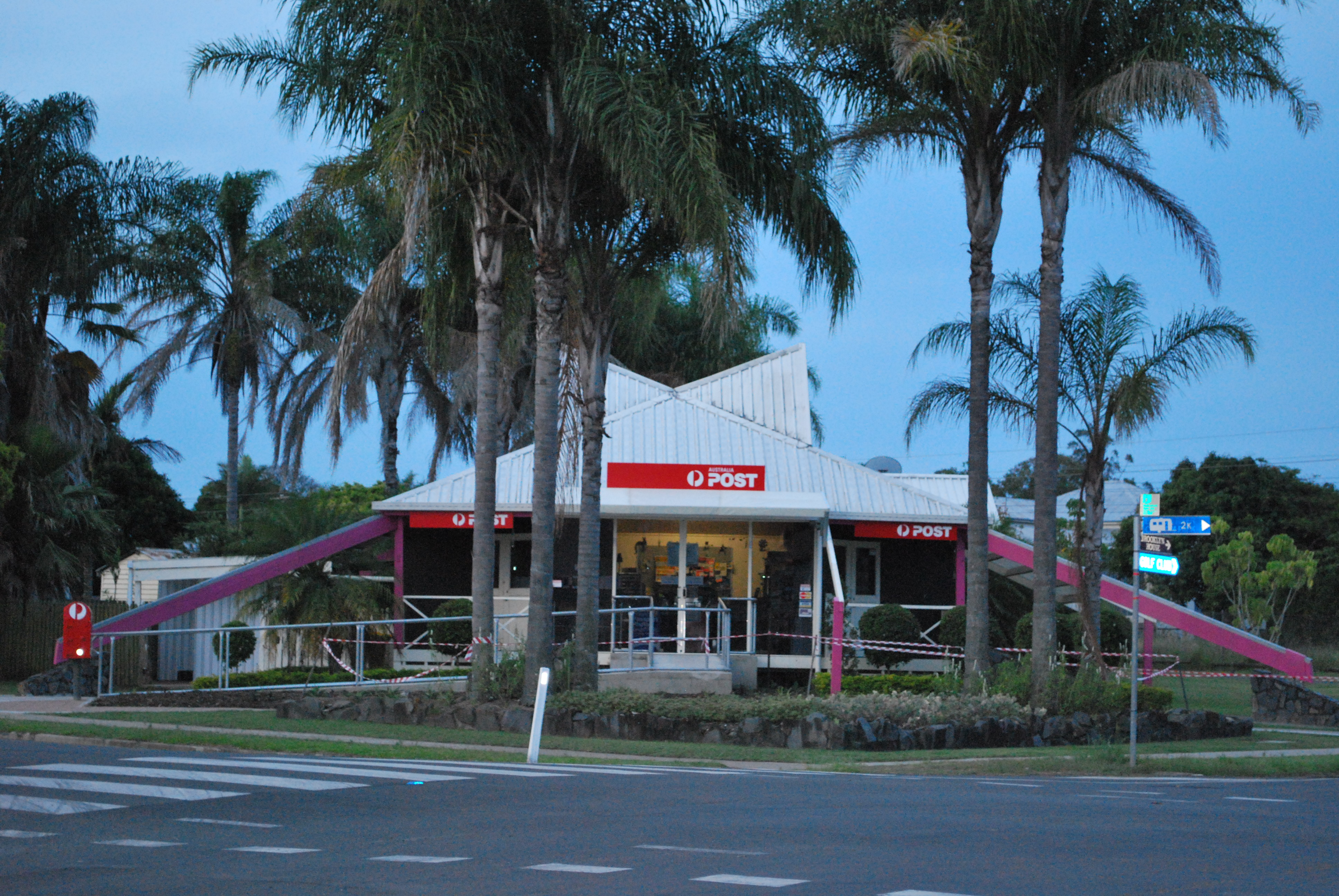
- Post office at Howard in 2008, which in 2021-2024 was a cafe.

- Interactive map of Howard
- Coordinates: 25.3180°S 152.5591°E
- Country: Australia
- State: Queensland
- LGA: Fraser Coast Region
- Location: 25.7 km (16.0 mi) WSW of Hervey Bay; 31.6 km (19.6 mi) ESE of Childers; 280 km (170 mi) N of Brisbane

Government
  - State electorate: Maryborough
  - Federal division: Hinkler

Area
  - Total: 45.9 km^{2} (17.7 sq mi)

Population
  - Total: 1,394 (2021 census)
  - Density: 30.37/km^{2} (78.66/sq mi)
- Time zone: UTC+10:00 (AEST)
- Postcode: 4659
Localities around Howard
Cherwell	Pacific Haven	Burrum River
Cherwell	Howard	Burrum Town
Duckinwilla	Duckinwilla	Torbanlea

Howard is a rural town and locality in the Fraser Coast Region, Queensland, Australia. It is a southern boundary of the Dundaburra peoples of the Northern Kabi Kabi Isis districts and surrounds. It is located 284 kilometres (176 mi) north of Brisbane and 37 kilometres (23 mi) west of Hervey Bay. In the 2021 census, the locality of Howard had a population of 1,394 people.

== Geography ==
Torbanlea is on the east side of the Burrum River and Howard on the west side of the Burrum River. The distance between the towns is 5.1 kilometres (3.2 miles), and they were known as twin towns.

Maria Creek runs through the town and discharges into the Burrum River downstream of the Howard boat ramp.

The Bruce Highway passes through the locality in an east–west direction skirting the edge of the town. Queensland's North Coast railway line passes in a NW-SE direction through the town centre. The main streets of Howard are Steley and William.

== History ==
The town was originally known as Steley (after Abel Steley) but was renamed after William Howard, a pioneer in coal mining in the Burrum area.

Abel Steley commenced coal mining in the area in 1856. After a series of setbacks, he eventually established the successful Beauford Colliery and the Queensland Collieries Company.

In 1877 George Howard and his son William established the Howard Colliery.

From the 1860s the coal from the Burrum coalfields was transported to the port at Maryborough for loading onto boats. From 1877 the 44-ton stern-wheel steamer Barbara and Jane commenced navigating the Burrum River to transport the coal to Maryborough. In 1883 the railway line from Maryborough to the Burrum River opened, and was known as the Burrum line. However until the railway bridge was opened in April 1884, the coal could not be transported by this means. Over the decades, various plans were mooted to move the coal, either through a proposed port at the mouth of the Burrum River, or through the deep water port at Urangan. Burrum coalfields coal supplied the Howard power station which operated from 1951 to 1980.

The Howard Cemetery, known as Howard Remembrance Park, opened in 1876 (25.3053°S 152.5470°E).

The first Burrum Post Office opened on 22 July 1878 and was renamed Howard in 1883.

Burrum Provisional School opened on 18 February 1879. On 3 October 1884, it was renamed Howard State School.

St Matthew's Anglican Church was opened on 3 October 1883 by Bishop Matthew Hale. It was built on 1 acre (0.40 ha) of land donated by the Queensland Land and Coal Company. It was made of hardwood and was 40 by 23 feet (12.2 by 7.0 m) with walls 15 feet (4.6 m) high, capable of holding 200 people. A new church was dedicated on 29 October 1913 by Archbishop St Clair Donaldson and the old church became the church hall. During World War II the hall was used as a field hospital. Its closure circa 2017 was approved by Bishop Jeremy Greaves. The church and hall are at 11 William Street on the south-west corner with Diamantina Drive (25.3136°S 152.5659°E).

On Sunday 30 March 1884 a Primitive Methodist Church was opened in Howard. With the amalgamation of the various Methodist denominations c 1900, it became the Howard Methodist Church and with the amalgamation of the Methodist Church into the Uniting Church in Australia in 1977, it became the Howard Uniting Church.

The 140th anniversary of the Howard Uniting Church and also VanCootens Grocery, Hardware & Stockfeed was celebrated with a Community Day on 7 September 2024.

Howard was the seat of the Howard Division (1900–1903) and its successor Shire of Howard (1903–1917).

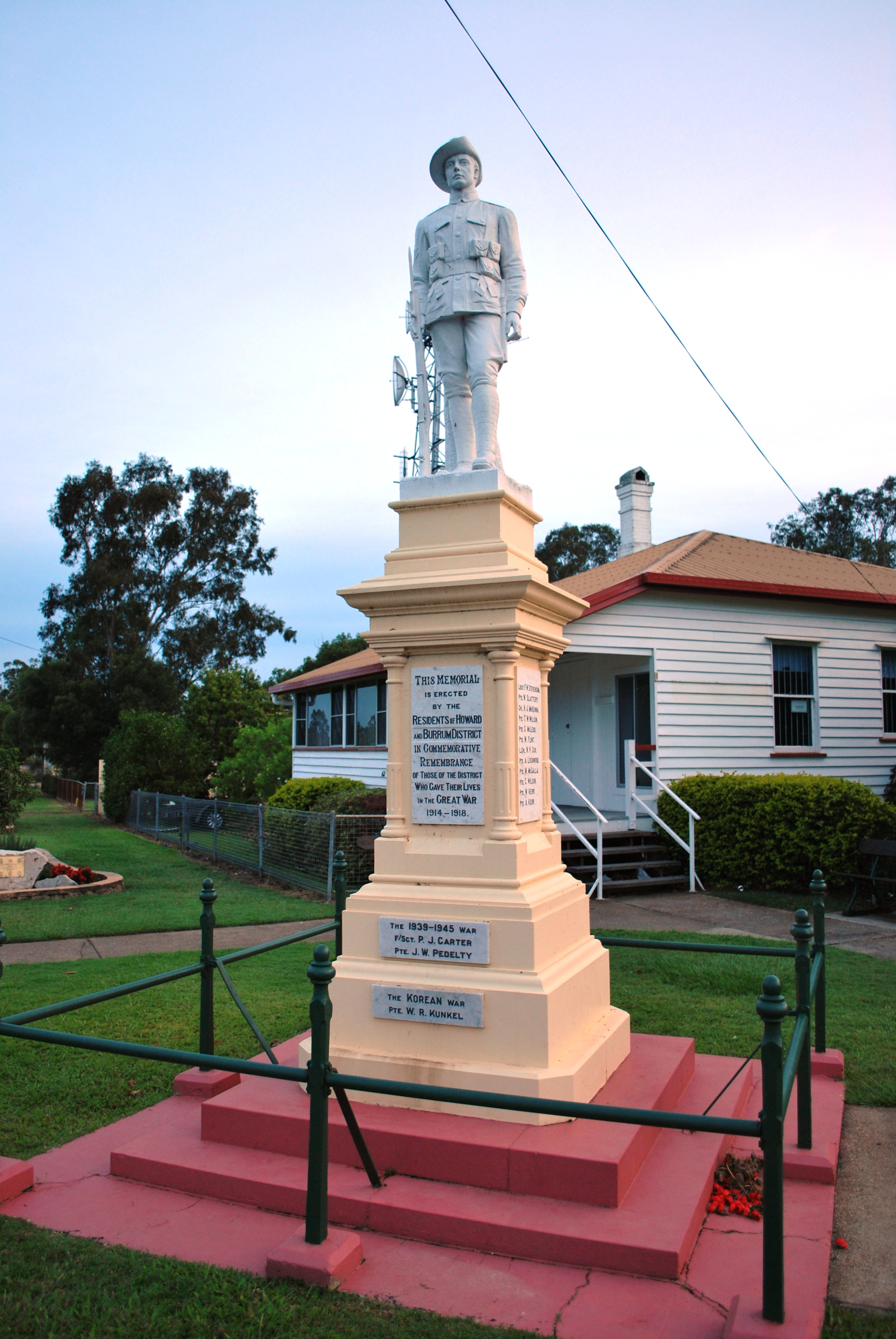
Howard War Memorial

The Howard War Memorial was unveiled by Colin Rankin on 17 December 1921. Unusually for an Australian war memorial, the statue was made in Italy and depicts a soldier in Italian uniform.

In May 1984, the Bruce Highway bypass was opened. Previously the highway had run through the town on Robertson Street. Neighbouring Torbanlea was also bypassed as part of same project.

The Howard Library opened in 2000 and underwent a major refurbishment in 2014.

The historic wooden foot bridge over the railway line in Steley Street near the C.W.A Hall was a popular spot for train spotting. However, it was closed in October 2015 and subsequently demolished, as it became too expensive to maintain.

== Demographics ==
In the 2011 census, the locality of Howard had a population of 1,364 people.

In the 2016 census, the locality of Howard had a population of 1,359 people.

In the 2021 census, the locality of Howard had a population of 1,394 people.

== Heritage listings ==
Howard has a number of heritage-listed sites, including:

- Howard War Memorial, William Street (25.3176°S 152.5624°E)
- Brooklyn House, 23 William Street (25.3140°S 152.5652°E)

== Education ==
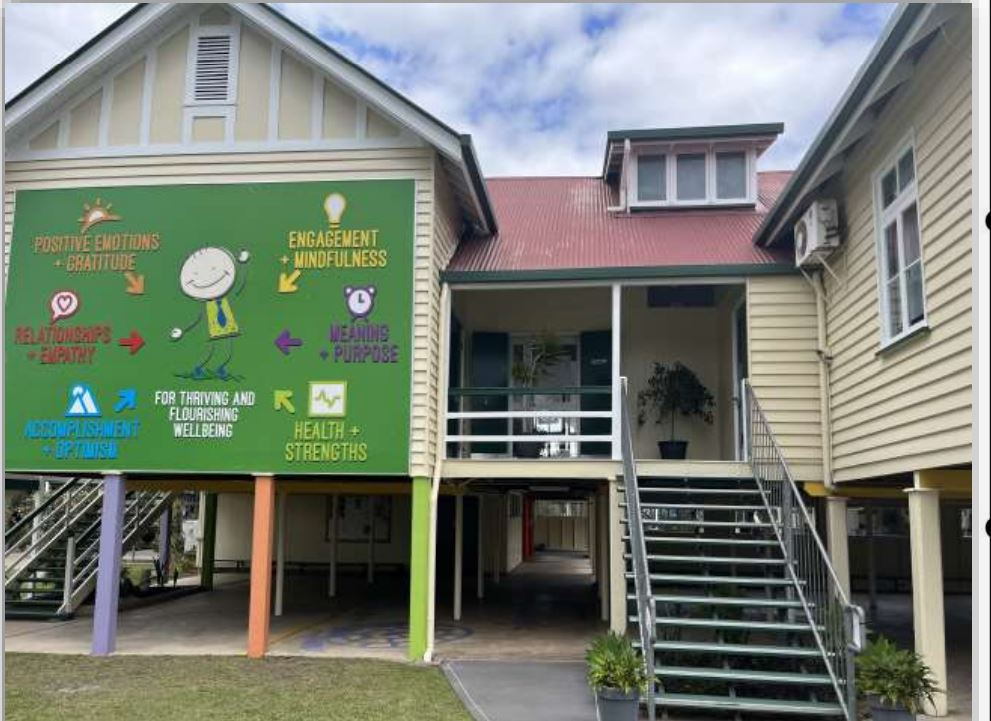
Howard State School, 2025

Howard State School is a government primary (Prep–6) school for boys and girls at 108 William Street (25.3219°S 152.5578°E). In 2012 the school had an enrolment of 177 students with 12 teachers (11.3 full-time equivalent). In 2018, the school had an enrolment of 108 students with 8 teachers (7 full-time equivalent) and 8 non-teaching staff (5 full-time equivalent).

There are no secondary schools in Howard. The nearest government secondary school is Isis District State High School in Childers to the north-west.

== Amenities ==
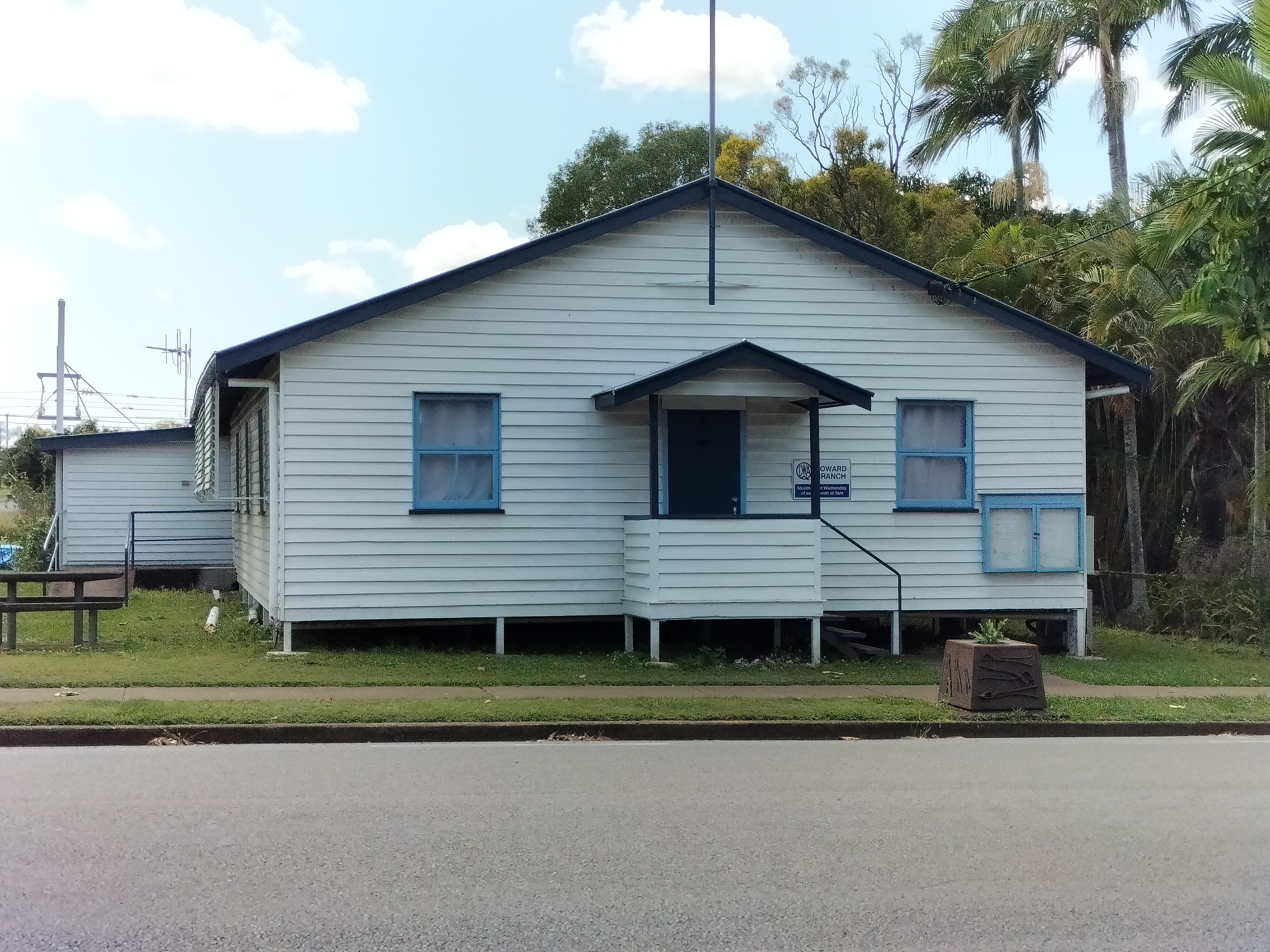
Queensland Country Women's Association Hall, Howard, with a Walk of Achievers steel planter box in front. 2024

The QCWA hall is at 77 Steley Street (25.3167°S 152.5616°E).

A 20-hour stop over for RVs is located in Steley Street opposite the Community Centre and the Howard Sub Branch of the RSL.

Howard railway station (25.3181°S 0152.5639°E) is also on Steley Street, and the Spirit of Queensland and the Tilt train operate from this station if a reservation has been pre-booked.

The Burrum District Community Centre is at 56 Steley Street. The Fraser Coast Regional Council also operates a public library from this location (25.3186°S 152.562558°E).

William Street consists of a licensed post office, milk bar, butcher, bakery, pharmacy, hotel, bottle shop, newsagency, IGA supermarket, veterinary clinic, doctor and several real estate agents. The Howard Police Station is at 98 William Street (25.3210°S 152.5587°E), and Howard Ambulance Station is at 36 Thomas Street (25.3213°S 152.5600°E).

Howard/Torbanlea Uniting Church is in Coal Street (25.3163°S 152.5581°E). It is part of the Mary Burnett Presbytery of the Uniting Church in Australia.

The Burrum District Golf Club is at 14 Gregory Street (25.3114°S 152.5674°E. It has a 9-hole course with alternating tees to create a 18-hole round.

The Howard public boat ramp is managed by Fraser Coast Regional Council and located on the Burrum River at Powerhouse Road (25.3219°S 152.5811°E).

There is a boat ramp into the Burrum River at Powerhouse Drive (25.3224°S 152.5812°E). It is managed by the Fraser Coast Regional Council.

== Facilities ==
The following emergency services are co-located along Thomas Street between William Street and Creek Street, including:

- Howard Police Station, 98 Williams Street (25.3212°S 152.5589°E)
- Howard Ambulance Station, 36 Thomas Street (25.3216°S 152.5601°E)
- a combined complex, including:
  - the Fire and Rescue Service
  - the State Emergency Service
  - the Rural Fire Service

There are a number of other facilities in Howard, including:

- Howard Cemetery, Cemetery Road (25.3043°S 152.5475°E)
- Howard Wastewater Treatment Plant, Steley Street near the railway station (25.3203°S 152.5662°E)

== Attractions ==
A walk around the streets of Howard will reveal information boards about the War Memorial, mining history and the naming of both Bellert Park and the Tom & Minnie Young Memorial Hall.

The Burrum District Museum is open Tuesday and Wednesday 9am – 12 noon, and Saturdays 8am – 12noon.

Brooklyn House is at 23 William Street, Howard and is open Thursday to Sunday, 10am – 3pm.

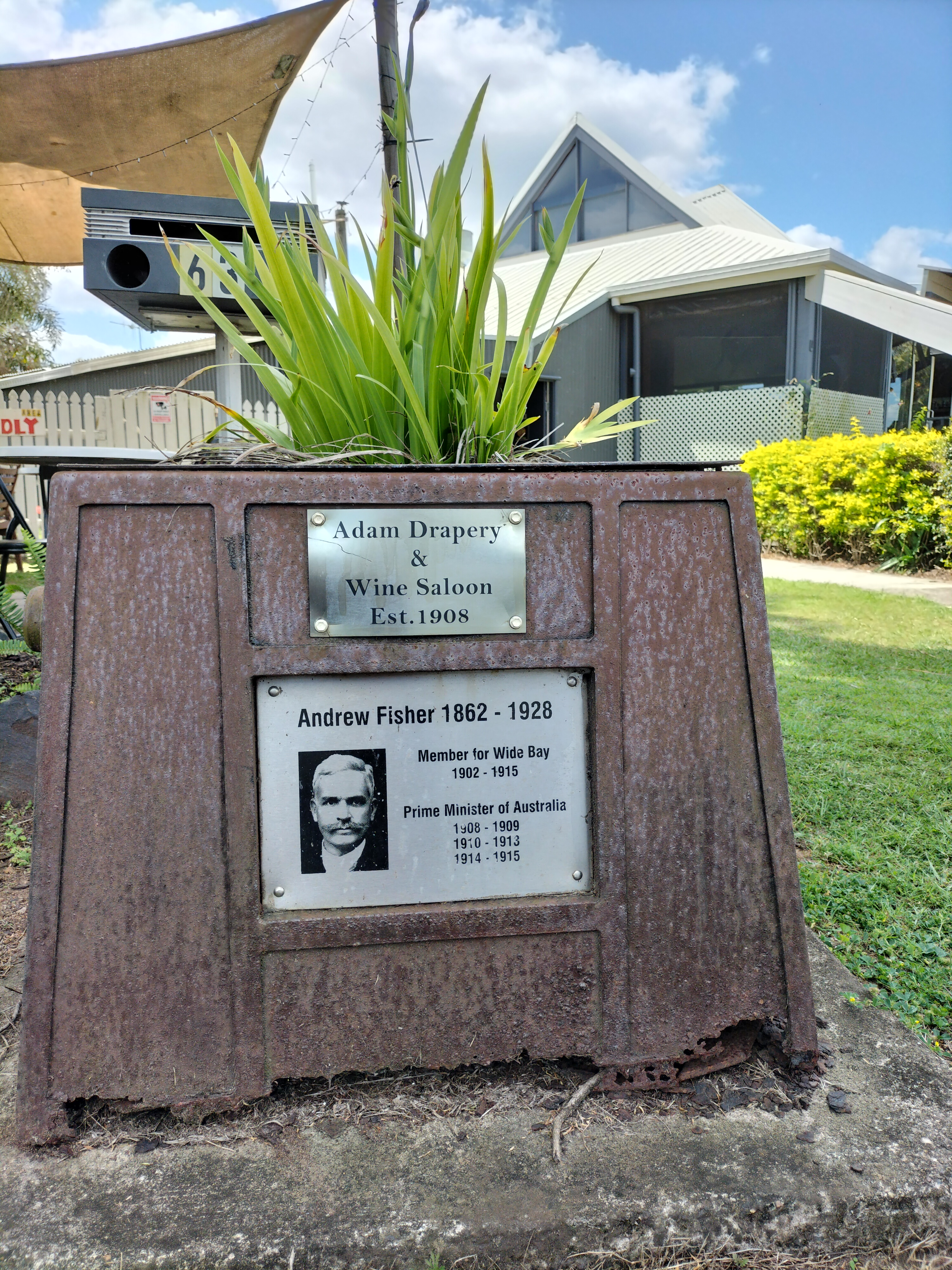
Walk of Achievers steel planter box in the shape of a coal bucket in Howard, Queensland. 2024

The Walk of Achievers honours fourteen former residents.

Burrum Coal Discovery Festival (Coalfest) is held annually in July.

The Howard Country Market is held on the first Saturday of every month except January at the community centre. This market is the largest on the Fraser Coast with well over 100 stalls selling a huge variety of goods.

== Notable residents ==
- Andrew Fisher, first Federal Member for the electorate of Wide Bay and second Labor Prime Minister of Australia. The house he built and lived in still stands.
- Annabelle Rankin, the first woman from Queensland to sit in the Parliament of Australia, the first woman to have a federal portfolio and the first woman to be appointed head of a foreign mission. She lived in Brooklyn House.
- Colin Rankin, chairman of the Shire of Howard, member for Burrum in the Queensland Legislative Assembly. He lived in Brooklyn House.
- Eric Harris (rugby league), Rugby league player who played for Toowoomba, Wests Brisbane, Queensland and Leeds in England.
