= Isis River (Queensland) =

Isis
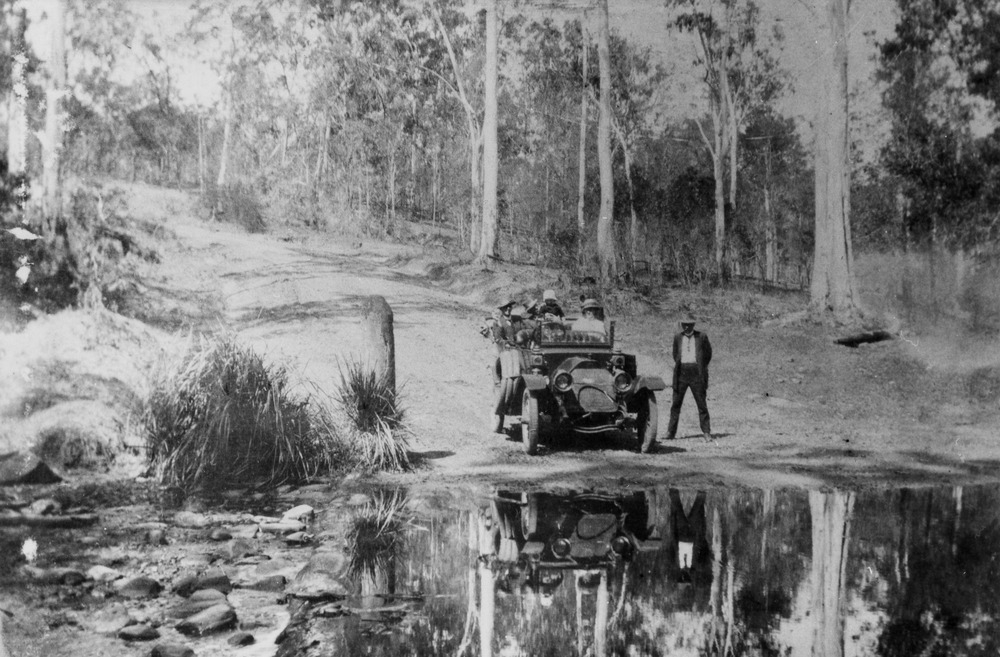
- Automobile at Isis River in 1915

- Location of Isis River river mouth in Queensland
- Etymology: The Isis

Location
- Country: Australia
- State: Queensland
- Region: Wide Bay–Burnett

Physical characteristics
- Source confluence: Smith Creek and Sarahana Creek
  - location: east of Childers
  - coordinates: 25°16′39″S 152°19′59″E
  - elevation: 35 m (115 ft)
- Mouth: confluence with the Burrum River
  - location: south of Buxton
  - coordinates: 25°12′37″S 152°32′17″E
  - elevation: 0 m (0 ft)
- Length: 27 km (17 mi)
- Basin size: 526 km^{2} (203 sq mi)

Basin features
- River system: Burrum River catchment

The Isis River is a river in the Wide Bay–Burnett region of Queensland, Australia.

Formed by the confluence of the Smith and Sarahana Creeks, the river rises east of Childers and flows in an easterly direction where it joins the Burrum River, south of Buxton. Not far from its junction with the Isis River, the Burrum and the Gregory River form a confluence and empty into the Coral Sea at Burrum Heads. The river descends 35 metres (115 ft) over its 27-kilometre (17 mi) course.

The drainage sub-basin occupies an area of 526 square kilometres (203 sq mi).

South of Childers, the river is crossed by the Bruce Highway via the Isis River Bridge.

The river was named by its European discoverers, two colonial surveyors who likened it to the River Isis in Oxfordshire, England. Other features such as the Isis Highway and the Isis Shire draw their name from the river.

== See also ==
- List of rivers of Australia § Queensland
