= Burrum River =

Burrum
- Location of Burrum River mouth in Queensland
- Etymology: Kabi: rocks interrupting river flow

Location
- Country: Australia
- State: Queensland
- Region: Wide Bay-Burnett

Physical characteristics
- Source: Lake Lenthall
  - location: Lake Lenthall
  - elevation: 24 m (79 ft)
- Mouth: Hervey Bay, Coral Sea
  - location: Burrum Heads
  - coordinates: 25°10′46″S 152°37′01″E
  - elevation: 0 m (0 ft)
- Length: 31 km (19 mi)
- Basin size: 2,327.4 km^{2} (898.6 sq mi)
- Discharge
  - location: Near mouth
  - average: 8 m^{3}/s (250 GL/a)

Basin features
- National park: Burrum Coast National Park

The Burrum River is a river in the Wide Bay-Burnett region of Queensland, Australia.

== Course and features ==
The river rises within Lake Lenthall, impounded by Lenthalls Dam at the confluence of several smaller watercourses including Harwood Creek, Woolmer Creek and Duckinwilla Creek, near the town of Burrum. Below Lenthalls Dam the river is impounded by Burrum River Weir No.2 (built in 1951) and Burrum River Weir No.1 (built in 1900). The river flows in northerly direction and is crossed by the Bruce Highway near Howard. The river flows past Pacific Haven before the Isis River joins with the Burrum River at the southern edge of the Burrum Coast National Park. Together with the Gregory River, it discharges into the Burrum Fish Habitat Area in Hervey Bay that flows out to the Coral Sea, at Burrum Heads. The river descends 27 metres (89 ft) over its 31-kilometre (19 mi) course. An estuary is formed at the mouth of the river. The Isis and Gregory Rivers also discharge into the 12 kilometres (7 mi) long and between 2 kilometres (1 mi) and 500 metres (1,640 ft) wide estuary. The area includes intensive inter-tidal flats, shallow sand banks, a meandering main channel with small patched of fringing mangroves.

The catchment area of the river occupies an 3,371 square kilometres (1,302 sq mi) of which an area of 108 square kilometres (42 sq mi) is composed of riverine wetlands. The catchment area is generally low and flat and is situated between the Burnett and Mary River catchments.

The river has a mean annual discharge of 153 gigalitres (200,116,445 cu yd).

== Etymology ==
The river draws its name from the indigenous Australian Kabi language for a word meaning rocks interrupting river flow.

== See also ==
- List of rivers of Australia § Queensland
