= Isis District State High School =

Location
- Childers, Queensland; Australia; 25.2329°S 152.2744°E

Information
- Motto: Know thyself
- Established: 1961
- School district: Bundaberg
- Website: isisdistrictshs.eq.edu.au

Isis District State High School is a public, co-educational, high school, located in the town of Childers, in Queensland, Australia. It is administered by the Department of Education, with an enrolment of 417 students and a teaching staff of 42, as of 2023. The school serves students from Year 7 to Year 12, and is the only high school in the town of Childers.

== History ==
Prior to the schools opening, in 1960, the name for the school was planned to be Childers State High School, however, by the end of 1961 the current name was decided.

The school opened on the 23 January 1961.
