= Hotel Childers =

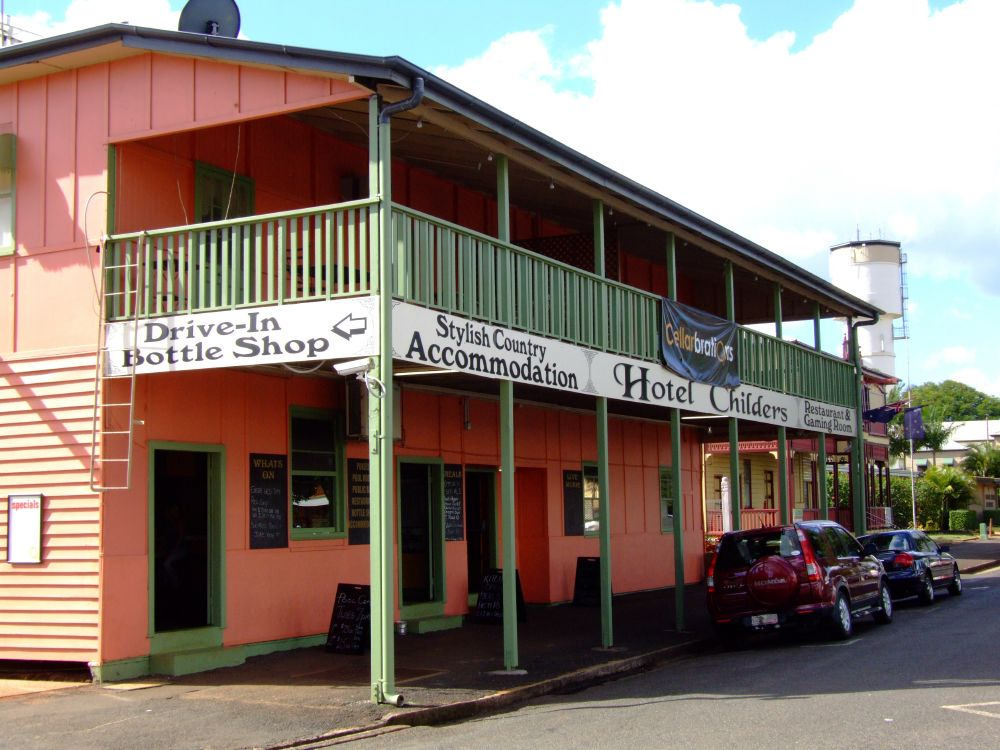
- Hotel Childers, 2008

- Location within Queensland Location within Australia
- 25.2359°S 152.279°E
- Location: 59 Churchill Street, Childers, Bundaberg Region, Queensland, Australia

History
- Design period: 1870s–1890s (late 19th century)
- Built: c. 1895–1930s

Queensland Heritage Register
- Official name: Hotel Childers, Queen's Hotel
- Type: state heritage (built)
- Designated: 21 October 1992
- Reference no.: 600614
- Significant period: 1890s, 1900s, 1930s (fabric) c. 1895–ongoing (historical use)

Hotel Childers is a heritage-listed hotel at 59 Churchill Street, Childers, Bundaberg Region, Queensland, Australia. It was built from c. 1895 to 1930s. It is also known as Queen's Hotel. It was added to the Queensland Heritage Register on 21 October 1992.

== History ==
The Hotel Childers was built in at least two stages in the late 19th and 20th centuries and is one of several hotels built to serve the prosperous and growing centre of Childers.

Following logging of the dense Isis Scrub in the 1870s, Childers, in the heart of the scrub, was promoted in the 1880s by Maryborough interests, as an agricultural district. The land in the immediate vicinity of the present town of Childers was surveyed in 1882 into 50-acre farm blocks. There was no official town survey; Childers developed following the private subdivision of portions 870 and 871, at the railhead of the 1887 Isis railway line from Isis Junction railway station. This was opened in 1887, and was intended principally to facilitate the transport of timber from the scrub.

The coming of the railway not only promoted the development of the town of Childers; it also proved the catalyst for the establishment of a sugar industry in the district in the late 1880s. At the opening of the railway, Robert Cran, owner of Maryborough's Yengarie mill, announced that he would erect a double crushing juice mill at Doolbi, to supply his mill at Yengarie. This was completed in 1890 and further expansion of the sugar industry in the Isis was closely related to the activities of the Colonial Sugar Refining Company, which erected a central crushing mill in the district 1893–94. By 1895, at least three other mills had been established in the Isis, with another two under construction, and Childers had emerged as the flourishing centre of a substantial sugar-growing district: in the years between 1891 and 1900 the population grew from 91 to 4000.

The growth of the Isis district in the 1890s is reflected in the series of hotels constructed in Childers to accommodate travellers, businessmen and the many seasonal workers in the sugar industry. In 1894 Elijah Kirby purchased land on the northern side of the main street and applied for a hotel license. In 1895 he took out a mortgage for £600, which is probably associated with the building of his hotel. This was a single storey timber building with a verandah along the front and side and was called the Queen's Hotel. Childers was then served by five hotels; the Childers Hotel, moved from Horton in 1887 and on the site of Grand Hotel, the Isis (1892), BelleVue (1895) and Royal (1895). The Palace Hotel was built in 1897 and in 1899 the two storey brick Grand Hotel was constructed. It was the only building to survive a disastrous 1902 fire that destroyed most of the buildings on that side of the main street. In 1902–3 the town centre was rebuilt with fashionable new brick buildings more in keeping with Childers' success. In 1903 the old Isis Divisional Board was abolished and Isis Shire proclaimed, with the new seat of municipal government moving from Howard to Childers. In 1907, the last of Childers Hotels, the Federal, was constructed.

In 1898 the Queen's Hotel was leased to James Thompson for five years. He was to be the first of a large number of licensees, some of whom only ran the hotel for short periods. The hotel also changed hands a number of times, only some of the owners actually running the hotel. By the first decade of the 20th century Childers' other hotels were all two storied and it is thought that the ground floor of the Queen's Hotel was incorporated into a major rebuilding which added a storey to the building. The date at which this occurred is unknown, though changes may have occurred in 1909 when Hilmar Andresen purchased the hotel and borrowed £2000 to do so. However, the hotel had least a major refurbishment in the 1930s, as much of the joinery and detailing in the interior of the hotel is consistent with that date. In 1939, the name of the hotel was changed to the Hotel Childers, possibly to mark this change.

The upper verandah was built in with fibrous cement sheeting for many years, but was reconstructed according to its original appearance in mid 2000. Refurbishment in recent years has also made some changes to the ground floor, including the installation of a gaming room. Much of the original detail remains, however.

== Description ==
The Hotel Childers is a two-storey building with an upper level balcony overhanging the street, between the National Australia Bank (the former Queensland National Bank) and the Childers RSL Club (former Commercial Banking Company of Sydney building), on the northern side of Childers main street, Churchill Street.

The ground floor is constructed of timber boards and contains a bar, billiard room, lounge, gaming room and kitchens. Interwar detailing includes a timber staircase, which has been painted, plate rails, moulded ceilings and timber and glass doors and door furniture.

The upper level is clad with fibrous plaster sheeting and has deep balconies at the front and rear. That at the front has timber balustrading and that at the rear has been built in with fibrous plaster sheeting and glass louvres. This floor contains a large central hall with corridors running off it to each side from which the publican's flat and guest bedrooms are accessed. The hall and four of the guest bedrooms open onto the front balcony. There bathrooms on the rear verandah. The walls are of vertical boards and the rooms are ceiled with fibrous sheeting and battens.

Roofs are clad with modern metal sheeting and there is a beergarden and entertainment area to the rear of the hotel.

== Heritage listing ==
Hotel Childers was listed on the Queensland Heritage Register on 21 October 1992 having satisfied the following criteria.

The place is important in demonstrating the evolution or pattern of Queensland's history.

The Hotel Childers is one of a group of hotels that demonstrate the rapid growth of Childers in the late 19th and early 20th century. As a provider of food, accommodation and entertainment, the number and size of hotels in a town were used as an indicator of the prosperity of a district. The hotel illustrates the unprecedented growth then occurring in the Isis, when Childers was emerging as the flourishing centre of a substantial sugar-growing district.

The place is important because of its aesthetic significance.

The Hotel Childers is hotel is a landmark in the main street that contributes to the architecturally coherent and picturesque townscape of Childers.

The place has a strong or special association with a particular community or cultural group for social, cultural or spiritual reasons.

The Hotel Childers is associated with the community of Childers as a public building that has formed part of the recreational life of the town for most of the 20th century.
