= Hardware Store, Childers =

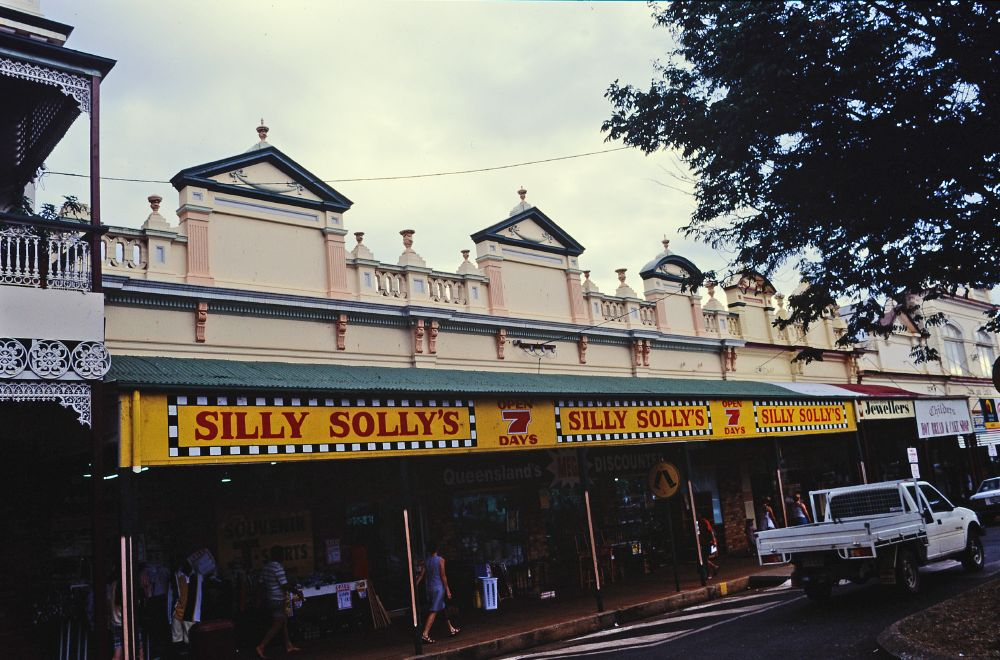
- Former Hardware Store, 2000

- Location within Queensland Location within Australia
- 25.2368°S 152.2784°E
- Location: 74–78 Churchill Street, Childers, Bundaberg Region, Queensland, Australia

History
- Design period: 1900–1914 (early 20th century)
- Built: 1902

Site notes
- Architect: F H Faircloth
- Architectural style: Classicism

Queensland Heritage Register
- Official name: Hardware Store (former), Mitre 10, Silly Solly's, Pettigrew's Hardware, Wyper Brothers Ironmongery
- Type: state heritage (built)
- Designated: 21 October 1992
- Reference no.: 600624
- Significant period: 1900s (fabric); 1902–ongoing (historical use as shops)

The Hardware Store is a heritage-listed row of shops at 74–78 Churchill Street, Childers, Bundaberg Region, Queensland, Australia. It was designed by F H Faircloth and built in 1902. It is also known as Mitre 10, Silly Solly's, Pettigrew's Hardware, and Wyper Brothers Ironmongery. It was added to the Queensland Heritage Register on 21 October 1992.

== History ==
The former hardware store is one of a row of conjoining shops situated between the Palace Hotel and Kerr's Buildings. It was erected in 1902 to the design of Bundaberg architect FH Faircloth, following a fire that destroyed most of the south side of Churchill Street, the main street of Childers. Faircloth was responsible for much of the new building following the fire, the effects of which transformed the appearance of Childers.

Childers is located in what was once the heart of the Isis Scrub. Following logging of the dense scrub in the 1870s, Childers was promoted in the 1880s by Maryborough interests as an agricultural district. The land in the immediate vicinity of the present town of Childers was surveyed in 1882 into 50-acre farm blocks. There was no official town survey; Childers developed following private subdivision at the railhead of the 1887 Isis railway line from Isis Junction. This was opened on 31 October 1887, and was intended principally to facilitate the transport of timber from the scrub.

The coming of the railway not only promoted the development of the town of Childers; it also proved the catalyst for the establishment of a sugar industry in the district in the late 1880s. At the opening of the railway to Childers, Robert Cran, owner of Maryborough's Yengarie mill, announced that he would erect a double crushing juice mill at Doolbi, to supply his mill at Yengarie. This was completed in 1890, with the juice being brought in railway tankers from the Isis. Further expansion of the sugar industry in the Isis was closely related to the activities of the Colonial Sugar Refining Company, which erected a central crushing mill in the district 1893–94, and began crushing in 1895. By 1895, at least three other mills had been established in the Isis, with another two under construction, and Childers had emerged as the flourishing centre of a substantial sugar-growing district.

1902 was a very dry year and Childers had no fire brigade. On 23 March, a catastrophic fire swept through the south side of the main street in town, where virtually all the buildings were timber and closely built. Those stores destroyed were: S Oakley, bootmaker; FD Cooper, commission agent; R Graham, fruiterer; ME Gosley, tailor; Foley, hairdresser; M Redmond, Palace Hotel; WB Jones, auctioneer; W Couzens, fruiterer; H Newman, general storekeeper; WJ Overell and Son, general merchants; P Christensen, cabinet maker; W Hood, stationer; T Gaydon, chemist; W Lloyd, hairdresser; Mrs Dunne, fruiterer; Federal Jewellery Company; Dunn Bros, saddlers; H Wegner, bootmaker. The Bundaberg architect F H Faircloth was engaged to redesign most of the replacement buildings and called the first tenders in June 1902.

Frederic Herbert (Herb) Faircloth was born in Maryborough in 1870 and was a pupil of German-trained Bundaberg architect Anton Hettrich. Faircloth set up his own practice in Bundaberg in 1893 and was very successful, eventually being responsible for the design of almost every important building in Bundaberg. He was also to have a major effect on the appearance and character of Childers.

Before the fire, photographs show a timber building on this site, however it has not been possible to establish what business was run from the premises. Thomas Gaydon may have operated his first pharmacy from this site in the 1890s although his premises after the fire were located a few doors away at 90 Churchill Street on land also owned by him. The family continued to own the land until 1973 when it was sold to John and Elaine Hughes and then to Ross and Wendy Smith in 1989.

Like other post-fire buildings in Childers this set of 5 shops were masonry rather than timber, a choice no doubt influenced by the fire, and were elegant single story buildings with large glass shop fronts. Striped ogee awnings across the footpath were supported by decorative posts with cast iron infill. Each shop had a separate roof, some lit by lanterns and the individual tenancies were also marked by the visual separation of the facades by the use of classic revival pediments, urns, and balustrades. Although this row of shops was designed as five tenancies, two were owned by Albert Gorrie, who conducted a bakery in one and leased the other, and three by Thomas Gaydon, which were occupied as a single tenancy by Wyper Brothers, ironmongers, who also sold furniture and hardware. Pettigrew's Hardware who succeeded them in the 1920s, also used all of the Gaydon owned space, which practice seems to have continued. Although the building has now changed hands several times it has been a hardware store for most of its commercial life. It became Silly Solly's in early 1996.

== Description ==
The former hardware store extends through three bays of a set of 5 single story masonry shops built conjointly on the south side of Churchill Street adjoining the Palace Hotel. It has a corrugated iron roof concealed by a parapet. In common with a number of shops on this side of the street, this building has classical revival pediments, some curved and some triangular, linked by a balustraded parapet topped by urns. The shop front has been modernised and is shaded by an ogee profile corrugated iron awning supported by posts to the street, although the cast iron valance is no longer present. The interior has been refitted with succeeding tenancies.

== Heritage listing ==
The former Hardware Store was listed on the Queensland Heritage Register on 21 October 1992 having satisfied the following criteria.

The place is important in demonstrating the evolution or pattern of Queensland's history.

It is important in demonstrating the evolution of Queensland's history representing evidence of the development of Childers in the early twentieth century in particular, the rebuilding of the south side of the main street in the early 1900s following the 1902 fire. Together with much of the southern side of Childers main street it provides clear evidence of the impact of fire on Queensland towns where adequate water supply and fire services were lacking.

The place is important in demonstrating the principal characteristics of a particular class of cultural places.

It is important in demonstrating the principal characteristics of early 1900s country town masonry commercial buildings, in particular the awnings, shop fronts, lanterns, and overall form.

The place is important because of its aesthetic significance.

It contributes to the picturesque townscape of Churchill Street which is both remarkably architecturally coherent and intact

The place has a special association with the life or work of a particular person, group or organisation of importance in Queensland's history.

It has a special association with the life and work of Bundaberg architect FH Faircloth who was responsible for much of the appearance of the town of Childers in the twentieth century.
