= Jeffery's Building =

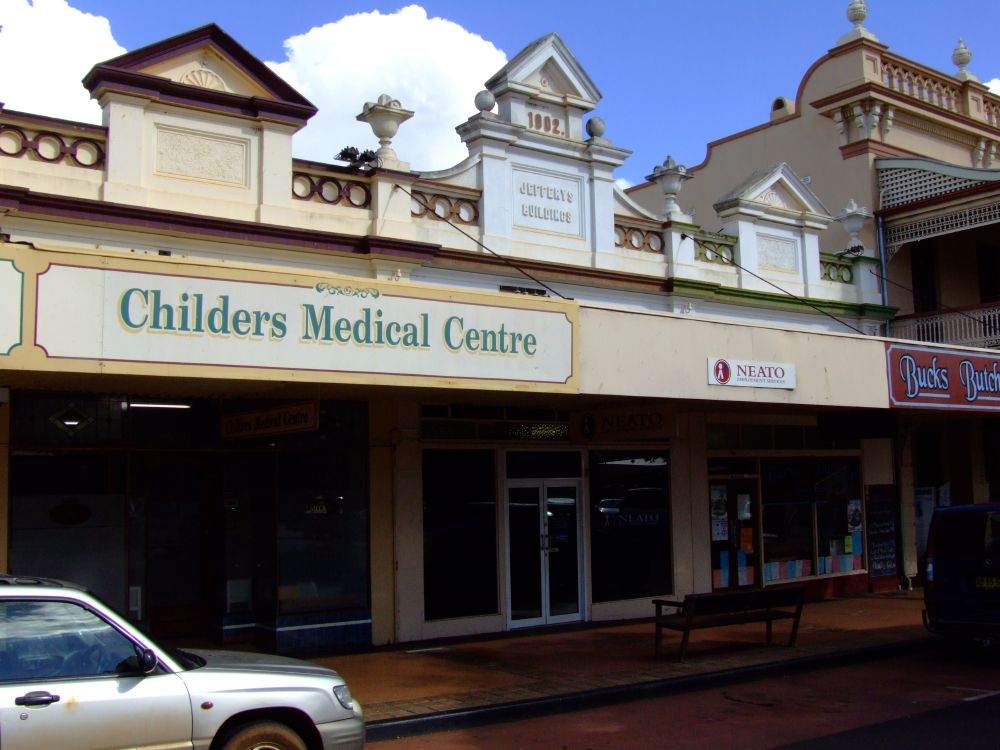
- Jeffery's Building, 2008

- Location within Queensland Location within Australia
- 25.2368°S 152.2788°E
- Location: 66–70 Churchill Street, Childers, Bundaberg Region, Queensland, Australia

History
- Design period: 1900–1914 (early 20th century)
- Built: 1902

Site notes
- Architect: F H Faircloth
- Architectural style: Classicism

Queensland Heritage Register
- Official name: Jeffery's Building, Childers Medical Centre, Foodland, R & D Meats and DJG Fruit & Vegetable shop
- Type: state heritage (built)
- Designated: 21 October 1992
- Reference no.: 600609
- Significant period: 1900s (fabric); 1902–ongoing (historical use)

Jeffery's Building is a heritage-listed retail shop at 66–70 Churchill Street, Childers, Bundaberg Region, Queensland, Australia. It was designed by F H Faircloth and built in 1902. It is also known as Childers Medical Centre, Foodland, and R & D Meats and DJG Fruit & Vegetable shop. It was added to the Queensland Heritage Register on 21 October 1992.

== History ==
The Jeffery's Building was erected in 1902 for Childers businessman Alfred Charles Jeffery following the fire that destroyed most of the south side of Churchill Street, the main street of Childers. It may have been designed by Bundaberg architect, FW Faircloth who was responsible for much of the new building following the fire the effects of which transformed Childers main street from a pioneer frontier township of timber and iron structures to the established centre of the flourishing Isis district with its new more substantial masonry buildings.

Childers is located in what was once the heart of the Isis Scrub. Following logging of the dense scrub in the 1870s, Childers was promoted in the 1880s by Maryborough interests as an agricultural district. The land in the immediate vicinity of the present town of Childers was surveyed in 1882 into 50-acre (20 ha) farm blocks. There was no official town survey; Childers developed following private subdivision at the railhead of the 1887 Isis railway line from Isis Junction. This was opened on 31 October 1887, and was intended principally to facilitate the transport of timber from the scrub.

The coming of the railway not only promoted the development of the town of Childers; it also proved the catalyst for the establishment of a sugar industry in the district in the late 1880s. At the opening of the railway to Childers, Robert Cran, owner of Maryborough's Yengarie mill, announced that he would erect a double crushing juice mill at Doolbi, to supply his mill at Yengarie. This was completed in 1890, with the juice being brought in railway tankers from the Isis. Further expansion of the sugar industry in the Isis was closely related to the activities of the Colonial Sugar Refining Company, which erected a central crushing mill in the district 1893–94, and began crushing in 1895. By 1895, at least three other mills had been established in the Isis, with another two under construction, and Childers had emerged as the flourishing centre of a substantial sugar-growing district.

1902 was a very dry year and Childers had no fire brigade. On 23 March, a catastrophic fire swept through the south side of the main street in town, where virtually all the buildings were timber and closely built. Those stores destroyed were: S Oakley, bootmaker; FD Cooper, commission agent; R Graham, fruiterer; ME Gosley, tailor; Foley, hairdresser; M Redmond, Palace Hotel; WB Jones, auctioneer; W Couzens, fruiterer; H Newman, general storekeeper; WJ Overell and Son, general merchants; P Christensen, cabinet maker; W Hood, stationer; T Gaydon, chemist; W Lloyd, hairdresser; Mrs Dunne, fruiterer; Federal Jewellery Company; Dunn Bros, saddlers; H Wegner, bootmaker. The Bundaberg architect F H Faircloth was engaged to redesign many of the replacement buildings and called the first tenders in June 1902.

Frederic Herbert (Herb) Faircloth was born in Maryborough in 1870 and was a pupil of German-trained Bundaberg architect Anton Hettrich. Faircloth set up his own practice in Bundaberg in 1893 and was very successful, eventually being responsible for the design of almost every major building in Bundaberg. He was also to have a major effect on the appearance and character of Childers.

The land (resub 7) containing 1 rood 6.87 perches (1,185 m^{2}) was acquired by Amy Jane Thomason in 1894 after its subdivision by Charles Powers and Frederick John Charlton. She then sold it to Alfred Jeffery in 1898. Timber shops can be seen on this site in photographs taken before the fire, although it has not been possible to verify what businesses occupied them. After the fire there was some adjustment of boundaries to properties along the burned section and new Certificates of Title were issued.

The new buildings were masonry rather than timber, a choice no doubt influenced by the fire. The shops were elegant single story buildings with large display windows and awnings across the footpath supported by decorative posts. The use of classical revival pediments, urns, and balustrades on all the shops created a pleasing rhythm along the street while allowing individuality to each premises. Tenancies were also marked by the visual separation of the facades by the use of separate pediments. Jeffery's Building shares these features with the hotel and slightly later shop which flank it.

This building appears to have been meant as three different tenancies, however, the way in which the building has been occupied has not always conformed to this. In 1904 two tenancies were occupied by a wine merchant and in 1908, the building was shared by Garland's furniture warehouse and a cafe run by Stephen Crowe which continued to operate from here for many years. The property was purchased in 1909 by Mary Gaydon, though continuing to be leased out. In 1937 it was subdivided into two blocks and Stephen and Theodore Crowe purchased sub 1, which no doubt contained their cafe. However, in 1945 this was reacquired by the Gaydons who held the property until 1963, when it was sold to Jack Kasses. After a resurvey in 1975, the block was divided into 4 blocks, three to the street and a small block as the rear of the property. They were then sold to different owners. At this time, Boys Ltd, who were then operating in the large shop adjoining, purchased lot 3 and extended into one bay of Jeffery's Building. This section is now separate again and is a medical practice. The fruit shop and butchers which occupy the other two shops in Jeffery's Building are long term tenancies.

== Description ==
Jeffrey's Building is a single story row of masonry shops on the south side of Churchill Street, Childers main street adjoining the Palace Hotel. In common with other shops on this side of the street, it has a corrugated iron roof concealed by a parapet which is topped by a classical revival pediments and urns, each tenancy being marked by a separate triangular pediment. The central pediment is raised and carried the words 'Jeffery's Building' and the date '1902'in raised letters.

The awning across the footpath is now cantilevered and the building has modern shop fronts. The section of the building occupied as a medical practice has had the shop front reconstructed to resemble its original form.

== Heritage listing ==
Jeffery's Building was listed on the Queensland Heritage Register on 21 October 1992 having satisfied the following criteria.

The place is important in demonstrating the evolution or pattern of Queensland's history.

It is important in demonstrating the evolution of Queensland's history representing evidence of the development of Childers in the early twentieth century in particular, the rebuilding of the south side of the main street in the early 1900s following the 1902 fire. Together with much of the southern side of Childers main street it provides clear evidence of the impact of fire on Queensland towns where adequate water supply and fire services were lacking.

The place is important in demonstrating the principal characteristics of a particular class of cultural places.

It is important in demonstrating the principal characteristics of early 1900s country town masonry commercial buildings, in particular the awnings, shop fronts, lanterns, and overall form.

The place is important because of its aesthetic significance.

It contributes to the picturesque townscape of Churchill Street which is both remarkably architecturally coherent and intact

The place has a special association with the life or work of a particular person, group or organisation of importance in Queensland's history.

It has a special association with the life and work of Bundaberg architect FW Faircloth who was responsible for much of the appearance of the town of Childers in the twentieth century.
