= Childers Bakery =

Bakeries of Australia

Bakery
- Location within Queensland Location within Australia
- 25.237°S 152.2782°E
- Location: 82 Churchill Street, Childers, Bundaberg Region, Queensland, Australia

History
- Design period: 1900–1914 (early 20th century)
- Built: 1902

Site notes
- Architect: F H Faircloth
- Architectural style: Classicism

Queensland Heritage Register
- Official name: Bakery, A.E. Gorrie, Baker and Confectioner, Isis Bakery, Childers Hot Bread and Cake Shop, Sutton's Bakery
- Type: state heritage (built)
- Designated: 21 October 1992
- Reference no.: 600626
- Significant period: 1900s (fabric); 1902–ongoing (historical use as bakery)

The Childers Bakery is a heritage-listed bakery at 82 Churchill Street, Childers, Bundaberg Region, Queensland, Australia. It was designed by F H Faircloth and built in 1902. It is also known as A.E. Gorrie, Baker and Confectioner, Isis Bakery, Childers Hot Bread and Cake Shop, and Sutton's Bakery. It was added to the Queensland Heritage Register on 21 October 1992.

== History ==
The Childers Bakery is one of a row of conjoining shops situated between the Palace Hotel and Kerr's Buildings. It and the adjoining newsagency were built in 1902 for Alfred Gorrie to the design of Bundaberg architect FH Faircloth, following a fire that destroyed most of the south side of the main street of Childers. Faircloth was responsible for much of the new building following the fire, the effects of which transformed the appearance of Childers.

Childers is located in what was once the heart of the Isis Scrub. Following logging of the dense Scrub in the 1870s, Childers was promoted in the 1880s by Maryborough interests as an agricultural district. The land in the immediate vicinity of the present town of Childers was surveyed in 1882 into 50-acre (20 ha) farm blocks. There was no official town survey; Childers developed following private subdivision at the railhead of the 1887 extension line from Isis Junction. This was opened on 31 October 1887, and was intended principally to facilitate the transport of timber from the scrub.

The coming of the railway not only promoted the development of the town of Childers; it also proved the catalyst for the establishment of a sugar industry in the district in the late 1880s. At the opening of the railway to Childers, Robert Cran, owner of Maryborough's Yengarie mill, announced that he would erect a double crushing juice mill at Doolbi, to supply his mill at Yengarie. This was completed in 1890, with the juice being brought in railway tankers from the Isis. Further expansion of the sugar industry in the Isis was closely related to the activities of the Colonial Sugar Refining Company, which erected a central crushing mill in the district 1893–94, and began crushing in 1895. By 1895, at least three other mills had been established in the Isis, with another two under construction, and Childers had emerged as the flourishing centre of a substantial sugar-growing district.

1902 was a very dry year and Childers had no fire brigade. On 23 March, a catastrophic fire swept through the south side of the main street in town, where virtually all the buildings were timber and closely built. Those stores destroyed were: S Oakley, bootmaker; FD Cooper, commission agent; R Graham, fruiterer; ME Gosley, tailor; Foley, hairdresser; M Redmond, Palace Hotel; WB Jones, auctioneer; W Couzens, fruiterer; H Newman, general storekeeper; WJ Overell and Son, general merchants; P Christensen, cabinet maker; W Hood, stationer; T Gaydon, chemist; W Lloyd, hairdresser; Mrs Dunne, fruiterer; Federal Jewellery Company; Dunn Bros, saddlers; H Wegner, bootmaker. The Bundaberg architect F H Faircloth was engaged to redesign many of the replacement buildings and called the first tenders in June 1902.

Frederic Herbert (Herb) Faircloth was born in Maryborough in 1870 and was a pupil of German-trained Bundaberg architect Anton Hettrich. Faircloth set up his own practice in Bundaberg in 1893 and was very successful, eventually being responsible for the design of almost every major building in Bundaberg. He was also to have a major effect on the appearance and character of Childers.

Prior to the fire, photographs show a timber building on this site, which may have been Overell's Drapery. Following the fire, this land was purchased by Alfred Gorrie. A row of 5 shops were built, two of which were owned by Gorrie and the remaining three were owned by chemist Thomas Gaydon and occupied as a single tenancy by a hardware store. Like other post fire buildings in Childers this set of shops were masonry rather than timber, a choice no doubt influenced by the fire, and were elegant single story buildings with large glass shop fronts. Striped ogee awnings across the footpath were supported by decorative posts with cast iron infill. Each shop had a separate roof, some lit by lanterns and the individual tenancies were also marked by the visual separation of the facades by the use of classic revival pediments, urns, and balustrades.

Gorrie rented out one of his shops to hairdresser and barber William Lloyd, whose premises had been destroyed in the fire. This shop he occupied himself as A.E. Gorrie, baker and confectioner. In 1930 the shop was leased to Beatrice Sutton who was also a baker and the business was later run as Sutton Brothers, bakers. In 1941 Gorrie died and the property passed to Edward Gorrie who sold it to William and Annie McKay in 1958. It was purchased in 1976 by Earle and June Robinson who subdivided the property so that each shop was on a separate title. The shop has changed hands several times before passing to the current owners, but appears to have always been a bakery. It is now Childers Hot Bread and Cake Shop.

== Description ==
The bakery is one shop within a row of single story masonry shops built conjointly on the south side of Churchill Street, adjoining the Palace Hotel. It has a corrugated iron roof concealed by a parapet. In common with a number of shops on this side of the street, this building has classical revival pediments, some curved and some triangular, linked by a balustraded parapet topped by urns. The shop front is shaded by an ogee profile corrugated iron awning supported by posts to the street, although the cast iron valance is no longer present.

== Heritage listing ==
The Childers Bakery was listed on the Queensland Heritage Register on 21 October 1992 having satisfied the following criteria.

The place is important in demonstrating the evolution or pattern of Queensland's history.

It is important in demonstrating the evolution of Queensland's history representing evidence of the development of Childers in the early twentieth century in particular, the rebuilding of the south side of the main street in the early 1900s following the 1902 fire. Together with much of the southern side of Childers main street it provides clear evidence of the impact of fire on Queensland towns where adequate water supply and fire services were lacking.

The place is important in demonstrating the principal characteristics of a particular class of cultural places.

It is important in demonstrating the principal characteristics of early 1900s country town masonry commercial buildings, in particular the awnings, shop fronts, lanterns, and overall form.

The place is important because of its aesthetic significance.

It contributes to the picturesque townscape of Churchill Street which is both remarkably architecturally coherent and intact.

The place has a special association with the life or work of a particular person, group or organisation of importance in Queensland's history.

It has a special association with the life and work of Bundaberg architect FH Faircloth who was responsible for much of the appearance of the town of Childers in the twentieth century.
