= Isis Masonic Lodge =

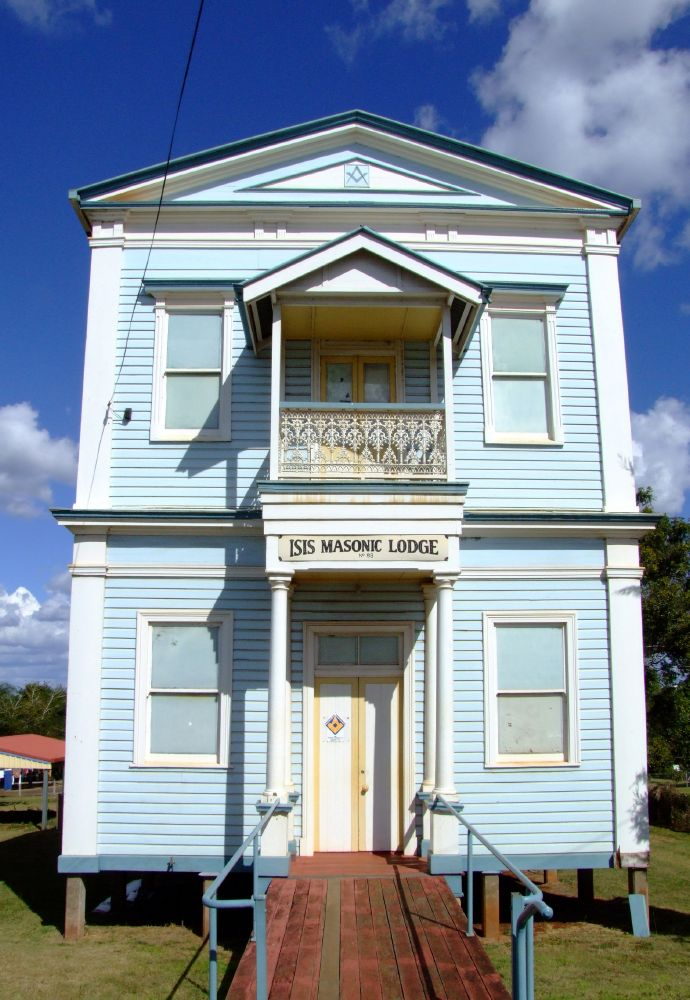
- Isis Masonic Lodge, 2008

- Location within Queensland Location within Australia
- 25.2378°S 152.2782°E
- Location: 18 Macrossan Street, Childers, Bundaberg Region, Queensland, Australia

History
- Design period: 1870s–1890s (late 19th century)
- Built: 1897–1909

Site notes
- Architect: F H Faircloth
- Architectural style: Classicism

Queensland Heritage Register
- Official name: Isis Masonic Lodge, Corinthian Lodge
- Type: state heritage (built)
- Designated: 28 April 2000
- Reference no.: 602123
- Significant period: 1897, 1909 (fabric); 1897–ongoing (social)
- Significant components: furniture/fittings

Isis Masonic Lodge is a heritage-listed masonic temple at 18 Macrossan Street, Childers, Bundaberg Region, Queensland, Australia. It was designed by F H Faircloth and built from 1897 to 1909. It is also known as Corinthian Lodge. It was added to the Queensland Heritage Register on 28 April 2000.

== History ==
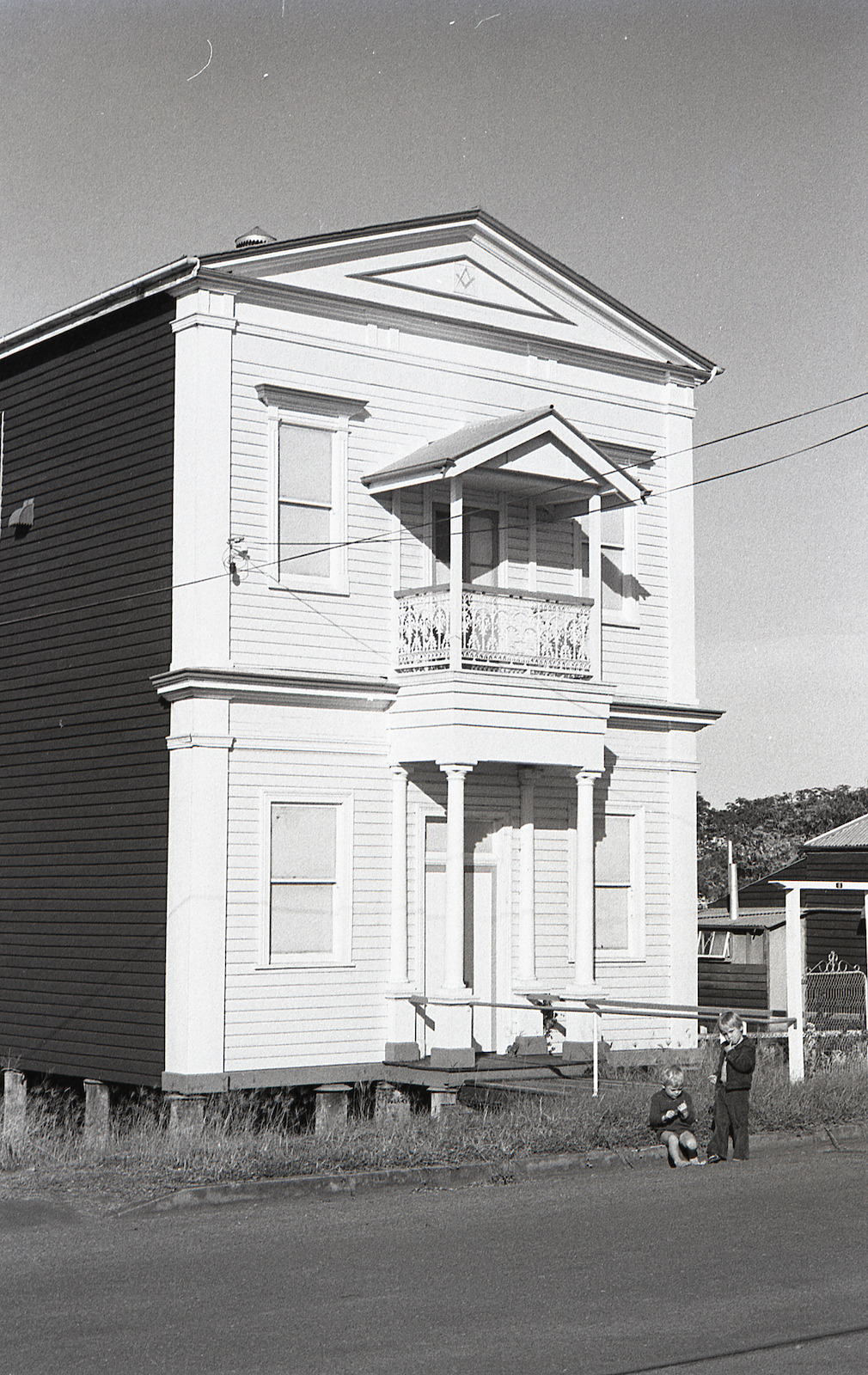
Masonic Hall, Childers, Queensland, 1975

The Isis Masonic Lodge in Childers is a two-storey timber building constructed in two stages, the first in 1897 and the second in 1909, to the design of Bundaberg architect Frederick Herbert Faircloth. Located in Macrossan Street, a block behind the main street of Childers, the building survived a major fire in the town in 1902 and remains as one of the oldest buildings in the town.

In the 1870s timber cutters were the first European settlers to come to the area surrounding Childers, attracted by large quantities of hoop pine, red cedar and other timbers. The town was established during the 1880s after the land in the nearby area was surveyed into 50-acre (20 ha) farm blocks in 1882. There was no official town survey and Childers developed following the private subdivision of portions 870 and 871, at the railhead of the 1887 Isis railway line from Isis Junction. On 31 December 1886, the Isis Divisional Board was proclaimed and the extension of the railway to Childers in 1887 provided further impetus for the development of the town.

The Freemasonry movement was an integral part of community life in the 19th century and the establishment of a Lodge was a local event representing progress and consolidation of the community. The first meeting of Freemasons in the Childers district took place in 1894 and was called by Constable Richard Henderson and Thomas Gaydon, a local chemist. Early members came from all three constitutions of the time, the English, Scottish and Irish and a vote was taken at a second meeting in January 1895 which resolved to establish a Lodge under the English constitution. This was achieved in April of the same year with the inauguration of the Corinthian Lodge No. 2573 EC. There were 14 founding members and the Master was Worshipful Brother Robert Henry Blisset who had been master of the Star of the East Lodge in Maryborough.

The opening ceremony and consecration of the Corinthian Lodge took place in the Isis Divisional Board's Office on 4 April 1895. Subsequent lodge meetings were held in the Childers schoolroom, with furniture and regalia provided by sponsor Lodges in Maryborough and Bundaberg. Members paid a joining fee of £1/1/- for members of English Constitution Lodges and £1/11/6 for members of other constitutions, a portion of which went towards a building fund.

A hall committee was formed in July 1896 and the land in Macrossan Street was purchased in April 1897 upon this committee's recommendation, at a cost of £30. Members of the lodge cleared the land and donated money and goods towards the new hall. A single storey timber hall was proposed and funding was provided in the form of a loan from Wor. Bro. Blissett who matched the interest rates offered by the Bank of North Queensland. Bundaberg architect F Herbert Faircloth was commissioned to provide plans in 1897.

Herbert Faircloth was responsible for the design of a large number of buildings in Childers, particularly after a disastrous fire destroyed most of the main street in March 1902. Born in Maryborough in 1870, Faircloth was articled to the German-trained Bundaberg architect Anton Hettrich and practised for most of his life in Bundaberg, designing many of the town's major buildings.

The first Lodge meeting was held in the new hall on 8 October 1897. By 1908 it became apparent that the hall was not big enough and Faircloth was again approached to provide plans for an additional storey to the hall. JE Sharpe's tender of £368 was accepted and the enlarged hall was consecrated on 9 July 1909.

Two storey halls were a popular form for Lodges in Queensland - the upper floor would be reserved for Lodge meetings and the lower floor provided space for a range of public events, such as dances, euchre and smoke nights, picnics and sports days. Founded on principles of fellowship, charity and "the practice of moral and social virtue", Freemasonry thrived in the absence of Government welfare and Freemasons supported each other and their families, particularly in country areas.

In 1920, the two Grand Lodges of Queensland merged to form the United Grand Lodge of Queensland, ending years of division within the Freemasonry movement in Queensland. As a consequence, the name of the Corinthian Masonic Lodge in Childers was changed to its current name - the Isis No. 93 UGLQ first appearing in the minutes of 11 November 1921.

Minor alterations have taken place over the years, including the installation of electricity in 1915, replacement of weatherboards in 1956 and re-wiring, re-stumping and replacement of the corrugated iron roof in 1976. A kitchen and toilet have been added to the rear of the building. The building has been used continuously as a Masonic Lodge since its construction.

== Description ==
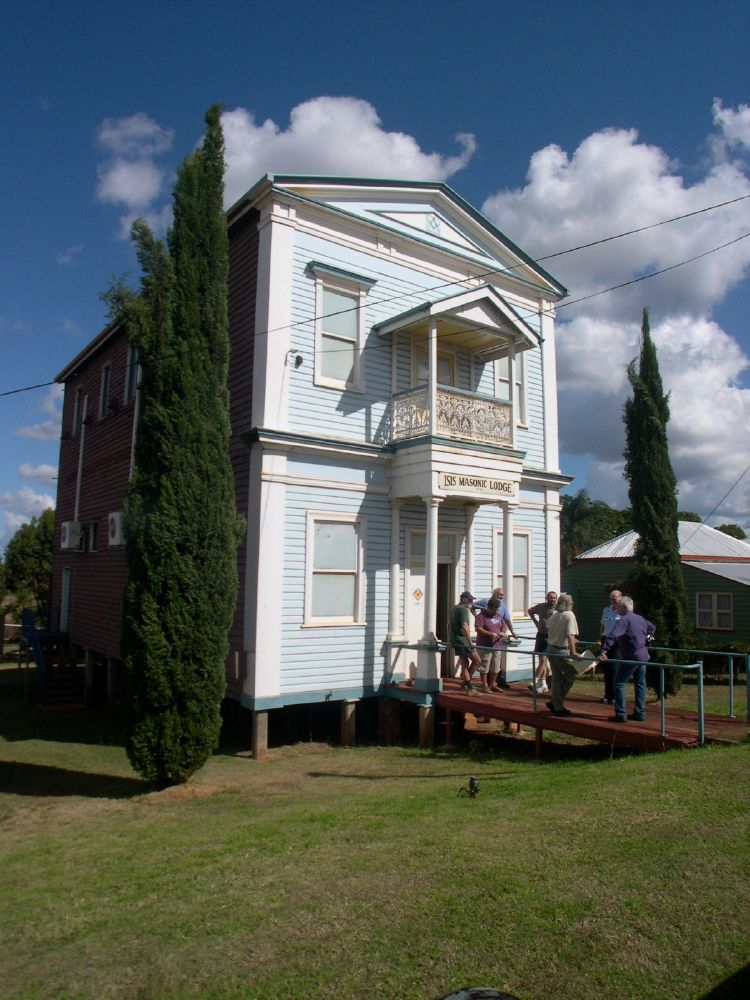
Isis Masonic Lodge, 2008

The Isis Masonic Lodge is a tall rectilinear timber building whose form and simplicity creates a striking presence in Macrossan Street, Childers. Located in a residential setting, the site is grassed and slopes away from road level with a ramp and handrail defining access to the building. Two thin pencil pines Cupressus semperzirens on either side of the entry ramp are the only plantings on the site. The building is two storey and raised on concrete and timber stumps, with an ornate facade whose parapet covers the gable end of the shallow, pitched roof. The facade is the most characteristic aspect of the building. Painted in blue and white, the colours of Freemasonry, the front stands out starkly against the undecorated sides and back of the building.

The front elevation is symmetrically composed around a central entrance which consists of doorways and a porch. The porch has a gable roof at the upper level, supported on timber posts with a decorative wrought iron balustrade to the balcony which is accessed via French doors. The porch is supported at ground level by timber Tuscan columns surmounted by a simple entablature bearing the name of the Lodge and a sign commemorating its centenary. The columns are mounted on pedestals. The central entrance consists of a pair of timber doors with a fanlight above and moulded architrave. The doorway is flanked by double hung timber windows on both levels. At upper level, the architrave of these windows takes the form of mini-pilasters supporting a moulded lintel.

The front elevation is finished in chamferboards. Pilasters are located at the corners, separated by a protruding string course at first floor level. The upper level pilasters support an entablature and pediment with simple timber mouldings and the symbols of Freemasonry are located within the tympanum. The sides and back of the building are clad in weatherboards with four aluminium framed windows at the upper level and three smaller windows at the lower level. Five small wall vents with iron hoods are located between the windows on the top floor on both sides of the building.

The planning of the interior of the building is simple, the front section contains anterooms and a stairwell with the rest of the building occupied by hall-like spaces on both levels. On the ground floor, there is a wide entry hall decorated with framed photographs of early members of the Lodge, the Queen and photographs of the building over time. A door opening leads to a large square room with timber columns located down the centre of the room. The room is lined in horizontal tongue-in-groove boarding. On the eastern wall are small timber display cases which contain a collection of Lodge cards. Two doors at the back of the room lead to a small kitchen and toilet, both lined in fibro-cement boarding with recent aluminium framed windows. A small servery hatch is located in the wall between the kitchen and the hall. A cast iron ladder leading to a hatch to the upper hall which serves as a fire escape is situated in the south-eastern corner of the kitchen. A set of timber stairs outside the toilet in the south-western corner leads to the undercroft space where another toilet is to be found.

The staircase is located on the eastern side of the entry space and features a cedar balustrade with turned balusters and substantial newels. The stairwell and anterooms on both levels are lined with horizontal tongue-in-groove boarding, painted with a colour scheme of a dark brown dado, cream walls and white ceilings. Floors are timber.

A small storage room is located at the top of the stairs and a narrow landing leads to the main Lodge room which is entered via a door at the eastern side of the building. The main room is lined in horizontal tongue-in-groove boarding painted in tones of blue and white. The floor is carpeted in a strong blue colour with the central feature of a tessellated timber board of black and white squares which was given to the Isis Lodge when the Tiaro Lodge was closed down. Furniture and regalia is unfixed and includes bench seating, a number of ornate timber chairs and several staves. The ceiling has a number of decorative ceiling roses.

== Heritage listing ==
The Isis Masonic Lodge was listed on the Queensland Heritage Register on 28 April 2000 having satisfied the following criteria.

The place is important in demonstrating the evolution or pattern of Queensland's history.

The Isis Masonic Lodge is important in illustrating the evolution of Queensland's history having been constructed during a period of unprecedented growth in the Isis, when Childers emerged as the centre of a substantial sugar-growing district and major social, cultural and religious institutions were established in the town.

The place is important in demonstrating the principal characteristics of a particular class of cultural places.

As a two-storey, timber hall with decorative timber detailing and blue and white colour scheme, the Isis Masonic Hall demonstrates the principal characteristics of Masonic Temples in small rural settlements.

The place is important because of its aesthetic significance.

The building has aesthetic significance derived from its fine yet simple design and timber detailing and its striking presence in the streetscape.

The place has a strong or special association with a particular community or cultural group for social, cultural or spiritual reasons.

The place has a strong and special association with the Childers community, in particular local Freemasons and their families, as the principal and symbolic place for the practice of Freemasonry in the town and an important centre for cultural and social activities for over 100 years.
