= Ellwood & Co Drapery =

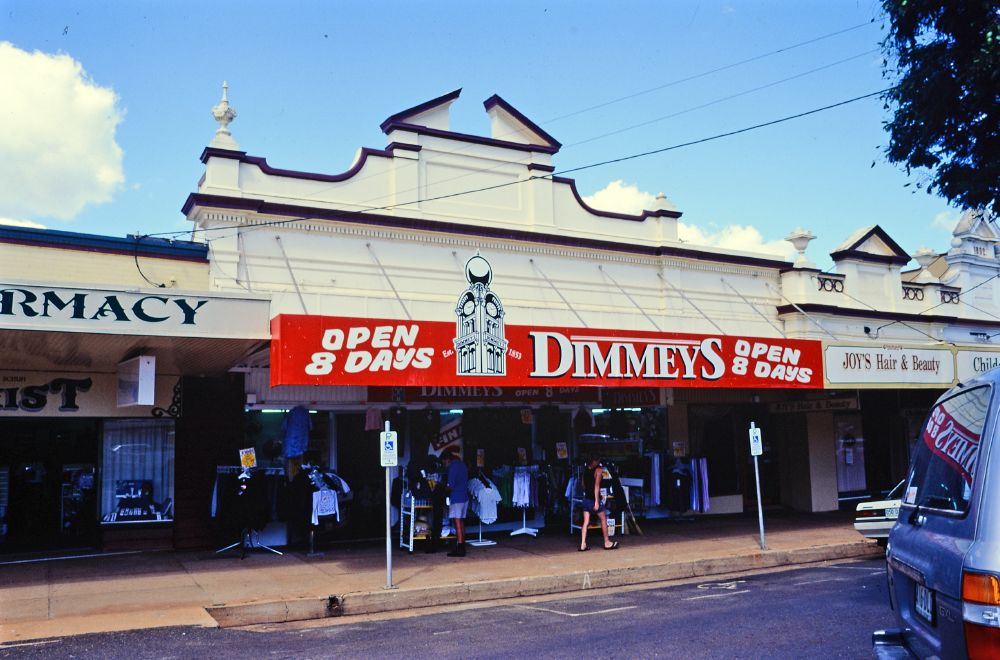
- Former Ellwood & Co Drapery, 1996

- Location within Queensland Location within Australia
- 25.2368°S 152.279°E
- Location: 62 Churchill Street, Childers, Bundaberg Region, Queensland, Australia

History
- Design period: 1900–1914 (early 20th century)
- Built: c. 1907

Site notes
- Architect: F H Faircloth
- Architectural style: Classicism

Queensland Heritage Register
- Official name: Ellwood & Co Drapery (former), F. Ellwood & Co Drapery, Boys Department Store, Dimmeys, Joys Hairdress
- Type: state heritage (built)
- Designated: 21 October 1992
- Reference no.: 600617
- Significant period: 1900s (fabric) c. 1907–ongoing (historical use)

Ellwood & Co Drapery is a heritage-listed shop at 62 Churchill Street, Childers, Bundaberg Region, Queensland, Australia. It was designed by F H Faircloth and built c. 1907. It is also known as F. Ellwood & Co Drapery, Boys Department Store, Dimmeys, and Joys Hairdress. It was added to the Queensland Heritage Register on 21 October 1992.

== History ==
The former F. Ellwood and Co Drapery was erected c. 1907 for William Brand senior and Robert Gant following the 1902 fire that destroyed most of the south side of Churchill Street, the main street of Childers. It may have been designed by Bundaberg architect, FW Faircloth who was responsible for much of the new building following the fire, the effects of which transformed Childers main street from a pioneer frontier township of timber and iron structures to the established centre of the flourishing Isis district with its new more substantial masonry buildings.

Following logging of the dense Isis Scrub in the 1870s, Childers, in the heart of the scrub, was promoted in the 1880s by Maryborough interests, as an agricultural district. The land in the immediate vicinity of the present town of Childers was surveyed in 1882 into 50 acres (20 ha) farm blocks. There was no official town survey; Childers developed following private subdivision at the railhead of the 1887 Isis railway line from Isis Junction. This was opened on 31 October 1887, and was intended principally to facilitate the transport of timber from the scrub.

The coming of the railway not only promoted the development of the town of Childers; it also proved the catalyst for the establishment of a sugar industry in the district in the late 1880s. At the opening of the railway to Childers, Robert Cran, owner of Maryborough's Yengarie mill, announced that he would erect a double crushing juice mill at Doolbi, to supply his mill at Yengarie. This was completed in 1890, with the juice being brought in railway tankers from the Isis. Further expansion of the sugar industry in the Isis was closely related to the activities of the Colonial Sugar Refining Company, which erected a central crushing mill in the district 1893–94, and began crushing in 1895. By 1895, at least three other mills had been established in the Isis, with another two under construction, and Childers had emerged as the flourishing centre of a substantial sugar-growing district.

1902 was a very dry year and Childers had no fire brigade. On 23 March, a catastrophic fire swept through the south side of the main street in town, where virtually all the buildings were timber and closely built. Those stores destroyed were: S Oakley, bootmaker; FD Cooper, commission agent; R Graham, fruiterer; ME Gosley, tailor; Foley, hairdresser; M Redmond, Palace Hotel; WB Jones, auctioneer; W Couzens, fruiterer; H Newman, general storekeeper; WJ Overell and Son, general merchants; P Christensen, cabinet maker; W Hood, stationer; T Gaydon, chemist; W Lloyd, hairdresser; Mrs Dunne, fruiterer; Federal Jewellery Company; Dunn Bros, saddlers; H Wegner, bootmaker. The Bundaberg architect F H Faircloth was engaged to redesign most of the replacement buildings and called the first tenders in June 1902.

Frederic Herbert (Herb) Faircloth was born in Maryborough in 1870 and was a pupil of German-trained Bundaberg architect Anton Hettrich. Faircloth set up his own practice in Bundaberg in 1893 and was very successful, eventually being responsible for the design of almost every important building in Bundaberg. He was also to have a major effect on the appearance and character of Childers.

Photographs taken before the fire show shops of single skin timber construction on this site and this is probably the location of Oakley the bootmaker's premises as his wife, Emma owned the land from 1896. Like the other shops rebuilt after the 1902 fire, the new building was a single storey masonry building with a classically detailed pediment, generous glass window fronts, and decorative columns supporting the awning over the footpath. Unlike many others, it appears to have been designed as a single shop, one of the largest in the main street, rather than intended for a number of different tenancies as other newly built shops were. It is not known if this was the work of Faircloth, but it was at least influenced by his work on other shops.

On completion the shop was leased to William Hood and Frederick William Ellwood as F Ellwood & Co, draper and outfitter. In 1922 it was leased to Herbert Stormonth, another draper. The shop seems to have been consistently used as a drapery and for clothing and in 1976 it was acquired by Boys Pty Ltd of Maryborough, a clothing store with branches in other towns. Boys extended their business into one shop of the group of three in the adjoining Jeffrey's Building. This is now a medical practice. A hairdressing salon now occupies a part of Ellwood's building as a separately owned shop, but the main occupancy is Dimmeys, a clothing store.

== Description ==
The former Ellwood's Drapery is a single story masonry shop on the south side of Churchill Street, Childers main street. In common with other shops on this side of the street, it has a corrugated iron roof concealed by a classical revival parapet which is topped by a broken pediment flanked by a pair of urns.

The awning across the footpath is now cantilevered and the building has modern shop fronts and a refitted interior. The section of the building occupied as a hairdresser has had the shop front reconstructed to resemble its original form.

== Heritage listing ==
The former Ellwood & Co Drapery was listed on the Queensland Heritage Register on 21 October 1992 having satisfied the following criteria.

The place is important in demonstrating the evolution or pattern of Queensland's history.

The former drapery is important in demonstrating the evolution of Queensland's history representing evidence of the development of Childers in the early twentieth century, in particular, the rebuilding of the south side of the main street in the early 1900s following the 1902 fire. Together with much of the southern side of Childers main street it provides clear evidence of the impact of fire on Queensland towns where adequate water supply and fire services were lacking.

The place is important in demonstrating the principal characteristics of a particular class of cultural places.

It is important in demonstrating the principal characteristics of early 1900s country town masonry commercial buildings, in particular the awnings, shop fronts, lanterns, and overall form.

The place is important because of its aesthetic significance.

It contributes to the picturesque townscape of Churchill Street which is both remarkably architecturally coherent and intact

The place has a special association with the life or work of a particular person, group or organisation of importance in Queensland's history.

It has a special association with the life and work of Bundaberg architect FH Faircloth who was responsible for much of the appearance of the town of Childers in the twentieth century.
