= Childers Pharmaceutical Museum =

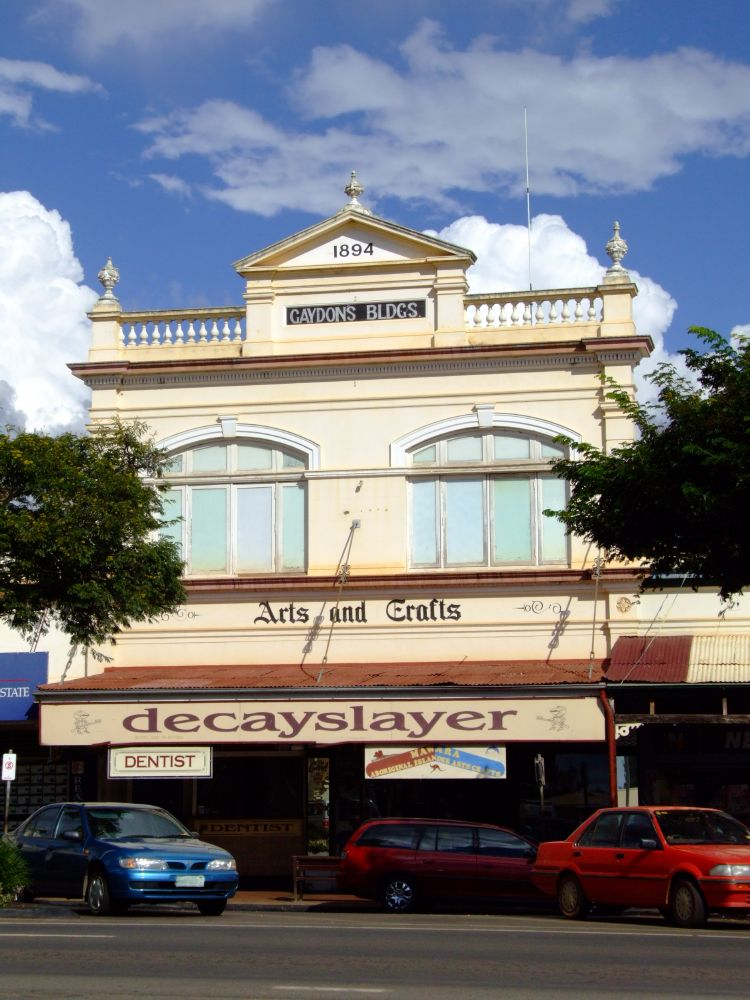
- Childers Pharmaceutical Museum, 2008

- Location within Queensland Location within Australia
- 25.237°S 152.2781°E
- Location: 88–90 Churchill Street, Childers, Bundaberg Region, Queensland, Australia

History
- Design period: 1900–1914 (early 20th century)
- Built: 1902–1909

Site notes
- Architect: F H Faircloth
- Architectural style: Classicism

Queensland Heritage Register
- Official name: Childers Pharmaceutical Museum & Tourist Information Centre, Gaydon's Pharmacy
- Type: state heritage (built)
- Designated: 21 October 1992
- Reference no.: 600628
- Significant period: 1900s (fabric); 1902–c. 1982 (historical use as pharmacy); 1989–ongoing (historical – pharmaceutical museum)
- Significant components: furniture/fittings, objects (movable) – health/care services

Childers Pharmaceutical Museum is a heritage-listed former pharmacy and now museum, located at 88–90 Churchill Street, Childers, Bundaberg Region, Queensland, Australia. It was designed by F H Faircloth, and built from 1902 to 1909. It is also known as Gaydon's Pharmacy and Tourist Information Centre. It was added to the Queensland Heritage Register on 21 October 1992.

== History ==
The former Gaydon's Pharmacy is one of a row of shops erected in 1902 to the design of Bundaberg architect FH Faircloth, following a fire that destroyed most of the south side of Churchill Street, the main street of Childers. Faircloth was responsible for much of the new building following the fire, the effects of which transformed the appearance of Childers. Extended to two storeys in 1909, the pharmacy housed several important services to the town and, retaining extremely intact contents, has become a pharmaceutical museum in recent years.

Childers is located in what was once the heart of the Isis Scrub. Following logging of the dense scrub in the 1870s, Childers was promoted in the 1880s by Maryborough interests as an agricultural district. The land in the immediate vicinity of the present town of Childers was surveyed in 1882 into 50-acre farm blocks. There was no official town survey; Childers developed following private subdivision at the railhead of the 1887 Isis railway line from Isis Junction. This was opened on 31 October 1887, and was intended principally to facilitate the transport of timber from the scrub.

The coming of the railway not only promoted the development of the town of Childers; it also proved the catalyst for the establishment of a sugar industry in the district in the late 1880s. At the opening of the railway to Childers, Robert Cran, owner of Maryborough's Yengarie mill, announced that he would erect a double crushing juice mill at Doolbi, to supply his mill at Yengarie. This was completed in 1890, with the juice being brought in railway tankers from the Isis. Further expansion of the sugar industry in the Isis was closely related to the activities of the Colonial Sugar Refining Company, which erected a central crushing mill in the district 1893–94, and began crushing in 1895. By 1895, at least three other mills had been established in the Isis, with another two under construction, and Childers had emerged as the flourishing centre of a substantial sugar-growing district.

Thomas Gaydon arrived in Childers in 1894, four years after completing his pharmaceutical apprenticeship in Brisbane. Initially he was employed in the Thomas Brothers' pharmacy which was opposite the post office.

He established "The Isis Pharmacy" as one of the first shops in the main street. He and William Hood needed to clear the block with axes and mattocks. Hood set up as a tobacconist and stationer. In September 1899, resub 18 of sub 3 of portion 840 was transferred to Thomas Gaydon and William Hood as joint tenants. This was probably the land on which their adjoining timber shops were built.

1902 was a very dry year and Childers had no fire brigade. On 23 March, a catastrophic fire swept through the south side of the main street in town, where virtually all the buildings were timber and closely built. Those stores destroyed were: S Oakley, bootmaker; FD Cooper, commission agent; R Graham, fruiterer; ME Gosley, tailor; Foley, hairdresser; M Redmond, Palace Hotel; WB Jones, auctioneer; W Couzens, fruiterer; H Newman, general storekeeper; WJ Overell and Son, general merchants; P Christensen, cabinet maker; W Hood, stationer; T Gaydon, chemist; W Lloyd, hairdresser; Mrs Dunne, fruiterer; Federal Jewellery Company; Dunn Bros, saddlers; H Wegner, bootmaker.

The Bundaberg architect F H Faircloth was engaged to redesign new premises and called tenders for the erection of eight brick shops, including Gaydons, in June 1902. Frederic Herbert (Herb) Faircloth was born in Maryborough in 1870 and was a pupil of German-trained Bundaberg architect Anton Hettrich. Faircloth set up his own practice in Bundaberg in 1893 and was very successful, eventually being responsible for the design of almost every major building in Bundaberg. He was also to have a major effect on the appearance and character of Childers.

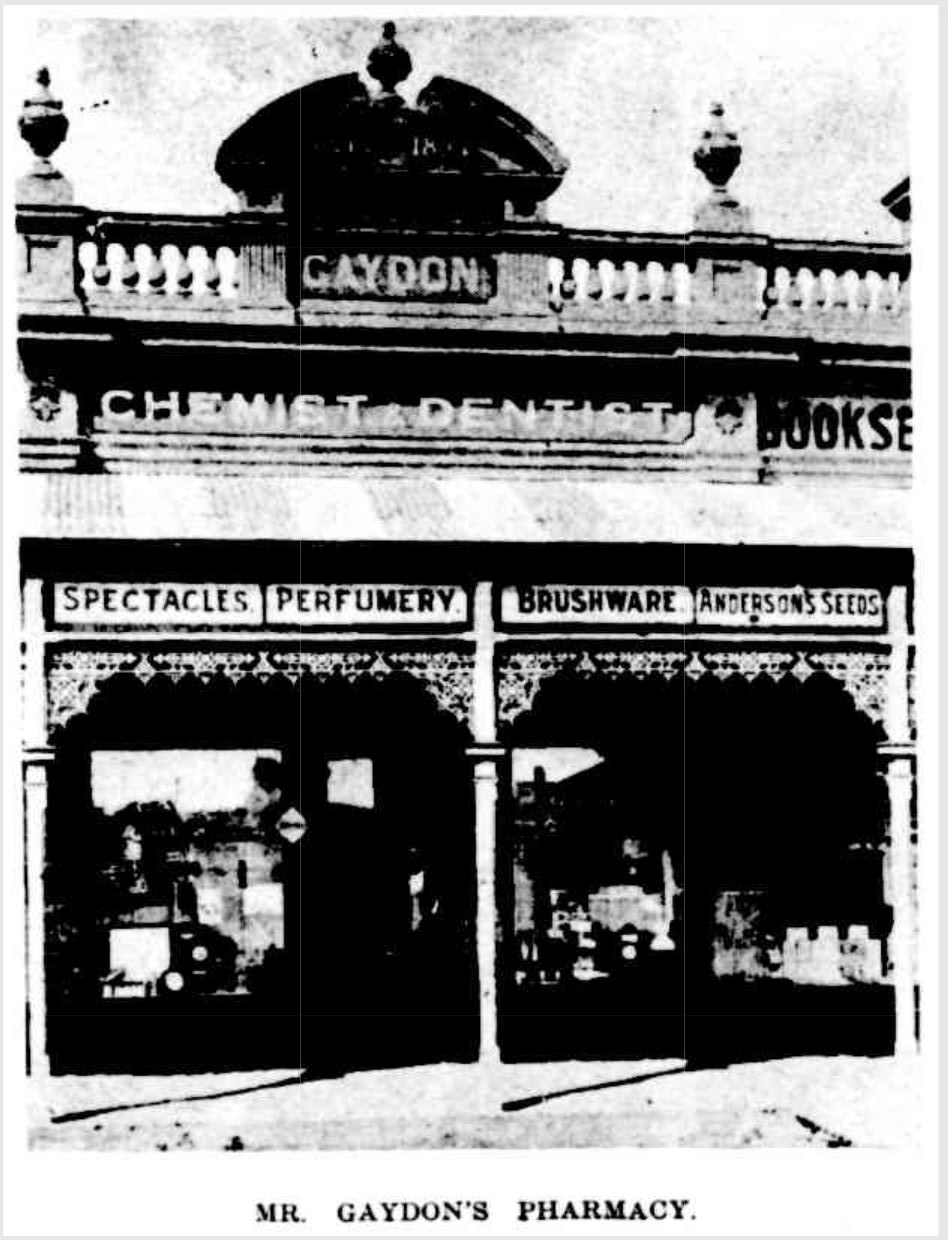
Mr Gaydon's Pharmacy, 1903

The new shops were masonry rather than timber, a choice no doubt influenced by the fire, and were elegant single-story buildings with large glass shop fronts. Striped curved awnings across the footpath were supported by decorative posts with cast iron infill. Each shop had a separate roof, some lit by lanterns and the individual tenancies were also marked by the visual separation of the facades by the use of classic revival pediments, urns, and balustrades. Gaydon's building with its broken semi-circular pediment matched the adjoining Hood's shop.

In 1911, an upper floor was added. This addition included the adjoining shop, so that a new and larger decorative pediment was created. A photograph dating from around 1913 shows that other tenants, including a bootmaker and the New Zealand Insurance Company, also used Gaydon's building. The upper floor was lit by a lantern and a pair of large compound windows and so had excellent light for its use a dental surgery by Thomas Gaydon, who in addition to his work as a pharmacist, also practised as a dentist, photographer and anaesthetist to the local hospital. He was a public-spirited man and also served as president of the Chamber of Commerce, School of Arts, hospital and School committees at various times. He was the second chairman of the Isis Shire Council in 1919 and served in this role again between 1924 and 1930.

Following the death of Thomas Gaydon in 1935, the property was transferred to his two sons, T. Geoffrey Gaydon (a dentist) and S. Noel Gaydon (a chemist) who both practised from the premises. In 1938, Mervyn G Hooper joined the staff as a chemist and went into partnership with Noel Gaydon in 1956. When Noel Gaydon died in 1966, Hooper continued the business and the property was transferred to his wife in 1973. In 198,2 Mervyn Hooper died and the then pharmacy was operated as a gift shop (with all pharmaceutical material retained) by his widow Isbell (known as Isa) Hooper. In 1987, the shop ceased trading and was acquired by a new owner.

The Isis Shire Council leased the building, after purchasing the contents, catalogued items and carried out conservation work. In 1989, Gaydons Pharmacy opened as a pharmaceutical museum with an art gallery on the upper floor. The work undertaken by the Isis Shire Council to prepare the building for use as a museum, tourist office, and gallery received a National Trust of Queensland John Herbert Award for Conservation Action in 1989. As at 2016, the Bundaberg Regional Council owned the building and the Isis Historical Society managed the collections within it.

== Description ==
The Pharmaceutical Museum is a two-story masonry building in a row of shops on the south side of Churchill Street, Childers main street. It is a rectangular building with its long axis at right angles to the street and has twin gabled roofs clad in corrugated iron concealed by a parapet. In common with a number of shops on this side of the street, the building has a classical revival pediment with a balustraded parapet topped by urns and is lit by a lantern. The date 1894 is shown in raised letters on the pediment with the name Gaydon's Buildings below. The upper floor is also lit by a pair of multi-paned windows with curved heads to the street and plain sash windows at the rear. The shop's front has a central recessed entry and display windows featuring lead lighting friezes and early signwriting. They are shaded by an awning to the street lined with decorative pressed metal. The interior is laid out with a shop at the front and offices and dispensary area to the rear. The upper floor is an art gallery. The interior is extraordinarily intact and includes furniture, fittings, counters, shelving, drawers and their contents and stock. Equipment such as the cash register and dental chair and tools and account and prescription books belonging to Gaydon's Pharmacy are preserved. The whole forms an archive of information on the operation of an early twentieth century pharmacy. 137 items from the Wickham House pharmacy in Brisbane have been added to the collection.

== Heritage listing ==
The Childers Pharmaceutical Museum was listed on the Queensland Heritage Register on 21 October 1992 having satisfied the following criteria.

The place is important in demonstrating the evolution or pattern of Queensland's history.

It is important in demonstrating the evolution of Queensland's history, showing the development of Childers in the early twentieth century and in particular the rebuilding of the south side of the main street in the early 1900s following the 1902 fire. Together with much of the southern side of Childers main street it provides evidence of the impact of fire on many Queensland towns with limited water supply.

The place demonstrates rare, uncommon or endangered aspects of Queensland's cultural heritage.

It is one of only two pharmaceutical museums in Australia and is very rare in retaining a high level of its own early fittings, equipment and stock.

The place has potential to yield information that will contribute to an understanding of Queensland's history.

Because of this rarity, it has the potential to contribute considerably to an understanding of the work of early dispensing chemists, particularly in country towns where they might provide a wide range of services.

The place is important in demonstrating the principal characteristics of a particular class of cultural places.

It is important in demonstrating the principal characteristics of early 1900s country town masonry commercial buildings, in particular the awnings, shop fronts, lanterns, and overall form.

The place is important because of its aesthetic significance.

It contributes to the picturesque appearance of Churchill Street which is both remarkably architecturally coherent and intact.

The place has a strong or special association with a particular community or cultural group for social, cultural or spiritual reasons.

The Pharmaceutical Museum has strong associations with the Childers community as a provider of pharmaceutical, dental and photographic services for many years and is now an important community building.

The place has a special association with the life or work of a particular person, group or organisation of importance in Queensland's history.

It has a special association with the life and work of Thomas Gaydon, chemist, dentist, anaesthetist and photographer to Childers area, and also as the work of Bundaberg architect FH Faircloth.
