= Hardware store (disambiguation) =

A hardware store is a place to buy household hardware.

Hardware store may also refer to:

- Hardware Store, Childers, a heritage-listed row of shops in Queensland, Australia
- "Hardware Store", a song in "Weird Al" Yankovic's Poodle Hat album
