= Federal Hotel, Childers =

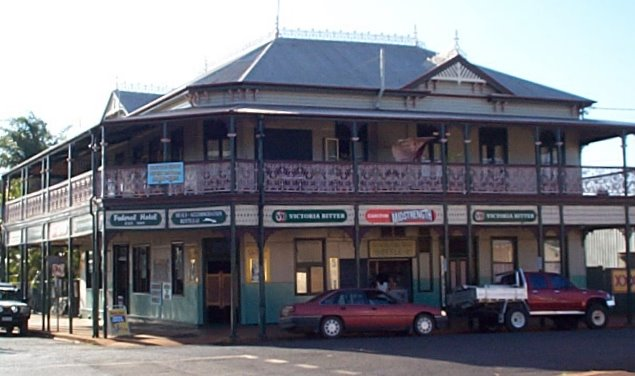
- Federal Hotel, 2006

- Location within Queensland Location within Australia
- 25.2362°S 152.277°E
- Location: 71 Churchill Street, Childers, Bundaberg Region, Queensland, Australia

History
- Design period: 1900–1914 (early 20th century)
- Built: c. 1907
- Built for: William Ashby

Queensland Heritage Register
- Official name: Federal Hotel
- Type: state heritage (built)
- Designated: 21 October 1992
- Reference no.: 600622
- Significant period: 1900s (fabric) c. 1907–ongoing (historical use, social)
- Significant components: kitchen/kitchen house

Federal Hotel is a heritage-listed hotel at 71 Churchill Street, Childers, Bundaberg Region, Queensland, Australia. It was built c. 1907. It was added to the Queensland Heritage Register on 21 October 1992.

== History ==
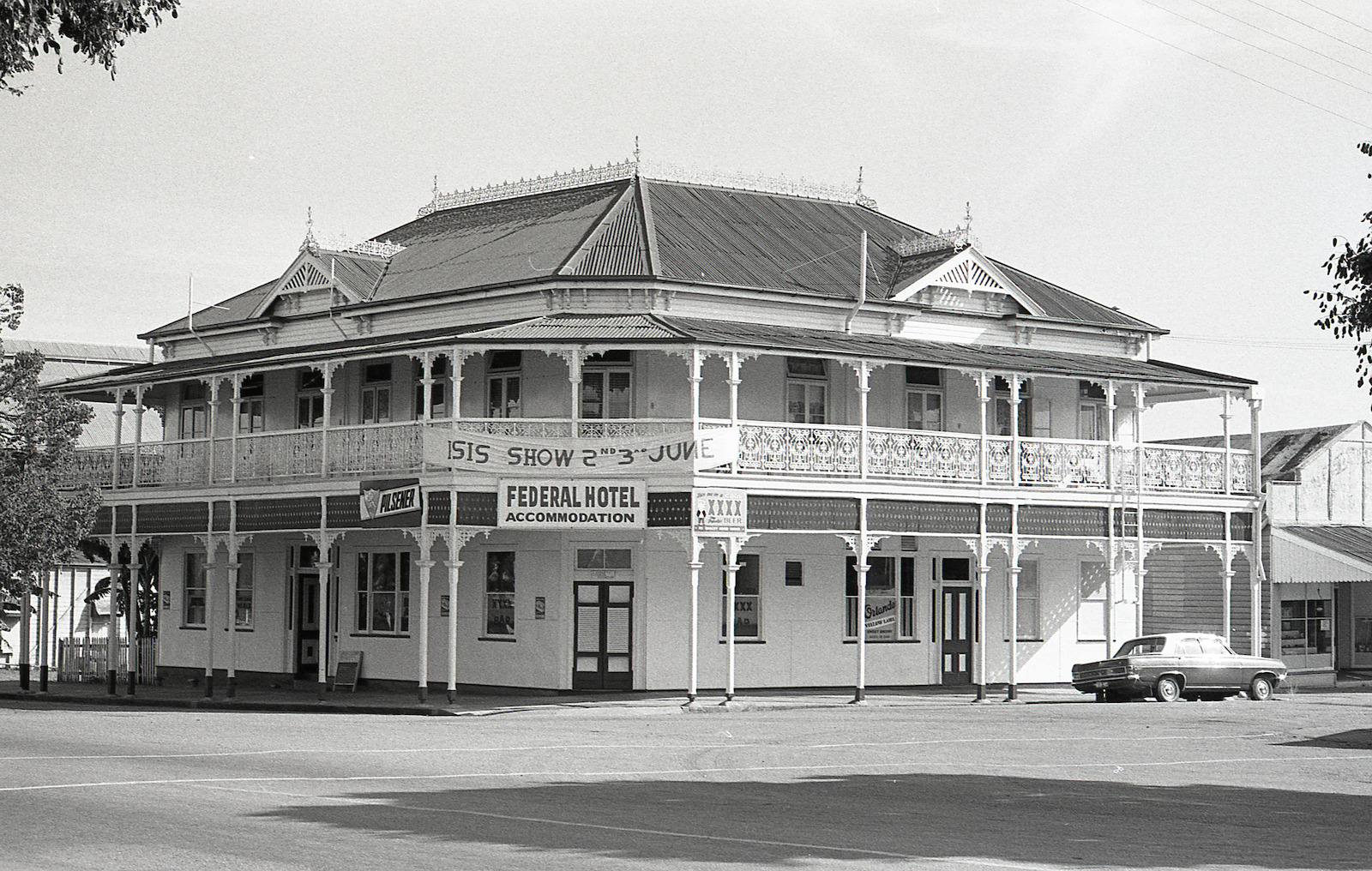
Federal House, in Childers, Queensland, 1975.

The Federal Hotel is a two-storey timber hotel on a major street intersection at Childers and was constructed c. 1907 for hotelier William Ashby, following the redevelopment of the town centre after a major fire in 1902.

Following logging of the dense Isis Scrub in the 1870s, Childers, in the heart of the scrub, was promoted in the 1880s by Maryborough interests as an agricultural district. The land in the immediate vicinity of the present town of Childers was surveyed in 1882 into 50-acre farm blocks. There was no official town survey; Childers developed following the private subdivision of portions 870 and 871, at the railhead of the 1887 Isis railway line from Isis Junction. This was opened on 31 October 1887, and was intended principally to facilitate the transport of timber from the scrub.

William Ashby, who had arrived in Bundaberg in 1868, owned the first hotel in Childers. He moved to the Isis in the early 1800s and took up a large selection near Horton, building a hotel near the racecourse there. In 1886, he moved the hotel building to Childers and enlarged it as the "Childers Hotel". Ashby also acquired adjoining allotments, a store and butchery and was a member of the Isis Divisional Board. The area developed quickly as the coming of the railway not only promoted the development of the town of Childers; it also proved the catalyst for the establishment of a sugar industry in the district in the late 1880s. At the opening of the railway to Childers, Robert Cran, owner of Maryborough's Yengarie mill, announced that he would erect a double crushing juice mill at Doolbi, to supply his mill at Yengarie. This was completed in 1890, with the juice being brought in railway tankers from the Isis. Further expansion of the sugar industry in the Isis was closely related to the activities of the Colonial Sugar Refining Company, which erected a central crushing mill in the district 1893–94, and began crushing in 1895. By 1895, at least three other mills had been established in the Isis, with another two under construction, and Childers had emerged as the flourishing centre of a substantial sugar-growing district: in the years between 1891 and 1900 the population grew from 91 to 4000.

The growth of the Isis district in the 1890s is reflected in the series of hotels constructed in Childers to accommodate travellers, businessmen and the many seasonal workers in the sugar industry. These included the Isis, Belle Vue, Royal, Queen's and Palace hotels. Ashby sold the Childers Hotel to Johann Kulick, who replaced it in 1899 with a handsome two-storey brick building called the Grand Hotel. This was the only building to survive a disastrous fire in 1902 that destroyed most of the timber buildings on that side of the main street in town. In 1902–3 the town centre was rebuilt with fashionable new brick buildings more in keeping with Childers' success, many of them to the design of F H Faircloth, a successful Bundaberg architect, who had designed the first Palace Hotel in 1897. In 1903 the old Isis Divisional Board was abolished and Isis Shire proclaimed, with the new seat of municipal government moving from Howard to Childers.

It is said locally that Ashby approached Kulick in the early 1900s with a view to purchasing the Grand Hotel, before deciding to construct a new hotel diagonally opposite the Grand. The land on which the Federal Hotel is situated was originally granted as a selection to Ernest Dyne but changed hands before being extensively subdivided into town lots in 1892. William Ashby purchased several lots of land on the corner of Churchill and North Streets in 1905 and constructed the Federal Hotel around 1907. He also built a store on the adjoining block. This area of North Street appears to have developed as an offshoot of the nearby shopping area in the main street and was no doubt assisted by the presence of the hotel. The new hotel was very similar in appearance to a Gladstone hotel designed by F H Faircloth in 1900 and may also have been designed by him, as he was then carrying out extensive work in Childers, following the fire.

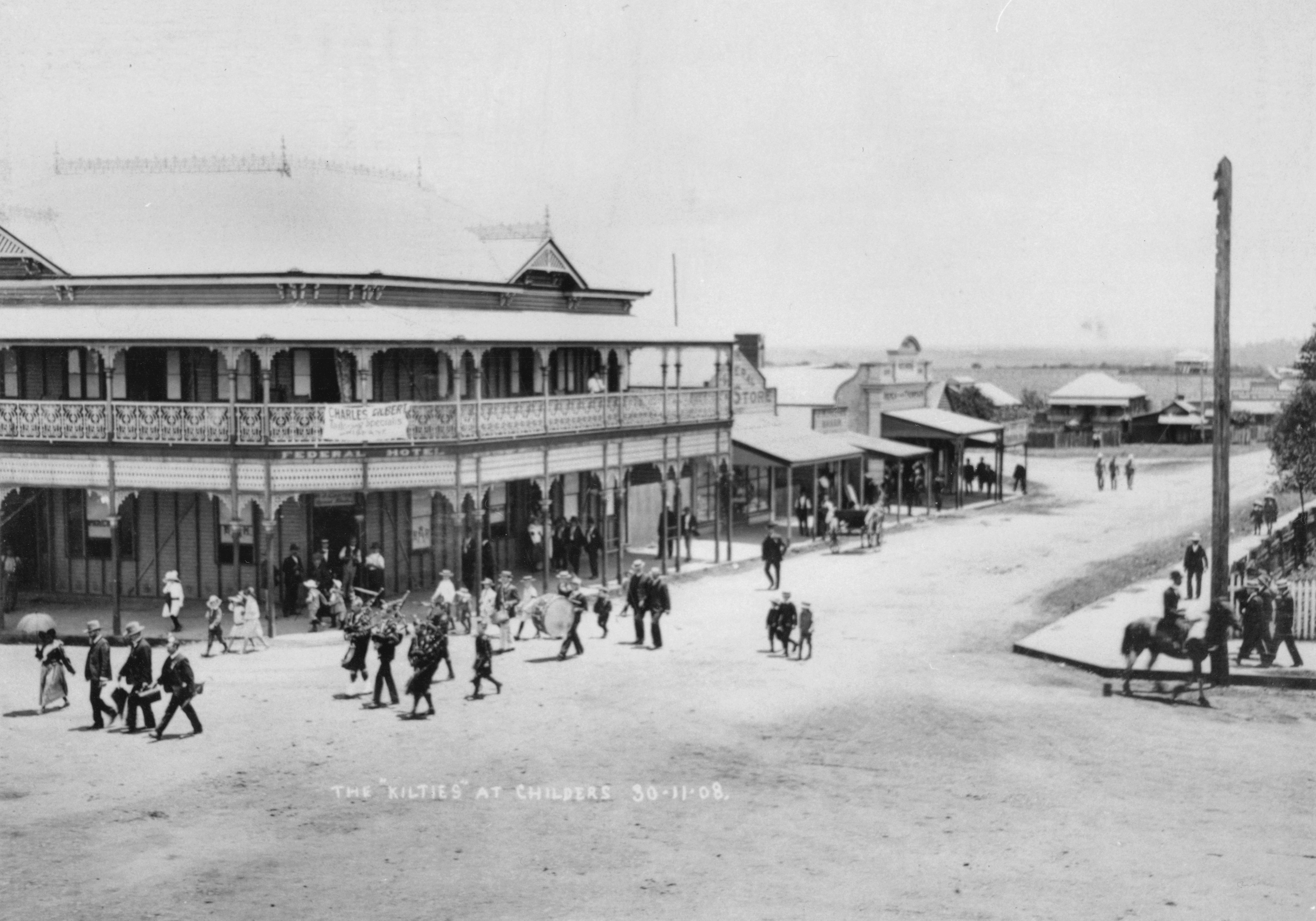
Scottish pipers passing the Federal Hotel, November 1908

The hotel was leased to Hugh Carter from 1 January 1908 and it was leased for much of its existence, though it remained in possession of the Ashby family for many years after his death in 1920. It was patronised by canecutters, in the days when the cane harvest was brought in by hand, and later by small crop pickers. In 1968, it was purchased by Earl and Josephine Gillespie, after which it changed hands frequently over the next 20 years, before being purchased by Martin and Barbara Woods in 1989. It has been extensively refurbished.

== Description ==
The Federal Hotel is a timber two-storey hotel located on the northern side of Childers main street, Churchill Street, at the corner of North Street.

The hotel is approximately L-shaped in plan with the roof, core structure and awnings truncated at the corner facing the intersection. It is set on very low stumps and has a hipped roof clad in corrugated iron with shallow decorated gables at the centre of each street elevation.

The hotel's major external feature is a two-storey verandah running along both streets, which is supported on paired and single posts with decorative cast iron brackets on both levels. The upper level has panels of cast iron balustrading above a pierced valance. The hotel has several entrances on the ground floor and accommodation on the upper floor, following the usual internal layout of two storey hotels in Queensland.

The principal entrance is at the street corner and opens onto a large public bar through bat wing doors. Leading from this on the North Street side are a further bar and dining area. On the Churchill Street side is a second major entrance leading into a wide hall. This has a billiard room to the left and a central arch leading onto a staircase with turned balusters to the rear. There are sash windows to the ground floor rooms and timber ceilings. Although alterations have been carried out in the bar and dining areas, the hotel is generally intact in detail. There is a single storey kitchen section, which appears to have originally been detached but is now linked to the main building, set behind the dining area.

The upper floor of the hotel contains a guest lounge at the street corner and there is a kitchen and bedrooms leading off the central halls that run along each wing. French doors open onto the verandah and toilets have been added to the upper level at the rear.

There is a beer garden behind the hotel.

== Heritage listing ==
The Federal Hotel was listed on the Queensland Heritage Register on 21 October 1992 having satisfied the following criteria.

The place is important in demonstrating the evolution or pattern of Queensland's history.

The Federal Hotel is important as one of a number of hotels which were erected in Childers within a few years of each other in the late 19th and early 20th centuries, illustrating the unprecedented growth then occurring in the Isis, when Childers was emerging as the flourishing centre of a substantial sugar-growing district. Much of the built character of the town reflects the rebuilding of the commercial centre following a disastrous fire in 1902, when the simpler structures of the early settlement were replaced, largely to the design of architect George Faircloth

The place is important in demonstrating the principal characteristics of a particular class of cultural places.

The Federal Hotel, in its corner siting, form, layout and detail, is a good example of a hotel of its era. Change to the hotel has been minimal as the exterior is virtually unchanged and the layout of the interior remains much the same following renovations.

The place is important because of its aesthetic significance.

As a well designed timber building on a prominent corner site, the Federal Hotel is a landmark in the main street of Childers and contributes to the architecturally coherent and picturesque townscape.

The place has a strong or special association with a particular community or cultural group for social, cultural or spiritual reasons.

It is associated with the community of Childers as a public building that has formed part of the recreational life of the town for most of the 20th century.
