= Pizzey Memorial Clock =

- Location within Queensland Location within Australia
- 25.2362°S 152.2817°E
- Location: 63 Churchill Street, Childers, Bundaberg Region, Queensland, Australia

Queensland Heritage Register
- Official name: Clock – Pizzey Memorial
- Type: state heritage
- Designated: 21 August 1992
- Delisted: June 2015
- Reference no.: 600618

Pizzey Memorial Clock is a heritage-listed memorial originally located at 63 Churchill Street, Childers, Bundaberg Region, Queensland, Australia. It was added to the Queensland Heritage Register on 21 August 1992 but was removed from the register in June 2015 after it was reconstructed at the Childers Historical Village.

== History ==
The memorial clock commemorated Jack Pizzey, who was Premier of Queensland from 17 January 1968 until his death on 31 July that same year. Pizzey was born in Childers and was the Member of the Queensland Legislative Assembly for the local seat of Isis.

In 2000–2001, the Isis Shire Council decided to redevelop that section of Churchill Street to create the Millennium Park which would include a monument to the Kanaka workers as its feature. The Pizzey Memorial Clock was relocated to the Childers Historical Village in Taylor Street.

== Heritage listing ==
The Pizzey Memorial Clock was listed on the Queensland Heritage Register on 21 August 1992 as being important in demonstrating the evolution of Queensland's history.

== Delisting ==
In 2011, the Heritage Act was amended to allow destroyed sites to be removed from the Queensland Heritage Register. As at 2017, five sites had been removed, including the Pizzy Memorial, which was considered demolished as part of an approved development (the Millennium Park).
