= Chemist, Childers =

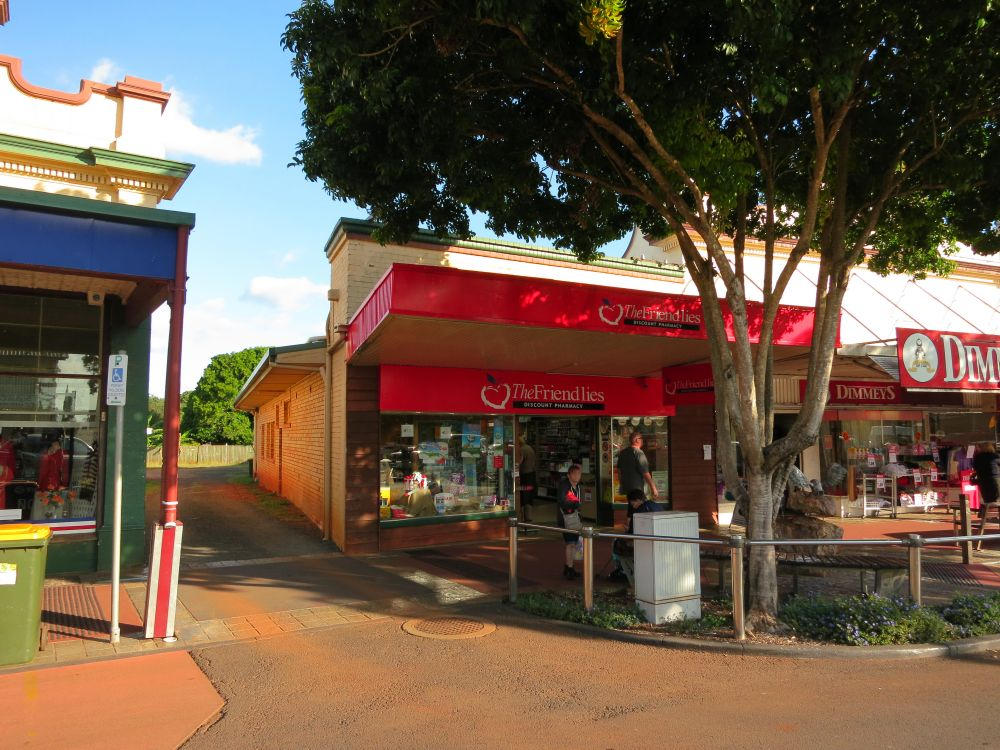
- Chemist, 60 Churchill Street, 2014

- Location within Queensland Location within Australia
- 25.2368°S 152.2791°E
- Location: 60 Churchill Street, Childers, Bundaberg Region, Queensland, Australia

Queensland Heritage Register
- Official name: Chemist 60 Churchill St
- Type: state heritage
- Designated: 21 August 1992
- Reference no.: 600615

The Chemist is a heritage-listed shop at 60 Churchill Street, Childers, Bundaberg Region, Queensland, Australia. It was added to the Queensland Heritage Register on 21 August 1992.
