= Dittmer's Store =

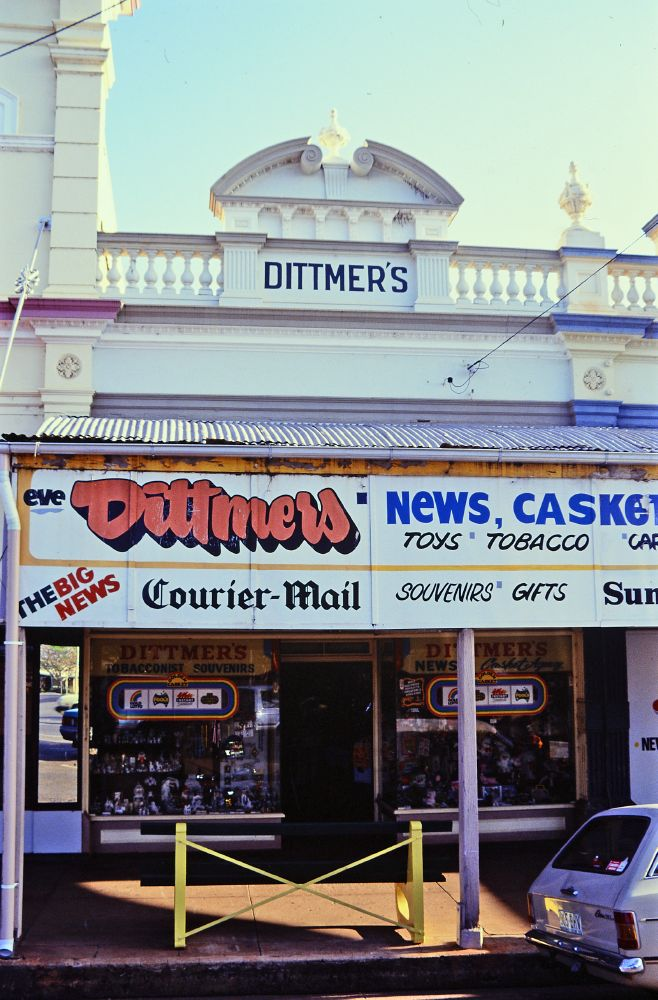
- Dittmer's Store, 1992

- Location within Queensland Location within Australia
- 25.237°S 152.278°E
- Location: 92–94 Churchill Street, Childers, Bundaberg Region, Queensland, Australia

History
- Design period: 1900–1914 (early 20th century)
- Built: circa 1902

Queensland Heritage Register
- Official name: Dittmer's Store/Isis Town and Country, Butler & Ker, James Butler
- Type: state heritage (built)
- Designated: 21 October 1992
- Reference no.: 600630
- Significant period: 1900s (fabric) c. 1902–ongoing (historical use as commercial buildings)
- Significant components: toilet block/earth closet/water closet

Dittmer's Store is a heritage-listed shop at 92–94 Churchill Street, Childers, Bundaberg Region, Queensland, Australia. It was built circa 1902. It is also known as Isis Town and Country, Butler & Ker, and James Butler. It was added to the Queensland Heritage Register on 21 October 1992.

== History ==
Dittmer's Store was erected c.1902 for chemist, Thomas Gaydon and stationer and tobacconist, William Hood, after a fire destroyed many of the shops along the southern side of Childers' main street.

The town of Childers grew up around a railway terminus opened in 1887 to facilitate timber getting in the Isis Scrub. What became the main street was subdivided into small allotments in the 1890s. In 1894, Frederick John Charlton and Henry Jardine Gray sold some 32 perches (810 m^{2}) to tinsmith, James Slater. In 1899 the property was sold to Gaydon and Hood. In March 1902 a fire destroyed the existing timber shop, which may have been operated by Slater and later, Hood. Soon after the southern side of the street was resurveyed resulting in the blocks becoming doglegged in shape. The new masonry shop was occupied by Hood, whilst next door the partners erected this store. After a second fire in the 1920s, the shop was operated as a men's mercer by LR Stevens and Benjamin Foley. Later it became an electricians shop, then a toy shop and sports store. In 1929 the shop was purchased by Thomas Gaydon's wife, Mary and remained in the Gaydon family until 1970 when it was sold again.

Gustav Dittmer was a stationer who lived in Childers from the 1920s to the 1940s. His son Felix Dittmer was a Member of the Queensland Legislative Assembly for Mount Gravatt and an Australian Senator.

== Description ==
Dittmer's Store fronts Churchill Street, the main street of Childers, to the north with rear access off Macrossan Street to the South. The single-storeyed masonry building, with an ogee-shaped corrugated iron awning, is located within a cohesive group of predominantly 1900s shops with street awnings and decorative rendered facades. The building has a corrugated iron gabled roof with a central clerestory skylight to the east and west.

The rendered street facade is surmounted by a parapet with a heavy cornice, balustrade and a rounded broken pediment supporting a single urn. The shop front has a central recessed entry with display windows to either side and a pressed metal ceiling with fixed arctic glass windows above.

The rear of the building is of face brick with supporting piers and barred windows. A freestanding brick toilet block is located adjacent to the rear entry to the building, and the rear of the site is grassed.

Internally, the building has a horizontal boarded ceiling which is raked from four sides in the centre to the clerestory skylight. Walls are rendered with some partitioning at the rear and the floor is concrete.

== Heritage listing ==
Dittmer's Store was listed on the Queensland Heritage Register on 21 October 1992 having satisfied the following criteria.

The place is important in demonstrating the evolution or pattern of Queensland's history.

The building, erected c. 1902, is important in demonstrating the evolution of Queensland's history, representing the development of Childers as a prosperous timber and sugar town, forming the heart of the Isis Shire, in the early 20th century.

The place is important in demonstrating the principal characteristics of a particular class of cultural places.

It is important in demonstrating the principal characteristics of an early 1900s country town commercial building, in particular its intactness it forms part of a cohesive group of adjoining early 1900s shops.

The place is important because of its aesthetic significance.

It is important in exhibiting a range of aesthetic characteristics valued by the Childers community, in particular its interior, clerestory skylight, and decorative facade; its unity in form, scale and materials with the adjoining store; as part of a cohesive group of adjoining early 1900s shops; and its contribution to the streetscape of Churchill Street and to the Childers townscape.
