= Bundaberg Regional Libraries =

Library service in the Bundaberg Region, Queensland, Australia

Bundaberg Regional Libraries is the main public library service provided to the people of the Bundaberg Region, by the Bundaberg Regional Council. The library collection includes an extensive array of physical and electronic resources along with a significant portion of the region's documentary heritage. The library service has four branch locations: Bundaberg, Childers, Gin Gin and Woodgate Beach. Bundaberg Regional Libraries is one of the busiest and largest library services in regional Queensland. The Library branches are popular community hubs, serve a population of around 97,000 people, hold around 130,000 items and issue a total of close to 1 million items per year.

== History ==
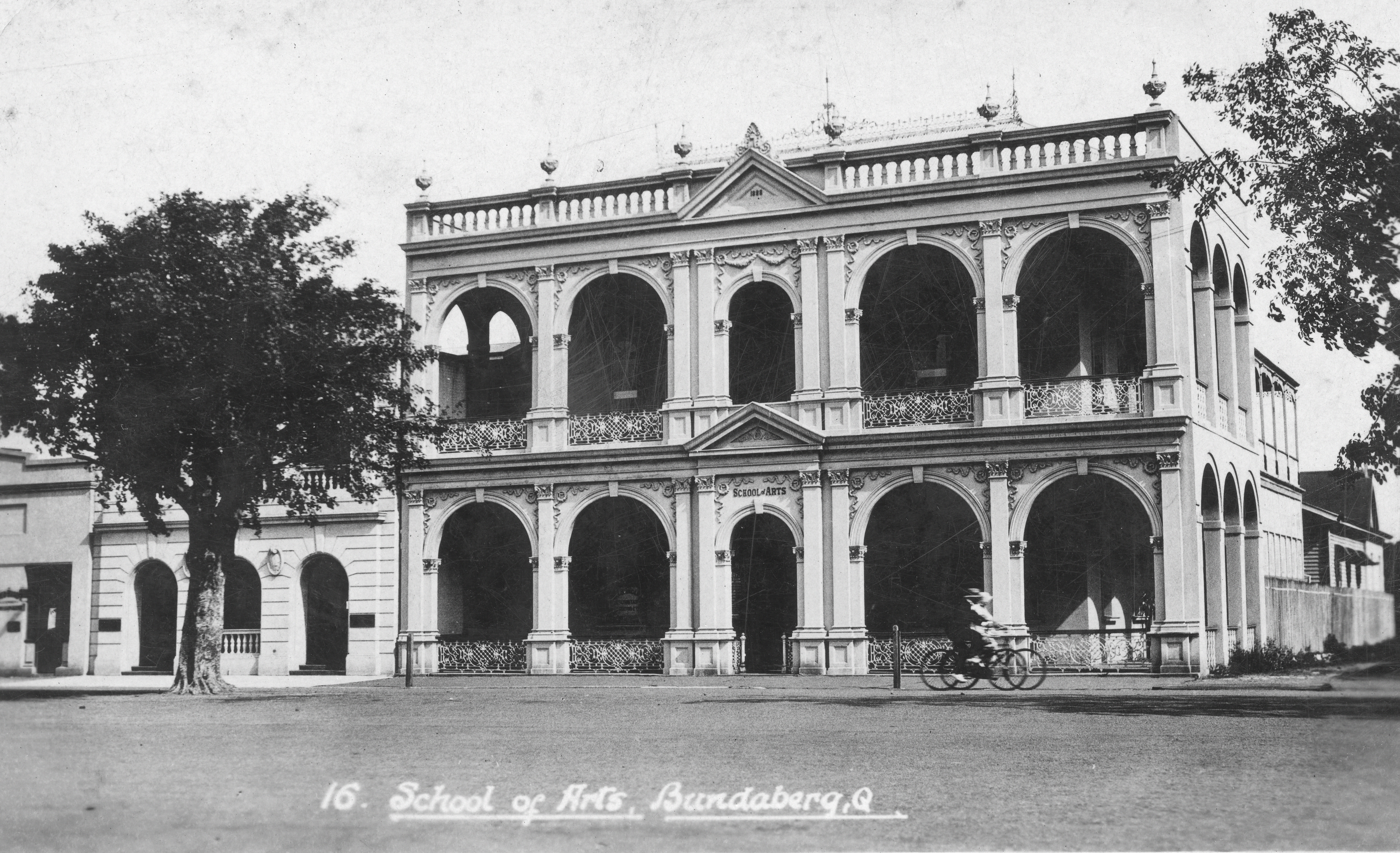
School of Arts Built approx. 1888/1889

On 15 March 2008, state-wide Council amalgamations saw the former Bundaberg City, Burnett Shire, Kolan Shire, and Isis Shire meld to form the Bundaberg Regional Council. Bundaberg Library went from being a single service library to a headquarters branch for the Bundaberg Regional Libraries, with existing libraries in Gin Gin, Childers, and Woodgate Beach also becoming branches of the new amalgamated service. The Bundaberg branch underwent a significant refurbishment from late 2011.
