= Childers RSL Club =

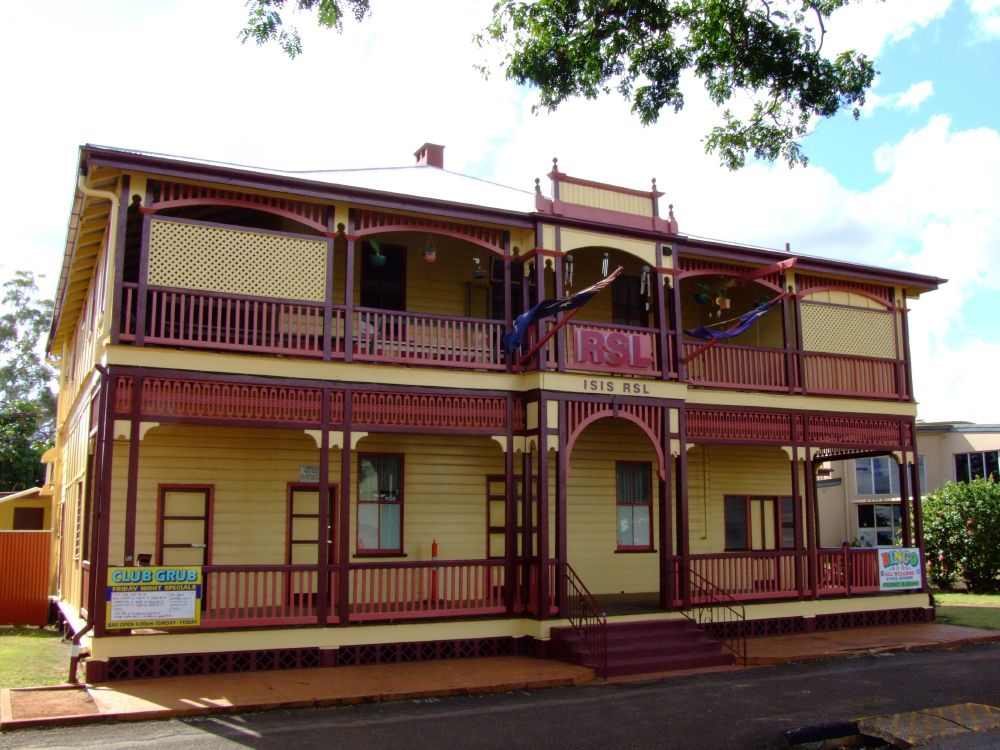
- Childers RSLA Club, 2008

- Location within Queensland Location within Australia
- 25.2359°S 152.2794°E
- Location: 55 Churchill Street, Childers, Bundaberg Region, Queensland, Australia

History
- Design period: 1900–1914 (early 20th century)
- Built: 1900–c. 1909

Site notes
- Architect: James Percy Owen Cowlishaw

Queensland Heritage Register
- Official name: Childers RSLA Club, Commercial Banking Company of Sydney, RSSAILA Club
- Type: state heritage (built)
- Designated: 21 October 1992
- Reference no.: 600613
- Significant period: 1900s (fabric); 1900–1943 (historical use); 1945–ongoing (RSLA use)
- Significant components: residential accommodation – manager's house/quarters, memorial – honour board/ roll of honour, banking chamber, strong room

Childers RSL Club is a heritage-listed former bank and now Returned and Services League of Australia club house at 55 Churchill Street, Childers, Bundaberg Region, Queensland, Australia. It was designed by James Percy Owen Cowlishaw and built from 1900 to c. 1909. It was formerly a branch of the Commercial Banking Company of Sydney and is also known as the RSSAILA Club or the Isis RSL Club. It was added to the Queensland Heritage Register on 21 October 1992.

== History ==
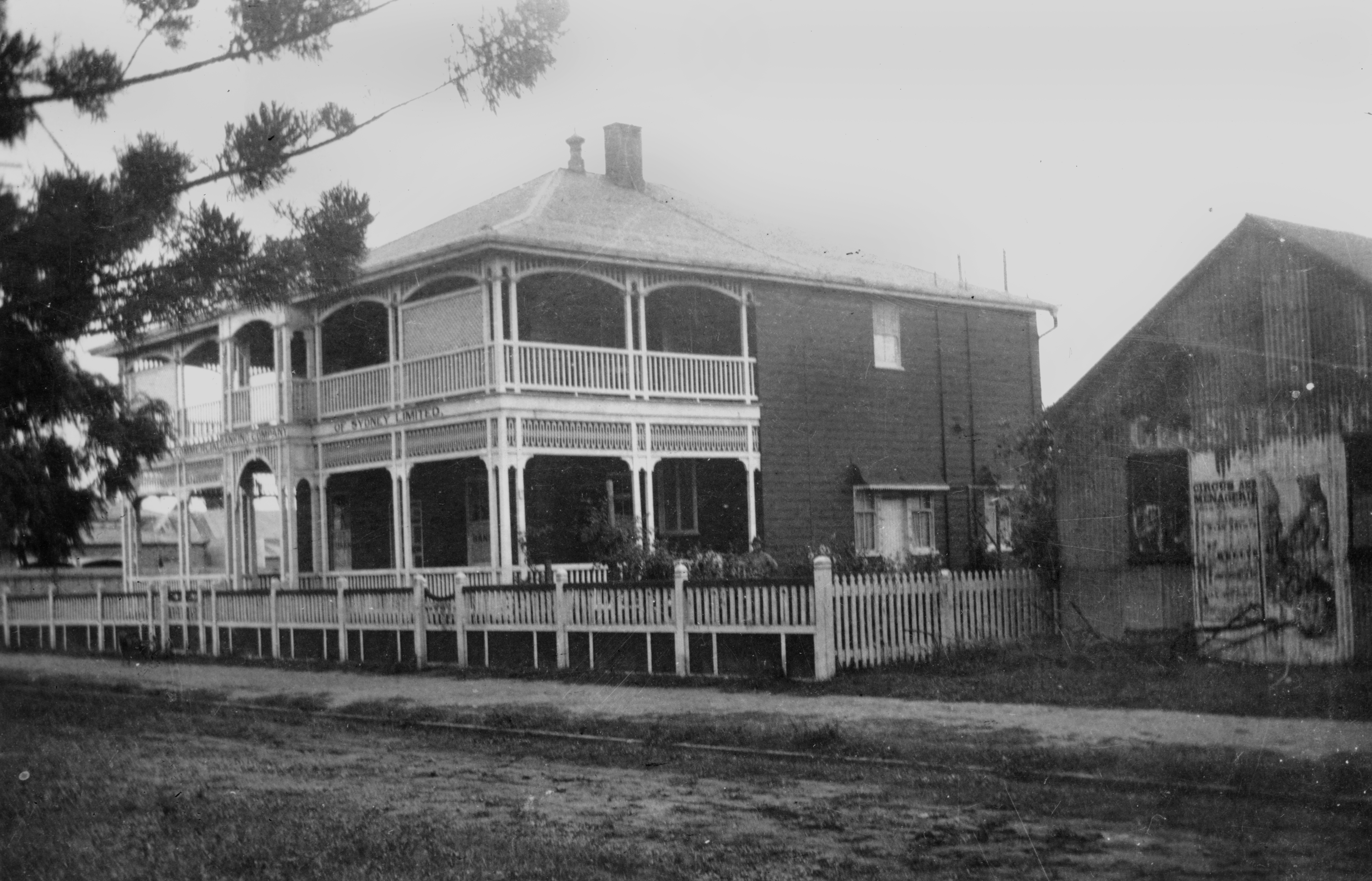
Commercial Banking Company of Sydney building, circa 1920

The Returned and Services League of Australia Club was erected in 1900 as the Childers branch of the Commercial Banking Company of Sydney Limited (CBCS). The bank was originally designed by architect James Percy Owen Cowlishaw as a single story building which in 1908 was raised to two storeys with the banking chamber located on the ground floor and manager's residence on the upper level. Following logging of the dense Isis Scrub in the 1870s, Childers, in the heart of the scrub, was promoted in the 1880s by Maryborough interests, as an agricultural district. The land in the immediate vicinity of the present town of Childers was surveyed in 1882 into 50-acre farm blocks. There was no official town survey and Childers was developed following private subdivision at the railhead of the 1887 Isis railway line from Isis Junction. This was opened on 31 October 1887, and was intended principally to facilitate the transport of timber from the scrub.

The coming of the railway not only promoted the development of the town of Childers; it also provided the catalyst for the establishment of a sugar industry in the district in the late 1880s. At the opening of the railway to Childers, Robert Cran, owner of Maryborough's Yengarie mill, announced that he would erect a double crushing juice mill at Doolbi, to supply his mill at Yengarie. This was completed in 1890, with the juice being brought in railway tankers from the Isis. Further expansion of the sugar industry in the Isis was closely related to the activities of the Colonial Sugar Refining Company, which erected a central crushing mill in the district 1893–94, and began crushing in 1895. By 1895, at least three other mills had been established in the Isis, with another two under construction, and Childers had emerged as the flourishing centre of a substantial sugar-growing district: in the years between 1891 and 1900 the population grew from 91 to 4000. In 1903 the old Isis Divisional Board (1886) was abolished and Isis Shire proclaimed, with the new seat of municipal government moving from Howard to Childers.

Whilst Queensland in general was slow to recover from the depression of the early 1890s and the 1893 banking crisis, the growth of commerce in Childers was attractive to banking institutions contemplating expansion. CBCS Bank opened its first branch in Childers, in rented premises, in 1897. Together with the Bank of North Queensland, who opened its branch in 1895, they were the first to capitalise on the need for banking facilities in the newly emerging sugar town. The Commercial Banking Company of Sydney was formed by New South Wales interests in 1834; establishing its first Queensland branch at Maryborough by 1860. Within a few years it had constructed a substantial masonry building in Brisbane. It is not known from which premises the Childers branch operated initially, as the bank did not acquire the present site until April 1899. By March 1900, its new purpose-built banking chambers were close to completion. A photograph shows the new bank to have been single storeyed.

Architect James Percy Owen Cowlishaw was architect to the Commercial Banking Company and designed many of its buildings in Queensland. Born in 1867 he trained with architect John James Clark and in 1885 he joined the Public Works Department for a short time as a cadet, returning to Clark's office in 1887. By 1896 he was in practice on his own account. Remaining in practice until the 1920s, his other work is known to have included the Brisbane Gas Company Offices, Petrie Bight and the Lady O'Connell Wing at the Brisbane Children's Hospital.

In 1908 additions to the bank were carried out which involved raising the existing building and inserting a new storey at ground level with the banking chamber located on the ground floor and manager's residence on the upper level. Work was completed in January 1909. At the same time the bank purchased additional land to extend their frontage to the main street on the eastern side of the building. It is not known if Cowlishaw was the architect for the new work, though this is likely as he is believed to have still been the bank architect at this time.

In 1922 the bank purchased additional land to the west of the building adding to their earlier purchase. On 25 January 1943 the Childers branch of the CBC closed with business sent to Bundaberg; bank correspondence indicating that this was part of a wartime rationalisation of their services. The property was sold to Emma Makin in 1944 and operated briefly as a boarding house. In 1945, it was acquired by the local branch of the Returned Soldiers, Sailors and Airmen's Imperial League of Australia (RSSAILA). In 1966 the name changed to the Returned Services League of Australia (RSLA). The building remains in use as the branch club house.

== Description ==
The Childers RSLA club house is prominently located on the northern side of Childers main street, Churchill Street. It is a two story timber building with a hipped roof clad with corrugated iron. The facade detail is intact and features front verandahs to both levels supported on paired posts. These have slatted balustrading and decorative valancing to both storeys. The central entrance, which originally led to the banking chamber, is reached by steps to the verandah through a two storeyed porch. The verandah sides on the upper level have been enclosed by fibrous cement panels.

The ground floor is used as a bar and club rooms and the first floor is used as a club manager's residence. There is a modern single storey extension to the rear which accommodates function rooms. The ground floor contains rooms which were offices and the former banking chamber which has an adjoining masonry strong room retaining its steel door. There is a corner fireplace faced with marble in what was probably the manager's office. A similar fireplace is on the upper floor. This floor is reached by stairs on each side of the building. At least one is a nicely detailed timber staircase with turned balusters etc.

There are Honour Rolls on the ground floor for Isis District (World War I with additions for World War II), Doolbi and Horton (World War I with additions for World War II), and the CSR Childers Sugar Mill (World War I only).

== Heritage listing ==
Childers RSLA Club was listed on the Queensland Heritage Register on 21 October 1992 having satisfied the following criteria.

The place is important in demonstrating the evolution or pattern of Queensland's history.

The RSL Club building at Childers (formerly the Childers branch of the Commercial Banking Company of Sydney) demonstrates the growth and prosperity of the Isis as a sugar district in the early 20th century and the establishment of banking institutions to serve an expanding rural economy. It also demonstrates the growth of associations for returned service personnel in Australia following two major wars in which many Australians served and their wish to continue wartime comradeship.

The place is important in demonstrating the principal characteristics of a particular class of cultural places.

The former bank building demonstrates a common early practice in the design of provincial banks in which accommodation was provided on the premises for the manager and his family.

The place is important because of its aesthetic significance.

The RSLA Club is a dominant feature of Churchill Street and by its scale, form and detail makes an important contribution to the townscape of Childers.

The place has a strong or special association with a particular community or cultural group for social, cultural or spiritual reasons.

As an RSLA club house since the end of World War Two to the present, the building has an important association with returned service personnel in the district.

The place has a special association with the life or work of a particular person, group or organisation of importance in Queensland's history.

The building is also associated with the life and work of J P O Cowlishaw as Queensland architect for the Commercial Banking Company of Sydney and with the operation of that banking institution in Queensland.
