= Kerr's Building =

Heritage-listed shop in Queensland, Australia

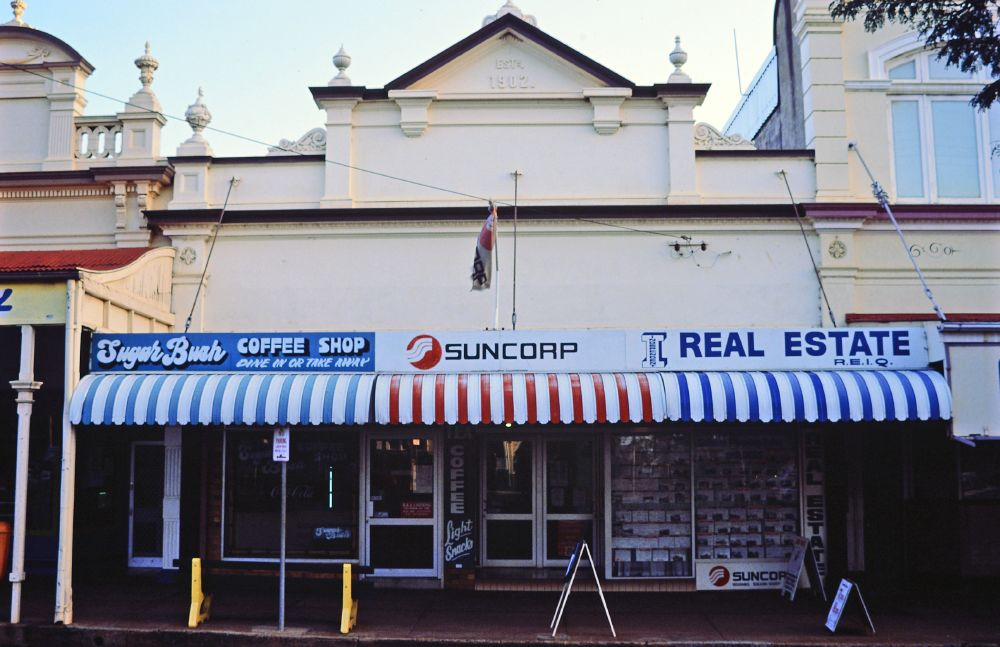
- Kerr's Building, 1992

- Location within Queensland Location within Australia
- 25.2368°S 152.2782°E
- Location: 84–86 Churchill Street, Childers, Bundaberg Region, Queensland, Australia

History
- Design period: 1900–1914 (early 20th century)
- Built: c. 1902

Queensland Heritage Register
- Official name: Kerr's Building, Crow & Kingston, Kingston and Kingston
- Type: state heritage (built)
- Designated: 25 June 1993
- Reference no.: 600627
- Significant period: 1900s (fabric); 1902–ongoing (historical retail use)
- Significant components: shed/s

Kerr's Building is a heritage-listed shop at 84–86 Churchill Street, Childers, Bundaberg Region, Queensland, Australia. It was built c. 1902. It is also known as Crow & Kingston and Kingston and Kingston. It was added to the Queensland Heritage Register on 25 June 1993.

== History ==
Kerr's Building was erected c. 1902 for Amelia Gertrude Overell, after a fire destroyed many of the shops along the southern side of Childers' main street.

The town of Childers grew up around a railway terminus opened in 1887 to facilitate timbergetting in the Isis Scrub. What became the main street was subdivided into small allotments in the 1890s. In 1893, Frederick John Charlton and Henry Jardine Gray sold 36 perches (910 m^{2}) to Ellen Delaney. In 1898, the property was sold to Overell. It is not known what shops existed on the site at this time although J. Delaney and later W. J. Overell and Sons operated draperies in Childers. In March 1902, a fire destroyed the timber shop on the site, which was replaced by the existing masonry building. After the fire the southern side of the street was resurveyed resulting in the blocks becoming doglegged in shape.

In 1907, merchants and importers, Crow and Kingston, acquired the site. After the winding up of the company of Crow and Kingston Ltd the site was purchased by cousins Jack and Bill Kingston, who operated the store as Kingston and Kingston, merchants and importers, drapers and grocers. The site remained in the Kingston family until 1974 when it was transferred to Marjorie Ann Kerr. In that year, the shop was extensively remodelled. This work included internal partitioning, boarding up of the skylight, installation of a suspended ceiling, re-concreting the floor, and the remodelling of the front awning.

In 1977, the property was transferred to the present owners, who operate a real estate office. Alterations were carried out c. 1990 to enable the letting of various parts of the building. Existing tenants include a coffee shop and a hairdresser.

== Description ==
Kerr's building fronts Churchill Street, the main street of Childers, to the north with rear access off Macrossan Street to the south. The single-storeyed masonry building is located within a cohesive group of predominantly 1900s shops with street awnings and decorative rendered facades. The building has a ribbed metal gabled roof with a central clerestory skylight to the east and west which has been boarded up.

The rendered street facade is surmounted by a parapet with a heavy cornice and raised central pediment, supporting three urns, with EST 1902 in relief. The two shop fronts have face brick with aluminium framed glazing, with a recessed entry to the west tenancy and central corridor. An aluminium awning is slung from the facade replacing an earlier ogee awning on timber posts.

Internally, the building has a central corridor with office space to the west, with a hairdresser behind, and a coffee shop to the east. Walls are rendered masonry or partition. There is a suspended ceiling throughout the building.

At the rear, is an attached timber shed which is partitioned with a tenancy to the west and a store room to the east. It has a timber floor which is at a higher level than the front building, and no ceiling.

== Heritage listing ==
Kerr's Building was listed on the Queensland Heritage Register on 25 June 1993 having satisfied the following criteria.

The place is important in demonstrating the evolution or pattern of Queensland's history.

Kerr's Building, Childers, erected c. 1902, is important in demonstrating the evolution of Queensland's history, illustrating the development of Childers in the early 20th century.

The place is important because of its aesthetic significance.

It is important in exhibiting a range of aesthetic characteristics valued by the Childers community, in particular its unity in form, scale and materials within the cohesive group of adjoining early 1900s shops; and its contribution to the streetscape of Churchill Street and to the Childers townscape.
