= Childers, Queensland =

Childers
- Town
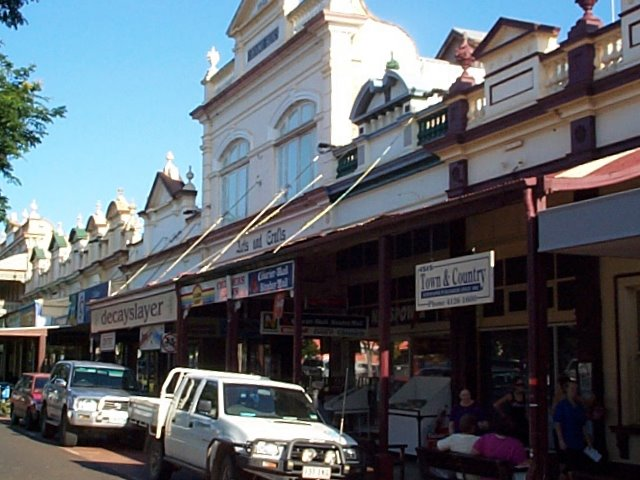
- Childers Main Street

- Interactive map of Childers
- Coordinates: 25.2363°S 152.2775°E
- Country: Australia
- State: Queensland
- LGA: Bundaberg Region
- Location: 51.2 km (31.8 mi) SSW of Bundaberg; 58.8 km (36.5 mi) W of Hervey Bay; 332 km (206 mi) NNW of Brisbane
- Established: 1885

Government
  - State electorate: Burnett
  - Federal division: Hinkler

Area
  - Total: 19.2 km^{2} (7.4 sq mi)
- Elevation: 109.0 m (357.6 ft)

Population
  - Total: 1,682 (2021 census)
  - Density: 87.60/km^{2} (226.9/sq mi)
- Time zone: UTC+10:00 (AEST)
- Postcode: 4660
- Mean max temp: 26.9 °C (80.4 °F)
- Mean min temp: 15.4 °C (59.7 °F)
- Annual rainfall: 1,056.8 mm (41.61 in)
Localities around Childers
North Isis	North Isis	North Isis
Apple Tree Creek	Childers	Doolbi
Kullogum	Kullogum	South Isis

Childers is a rural town and locality in the Bundaberg Region, Queensland, Australia. In the 2021 census, the locality of Childers had a population of 1,682 people.

== Geography ==
Childers is in the Wide Bay–Burnett region of Queensland, Australia, situated on the Bruce Highway and lies 325 kilometres (202 mi) north of the state capital Brisbane and 52 kilometres (32 mi) south-west of Bundaberg. The Isis Highway runs south from the Bruce Highway in Childers.

== History ==
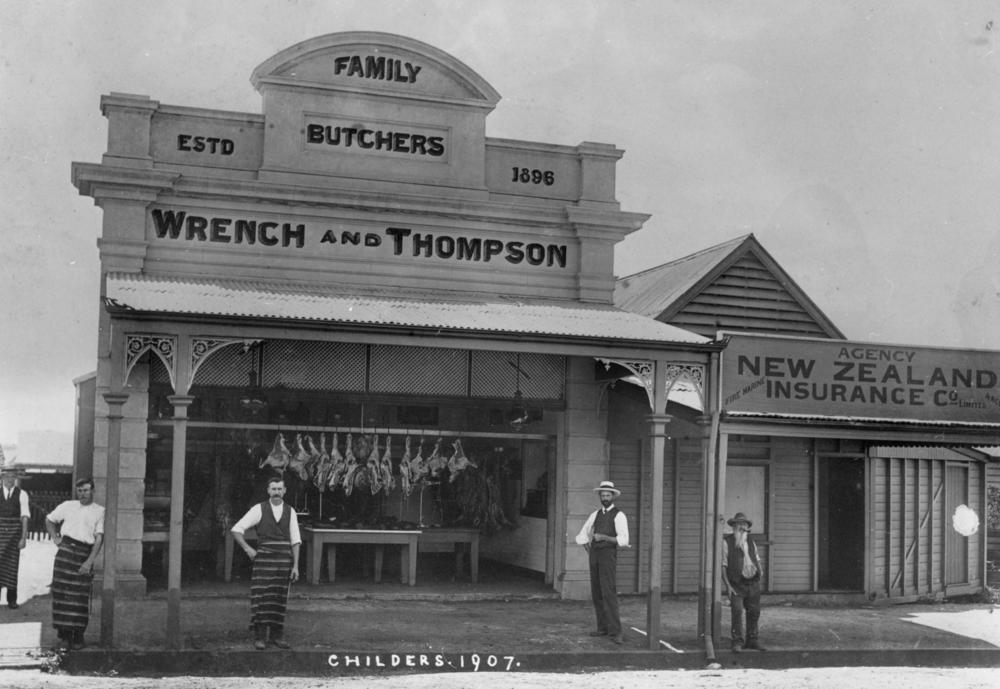
Wrench and Thompson butchers shop in Childers, 1907

The Childers area is traditionally inhabited by the Dundabarra/burra group (red soil tribe) who are large collective group of the Kabi Kabi nations in the northernmost area of the Wide Bay Burnett. Their descendants still live in the region.

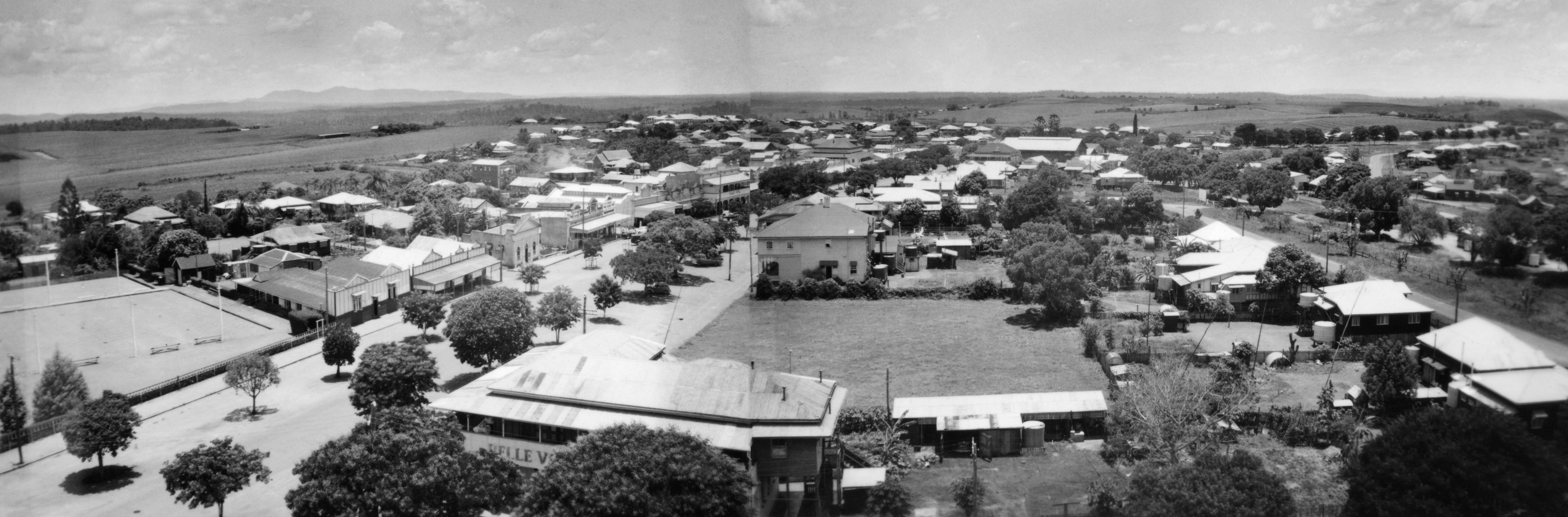
Panorama of Childers, ca. 1956

Europeans first arrived in the area in the 1850s. Pastoralists established properties soon after to raise cattle on the fertile lands. Back then, sugar was (as it is now) the key crop grown in the Isis.

The town was established in 1885. The Isis railway line to Childers opened in 1887 and was pivotal in the early development of the area. Childers Post Office opened on 14 November 1887. The town is reportedly named after Hugh Childers, British statesman, who was the Auditor-General of Victoria in the 1850s.

Circa 1888–1889, an Anglican church was erected in Childers. The present Christ Church Anglican was opened and dedicated on 9 May 1901.

The Childers Uniting Church was originally constructed as the Methodist Church in Horton in 1886. Due to the decline of the Horton township the church was subsequently moved to Childers. It became the Childers Uniting Church in June 1977 following the amalgamation of the Methodist Church into the Uniting Church in Australia in 1977.

Childers Provisional School opened on 28 January 1889. In 1891, it became Childers State School. A secondary department was added in January 1913 and operated as Childers State High School, until Isis District State High School was established in 1961. A pre-school was added in 1976.

Isis Central Mill Provisional School opened on 23 January 1899. On 1 January 1909, it became Isis Central Mill State School. It closed on 11 December 1987.

The first Childers Show was held in August 1903. It was officially opened by the Queensland Governor Sir Herbert Chermside.

St Joseph's Catholic School was established on 24 January 1926 by the Sisters of St Joseph of the Sacred Heart.

On 28 September 1941, Archbishop James Duhig laid the foundation stone for the Sacred Heart Catholic Church.

Isis District State High School commenced operation on 23 January 1961. It was formerly Childers State High School, a secondary department of the Childers State School.

The foundation stone of Grace Lutheran Church was laid by Pastor K Scholz on 16 April 1961.

The town made international headlines in June 2000, when an arsonist set fire to the Palace Backpackers Hostel, claiming the lives of 15 tourists. The Palace Building reopened in 2002, and includes a memorial to those lost in the blaze, a Regional Art Gallery and an Information Centre.

The Childers Library opened in 2000 with a major refurbishment in 2014.

== Demographics ==
In the 2016 census, the locality of Childers had a population of 1,584 people. 80.1% of people were born in Australia and 87.0% of people spoke only English at home. The most common responses for religion were No Religion 23.0%, Anglican 21.2% and Catholic 17.8%.

In the 2021 census, the locality of Childers had a population of 1,682 people.

== Heritage listings ==
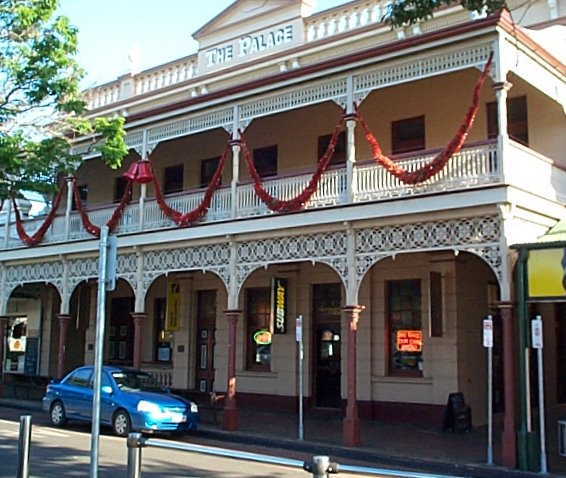
The rebuilt Palace Hotel

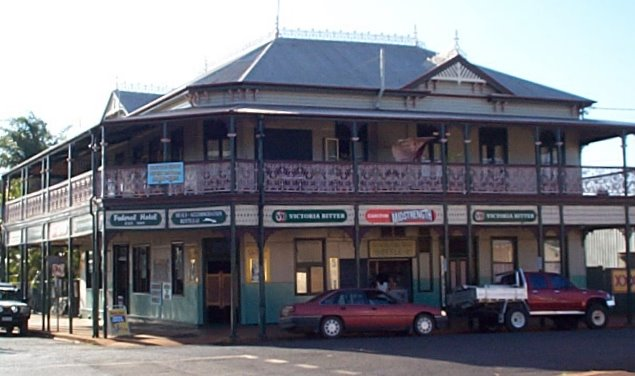
Federal Hotel

Childers has a number of heritage-listed sites, including:

- Childers Post Office, Bruce Highway
- Childers Court House, Churchill Street
- Isis District War Memorial and Shire Council Chambers, 45 Churchill Street
- Queensland National Bank, 50 Churchill Street
- Shops and Cafe, 54–58 Churchill Street
- Childers RSL Club, 55 Churchill Street
- Hotel Childers, 59 Churchill Street
- Chemist, 60 Churchill Street
- National Australia Bank, 61 Churchill Street
- Ellwood & Co Drapery, 62 Churchill Street
- Pizzey Memorial Clock, 63 Churchill Street
- Jeffery's Building, 66–70 Churchill Street
- Childers Ambulance Station, 69 Churchill Street
- Federal Hotel, 71 Churchill Street
- Palace Hotel, 72 Churchill Street
- Hardware Store, 74–78 Churchill Street
- Paragon Theatre, 75 Churchill Street
- Lloyd's Barber Shop, 80 Churchill Street
- Bakery, 82 Churchill Street
- Kerr's Building, 84–86 Churchill Street
- Childers Pharmaceutical Museum, 88–90 Churchill Street
- Dittmer's Store, 92–94 Churchill Street
- Coronation Building, 102–108 Churchill Street
- Grand Hotel, Childers, 106–110 Churchill Street
- Christ Church, Macrossan Street
- Isis Masonic Lodge, 18 Macrossan Street
- Old Butcher's Shop, 6 North Street

== Economy ==
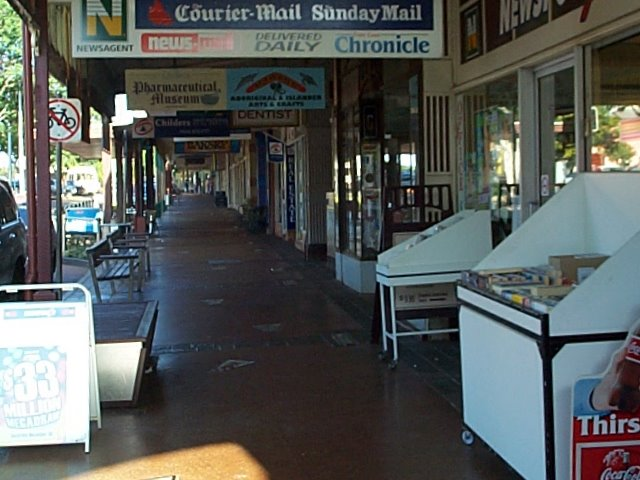
Childers local businesses

The local tourism organisation "Stay in Childers" is a not for profit incorporated association made up of local businesses.

== Education ==
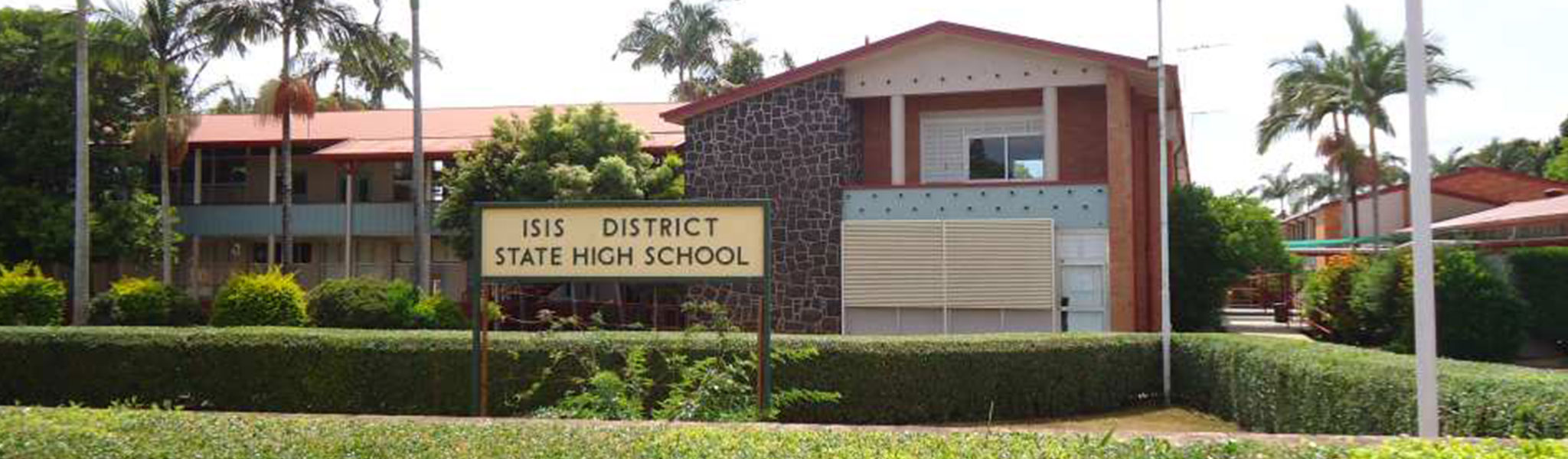
Isis District State High School, 2024.

Childers State School is a government primary (Early Childhood to Year 6) school for boys and girls at Mungomery Street (25.2311°S 152.2803°E). In 2017, the school had an enrolment of 308 students with 24 teachers (22 full-time equivalent) and 20 non-teaching staff (14 full-time equivalent). It includes a special education program.

St Joseph's School is a Catholic primary (Prep–6) school for boys and girls at 40 Churchill Street (25.2359°S 152.2811°E). In 2017, the school had an enrolment of 75 students with 8 teachers (7 full-time equivalent) and 9 non-teaching staff (5 full-time equivalent).

Isis District State High School is a government secondary (7–12) school for boys and girls at 3 Ridgway Street (25.2331°S 152.2739°E). In 2017, the school had an enrolment of 504 students with 48 teachers (46 full-time equivalent) and 33 non-teaching staff (22 full-time equivalent). It includes a special education program.

== Amenities ==
Childers has a library, an art gallery (Childers Art Space), and a visitor information Centre. Cultural entertainment takes place at the Isis Cultural Centre at 49 Churchill Street.

Bundaberg Regional Libraries operate a public library at 49 Churchill Street.

The Childers branch of the Queensland Country Women's Association meets at 1 Crescent Street.

Christ Church Anglican Church is at 11 Mcilwraith Street. It is within the Anglican Archdiocese of Brisbane.

Sacred Heart Catholic Church is at 40 Churchill Street. It is within the Roman Catholic Archdiocese of Brisbane.

Childers Uniting Church is at 36 Macrossan Street (25.2374°S 152.2757°E). It is part of the Uniting Church in Australia.

Grace Lutheran Church is at 226 Churchill Street. It is part of the Lutheran Church of Australia.

The Childers Apostolic Church of Queensland is at 13 Nelson Street. It is part of the Apostolic Church of Queensland.

Childers Wesleyan Methodist Church is at 6 Broadhurst Street (25.2362°S 152.2743°E). It is part of the Wesleyan Methodist Church of Australia.

Childers Gospel Chapel is at 34 Churchill Street. It is part of the Christian Community Churches of Australia.

== Events ==
Childers Show is a one-day agricultural show. Historically, it was held in early August, but is now hosted in late May or early June.

Childers holds a Multicultural Festival once a year on the final weekend in July.

== Attractions ==
Noakes Lookout is off Rankin Road (25.2211°S 152.2845°E). At 128 metres (420 ft) above sea level, it is one of the highest points in the area, providing 360 degree panoramic views. However, as at 2013, regrowth of bushland surrounding the lookout has obscured the views and, as the lookout is on private land, there is no guaranteed right of access to the public.
