= Anton Hettrich =

Anton Hettrich (1860–1946) was a German-born architect in Queensland, Australia. A number of his buildings are now heritage-listed.

Hettrich emigrated to Queensland from Germany in 1870 when he set up in practice as an architect in Bundaberg. He married Karen Thomsen in Brisbane in 1892 and they had one daughter and one son. Soon after his arrival he won design competitions for the Bundaberg Town Hall and the Bundaberg School of Arts. He also designed the Primitive Methodist Church and Sacred Heart Roman Catholic Church in Childers. Frederick Faircloth, who later designed many buildings in Childers, was his pupil. He died at Dunwich Benevolent Asylum on 4 February 1946 of senility and his body was cremated.

== Significant works ==
- School of Arts, Bundaberg (1888)
- Grand Hotel, Childers (1899)
