= Palace Hotel, Childers =

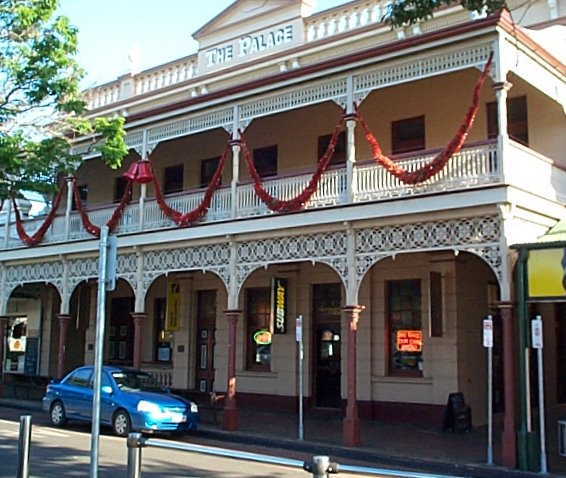
- The Palace rebuilt after the 2000 fire

- Location within Queensland Location within Australia
- 25.2368°S 152.2786°E
- Location: 72 Churchill Street, Childers, Bundaberg Region, Queensland, Australia

Queensland Heritage Register
- Official name: Palace Hotel
- Type: state heritage (built)
- Designated: 21 October 1992
- Reference no.: 600623
- Significant period: 1900s

The Palace Hotel is a heritage-listed former hotel at 72 Churchill Street, Childers, Bundaberg Region, Queensland, Australia. It is also known as the Palace Backpackers Hostel and the Palace Backpackers Memorial. It was added to the Queensland Heritage Register on 21 October 1992. It was the site of a deliberately-lit fire that killed 15 backpackers in 2000.

== History ==
The Palace Hotel was erected c. 1902 for Malcolm Redmond after a fire destroyed many of the buildings along the southern side of Childers' main street. The new masonry building replaced an earlier two storeyed timber hotel. The new hotel comprised public rooms on the ground floor with accommodation on the upper floor; the detached kitchen was located to the rear, with modest staff accommodation above. A large brick room opposite the kitchen may have operated as a storeroom at this time. In 1932, the hotel was acquired by Corser and Co Ltd, and again was leased. A new second storeyed accommodation wing at the rear to the building may have been added at this time. The Palace Hotel remained as an operating hotel until the 1980s, after which it was converted into a backpackers' hostel.

=== Hostel fire ===
On 23 June 2000, a fire was deliberately started at the hostel and 15 backpackers died.

The Palace Hotel was rebuilt in its original early 1900s style. Queensland artist Sam Di Mauro made a 7.7-metre (25 ft) long glass memorial wall that was set into the new building. Sydney artist Josonia Palaitis created a painting depicting all those who died based on photographs.

== Description ==
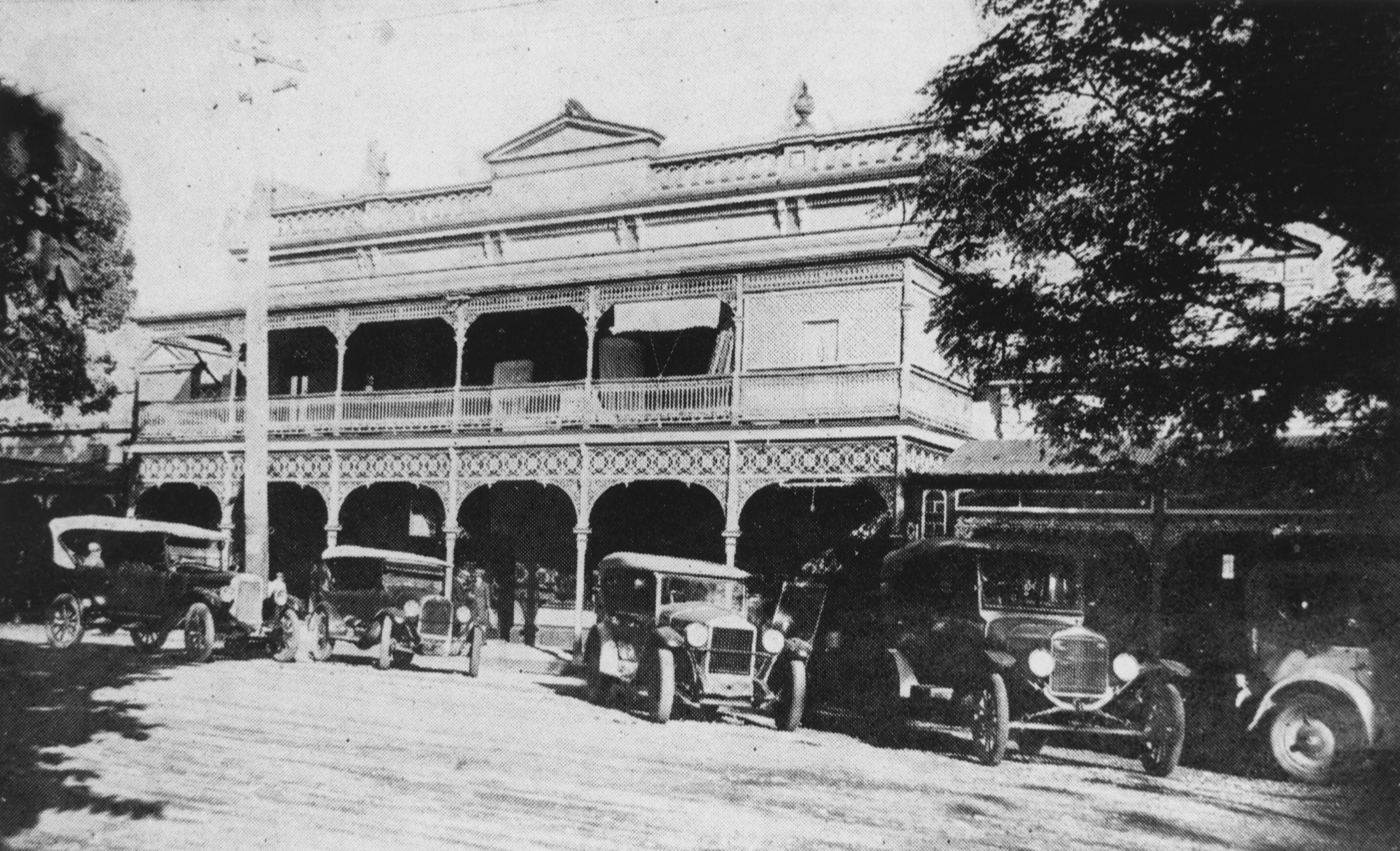
Palace Hotel, circa 1928

The Palace Hotel is a two-storeyed rendered masonry and timber building with corrugated iron roofs. It comprises a rectangular wing with verandahs fronting Churchill St to the north (c. 1902), linked by a narrow covered courtyard to a parallel wing to the south (c. 1902 and c. 1930s). Externally the building is complementary in materials, scale and form to other commercial buildings on Churchill St. At the same time, it rises above the predominantly single-storeyed shops on Churchill St, and is prominent in the townscape.

Prior to the 2000 fire, the northern wing had ground floor public rooms, with accommodation rooms above. The south wing comprised two adjoining buildings; a service building to the west containing a kitchen to the ground floor and former staff accommodation upstairs, linked by a corridor to a ground floor function room and upstairs hotel accommodation.

The Bundaberg Regional Council now operates a tourist information centre on the ground floor and the Palace Backpackers Memorial is on the upper floor.

== Heritage listing ==
The Palace Hotel was listed on the Queensland Heritage Register on 21 October 1992 having satisfied the following criteria.

The place is important in demonstrating the evolution or pattern of Queensland's history.

The Palace Hotel is important in demonstrating the evolution of Queensland's history, in particular it represents evidence of the development of Childers in the early twentieth century, including the rebuilding of the south side of the main street in the early 1900s; and the form, detailing, additions to, and outbuildings of, the hotel are evidence of the evolution of a country town hotel. The hotel is important in demonstrating the principal characteristics of an early twentieth century country town hotel with its ground floor public rooms, upstairs modest accommodation, service wing, and significant contribution to a country town streetscape. It is important in exhibiting a range of aesthetic characteristics valued by the community, in particular the fine interiors, including the ground floor public rooms, and the building's significant contribution in form, scale, materials, and details to the architecturally coherent and picturesque Churchill Street streetscape and townscape.
