= Frederic Herbert Faircloth =

Frederic Herbert (Herb) Faircloth (1870–1925) was an architect in Bundaberg, Queensland, Australia. Many of his buildings are now heritage-listed.

== Early life ==
Frederic Herbert Faircloth was born in Maryborough, Queensland on 16 June 1870, the son of George Faircloth, a police magistrate, and his wife Maria Arkley (nee Dun).

== Architectural career ==
Faircloth was a pupil of German-trained Bundaberg architect Anton Hettrich. Faircloth set up his own practice in Bundaberg in 1893 and was very successful, eventually being responsible for the design of almost every major building there. He was also to have a major effect on the appearance and character of Childers where he was engaged to design replacement buildings after much of the main street was destroyed by fire in 1902.

== Later life ==
Herb Faircloth died on 8 July 1925 in Bundaberg General Hospital. He was supervising the construction of new Roman Catholic and Anglican churches in Bundaberg at the time of his death. He was buried in Bundaberg General Cemetery.

== Significant works ==
Faircloth's significant works include:

- Bundaberg War Memorial
- Barambah Homestead
- Queensland National Bank, Maryborough
- St Patrick's Catholic Church, Mount Perry
