= Isis, Queensland =

Isis, Queensland may refer to:

- Isis Central, a town in the Bundaberg Region
- North Isis, Queensland, locality in the Bundaberg Region
- South Isis, Queensland, locality in the Bundaberg Region
- Shire of Isis, former local government area
