= Childers Court House =

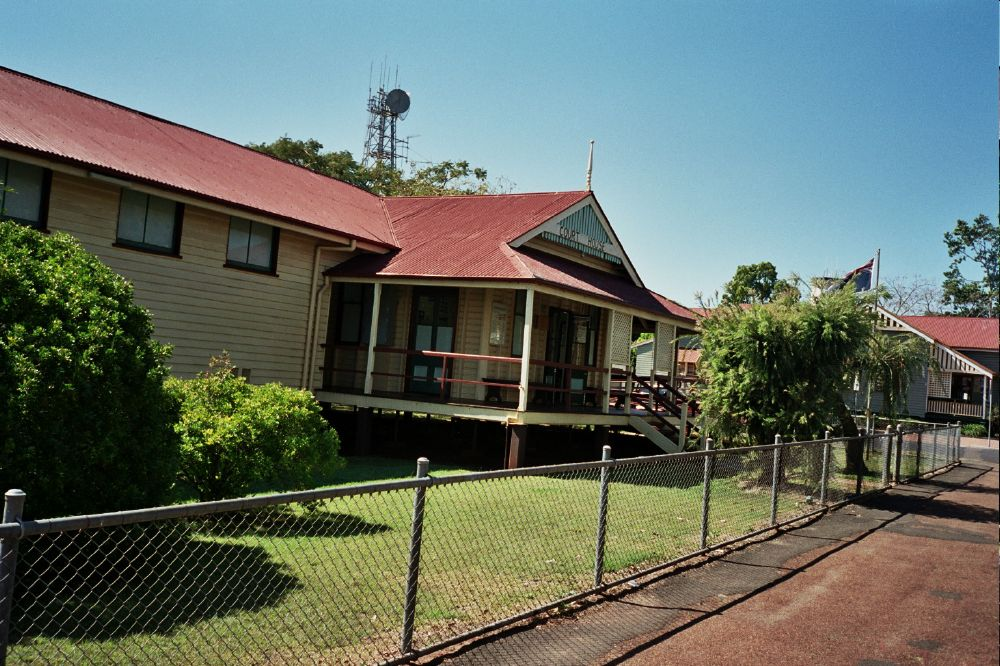
- Childers Court House, 2005

- Location within Queensland Location within Australia
- 25.2361°S 152.2778°E
- Location: Churchill Street, Childers, Bundaberg Region, Queensland, Australia

History
- Design period: 1870s–1890s (late 19th century)
- Built: 1897–1900

Site notes
- Architect: Queensland Colonial Architect's Office
- Architectural style: Classicism

Queensland Heritage Register
- Official name: Childers Court House
- Type: state heritage (built)
- Designated: 21 October 1992
- Reference no.: 600620
- Significant period: 1890s–1900s (historical); 1897–1900s (fabric); 1897–ongoing (social)
- Significant components: office/s, court house
- Builders: William Cristine Horton and Louis Bouttell

Childers Court House is a heritage-listed courthouse at Churchill Street, Childers, Bundaberg Region, Queensland, Australia. It was designed by Queensland Colonial Architect's Office and built in 1897 by William Cristine Horton and Louis Bouttell. It was added to the Queensland Heritage Register on 21 October 1992.

== History ==
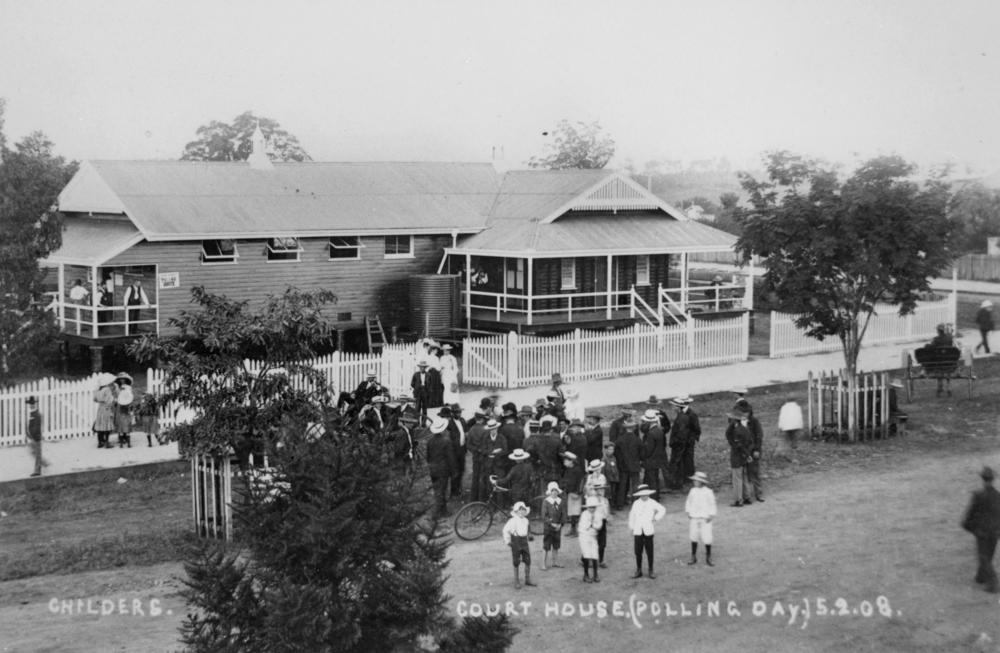
Childers Court House on polling day, 5 February 1908

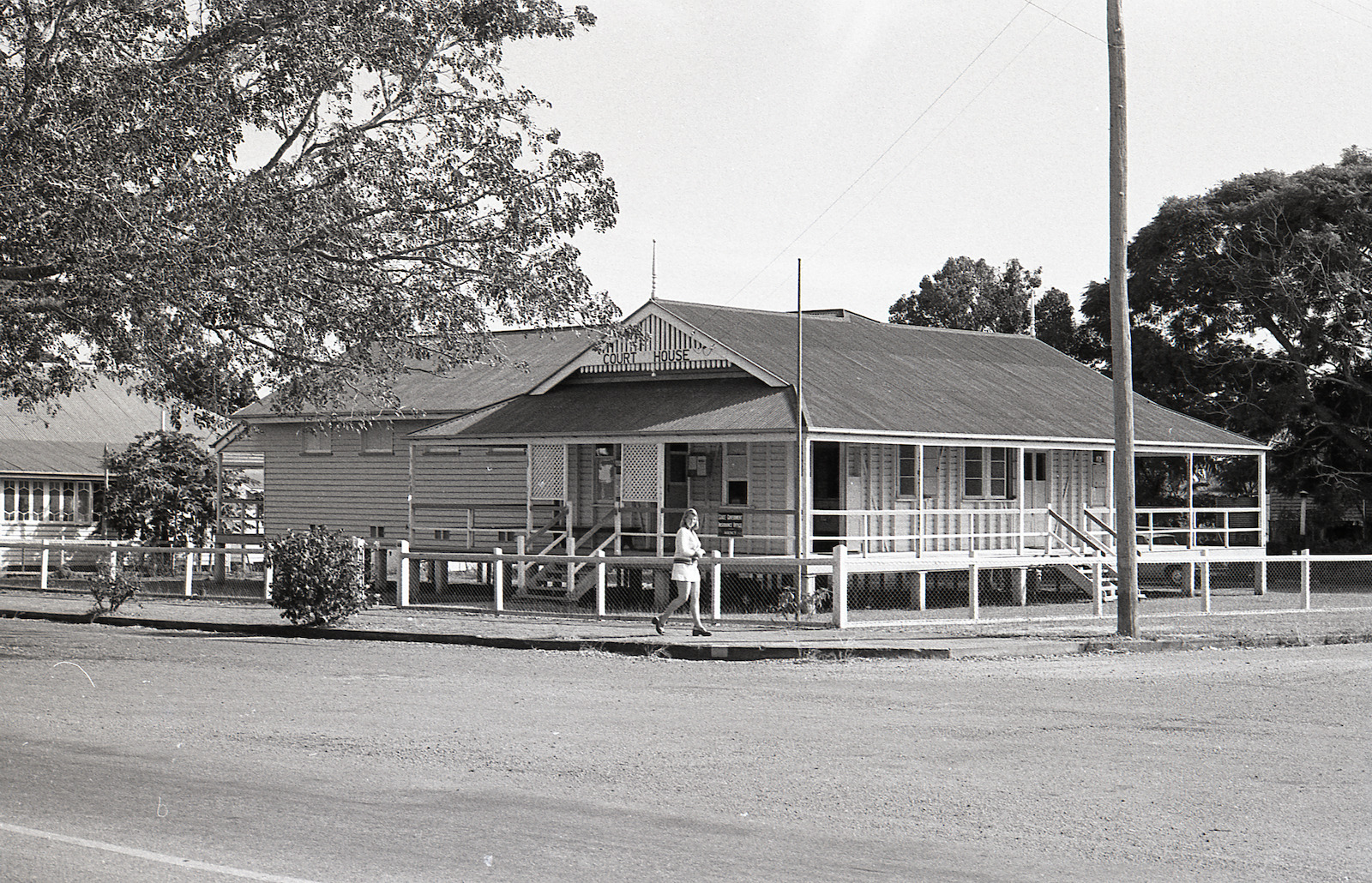
Court House, Childers, Queensland, 1975

The Childers Court House is a single-story timber building erected in 1897; in 1900 a new court room was added to form a T-shaped building. It is one of a number of public buildings (including government and banking) which characterise the northern side of Childers' main street and was the first purpose-built courthouse erected in the newly emerging sugar town.

Following logging of the dense Isis Scrub in the 1870s, Childers, in the heart of the scrub, was promoted in the 1880s by Maryborough interests, as an agricultural district. The land in the immediate vicinity of the present town of Childers was surveyed in 1882 into 50-acre (20 ha) farm blocks. There was no official town survey; Childers developed following the private subdivision of portions 870 and 871, at the railhead of the 1887 Isis railway line from Isis Junction on the North Coast railway line. This was opened on 31 October 1887, and was intended principally to facilitate the transport of timber from the scrub.

The coming of the railway not only promoted the development of the town of Childers; it also proved the catalyst for the establishment of a sugar industry in the district in the late 1880s. At the opening of the railway to Childers, Robert Cran, owner of Maryborough's Yengarie mill, announced that he would erect a double crushing juice mill at Doolbi, to supply his mill at Yengarie. This was completed in 1890, with the juice being brought in railway tankers from the Isis. Further expansion of the sugar industry in the Isis was closely related to the activities of the Colonial Sugar Refining Company, which erected a central crushing mill in the district 1893–94, and began crushing in 1895. By 1895, at least three other mills had been established in the Isis, with another two under construction, and Childers had emerged as the flourishing centre of a substantial sugar-growing district: in the years between 1891 and 1900 the population grew from 91 to 4000. In 1903 the old Isis Divisional Board (1886) was abolished and Isis Shire proclaimed, with the new seat of municipal government moving from Howard to Childers.

Prior to the erection of the Court House court sittings were held in the former Land Commissioner's office at the Childers Post Office. In 1896 the Secretary of the Isis Progress Association wrote to the Home Secretary urgently requesting the building of a court house in Childers as larger premises are needed for the amount of court business. According to the Committee there were numberless reasons to justify the building of a court house but the most important of which was to provide an area for people to wait inside rather than out on the street.

In March 1897 tenders for the erection of a new court house at Childers were called; the tender of William Cristine Horton and Louis Bouttell for £306/7/0 being accepted in August. A drawing stamped 25 January 1897 prepared by the Government Architect's Office shows a single story timber building comprising public waiting area, court room, and an office to the rear surrounded by verandahs on all four sides. Plans for the court room furniture were also included. The Childers Court House is an example of one of a number of court house types developed by the Government Architect for use throughout country Queensland. The use of these types addressed the need for economy but also resulted in a high quality of public building even on this modest scale.

By November the building was almost complete with Inspector of Works Hannington advising that it will be necessary, on account of the site having been changed, to construct a dividing fence to separate the Court House ground from that of the Station Master's house and recommending shifting the front line of split paling fence, and erecting a new front fence of sawn battens, and supplying a bridge over water table. The specification included reference to the purpose built furniture for the court room and the building was to be coloured in a light stone tint and picked out in darker shades as directed.

Soon after, in 1900, additions were made to accommodate the District Court sittings to be held in Childers (in addition to the Police Court work already held). The Clerk of Petty Sessions reported the need for two additional rooms (one for the Police Magistrate and Judge and another for the Jury to retire to). A third room would be convenient for witnesses waiting to give evidence especially to female witnesses who are sometimes subject to unpleasant insinuations cast at them when waiting about the Court. Plans prepared by the Government Architect show the addition of a wing to the western side of the existing building; with the earlier building to be remodelled to accommodate a jury room, the Police Magistrate and Judge's room, and Crown Prosecution Service office. The new wing was to contain the new court room. The plans provided for high set windows (presumably to facilitate the privacy of the court) and lowset ventilating grills with existing court room furniture to be reused in the new room. Public access was from a verandah at the western end; official access was provided from the 1897 building (housing the court offices). Tenders for the additions were called in May; George Upham's tender of £256/6/0 to be completed in three months was accepted.

It is the 1900 reconfiguration of the court house which survives today with the 1900 court room still in use as the Magistrate's Court and the 1897 building used for associated administration. Recent works include the insertion of air-conditioning services and the addition of a ramp entry for disabled access (1995). Other changes include the removal of roof ventilators and a decorative white picket fence (shown in a 1908 photo; replaced by a chain wire fence).

As with other country court houses across the state, the Childers Court House is more than its name implies. Since Queensland separated from New South Wales in 1859, court houses have been an important symbol of the ongoing settlement of the colony (later the state) as well as in a practical sense a centre for government services. Thus, in addition to its court functions, the Childers Court House (which celebrated its centenary in 1997) is also an administrative centre providing an agency for a number of other state government departments and/or services to the people of the Isis region.

== Description ==
The Childers Court House is located in the centre of Childers at the corner of Churchill Street (the main street) and Crescent Street. It forms part of a government precinct which includes the nearby Post Office and Childers Ambulance Station).

The earliest 1897 section of the Childers Court House is rectangular in plan form with its long axis set perpendicular to the street. The 1900 addition is attached to this running to the west which also has a rectangular plan form.

The building is a single storeyed and constructed in timber and set on timber stumps and is clad in a combination of weatherboard at the exposed walls and exposed frame in the sheltered areas under the timber verandah. The verandah, which has simple double horizontal rails as the balustrade, surrounds the original section of the building. There is also a verandah on the west end of the addition. There is an access ramp for people with disability attached to the eastern verandah.

The roof forms are gabled and clad in corrugated colorbond. The gables are infilled with vertical boarding which has a scalloped bottom edge and supported at the lower end by an exposed collar tie. The apex of the gable is surmounted by a timber finial.

French doors open onto the verandah in the original section. The windows in this area are double hung and are constructed as part of the exposed frame system. The windows on the addition, which functions as a Court Room, are narrow and at high level down the north and south elevations. These elevations also exhibit ventilation grill that were a part of the original design. Both sections of the building are now air-conditioned with a split refrigerated system.

Both sections of the building are clad internally with tongue and grooved boarding. The ceilings which are in the same material follow the rafter line to the bottom of the collar ties where they become flat. The 1897 building contains offices; the Court Room retains elements of early furniture that include the Judges bench, dock, reporters benches and clerks tables. The interior of the Court Room also displays the trade certificate of the carpenter.

== Heritage listing ==
Childers Court House was listed on the Queensland Heritage Register on 21 October 1992 having satisfied the following criteria.

The place is important in demonstrating the evolution or pattern of Queensland's history.

The Childers Court House is important in illustrating the pattern of Queensland history being erected during a period of unprecedented growth in the Isis, when Childers was emerging as the flourishing centre of a substantial sugar-growing district.

Erected in 1897 (with major additions 1900), the Court House has served the Isis community for over a century. In common with other country court houses it is associated not only with the administration of justice but also, from the earliest European settlement, as an administrative centre for a range of government services. The building of such infrastructure was a tangible expression of government's recognition and encouragement of the growth of the Isis; the Court House became one of a number of public buildings which characterise the north side of Childers main street.

The place is important in demonstrating the principal characteristics of a particular class of cultural places.

The Childers Court House (including court room furniture) is a fine and intact example of a timber country court house.

The place is important because of its aesthetic significance.

The building, particularly due to its use of scale, form and materials, contributes to the heritage significance of the Churchill Street streetscape and Childers townscape.

The place has a strong or special association with a particular community or cultural group for social, cultural or spiritual reasons.

Erected in 1897 (major additions 1900), the Court House has served the Isis community for over a century. In common with other country court houses it is associated not only with the administration of justice but also, from the earliest European settlement, as an administrative centre for a range of government services.

The place has a special association with the life or work of a particular person, group or organisation of importance in Queensland's history.

It has a special association with the work of the Government Architect's Office which developed a number of court house types which sought to respond to matters both economic and climatic, as well as providing a high quality of public building even on this modest scale.
