= Childers Ambulance Station =

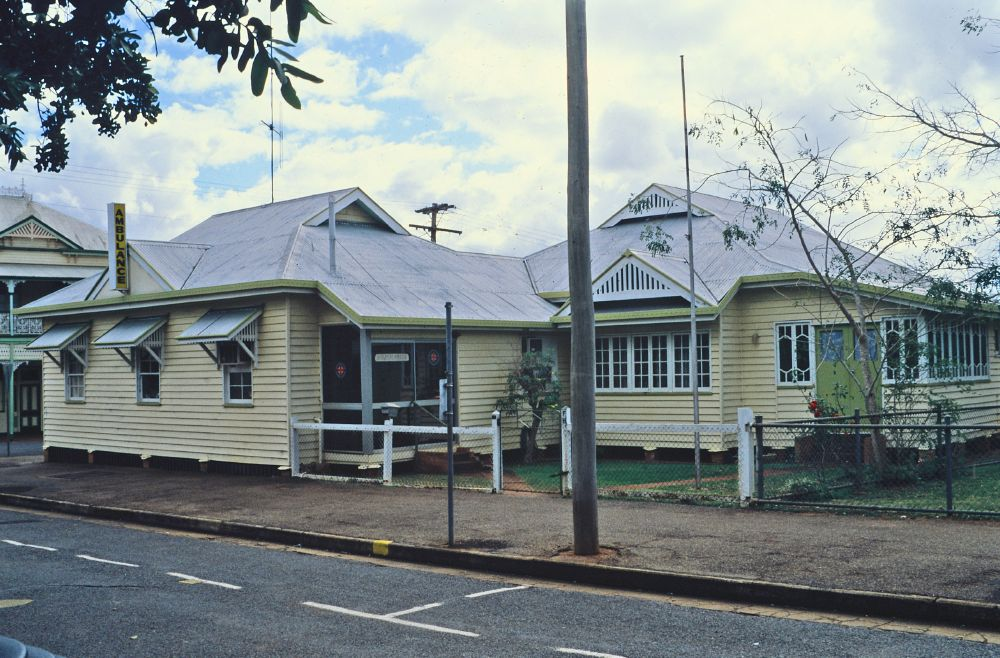
- Former Childers Ambulance Station, 1998

- Location within Queensland Location within Australia
- 25.2361°S 152.2775°E
- Location: 69 Churchill Street, Childers, Bundaberg Region, Queensland, Australia

History
- Design period: 1919–1930s (interwar period)
- Built: 1924

Site notes
- Architect: Leonard Kempster

Queensland Heritage Register
- Official name: Childers QATB (former), Childers Ambulance Centre, Isis District Centre QATB
- Type: state heritage (built)
- Designated: 21 October 1992
- Reference no.: 600621
- Significant period: 1924 (fabric); 1920s–1990s (historical)
- Significant components: residential accommodation – superintendent's house/quarters, ambulance bay
- Builders: Queensland Department of Public Works

Childers Ambulance Station is a heritage-listed former ambulance station at 69 Churchill Street, Childers, Bundaberg Region, Queensland, Australia. It was designed by Leonard Kempster and built in 1924 by Queensland Department of Public Works. It is also known as Childers QATB and Isis District Centre QATB. It was added to the Queensland Heritage Register on 21 October 1992.

== History ==
The former ambulance station building is situated on a prominent corner in the main street of Childers. It was erected in 1924 to plans prepared by Leonard Kempster of the Department of Public Works and is a single storey timber building comprising an ambulance station and superintendent's residence.

The Queensland Ambulance Transport Brigade (QATB) began in Brisbane in 1892. It was formed by Seymour Warrian of the Army Medical Corps after seeing an accident victim suffer considerable aggravation of their injuries through inexpert transport to hospital. The brigade aimed to provide first aid and skilled transport to hospital for the sick and injured. In the first years the brigade was wholly funded by subscription, but met such an important need that from 1895 they were subsidised by the government, both directly and by involving the Department of Works in the construction of ambulance buildings. In the late 1890s and 1900s they expanded into regional centres. By 1921, a specific layout for ambulance buildings had been formalised into policy. This incorporated a space for vehicles with easy street access, a casualty room, meeting room and sleeping room for ambulance bearers on a ground floor level and residential quarters for the superintendent above. The Childers ambulance station differs from this scheme in that the rooms provided are the same but the residence is set on ground level slightly behind the station, rather than above it. This may have been so that the station complemented the court house complex and post office nearby.

By the 1920s Childers was the centre of a thriving sugar-growing and -processing district in the Isis. The area was opened up by logging in the 1870s, followed by development as an agricultural area. The land in the immediate vicinity of the present town of Childers was surveyed in 1882 into 50-acre (20 ha) farm blocks. There was no official town survey, Childers being developed by private subdivision at the railhead of the 1887 Isis railway line from Isis Junction railway station on the North Coast railway line. This was opened on 31 October 1887, and was intended principally to facilitate the transport of timber from the scrub.

The coming of the railway not only promoted the development of the town of Childers; it also proved the catalyst for the establishment of a sugar industry in the district in the late 1880s. At the opening of the railway to Childers, Robert Cran, owner of Maryborough's Yengarie mill, announced that he would erect a double crushing juice mill at Doolbi, to supply his mill at Yengarie. This was completed in 1890, with the juice being brought in railway tankers from the Isis. Further expansion of the sugar industry in the Isis was closely related to the activities of the Colonial Sugar Refining Company, which erected a central crushing mill in the district 1893–94, and began crushing in 1895. By 1895, at least three other mills had been established in the Isis, with another two under construction, and Childers had emerged as the flourishing centre of a substantial sugar-growing district: in the years between 1891 and 1900 the population grew from 91 to 4000. In 1903 the old Isis Divisional Board (1886) was abolished and Isis Shire proclaimed, with the new seat of municipal government moving from Howard to Childers.

The first official hospital in Childers was opened in 1899 and members of the hospital committee acted as ambulance bearers when needed. In 1920, a Mr James Rushton purchased a garage, converted his Model T Ford and began a local ambulance service. He was instrumental in forming a QATB committee in Childers. The 1920s were a period in which public awareness of health issues grew, possibly triggered by the deadly influenza epidemics of the 1919–1920 period. The present hospital in Childers was built in 1929, but an ambulance station was constructed earlier in 1924.

The Department of Works plans show the ambulance station as comprising a plant room (for the ambulance and equipment), casualty room, bearers' room, board room and superintendent's room. The building was lowset to allow vehicular access from Randall Street. Pedestrian access was via a porch with seating accommodation from Churchill Street. Set to one side and to the rear of the station was the superintendent's residence linked to the station through the casualty room. Changes have been minor and include an addition to the northern elevation of the plant room (a possibility indicated in the original plans), replacement of the garage doors with a roller door and the replacement of the timber picket fence with a wire fence.

In 1986 the QATB came under the jurisdiction of the Minister for Police and Emergency Services. Following plans for the reorganisation of the service, the brigade was disbanded on 30 June 1991 and the Queensland Ambulance Transport Service was established as part of the Bureau of Emergency Services. QAS constructed a new station on adjoining land in 1999 and offered the old station up for sale. It is now the Childers Neighbourhood Centre.

== Description ==
The former QATB building is located on the northern side of Childers main street, Churchill Street, on the corner of Randall Street. It forms part of a government precinct with the Childers Court House located next door and Childers Post Office in the next block.

The building is in fact two connected low-set single storey buildings, one housing the residence and the other the station and offices. Both buildings have gambrel roofs. The ambulance station is on the corner and at the street alignment, with the residence set to one side and to the rear. The station has a roller door opening to McIlwraith Street and on the opposite side of the building the roof extends over an entrance porch. It is plain in detail and is lit by sash windows shaded by sunhoods. A small gable facing Churchill Street holds a vertical sign with the word "Ambulance".

The residence has a gabled roof which breaks pitch to extend over a sleeping verandah on the eastern side. There is projecting front gable with triple casement windows and the main entrance to the east of this has been widened and is now reached by a ramp. A row of narrow decorative casements, set with pink and green glass, extends along the front wall bedside the entrance and down the eastern side of the house along what was the entrance and sleeping verandah. A subsidiary skillion roof at the rear covers a laundry section.

== Heritage listing ==
The former Childers Ambulance Station was listed on the Queensland Heritage Register on 21 October 1992 having satisfied the following criteria.

The place is important in demonstrating the evolution or pattern of Queensland's history.

The building in Childers is important in illustrating the development of ambulance services in the state, the importance of Childers as a flourishing centre of the Isis, a substantial sugar-growing district, and the support provided by government to both the QATB and expanding agricultural districts.

The place is important in demonstrating the principal characteristics of a particular class of cultural places.

It is important as an example of an Interwar ambulance station and residence and demonstrates the quality of design, construction and detail achieved by the Public Works Department during this period.

The place is important because of its aesthetic significance.

The former ambulance station, due to its prominent position in the main street of Childers and its use of scale, form and materials, makes a major contribution to the townscape.

The place has a strong or special association with a particular community or cultural group for social, cultural or spiritual reasons.

It has close associations with the people of the Childers district as a community facility and with the work of the Queensland Ambulance Transport Brigade.
