= Eureka, Queensland =

Eureka
- Suburb
- Interactive map of Eureka
- Coordinates: 25.2775°S 152.1691°E
- Country: Australia
- State: Queensland
- LGA: Bundaberg Region
- Location: 17.5 km (10.9 mi) SW of Childers; 64.3 km (40.0 mi) SSW of Bundaberg; 75.9 km (47.2 mi) W of Hervey Bay; 333 km (207 mi) N of Brisbane

Government
  - State electorate: Burnett
  - Federal division: Hinkler

Area
  - Total: 100.6 km^{2} (38.8 sq mi)

Population
  - Total: 223 (2021 census)
  - Density: 2.217/km^{2} (5.741/sq mi)
- Time zone: UTC+10:00 (AEST)
- Postcode: 4660
Suburbs around Eureka
Booyal	Isis Central	Apple Tree Creek
Booyal	Eureka	Kullogum
Golden Fleece	Golden Fleece	Kullogum

Eureka is a rural locality in the Bundaberg Region, Queensland, Australia. In the 2021 census, Eureka had a population of 223 people.

== History ==
In 1887, 20,480 acres (8,290 ha) of land were resumed from the Eureka (Toomolongyore) pastoral run. The land was offered for selection for the establishment of small farms on 17 April 1887.

== Demographics ==
In the 2016 census, Eureka had a population of 170 people.

In the 2021 census, Eureka had a population of 223 people.

== Education ==
There are no schools in Eureka. The nearest government primary schools are Childers State School in Childers, Booyal State School in Booyal, Cordalba State School in Cordalba, and Dallarnil State School in Dallarnil. The nearest government secondary school is Isis District State High School, also in Childers.
