= Gregory River =

Gregory River may refer to:

- Gregory River (Australia), a river that flows into the Gulf of Carpentaria
- Gregory River, Queensland (Bundaberg Region), a locality in Australia
- Gregory River, Queensland (Whitsunday Region), a locality in Australia
