= Abington, Queensland =

Abington
- Suburb
- Interactive map of Abington
- Coordinates: 25.2052°S 152.3469°E
- Country: Australia
- State: Queensland
- LGA: Bundaberg Region
- Location: 10.3 km (6.4 mi) NE of Childers; 44.3 km (27.5 mi) S of Bundaberg CBD; 313 km (194 mi) N of Brisbane

Government
  - State electorate: Burnett
  - Federal division: Hinkler

Area
  - Total: 19.5 km^{2} (7.5 sq mi)

Population
  - Total: 60 (2021 census)
  - Density: 3.08/km^{2} (8.0/sq mi)
- Time zone: UTC+10:00 (AEST)
- Postcode: 4660
Suburbs around Abington
Redridge	Redridge	Redridge
North Isis	Abington	Isis River
Horton	Horton	Isis River

Abington is a rural locality in the Bundaberg Region, Queensland, Australia. In the 2021 census, Abington had a population of 60 people.

== Geography ==
The area is home to multiple aquacultures and farms.

== Demographics ==
In the 2016 census, Abington had a population of 60 people.

In the 2021 census, Abington had a population of 60 people in 15 families. The median age is 43 years.

== Education ==
There are no schools in Abington. The nearest government primary schools are Childers State School in Childers to the south-west and Goodwood State School in Goodwood to the north. The nearest government secondary school is Isis District State High School, also in Childers.
