= Coronation Building, Childers =

Coronation Building
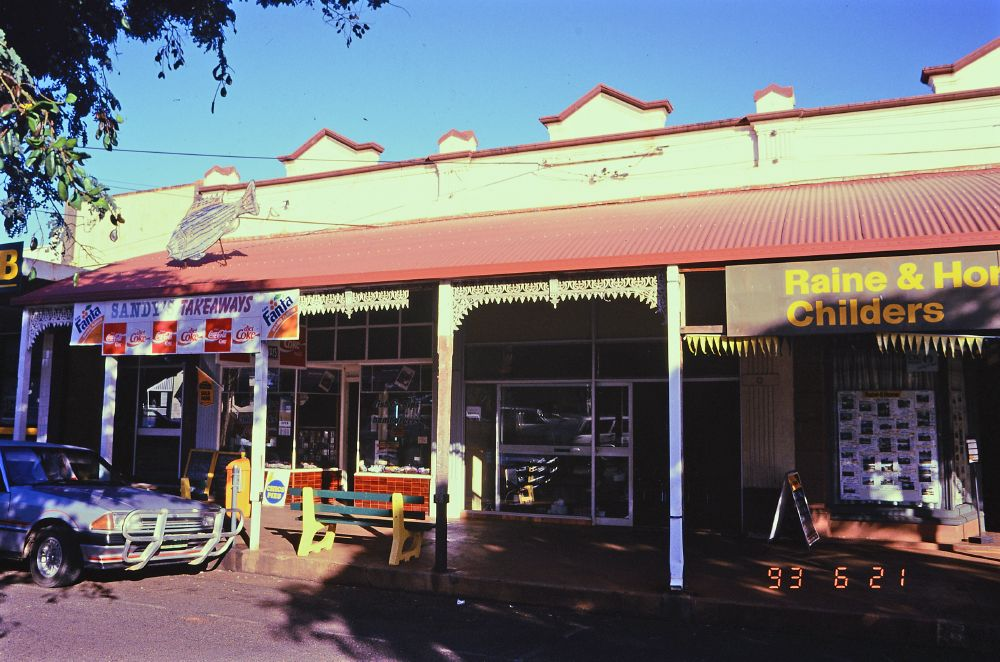
- Coronation Building shops, 1993

- Location within Queensland Location within Australia
- 25.2368°S 152.2776°E
- Location: 102–108 Churchill Street, Childers, Bundaberg Region, Queensland, Australia

Queensland Heritage Register
- Official name: Shops at 102–108 Churchill St, Coronation Building
- Type: state heritage (built)
- Designated: 21 October 1992
- Reference no.: 600629
- Significant period: 1900s, 1910s (fabric) c. 1902–ongoing (historical retail use)

The Coronation Building is a heritage-listed row of shops at 102–108 Churchill Street, Childers, Bundaberg Region, Queensland, Australia. It was added to the Queensland Heritage Register on 21 October 1992.

== History ==
This set of four shops was erected in two stages in the early 1900s in Childers main street for Johann Wilhelm Albert Kulick, owner of the adjoining Grand Hotel. The first set of two (102 and 104) was erected between 1902 and 1907, the second set of two (106 and 108) was erected c. 1913.

The town of Childers grew up around a railway terminus opened in 1887 to facilitate timber getting in the Isis Scrub. By 1903, when the Isis Shire Council was formed, Childers had become the administrative centre of a prosperous sugar growing region with several local sugar mills and a large seasonal population, including, until the turn of the century, Kanaka labourers, who came to cut cane. From the 1950s increasing mechanisation in the sugar industry resulted in a decreasing population. In the 1980s, Childers, whilst remaining a "sugar town", also became known as a "heritage town", with much of the main street being listed by the National Trust as part of a conservation area.

In common with a number of other Queensland towns, Childers was surveyed as a private town rather than by surveyors appointed by the colonial government. In the 1890s much of the main street, including this site, was subdivided into small allotments. In 1894, Frederick John Charlton and Henry Jardine Gray sold the site containing 1 rood 17.39 perches (1,452 m^{2}) to William Ashby. Ashby also owned the adjoining block on which stood the Childers (later Grand) Hotel. In 1897 the property was sold to Kulick. A single storeyed timber store known to have been on the site by 1900, may have been financed by a mortgage for £800 Kulick took out in 1897. In March 1902 fire destroyed many of the shops along the southern side of Childers' main street, which were subsequently replaced by masonry buildings. The timber store, then known as Martin's auction rooms, was however, spared.

By 1907, the timber shop had been replaced. The first set of two masonry shops (102 and 104) was erected on the eastern side of the site. About this time, the Comino Bros established a fruit and refreshment business in no 102; no 104 was occupied by the local newspaper, the Isis Recorder. By c. 1913, the second set of shops was erected, with Dittmer's Book and Stationery store occupying no 106 for some fifty years. At the time of heritage listing, tenants were Weller's Shoe Shop (102), two cafes (104, 108), and a real estate office (106). In 2015, the building houses a real estate office (102), a bakery (104), an Indian restaurant (106) and a Vietnamese restaurant (108).

The shops were purchased by the Comino brothers in 1925. Their fruit shop was then moved from no 102 to no 108, where it remained until the 1960s. John, Paul, George, and Arthur Comino arrived in Childers from the Greek island of Kythera in the early 1900s. Soon after they established the fruit and refreshment business in the town, and later the Marble Cafe at 58 Churchill Street, which Paul Comino ran, until his death in 1978.

== Description ==
102–108 Churchill St comprises two pairs of single-storeyed rendered masonry shops with pitched corrugated iron roofs. The shops are united by a common parapet and awning. The building abuts the two storeyed Grand Hotel to the west, and continues the line, scale and form of awnings and parapets of Churchill St to the east. Nos 102 and 104 are modest shops with arched brick voussoirs and hipped roofs to the rear, while nos 106 and 108 are longer skylit shops with concrete lintels and parapeted gables to the rear.

The shops have a gently curved corrugated iron awning supported on an exposed timber frame and square posts. Like many awnings on Churchill Street, it creates a space of generous proportions. The posts have an idiosyncratic variety of bases. Ornamental detail to the building includes cast iron valances and trim to the awning, and flat-ended pediments rising above the cornice line, which are interspersed with gabled capping to externally expressed piers. The parapet is a modest version of the pedimented parapets further along Churchill Street.

The tall shop fronts to nos 106 and 108 have large timber beaded display windows and recessed central timber French doors. The shopfronts are separated by rusticated piers. The display window to no 106 is particularly fine and intact, retaining its timber stall risers, internal glazed and gridded timber panels and external coloured and frosted glass panes above the display area. Both shops have recessed timber French doors, tall fanlights, and fanned patterns in the ceiling panels above the door. Internally, nos 106 and 108 are impressive shop spaces with high ceilings, a central clerestory skylight and exposed Queen post trusses. The ceilings are timber boarded, half-raked, and have square lattice vents.

Nos 102 to 104 have flat timber boarded ceilings with central sheeted areas indicating that skylights have been closed off. The floors have patterned sections of ceramic tiles towards the front of the shops. The shopfront to no 102 is timber beaded with a central recessed entry, while the shopfront to no 104 has been more recently replaced with aluminium sliding doors.

102–108 Churchill Street contains two impressive shop interiors (106, 108), fine shopfronts, and contributes in form, scale, and materials to the architecturally coherent Churchill Street streetscape.

== Heritage listing ==
The Coronation Building was listed on the Queensland Heritage Register on 21 October 1992 having satisfied the following criteria.

The place is important in demonstrating the evolution or pattern of Queensland's history.

The Shops at 102–108 Churchill Street, Childers, erected in the early 1900s, are important in demonstrating the evolution of Queensland's history, being evidence of the development of Childers in the early 20th century as a prosperous timber and sugar town, forming the heart of the Isis Shire, and in particular the rebuilding of the south side of the main street in the early 1900s.

The place is important in demonstrating the principal characteristics of a particular class of cultural places.

The place is important in demonstrating the principal characteristics of both an early 1900s country town commercial building in general (particularly the parapets, awnings, shop fronts, overall form and, in the case of Nos 106 and 108, the interiors) and early 1900s Childers commercial buildings in particular, (particularly the form, scale, materials and, in the case of Nos. 106 and 108, the interiors).

The place is important because of its aesthetic significance.

It is important in exhibiting a range of aesthetic characteristics valued by the Childers community and visitors alike, in particular the spatial proportions, exposed trusses and clerestory lighting of Nos 106 and 108, which contribute to impressive shop interiors; the fine intact shopfronts, in particular of No 106; and the building's contribution in form, scale, and materials to the architecturally coherent and picturesque Churchill Street streetscape.

The place has a special association with the life or work of a particular person, group or organisation of importance in Queensland's history.

It has a special association with the life and work of the Comino family, a characteristic Greek immigrant trading family, and with the Dittmer family (106).
