= Shops and Cafe, Childers =

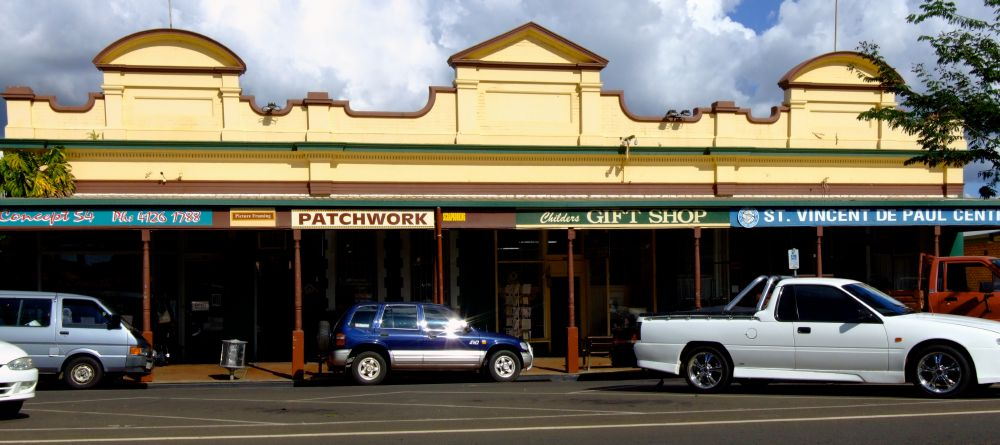
- Shops and Cafe, 2008

- Location within Queensland Location within Australia
- 25.2366°S 152.2793°E
- Location: 54–58 Churchill Street, Childers, Bundaberg Region, Queensland, Australia

History
- Design period: 1900–1914 (early 20th century)
- Built: c. 1912–1930s

Site notes
- Architect: F H Faircloth

Queensland Heritage Register
- Official name: Shops and Cafe 54-58 Churchill Street
- Type: state heritage (built)
- Designated: 21 October 1992
- Reference no.: 600612
- Significant period: 1910s, 1930s (fabric); 1912–ongoing (cafe historical use); 1930s–1950s (bank use); 1930s-1980s (news
- Significant components: strong room

Shops and Cafe is a heritage-listed row of shops at 54–58 Churchill Street, Childers, Bundaberg Region, Queensland, Australia. It was designed by F H Faircloth and built from c. 1912 to 1930s. It was added to the Queensland Heritage Register on 21 October 1992.

== History ==
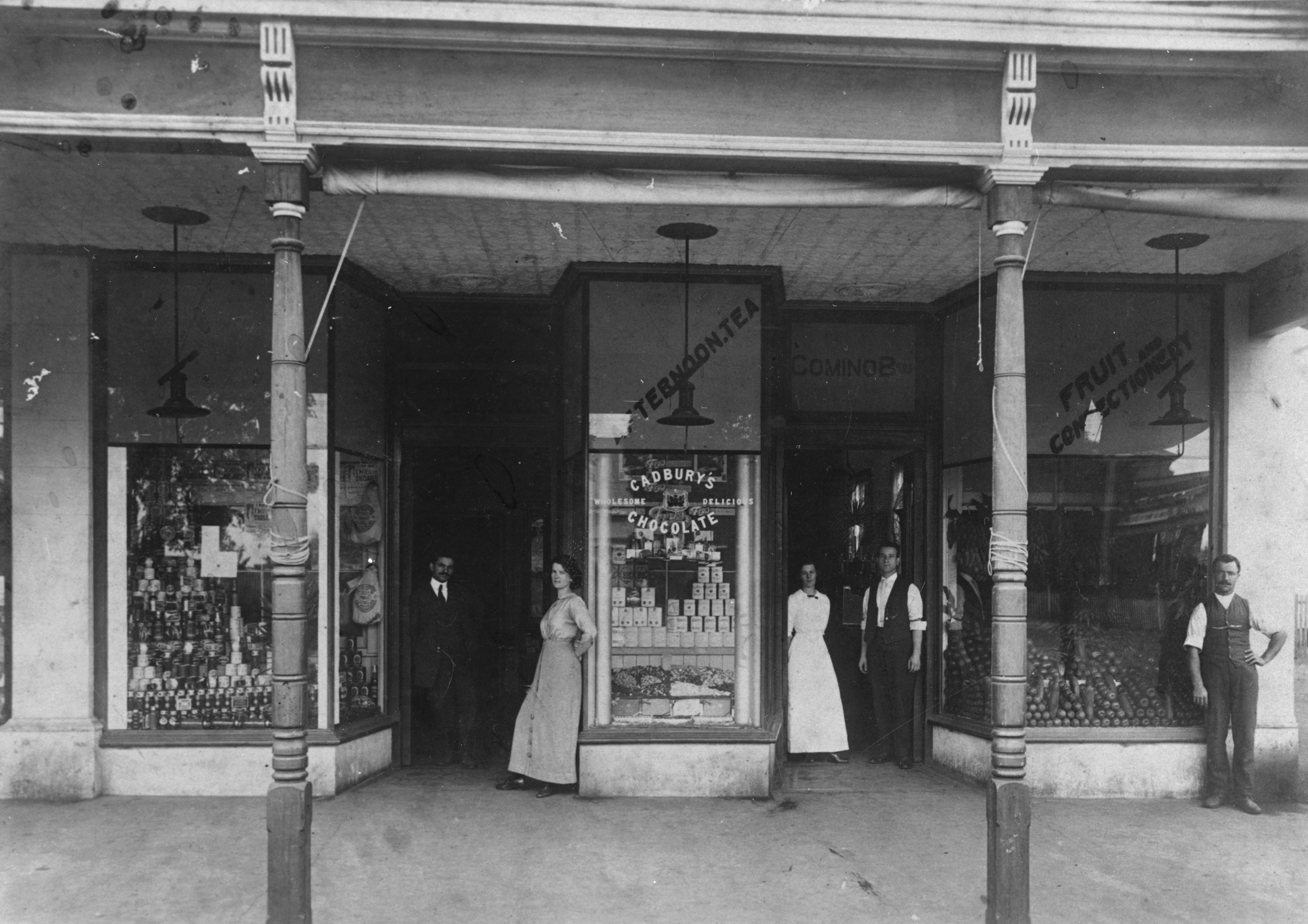
Comino brothers' cafe and fruiterers, circa 1920

54–58 Churchill Street, comprising three shops and a cafe, was erected c. 1912 in Childers' main street, for local farmers Robert Gant and William Brand (senior).

The town of Childers grew up around a railway terminus opened in 1887 to facilitate timber getting in the Isis Scrub. By 1903, when the Isis Shire Council was formed, Childers had become the administrative centre of a prosperous sugar growing region with several local sugar mills and a large seasonal population, including, until the turn of the century, Kanaka labourers, who came to cut cane. From the 1950s increasing mechanisation in the sugar industry resulted in a decreasing population. In the 1980s, Childers, whilst remaining a "sugar town" also became known as a "heritage town", with much of the main street being listed by the National Trust as part of a conservation area.

In common with a number of other Queensland towns, Childers was surveyed as a private town rather than by surveyors appointed by the colonial government. In the 1890s much of the main street, including this site, was subdivided into small allotments. The site (known as resub 9) was acquired by William Thompson and Robert Dinnie of Childers in 1895 from Frederick John Charlton and Henry Jardine Gray. In the following year it was transferred to Robert Hancock; after his death in 1898, it passed to trustees. By 1900 a single skinned timber shop, probably known as Cocking's store is known to have been on the site. In March 1902 fire destroyed many of the shops along the southern side of Childers' main street, which were subsequently replaced by masonry buildings. The timber store on resub 9 was, however, spared.

In 1908, the property was acquired by Gant and Brand. By 1912, the timber shop had been replaced by the existing masonry building, believed to have been designed by Bundaberg architect, FH Faircloth, who was responsible for the design of many of the new buildings erected after the 1902 fire. In that year, resub 9 was subdivided. Sub 1 (nos 54 and 56) remained with Gant and Brand; sub 2 containing the Marble Cafe (no 58) was acquired by John Comino.

The Comino brothers, John, Paul, George, and Arthur arrived in Childers from the Greek island of Kythera in the early 1900s. Soon after they established a fruit and refreshment business in the town, apparently at 102 Churchill Street (Coronation Building). The Marble Cafe was established in the new building erected by Gant and Brand. The business comprised a fruit shop, wine bar, and cafe, which catered to the large population of workers associated with the surrounding sugar farms. The cafe was furnished with silky oak fittings, potted palms, and tables with Italian carrera marble tops, which gave the cafe its name. The cafe was run by Paul Comino until his death in 1978, after which time the fittings were sold.

Sub 1 (nos 54 and 56) remained in the ownership of Gant and Brand, and their respective estates, until 1959. It is not clear whether this part of the building was erected as one or a number of shops. However, it appears, that by the 1930s, it contained the three existing shops. For twenty years from the early 1930s, part of no 56 was leased to the Union Bank of Australia Ltd (now the ANZ Bank). Alterations including the installation of bars over the bank windows (part of no 56); the installation of a glazed shop front to the adjoining shop (part of no 56); and alterations to the awning of the building including sheeting the timber soffit with pressed metal may have been carried out about this time. Tenants of the other shops at this time were tailor, A Crossley (54) and the local newspaper, the Isis Recorder (part of no 56), who remained a tenant until the 1980s, taking over the bank premises as well from the 1950s. More recently, the shop at no 54 was used as electoral offices for the local Parliamentary members.

Since 1959, when Paul Comino acquired the three shops, members of the Comino family have owned the four premises comprising the building. The shops are currently occupied by a florist (54), St Vincent de Paul (56), a dress shop (56), and the Marble Cafe (58).

== Description ==
54–58 Churchill Street is single-storeyed rendered masonry building with pitched corrugated iron roofs, comprising four internally disparate shops which are united by a common parapet and awning. The building is similar in materials, scale and parapet features to other commercial buildings on Churchill St. It is located on a bend at the eastern end of the street, and contributes significantly to the picturesque townscape of the street.

The building sits on a wedge-shaped block, and has a truncated eastern frontage. The different shops reflect their different uses: no 54 is a small shop with a single display window; no 56 comprises two shops, a former bank, more generously proportioned than its neighbour, which has a rendered masonry street facade, and a narrow shop with a two display windows and a central entrance; no 58 is a large skylit cafe with two entrances and three display windows.

The street facade which links these shops comprises a substantial parapet, a flat sheet metal awning, shopfronts combined with a rendered brickwork facade. The awning is supported on turned timber posts which have an idiosyncratic variety of bases. It has a pressed metal ceiling with rich geometric floral motifs, and metal roses which are centred over each shop entrance. The front parapet has prominent features, with three recessed and framed panels topped with arched and triangular pediments rising above a deep cornice. The panels are spaced with expressed piers, and shaped parapet tops run between the pediments.

The building has fine intact display windows, with delicate timber beading around broad glass panels, recessed entrances with timber double doors, and timber stall risers. No 58 has a central bay supported by two internal columns with fanned capitals. Nos 58 and the shop at no 56 also retain their internal glazed and framed panels to the back of the display windows. The former bank at no 56 has barred rectangular windows with toothed white cement-rendered surrounds.

No 58 has a generously proportioned and impressive internal space, with a high timber lined half-raked ceiling with metal roses, a central rectangular clerestory skylight and exposed hammerbeam trusses. No 58 also has a timber lined and sheeted "clubroom" to the rear which is externally clad in weatherboard. The shop at no 56 has a flat timber boarded ceiling with several evenly-spaced funnel-shaped skylights which have been sealed over. The former bank at no 56 also has a timber lined ceiling, with metal roses, and contains a now disused rendered concrete strong room. All of the shops have areas of diamond-patterned ceramic tiled floors.

54–58 Churchill Street has a fine decorative facade, awning and shopfronts. No 58 has an aesthetically impressive interior, whilst other interiors appear to relate strongly to their former uses. The building makes a significant contribution to the picturesque townscape of Churchill Street, in its location, form, scale, and materials.

== Heritage listing ==
The Shops and Cafe at 54–58 Churchill Street, Chiilders was listed on the Queensland Heritage Register on 21 October 1992 having satisfied the following criteria.

The place is important in demonstrating the evolution or pattern of Queensland's history.

The shops and cafe at 54–58 Churchill Street, Childers, erected c. 1912, are important in demonstrating the evolution of Queensland's history, being evidence of the development of Childers in the early 20th century as a prosperous timber and sugar town, forming the heart of the Isis Shire, and in particular the rebuilding of the south side of the main street in the early 1900s.

The place is important in demonstrating the principal characteristics of a particular class of cultural places.

The place is important in demonstrating the principal characteristics of both an early 1900s country town commercial building in general (in particular the parapets, awnings, shop fronts, and overall form) and early 1900s Childers commercial buildings in particular, (in particular the form, scale, and materials).

The place is important because of its aesthetic significance.

It is important in exhibiting a range of aesthetic characteristics valued by the Childers community and visitors alike, including the spatial proportions, exposed trusses and clerestory lighting of no.58 which contribute to an impressive shop interior; the fine decorative parapet, awning, and shopfronts; and the building's significant contribution in form, scale, materials, and details to the architecturally coherent and picturesque Churchill Street streetscape and townscape.

The place has a special association with the life or work of a particular person, group or organisation of importance in Queensland's history.

The place has a special association with the life and work of the Comino family, a characteristic Greek immigrant trading family; with the local newspaper, the Isis Recorder; and with Bundaberg architect FH Faircloth, as an example of his work.
