= Gregory River, Queensland =

Gregory River, Queensland may refer to:

- Gregory River, Queensland (Bundaberg Region), a locality in the Bundaberg Region
- Gregory River, Queensland (Whitsunday Region), a locality in the Whitsunday Region
- Gregory River (Australia), a river than flows into the Gulf of Carpentaria
