= North Gregory, Queensland =

North Gregory
- Suburb
- Interactive map of North Gregory
- Coordinates: 25.0511°S 152.2886°E
- Country: Australia
- State: Queensland
- LGA: Bundaberg Region
- Location: 22.7 km (14.1 mi) N of Childers; 31.1 km (19.3 mi) SW of Bundaberg CBD; 330 km (210 mi) N of Brisbane

Government
  - State electorate: Burnett
  - Federal division: Hinkler

Area
  - Total: 65.2 km^{2} (25.2 sq mi)

Population
  - Total: 89 (2021 census)
  - Density: 1.365/km^{2} (3.535/sq mi)
- Time zone: UTC+10:00 (AEST)
- Postcode: 4660
Suburbs around North Gregory
Elliott	Elliott	Elliott
Elliott	North Gregory	Goodwood
Gregory River	Farnsfield	Goodwood

North Gregory is a rural locality in the Bundaberg Region, Queensland, Australia. In the 2021 census, North Gregory had a population of 89 people.

== Geography ==
The Gregory River forms the southern boundary.

Childers Road (State Route 3) runs along the south-western boundary.

== History ==
Gregory Provisional School opened on 9 July 1900. The school became Walluma Provisional School in 1904 and then Walluma State School in 1909 and closed approximately 1912. It was at 496 Foleys Road (approx 25.0744°S 152.2748°E).

== Demographics ==
In the 2016 census, North Gregory had a population of 59 people.

In the 2021 census, North Gregory had a population of 89 people.

== Education ==
There are no schools in North Gregory. The nearest government primary schools are Givelda State School in Givelda to the north-west, Cordalba State School in Cordalba to the south-west, and Goodwood State School in neighbouring Goodwood to the south-east. The nearest government secondary schools are Isis District State High School in Childers to the south and Bundaberg State High School in Bundaberg South, Bundaberg.
