= Apple Tree Creek, Queensland =

Apple Tree Creek
- Town
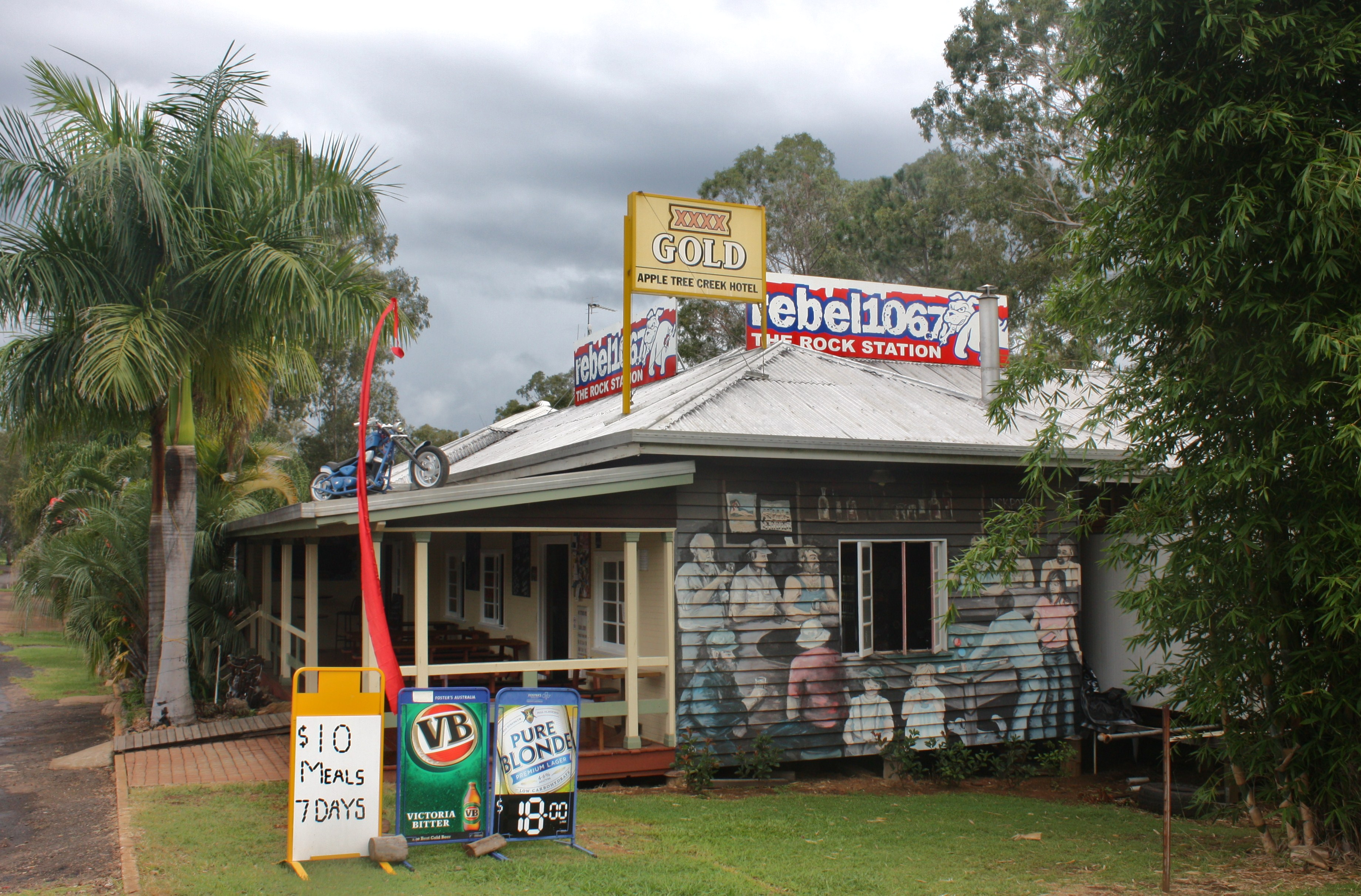
- Apple Tree Creek Hotel

- Interactive map of Apple Tree Creek
- Coordinates: 25.2244°S 152.2383°E
- Country: Australia
- State: Queensland
- LGA: Bundaberg Region
- Location: 5.9 km (3.7 mi) W of Childers; 48.9 km (30.4 mi) SSW of Bundaberg; 64.7 km (40.2 mi) WNW of Hervay Bay; 324 km (201 mi) N of Brisbane

Government
  - State electorate: Burnett
  - Federal division: Hinkler

Area
  - Total: 23.7 km^{2} (9.2 sq mi)

Population
  - Total: 726 (2021 census)
  - Density: 30.63/km^{2} (79.34/sq mi)
- Postcode: 4660
Localities around Apple Tree Creek
Isis Central	North Isis	North Isis
Eureka	Apple Tree Creek	Childers
Eureka	Kullogum	Kullogum

Apple Tree Creek is a rural town and locality in the Bundaberg Region, Queensland, Australia. It was formerly known as Bodalla, the Dundaburra people of the Northern Kabi group name from the Gregory River Plum which to first Europeans looked like an apple. Prior to settlement of the Isis District which includes Apple Tree Creek, the area was called Buth'arth translating to scrub. The town was renamed as Apple Tree Creek in 1962. In the 2021 census, the locality of Apple Tree Creek had a population of 726 people.

== Geography ==
Apple Tree Creek is located 6 kilometres (3.7 mi) north-west of Childers on the Isis Highway.

== History ==
The area was called Buth'arth meaning scrub in Dundaburra language.

European settlers entered the district from the 1840s. The initial industries were grazing, sawmilling and then growing sugarcane.

Apple Tree Creek Provisional School opened on 28 November 1887. It became Apple Tree Creek State School on 5 July 1897. It closed on 21 December 1969. It was on McGibbon Street (approx 25.2146°S 152.2342°E).

In 1896, a railway line extending from Childers to Cordalba was erected, bypassing Apple Tree Creek.

The Apple Tree Creek cemetery was established in 1896.

The Apple Tree Creek Post Office opened around January 1909 (a receiving office had been open since 1898) and closed in 1975.

St Anne's Anglican Church was dedicated on 10 July 1930 by Venerable William Powning Glover, Archdeacon of Toowoomba. It has since closed.

== Demographics ==
In the 2011 census, the town of Apple Tree Creek had a population of 509 people.

In the 2016 census, the locality of Apple Tree Creek had a population of 639 people.

In the 2021 census, the locality of Apple Tree Creek had a population of 726 people.

== Heritage listings ==
Apple Tree Creek has a number of heritage-listed sites, including:

- Apple Tree Creek War Memorial, Bruce Highway
- Apple Tree Creek Cemetery, Drummond Street (near the junction with Gentle Annie Road, 25.2243°S 152.2379°E)

== Education ==
There are no schools in Apple Tree Creek. The nearest government primary schools are Childers State School in neighbouring Childers to the east and Cordalba State School in Cordalba to the north. The nearest government secondary school is Isis District State High School, also in Childers.
