= Goodwood, Queensland =

Goodwood
- Suburb
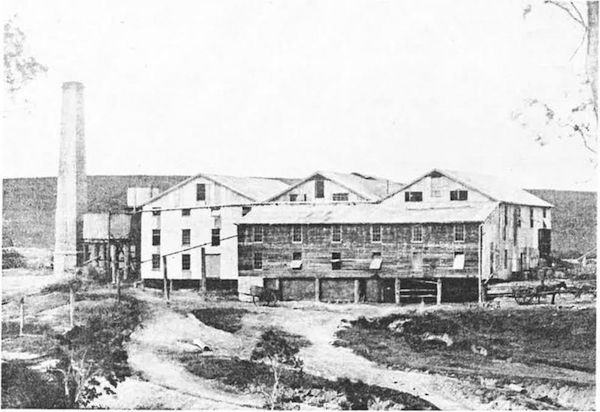
- Goodwood sugar mill, circa 1900

- Interactive map of Goodwood
- Coordinates: 25.1052°S 152.3788°E
- Country: Australia
- State: Queensland
- LGA: Bundaberg Region
- Location: 19.4 km (12.1 mi) NE of Childers; 35.7 km (22.2 mi) S of Bundaberg CBD; 73.8 km (45.9 mi) NW of Hervey Bay; 391 km (243 mi) N of Brisbane

Government
  - State electorate: Burnett
  - Federal division: Hinkler

Area
  - Total: 76.1 km^{2} (29.4 sq mi)

Population
  - Total: 155 (2021 census)
  - Density: 2.037/km^{2} (5.275/sq mi)
- Time zone: UTC+10:00 (AEST)
- Postcode: 4660
Suburbs around Goodwood
North Gregory	Elliott	Kinkuna
Farnsfield	Goodwood	Woodgate
Farnsfield	Redridge	Buxton

Goodwood is a rural locality in the Bundaberg Region, Queensland, Australia. In the 2021 census, Goodwood had a population of 155 people.

== Geography ==
The North Coast railway line enters the locality from the south-west (Buxton) and runs immediately east and parallel with Goodwood's eastern boundary, exiting to the north-east (Kinkunda). The locality is served byKinkuna railway station (25.0529°S 152.3959°E) and Goodwood railway station (25.1453°S 152.4109°E).

Part of the Burrum Coast National Park is in the east of the locality extending into neighbouring Kinkuna and Woodgate to the north-east and east. Apart from this protected area, the land use varies from sugarcane farming in the north of the locality, forestry in the west of the locality, residential use and crop growing in the south of the locality, with grazing on native vegetation in the centre of the locality.

== History ==
Goodwood sugar mill was established in 1885, the first sugar mill to be built in the Isis district and resulted in the creation of the Goodwood community. It was sold in 1916 and closed in 1917 with the sugarcane then being processed at the Fairymead sugar mill.

Goodwood Provisional School opened on 18 October 1900. On 1 January 1909, it became Goodwood State School.

== Demographics ==
In the 2016 census, Goodwood had a population of 175 people.

In the 2021 census, Goodwood had a population of 155 people.

== Education ==
Goodwood State School is a government primary (Prep-6) school for boys and girls at 1802 Goodwood Road (25.1455°S 152.3845°E). In 2018, the school had an enrolment of 45 students with 3 teachers (2 full-time equivalent) and 6 non-teaching staff (3 full-time equivalent).

As Goodwood State School is located in the south of the locality, Alloway State School in Alloway to the north also serves the locality. The nearest government secondary schools are Isis District State High School in Childers to the south-west and Bundaberg State High School in Bundaberg South. There are also a number of non-government schools in Bundaberg and Childers.
