= Farnsfield, Queensland =

Suburb of Bundaberg Region, Queensland, Australia

Farnsfield
- Suburb
- Interactive map of Farnsfield
- Coordinates: 25.1086°S 152.3066°E
- Country: Australia
- State: Queensland
- LGA: Bundaberg Region
- Location: 16.1 km (10.0 mi) N of Childers; 35.9 km (22.3 mi) SSW of Bundaberg CBD; 332 km (206 mi) N of Brisbane

Government
  - State electorate: Burnett
  - Federal division: Hinkler

Area
  - Total: 65.4 km^{2} (25.3 sq mi)

Population
  - Total: 95 (2021 census)
  - Density: 1.453/km^{2} (3.762/sq mi)
- Time zone: UTC+10:00 (AEST)
- Postcode: 4660
Suburbs around Farnsfield
Gregory River	North Gregory	Goodwood
Gregory River	Farnsfield	Goodwood
North Isis	North Isis	Redridge

Farnsfield is a rural locality in the Bundaberg Region, Queensland, Australia. In the 2021 census, Farnsfield had a population of 95 people.

== Geography ==
The Gregory River forms the northern and north-eastern boundaries. Sandy Creek rises in the south of the locality and flows east, forming a small section of the southern boundary and another of the south-eastern boundary before joining the Gregory.

== Demographics ==
In the 2016 census, Farnsfield had a population of 124 people.

In the 2021 census, Farnsfield had a population of 95 people.

== Education ==
There are no schools in Farnsfield. The nearest government primary schools are Cordalba State School in Cordalba to the south-west, Goodwood State School in neighbouring Goodwood to the east, and Childers State School in Childers to the south. The nearest government secondary school is Isis District State High School, also in Childers.
