= Goodwood railway station, Queensland =

Former railway station in Queensland, Australia

Goodwood

General information
- Location: Woodgate Road, Goodwood, Queensland
- Coordinates: 25°08′34″S 152°24′40″E
- Line: North Coast Line
- Connections: no connections

History
- Closed: Yes
Former names
Gregory
Preceding station	Queensland Rail	Following station
Howard towards Brisbane	North Coast line	Kinkuna towards Cairns
Location

Goodwood railway station is a closed railway station on the North Coast railway line, Queensland. The Goodwood railway station building was donated to Hervey Bay museum on Zephyr Street after the station itself closed. There is nothing of the station left.

Prior to 27 June 1893 the station was named Gregory.
