= Apple Tree Creek War Memorial =

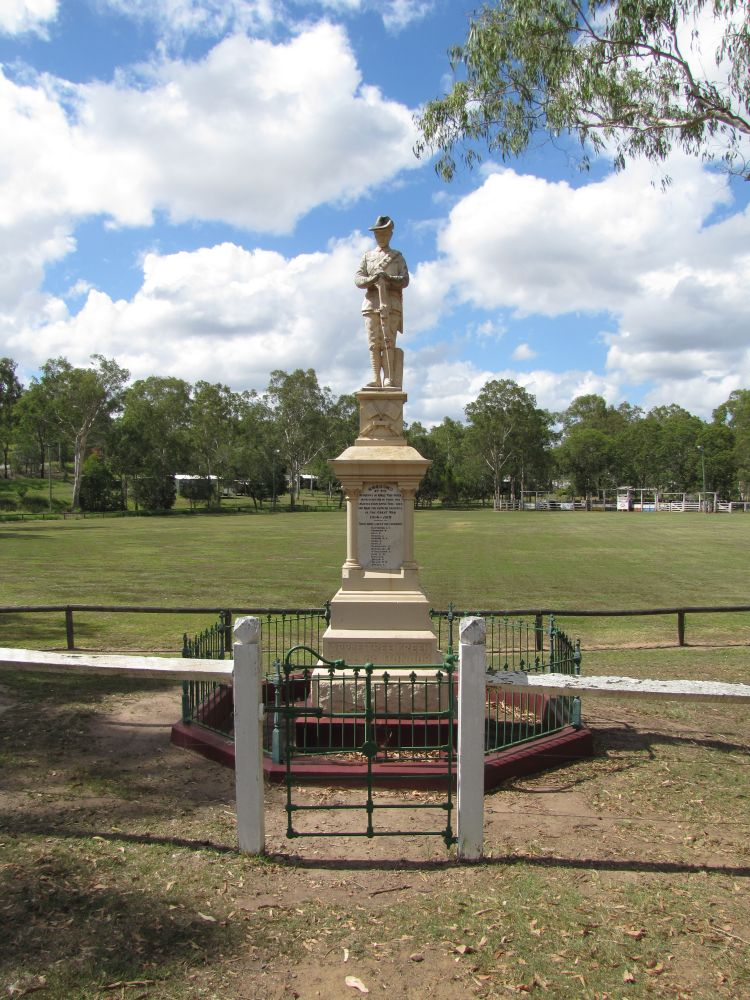
- Apple Tree Creek War Memorial, 2014

- Location within Queensland Location within Australia
- 25.2208°S 152.239°E
- Location: Bruce Highway, Apple Tree Creek, Bundaberg Region, Queensland, Australia

History
- Design period: 1919 - 1930s (interwar period)
- Built: 1921

Site notes
- Architect: Andrew Lang Petrie

Queensland Heritage Register
- Official name: Apple Tree Creek War Memorial, Apple Tree Creek
- Type: state heritage (built)
- Designated: 21 October 1992
- Reference no.: 600607
- Significant period: 1921- (social); 1921- (historical); 1911-1921(fabric)
- Significant components: memorial surrounds/railings, cricket pitch, bandstand/rotunda, memorial - obelisk, rodeo ring
- Builders: Andrew Lang Petrie

Apple Tree Creek War Memorial is a heritage-listed memorial at Bruce Highway, Apple Tree Creek, Bundaberg Region, Queensland, Australia. It was designed and built in 1921 by Andrew Lang Petrie. It was added to the Queensland Heritage Register on 21 October 1992.

== History ==
The Apple Tree Creek War Memorial was unveiled on 20 March 1921. It was designed and produced by Andrew Lang Petrie of Toowong, Brisbane at a cost of £230. The stone memorial honours the 77 local men who served during the First World War, including the 15 who died.

Apple Tree Creek developed as a farming community in the 1870s and 80s. The Central Sugar Mill opened in 1895 boosting the economy of the district and by the outbreak of the First World War there were fifty farmers registered in the Post Office Directory, a school, hotel, and store. The 77 men who volunteered from this district represented a substantial proportion of their generation and a movement to commemorate their participation began in 1917.

Prior to the erection of war memorials, Queensland had little public sculpture and there were few statues or monuments of note even in Brisbane. Although Queensland did send a contingent of men to South Africa during the Boer War (1899–1902) memorials to soldiers who served in this war are uncommon. Australia's participation in the First World War (1914–1918) however, had an immense impact on the population. The national loss was 60,000 dead and 152,000 wounded from a population of approximately 5 million. Almost 1 in 5 men who went to fight died and their bodies were not returned for burial. The battles were fought in countries far from Australia and even after the war visiting cemeteries in the countries where Australians fought was not possible for most families. The impetus for the creation of memorials as an expression of public mourning was therefore very strong and they became a focus for an outpouring of grief.

As substitute war graves they became symbols of remembrance which were treated with reverence and respect. The prominent siting of war memorials and the materials, designs and symbolism used in their construction were meant to honour those who served, ensure lasting remembrance of the dead and draw the attention of the "rising generation" to their noble example. The memorials also served as an acknowledgment of what was seen as a coming of age for Australia as a nation and memorials honour those who died as having made "the supreme sacrifice " for the good of nation and empire. As memorials were funded by the community, they are true public expression of both grief and national pride and were erected in almost every community. No war since has triggered this kind of response; the dead of World War Two being commemorated largely by adding their names to World War One memorials or by dedicating practical projects to their memory.

The Apple Tree Creek memorial was funded by public subscription and prominently positioned in the local recreation reserve. This not only provided an attractive setting, but was a community gathering place and was sited opposite the local school. It was unveiled on 20 March 1921 and was originally crowned with a "digger" statue. Although not highly regarded by artists or architects, this design was the popular choice of Queensland communities, perhaps seeming more personal to families and representing the qualities of the ideal Australian. Most statues were constructed by local masonry firms, although some were imported. They varied slightly in design, presumably to suit the needs of the communities who commissioned them. Originally a captured gun or "war trophy" contributed to the setting; however, this has now gone. The pedestal of the memorial is a standard A L Petrie design, first used in 1918 at Ebbw Vale.

Andrew Lang Petrie was the grandson of Andrew Petrie, an early colonist of Queensland and a prominent architect-builder. When Petrie Senior died in 1872, he was succeeded by his son John Petrie. In 1880, A L Petrie joined his father to form the partnership John Petrie and Son, based at Fortitude Valley with branch masonry works at Toowong Cemetery and Townsville. In 1888, A L Petrie became general manager of the firm but was forced into insolvency in 1894. It was not until 1903 that he was able to re-open the monumental masonry business at Toowong Cemetery where many Queensland memorials were produced.

In the mid 1970s the memorial was vandalised. The surviving pieces of the statue were removed and put in storage at the RSL sub-branch at Childers. The statue was replaced by a concrete obelisk until a new digger was unveiled on 18 August 1999 by the Honourable Bruce Scott.

The reserve also contains a band rotunda in the vicinity of the memorial. This was built in 1911 for the Apple Tree Creek Citizens' Brass Band. It was in regular use for the first decades because many houses lined the creek at that time. By 1975 it had become derelict and underwent extensive repair and reconstruction in 1983. It is one of the few buildings remaining from the early settlement of the area and contributes to the aesthetic qualities of the park.

== Description ==
The First World War Memorial is situated facing the road in a landscaped area within the Apple Tree Creek sports ground which encompasses a cricket ground, rodeo ring and small band rotunda.

The memorial comprises a pedestal surmounted by a small concrete obelisk. It is surrounded by an octagonal enclosure of concrete kerbing with a decorative cast-iron fence comprising thin pickets with fleur-de-lis finials. The posts are also cast iron and surmounted by Latin crosses. In front of the enclosure is a painted timber fence with a centrally placed cast-iron gate.

The monument is of Helidon sandstone and sits on a granite base with rough stone faces, margined and chiselled around. Surmounting this are another two steps, both smooth-faced. The lower step has a chamfered top and the words Apple Tree Creek Roll of Honour carved in high relief on the front face. The upper step has plain faces and is capped by cyma recta mouldings.

Surmounting this is the pedestal dado comprising a recessed square marble pillar with engaged columns at each corner. It has recessed marble plaques to each side recording the leaded names of the 77 local men who served in the First World War, the names of the 15 who fell being on the front face.

The columns have capitals of scrollwork and acanthus leaves which support a large cornice made up of cyma recta and torus mouldings. Above this is a small square pedestal with crossed flags carved in relief on the front face and capped by a small cornice. This forms the base for a small concrete obelisk with tapered sides and a flat top.

The nearby band rotunda is constructed of timber with a corrugated iron pavilion style roof topped by a finial. It is octagonal in shape and is raised on high stumps. It is accessed by a staircase on one side and a simple timber balustrade spans between iron columns which are located at each point of the octagon. There are acroteria at each corner.

== Heritage listing ==
Apple Tree Creek War Memorial was listed on the Queensland Heritage Register on 21 October 1992 having satisfied the following criteria.

The place is important in demonstrating the evolution or pattern of Queensland's history.

War memorials are important in demonstrating the pattern of Queensland's history as they are representative of a recurrent theme that involved most communities throughout the state. They provide evidence of an era of widespread Australian patriotism and nationalism, particularly during and following the First World War.

The place has potential to yield information that will contribute to an understanding of Queensland's history.

The war memorial is important as a documentary record of those who volunteered for war service in the Apple Tree Creek area as other records are generally organised by name or unit, making it difficult to determine the origin of individuals.

The place is important in demonstrating the principal characteristics of a particular class of cultural places.

It is also a demonstration of popular taste in the inter-war period.

Unveiled in 1921, the memorial at Apple Tree Creek demonstrates the principal characteristics of a commemorative structure erected as an enduring record of a major historical event. This is achieved through the appropriate use of various symbolic elements including columns and flags.

The place is important because of its aesthetic significance.

It is of aesthetic significance both for its high level of workmanship and design and as a complementary structure within the park setting.

The place has a strong or special association with a particular community or cultural group for social, cultural or spiritual reasons.

The memorial has a strong association with the community as evidence of a major historic event which had a personal impact on most families in the district.

The place has a special association with the life or work of a particular person, group or organisation of importance in Queensland's history.

It also has special association with monumental mason A L Petrie as an example of his work.
