= Redridge, Queensland =

Redridge
- Suburb
- Interactive map of Redridge
- Coordinates: 25.1666°S 152.3500°E
- Country: Australia
- State: Queensland
- LGA: Bundaberg Region
- Location: 10.2 km (6.3 mi) NNE of Childers; 45.1 km (28.0 mi) S of Bundaberg CBD; 64.6 km (40.1 mi) WNW of Hervey Bay; 316 km (196 mi) N of Brisbane

Government
  - State electorate: Burnett
  - Federal division: Hinkler

Area
  - Total: 69.6 km^{2} (26.9 sq mi)

Population
  - Total: 711 (2021 census)
  - Density: 10.216/km^{2} (26.46/sq mi)
- Time zone: UTC+10:00 (AEST)
- Postcode: 4660
Suburbs around Redridge
Farnsfield	Goodwood	Goodwood
North Isis	Redridge	Buxton
Abington	Abington	Isis River

Redridge is a rural locality in the Bundaberg Region, Queensland, Australia. In the 2021 census, Redridge had a population of 711 people.

== Geography ==
The Gregory River forms the north-eastern boundary of the locality, while Stockyard Creek forms the southern and south-eastern boundaries.

The Goodwood Road passes through the locality from the west (North Isis) to north-east (Goodwood).

A cane tramway enters the locality from the north-west (Farnsfield) and extends towards the south-east of the locality and terminates there. It provides a means to transport harvested sugarcane to the Isis Central sugar mill.

Although most of the land is used for a variety of crop growing (including sugarcane), there is some residential development in the south-west of the locality, mostly rural residential acreage blocks.

== Demographics ==
In the 2016 census, Redridge had a population of 628 people.

In the 2021 census, Redridge had a population of 711 people.

== Education ==
There are no schools in Redridge. The nearest government primary schools are in Goodwood State School in neighbouring Goodwood to the north-east and Childers State School in Childers to the south-west. The nearest government secondary school is Isis District State High School in Childers. There is also a Catholic primary school in Childers.
