= Howard railway station =

Railway station in Queensland, Australia

Howard
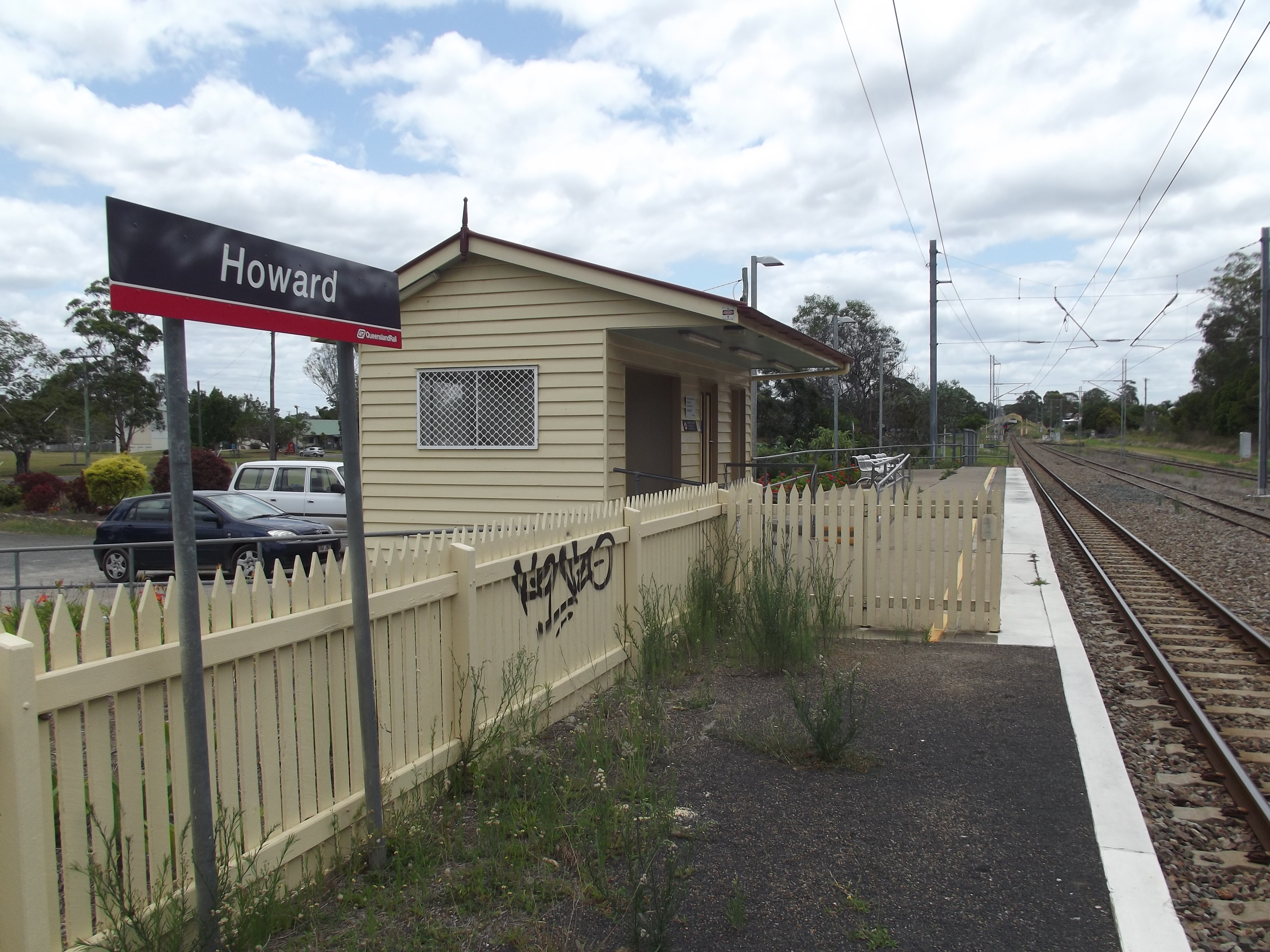
- Station in November 2012

General information
- Location: Steley Street, Howard
- Coordinates: 25.3176°S 152.5636°E
- Owner: Queensland Rail
- Operator: Traveltrain
- Line: North Coast
- Platforms: 1
- Tracks: 2

Construction
- Structure type: Ground
- Accessible: Yes

History
- Opened: 1883

Services
| Preceding station | Queensland Rail | Following station |
|---|---|---|
| Maryborough West towards Brisbane | Spirit of Queensland | Bundaberg towards Cairns |
| Maryborough West towards Brisbane | Tilt Train | Bundaberg towards Rockhampton |
Former services
| Thabeban towards Brisbane | North Coast line | Goodwood towards Cairns |
Location

Howard railway station is located on the North Coast line in the Fraser Coast Region of Queensland, Australia. It serves the town of Howard.

== History ==
Howard station opened in 1883 to service the nearby colliery. The station has a wooden waiting shelter. Opposite the platform lies a passing loop.

== Services ==
Howard is served by long-distance Traveltrain Tilt Train services to Rockhampton and Spirit of Queensland services to Cairns.
