= Kinkuna railway station =

Former railway station in Queensland, Australia

Kinkuna

General information
- Location: unnamed road between Foleys and Dellers Road, Kinkuna, Queensland (access from Goodwood Road)
- Coordinates: 25°03′14″S 152°23′46″E
- Line: North Coast Line
- Connections: no connections

Services
Preceding station	Queensland Rail	Following station
Goodwood towards Brisbane	North Coast line	Coonarr towards Cairns
Location

Kinkuna railway station is a railway station on the North Coast railway line, Queensland, Australia.
