= Childers Post Office =

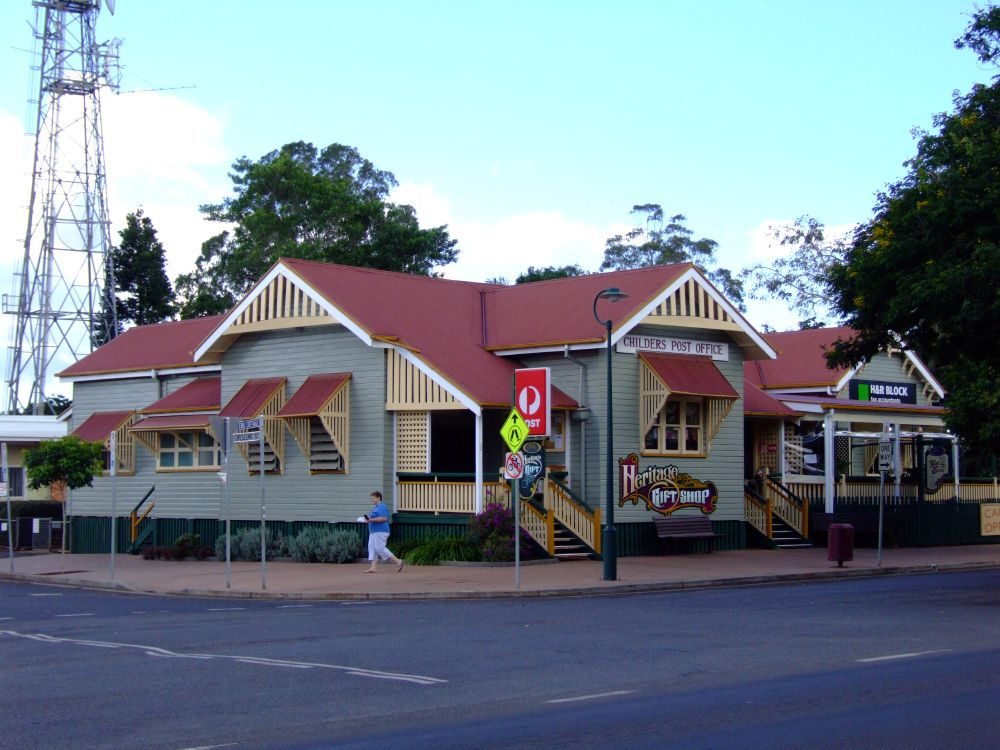
- Childers Post Office, 2008

- Location within Queensland Location within Australia
- 25.2361°S 152.2783°E
- Location: Bruce Highway, Childers, Bundaberg Region, Queensland, Australia

History
- Design period: 1870s–1890s (late 19th century)
- Built: 1890–1910

Site notes
- Architect: Queensland Colonial Architect's Office

Queensland Heritage Register
- Official name: Childers Post Office (former), Childers Heritage Shop
- Type: state heritage (built)
- Designated: 24 January 2003
- Reference no.: 600619
- Significant period: 1890s–1910s (fabric); 1890s–1990s (historical, social)
- Significant components: post & telegraph office, residential accommodation – post master's house/quarters

Childers Post Office is a heritage-listed former post office at Bruce Highway, Childers, Bundaberg Region, Queensland, Australia. It was designed by Queensland Colonial Architect's Office and built from 1890 to 1910. It is also known as Childers Heritage Shop. It was added to the Queensland Heritage Register on 24 January 2003.

== History ==
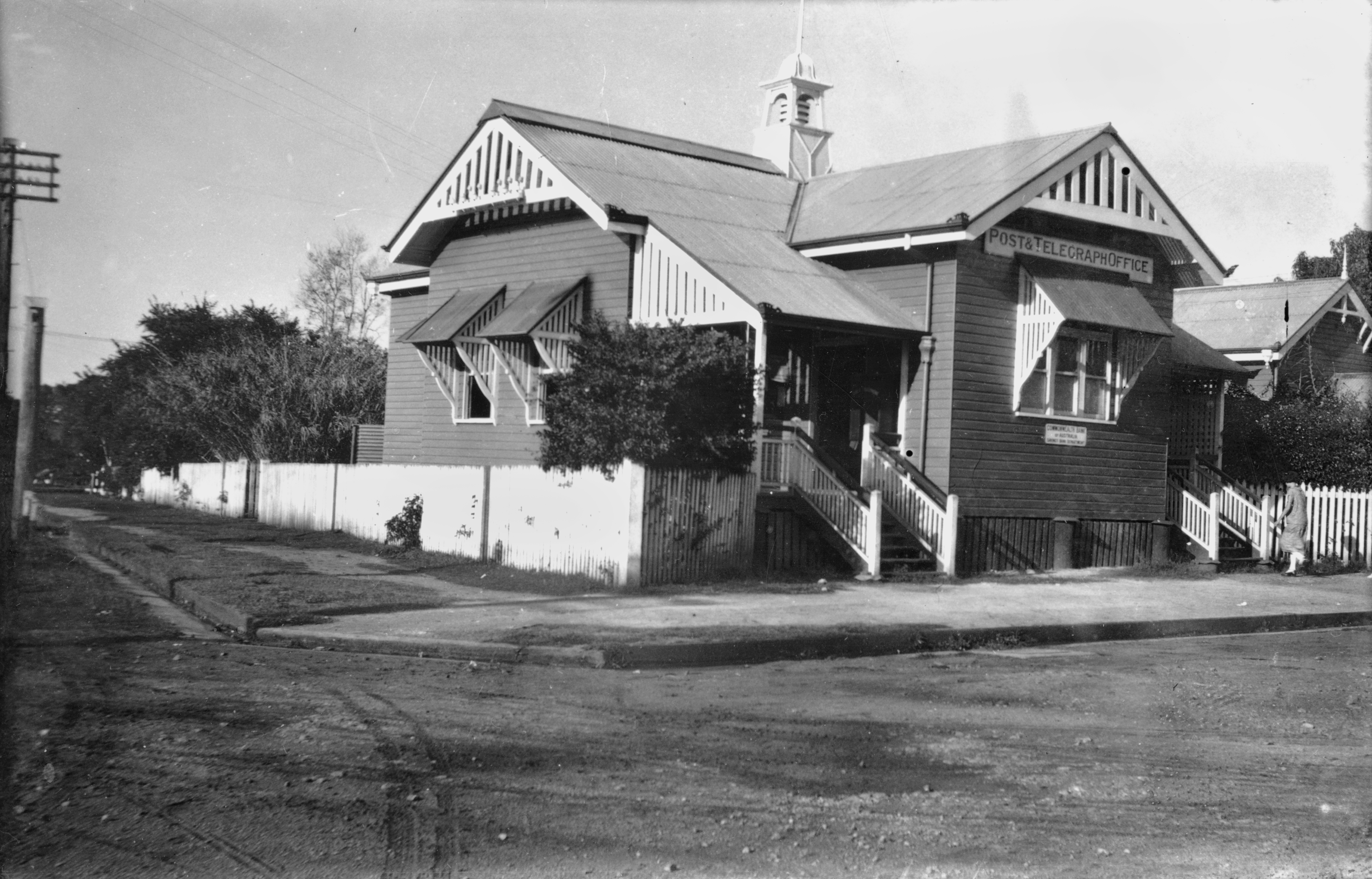
Childers Post & Telegraph Office, circa 1930

The Childers Post Office is a timber post office situated on a corner block on the northern side of Childers' main street opposite the Court House. It was built to a standard government design in 1890 and substantially extended by the Queensland Government Architect's Office in 1910, reflecting the growth of Childers and Commonwealth policy to improve the postal facilities of towns associated with agricultural and pastoral expansion. Currently the building operates as a gift shop but continues to provide post office services.

Following logging of the dense Isis Scrub in the 1870s, Childers, in the heart of the Scrub, was promoted in the 1880s by Maryborough interests, as an agricultural district. The land in the immediate vicinity of the present town of Childers was surveyed in 1882 into 50-acre (20 ha) farm blocks. There was no official town survey; Childers developed following the private subdivision at the railhead of the 1887 Isis railway line from Isis Junction. This was opened on 31 October 1887, and was intended principally to facilitate the transport of timber from the scrub.

The coming of the railway not only promoted the development of the town of Childers; it also proved the catalyst for the establishment of a sugar industry in the district in the late 1880s. At the opening of the railway to Childers, Robert Cran, owner of Maryborough's Yengarie mill, announced that he would erect a double crushing juice mill at Doolbi, to supply his mill at Yengarie. This was completed in 1890, with the juice being brought in railway tankers from the Isis. Further expansion of the sugar industry in the Isis was closely related to the activities of the Colonial Sugar Refining Company, which erected a central crushing mill in the district 1893–94, and began crushing in 1895. By 1895, at least three other mills had been established in the Isis, with another two under construction, and Childers had emerged as the flourishing centre of a substantial sugar-growing district.

A Post Office first opened in Childers in 1887. In 1890 a purpose built building was constructed and opened on 17 September 1890. It carried on both the post and telegraph office business as well as providing residential accommodation for the post master which was clearly separated from the business part of the building by a picket fence surrounding the front garden. In January 1894, the telegraph office was relocated to the newly opened Childers railway station. The quarters were housed in a standard T11 form and the offices in an adjoining double gabled section on the corner. The T11 post office type was a porch and gable style developed during the 1880s and used outside major towns. The form was developed further during 1900 to 1940 and is typical of many post offices of the period. There are only a few examples left of the 19th century form.

Although in 1901 the Commonwealth Post Master General's Department was created, transfer of responsibility from the colonies to new organisations was gradual. The new Commonwealth administration upgraded buildings and facilities in towns associated with agricultural and pastoral expansion. New post offices were built in some towns and others had facilities upgraded. In 1910, major additions were made to the Childers Post Office. The section of the building used as a post office was modified to a form identified by the 1983 National Estate study of post offices as a type T17 with a twin porch, gable and lantern, a form that became one of the most readily identifiable post office styles. It was architecturally important not only for the forms which developed from it in the 1920s and 30s, but for its visual appeal and the quality of construction and detail with which it was carried out.

In 1971, a new telephone exchange and trunk line building was erected to take place of the existing manual exchange and provide automatic trunk line switching facilities to surrounding district exchanges. A building to house this was erected on site adjoining the Post Office with access from Crescent Street and there are easements between the two sites. In 1994 the building was sold into private ownership and now operates as the Childers Heritage Shop although some post office services are also continued. In 1999 alterations were carried out to allow the operation of a coffee shop in a former bedroom by opening the verandah on the residence and creating a roof deck section between the verandah and eastern porch of the post office. Paving and landscaping were also carried out to a forecourt area.

== Description ==
The Childers Post Office is located on the corner of Crescent Street and Churchill Street (Childers' main street), opposite the court house. It is a single storey timber building set on low stumps with a corrugated iron roof and comprises two sections: the former residence in an earlier building to the east, and the post office proper.

The former residential quarters is situated to the east of the post office and in line with it. There is a projecting bay on the eastern side with a gabled roof and a verandah runs along the front of the residence in line with this. The front wall of a former bedroom opening onto this verandah has been opened onto the verandah to provide for a coffee shop. The post office section is on the corner and is accessed by one of two porches sitting to either side of a projecting gable and reached by timber stairs with timber balustrading. The eastern porch is now linked to the residence by a deck. The windows are shaded by sun hoods on timber brackets.

== Heritage listing ==
The Childers Post Office was listed on the Queensland Heritage Register on 24 January 2003 having satisfied the following criteria.

The place is important in demonstrating the evolution or pattern of Queensland's history.

The former Post Office is important in illustrating the pattern of Queensland history, being a government facility erected during a period of unprecedented growth in the Isis, when Childers was emerging as the centre of a substantial sugar-growing district. It was substantially extended during the period before the First World War when the new Commonwealth government made a policy of upgrading postal services to developing agricultural and pastoral communities.

The place demonstrates rare, uncommon or endangered aspects of Queensland's cultural heritage.

The earliest section has been identified by a post office study as being one of the few of its type remaining.

The place is important in demonstrating the principal characteristics of a particular class of cultural places.

The post office building includes examples of two standard post office types developed by the Government Architect's Office during a period when a high quality of design and finish was achieved.

The place is important because of its aesthetic significance.

The post office, in its scale, form and materials, makes a major contribution to townscape of Childers.
