= Isis Central Sugar Mill =

Coordinates: 25.1954°S 152.2088°E

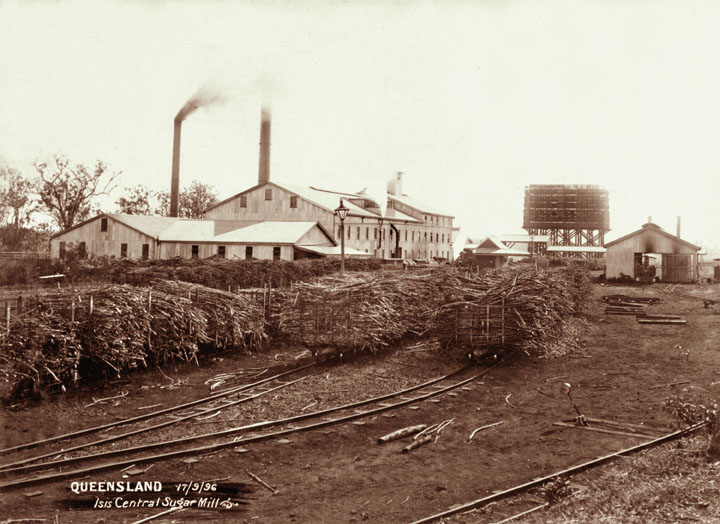
- Isis Central Sugar Mill with cane and canetrucks, 17 September 1896
- Company type: Private company
- Industry: Sugar Processing and Farming
- Headquarters: Isis Central, Queensland, Australia
- Products: Raw sugar, molasses and electricity
- Revenue: ▲ A$90,000,000 (2014)
- Website: http://www.isissugar.com.au/

Isis Central Sugar Mill is a sugar cane mill at Kevin Livingstone Drive, Isis Central, Bundaberg Region of Queensland, Australia. Isis Central Sugar Mill produces raw sugar, molasses and electricity.

== History ==
Isis Sugar Central Mill was founded in 1896 as an alternative to other sugar mills in the region operated by CSR Limited. Isis was founded as a company limited by guarantee and remains wholly owned by its shareholders, which is limited to farmers who supply sugar cane to the mill.

In 2012 the mill had its largest ever season, with 1,505,400 tonnes of cane crushed in a single season for the production of 223,874 tonnes of raw sugar.

In 2019 the mill owners had approve a proposal from a Pakistani group called Almoiz, in which Almoiz was to hold a majority of the shares in the mill and was to invest $35 million for upgrades of the mill. By 3 August 2020 Almoiz group had been unable to get the backing of the Bank of Pakistan, so the deal did not proceed.

== See also ==
- CSR Limited
- List of sugar mills in Queensland
- Chelsea Sugar Refinery
- List of tramways in Queensland
