= Isis Central, Queensland =

Isis Central
- Suburb
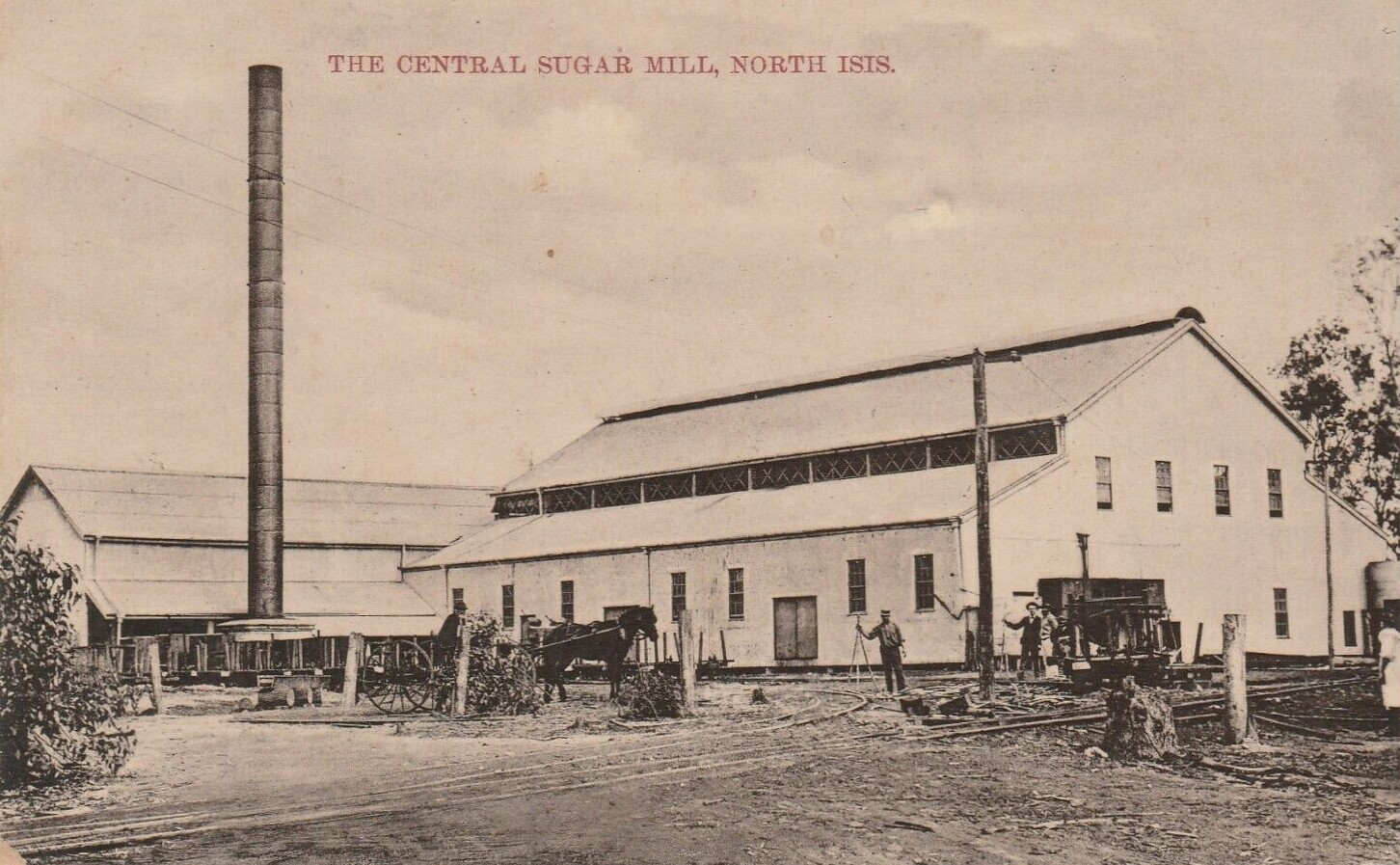
- Isis Central Sugar Mill, early 1900s

- Interactive map of Isis Central
- Coordinates: 25.1955°S 152.1830°E
- Country: Australia
- State: Queensland
- LGA: Bundaberg Region
- Location: 13.0 km (8.1 mi) NE of Childers; 48.6 km (30.2 mi) SW of Bundaberg CBD; 331 km (206 mi) N of Brisbane

Government
  - State electorate: Burnett
  - Federal division: Hinkler

Area
  - Total: 43.2 km^{2} (16.7 sq mi)

Population
  - Total: 205 (2021 census)
  - Density: 4.745/km^{2} (12.29/sq mi)
- Time zone: UTC+10:00 (AEST)
- Postcode: 4660
Suburbs around Isis Central
Booyal	Booyal	Cordalba
Booyal	Isis Central	North Isis
Eureka	Eureka	Apple Tree Creek

Isis Central is a rural locality in the Bundaberg Region, Queensland, Australia. In the 2021 census, Isis Central had a population of 205 people.

== History ==
The locality takes its name from the Isis River, which in turn was named by mine owner William Howard who lived in the area from 1862. Howard named it after the Isis River in England, a tributary of the River Thames.

In 1894, local sugarcane growers decided to raise funds to build the Isis Central Sugar Mill. The Queensland Government approved the construction of the mill, costing £26,000 and Walkers Limited were engaged to build the mill. The first crushing began on Tuesday 7 September 1897.

Isis Central Mill Provisional School opened on 23 January 1899. It became Isis Central Mill State School on 1 January 1909. It closed on 11 December 1987. It was on the north-eastern corner of Kevin Livingstone Drive and Madsens Road (25.19540°S 152.20151°E).

== Demographics ==
In the 2016 census, Isis Central had a population of 216 people.

In the 2021 census, Isis Central had a population of 205 people.

== Heritage listings ==
There are a number of heritage-listed sites in Isis Central, including:

- 721 Adies Road (25.1988°S 152.1910°E): Adie's House and Site

== Education ==
There are no schools in Isis Central. The nearest government primary schools are Cordalba State School in neighbouring Cordalba to the north-east and Booyal State School in neighbouring Booyal to the west. The nearest government secondary school is Isis District State High School in Childers to the south-east.
