= Shire of Isis =

Coordinates: 25°14′16.4″S 152°16′37.2″E

- Local government area
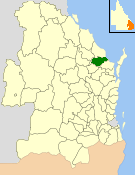
- Location within Queensland

- Country: Australia
- State: Queensland
- Region: Wide Bay–Burnett
- Established: 1887
- Council seat: Childers

Area
  - Total: 1,702.2 km^{2} (657.2 sq mi)

Population
  - Total: 6,298 (2006 census)
  - Density: 3.6999/km^{2} (9.5827/sq mi)
- Website: Shire of Isis
LGAs around Shire of Isis
Kolan	Burnett	Burnett
Kolan	Shire of Isis	Wide Bay
Biggenden	Woocoo	Hervey Bay

The Shire of Isis was a local government area located in the Wide Bay–Burnett region of Queensland, Australia, to the south of Bundaberg. The Shire, administered from the town of Childers covered an area of 1,702.2 square kilometres (657.2 sq mi), and existed as a local government entity from 1887 until 2008, when it was amalgamated with the City of Bundaberg and the Shires of Burnett and Kolan to form the Bundaberg Region.

== History ==
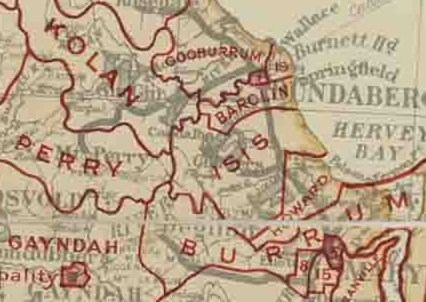
Map of Isis Division and adjacent local government areas, March 1902

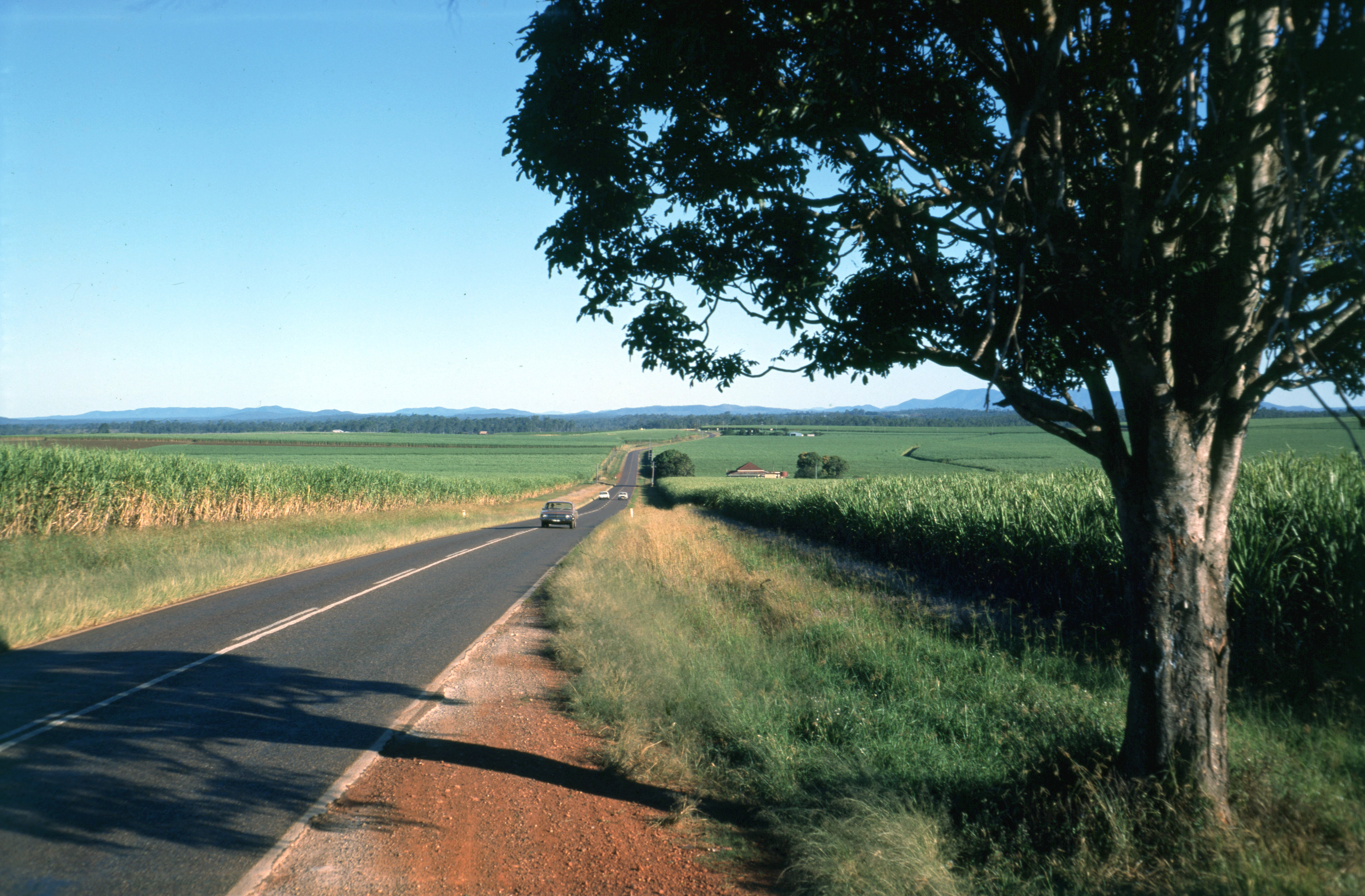
Bruce Highway between Maryborough and Gin Gin within the Shire of Isis, 1976

The Isis Division was established on 1 January 1887 under the Divisional Boards Act 1887, on land previously part of the Burrum Division.

With the passage of the Local Authorities Act 1902, Isis Division became the Shire of Isis on 31 March 1903.

On 15 March 2008, under the Local Government (Reform Implementation) Act 2007 passed by the Parliament of Queensland on 10 August 2007, the Shire of Isis merged with the City of Bundaberg and the Shires of Burnett and Kolan to form the Bundaberg Region.

== Towns and localities ==
The Shire of Isis included the following settlements:

- Childers
- Apple Tree Creek
- Booyal
- Buxton
- Cordalba
- Doolbi
- Farnsfield
- Goodwood
- Horton
- Isis Central
- North Isis
- Redridge
- Woodgate

== Chairmen of the Shire of Isis ==
- 1927–1930 T. Gaydon
- 1930–1939 A. Adie
- 1939–1949 E. P. Noakes
- 1949–1970 F. E. Eastaughffe
- 1970–1988 A.W. Paith

The above dates included multiple terms.

== Population ==
Year	Population
1933	3,778
1947	3,639
1954	4,243
1961	3,951
1966	3,718
1971	3,666
1976	3,926
1981	4,023
1986	4,082
1991	4,825
1996	5,878
2001	6,045
2006	6,663
