= Gregory River, Queensland (Bundaberg Region) =

Gregory River
- Suburb
- Interactive map of Gregory River
- Coordinates: 25.1025°S 152.2136°E
- Country: Australia
- State: Queensland
- LGA: Bundaberg Region
- Location: 18.7 km (11.6 mi) NNW of Childers; 41.1 km (25.5 mi) SW of Bundaberg; 77.6 km (48.2 mi) NW of Hervey Bay; 328 km (204 mi) N of Brisbane

Government
  - State electorate: Burnett
  - Federal division: Hinkler

Area
  - Total: 36.7 km^{2} (14.2 sq mi)

Population
  - Total: 65 (2021 census)
  - Density: 1.771/km^{2} (4.59/sq mi)
- Time zone: UTC+10:00 (AEST)
- Postcode: 4660
Suburbs around Gregory River
| Pine Creek | Elliott | North Gregory |
| Promisedland | Gregory River | Farnsfield |
| Promisedland | Cordalba | North Isis |

Gregory River is a rural locality in the Bundaberg Region, Queensland, Australia. In the 2021 census, Gregory River had a population of 65 people.

== Geography ==
The Gregory River forms the south western boundary of the locality.

== Demographics ==
In the 2016 census, Gregory River had a population of 65 people.

In the 2021 census, Gregory River had a population of 65 people.

== Education ==
There are no schools in Gregory River. The nearest government primary school is Cordalba State School in neighbouring Cordalba to the south. The nearest government secondary school is Isis District State High School in Childers to the south-east.
