= North Isis =

- Suburb
- Interactive map of North Isis
- Coordinates: 25.1733°S 152.2705°E
- Country: Australia
- State: Queensland
- LGA: Bundaberg Region
- Location: 6.6 km (4.1 mi) NNW of Childers; 46.3 km (28.8 mi) SSW of Bundaberg; 65.5 km (40.7 mi) WNW of Hervey Bay; 315 km (196 mi) NNW of Brisbane

Government
  - State electorate: Burnett
  - Federal division: Hinkler

Area
  - Total: 73.8 km^{2} (28.5 sq mi)

Population
  - Total: 566 (2021 census)
  - Density: 7.669/km^{2} (19.864/sq mi)
- Time zone: UTC+10:00 (AEST)
- Postcode: 4660
Suburbs around North Isis
Gregory River	Farnsfield	Farnsfield
Cordalba; Isis Central	North Isis	Redridge; Abington
Apple Tree Creek	Childers	Horton; Doolbi

North Isis is a rural locality in the Bundaberg Region, Queensland, Australia. In the 2021 census, North Isis had a population of 566 people.

== Geography ==
The Bruce Highway touches the south-west boundary of North Isis (but does not enter it). At this point, the Isis Highway splits off and passes through the south-west corner of the locality and then forms the western boundary of the locality.

The land use is predominantly crop growing, mostly sugarcane, with grazing on native vegetation. There is a network of cane tramways in the locality to transport the harvested sugarcane to the local sugar mill.

== History ==
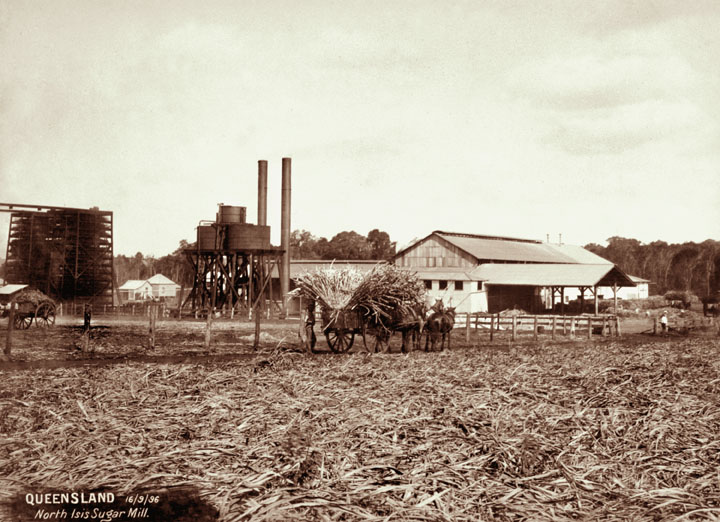
North Isis Sugar Mill, 1896

Isis North Provisional School opened on 29 August 1887. On 1 June 1898 it became Isis North State School. It closed on 13 April 1942. The school was at 350 Knockroe Road (south-west corner with North Isis Road, 25.17169°S 152.25779°E).

In 1893, the Knockroe sugar mill opened on the northern side of Knockroe Road (approx 25.16688°S 152.24962°E). It had ceased circa 1902 after being purchased by CSR and dismantled for re-use at the CSR sugar mill at Huxley.

The Isis railway line was extended from Childers to Cordalba, opening on 1 June 1896, with the following railway stations within this locality (from north to south):

- Hapsburg railway station, renamed Kowbi railway station on 20 October 1916 (25.1786°S 152.2297°E)
- Lynwood railway station (25.1952°S 152.2497°E)
- Huxley railway station (25.2155°S 152.2583°E)

That section of the line closed on 1 July 1964 and all the stations were dismantled.

Whitebridge State School opened in 1915. It closed in 1921. It was at 292 North Isis Road (25.20684°S 152.27653°E).

== Demographics ==
In the 2016 census, North Isis had a population of 533 people.

In the 2021 census, North Isis had a population of 566 people.

== Education ==
There are no schools in North Isis. The nearest government primary schools are Cordalba State School in neighbouring Cordalba to the west and Childers State School in neighbouring Childers to the south. The nearest government secondary school is Isis District State High School, also in Childers.
