= Cordalba =

- Town
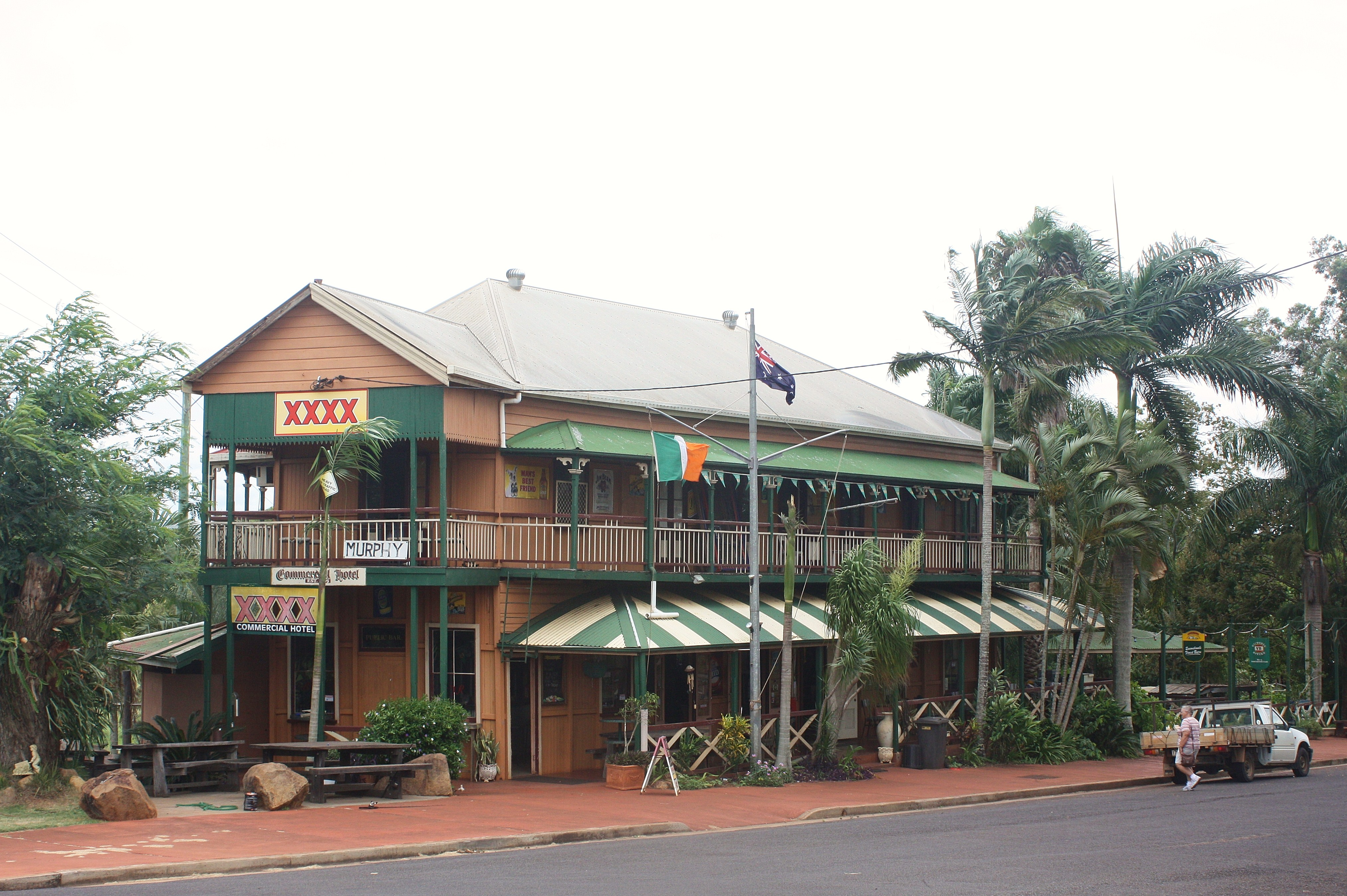
- Commercial Hotel on Queen Street, Cordalba

- Interactive map of Cordalba
- Coordinates: 25.1586°S 152.2125°E
- Country: Australia
- State: Queensland
- LGA: Bundaberg Region
- Location: 14 km (8.7 mi) NW of Childers; 42 km (26 mi) SW of Bundaberg CBD; 327 km (203 mi) N of Brisbane
- Established: 1896

Government
  - State electorate: Burnett
  - Federal division: Hinkler

Area
  - Total: 14.9 km^{2} (5.8 sq mi)

Population
  - Total: 467 (2021 census)
  - Density: 31.34/km^{2} (81.2/sq mi)
- Time zone: UTC+10:00 (AEST)
- Postcode: 4660
Localities around Cordalba
Promisedland	Gregory River	North Isis
Booyal	Cordalba	North Isis
Isis Central	Isis Central	Isis Central

Cordalba is a rural town and locality in the Bundaberg Region, Queensland, Australia. The town was founded in 1896 and played an important role in the sugar workers strike of 1911. In the 2021 census, the locality of Cordalba had a population of 467 people.

== Geography ==
The town is adjacent to the Isis Highway, 327 kilometres (203 mi) from the state capital, Brisbane and 42 kilometres (26 mi) south west of the regional centre of Bundaberg.

The Loggers Creek runs through the township which is situated next to the Cordalba State Forest. With rugged hills of open eucalypt woodland, this state forest protects several species such as possums and gliders which are nocturnal. It provides activities include many mountain biking and walking trails and birdwatching during the day.

=== Climate ===
Cordalba has a subtropical climate with wet, hot summers and mild winters.

== History ==
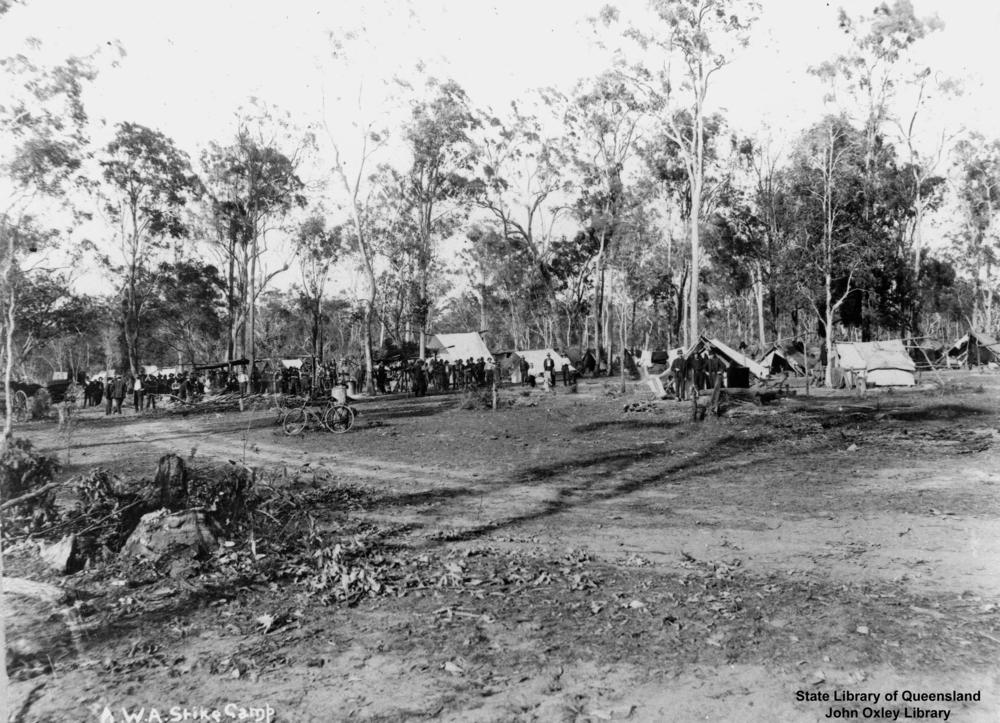
Workers gather at the Cordalba camp site near Maryborough during the Sugar Workers strike of 1911. Workers wanted an eight-hour day and higher wages. Tents appear in the background.

The original inhabitants of the area were the Kabi (or Kabi Kabi) tribe of aboriginal people living a traditional lifestyle focused on native foods of the area, and fishing in nearby streams, rivers and the sea. Their legacy can be seen in the name "Cordalba" meaning "place of the koalas".

Isis River Provisional School opened in 1881. In 1893 it was renamed Abingdon Provisional School. On 22 January 1894 it was renamed Cordalba Provisional School. On 24 January 1901 it became Cordalba State School.

In 1895, Charles Holmes opened the first Cordalba Hotel.

The town played an important role in the sugar workers strike of 1911.

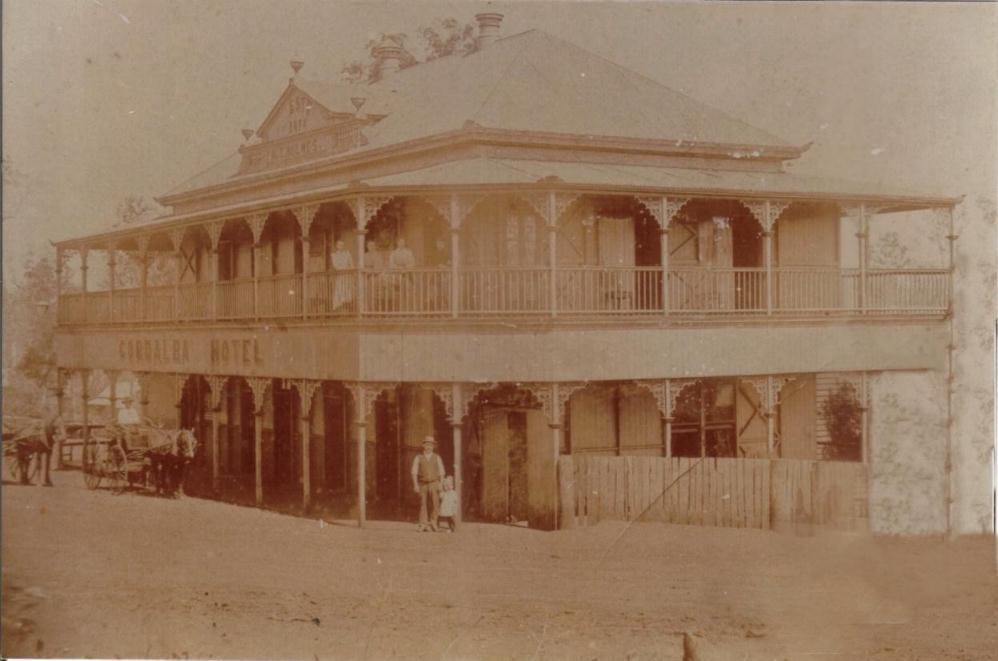
Cordalba Hotel with owner/builder Charles Holmes standing out front with his youngest daughter, and 3 older daughters on the upstairs verandah

In the colonial period the great impetus for growth in local agriculture came with the arrival of the railway line in Cordalba in 1896 from the main Childers line. The township functioned as the main Queensland Railways depot and interchange station between 1896 and 1964, an old railway goods shed being a reminder of those days.

Cordalba Post Office opened on 25 November 1896 (a receiving office had been open from 1893) and closed in 1981.

St Saviour's Anglican Church was dedicated on 13 March 1898 by Bishop William Webber. It closed circa 1988.

The town used to be in the Shire of Isis.

The commercial Hotel is famous for its former proprietress Maude Sheehan. Much like the Young and Jackson Hotel in Melbourne and its famous nude artwork "Chloe", the Commercial Hotel in Cordalba also has a nude painting hanging over the public bar. When fully clothed, the model, Maude Sheehan, once actually ran the place. Maude was amply built and famous for her fiery red hair, which matched an easily aroused temper. Legend has it that on one occasion Maude kicked off a troublemaker, who returned the following day, this time riding his horse into the bar. Incensed at the intrusion, Maude punched the horse between the eyes, bringing both horse and rider to the floor. Maude's nude portrait hangs alongside a rare early Marilyn Monroe poster which was retrieved from the town's rubbish dump.

In the 1970s, Cordalba had seven pubs, prior to a 'spate of bad luck' with fire.

== Demographics ==
In the 2016 census, the locality of Cordalba had a population of 445 people.

In the 2021 census, the locality of Cordalba had a population of 467 people.

== Education ==
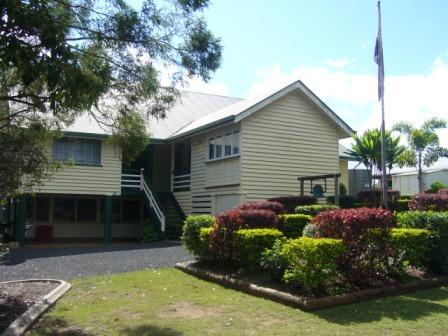
Cordalba State School

Cordalba State School is a government primary (Prep–6) school for boys and girls at 6 John Street, corner of Cemetery Road (25.1587°S 152.2121°E). In 2017, the school had an enrolment of 69 students with 5 teachers (4 full-time equivalent) and 8 non-teaching staff (4 full-time equivalent).

There are no secondary schools in Cordalba. The nearest government secondary school is Isis District State High School in Childers to the south-west.

== Attractions ==
- The Commercial Hotel
- Mango Tree Church, on Hodges Road
- Cordalba State Forest
- Cordalba General Store

== See also ==
- List of tramways in Queensland
