= Saltwood, Shorncliffe =

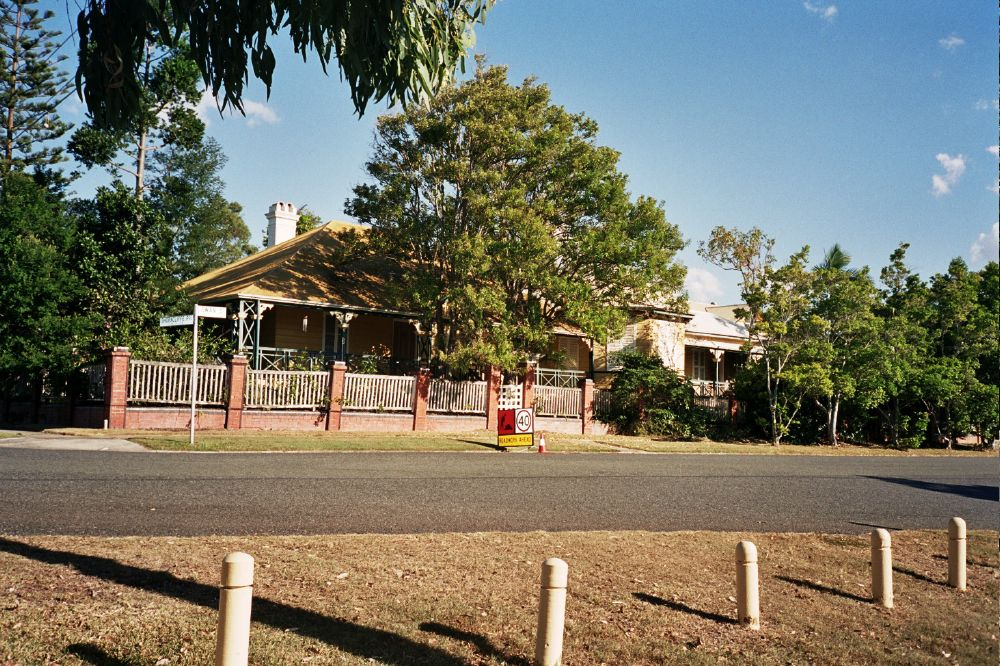
- Saltwood, 2006

- Location within Queensland Location within Australia
- 27.3255°S 153.086°E
- Location: 154 Shorncliffe Parade, Shorncliffe, City of Brisbane, Queensland, Australia

History
- Design period: 1870s–1890s (late 19th century)
- Built: 1870s–1930s circa

Queensland Heritage Register
- Official name: Saltwood
- Type: state heritage (landscape, built)
- Designated: 9 July 1993
- Reference no.: 600291
- Significant period: 1870s–1890s (historical); 1870s–1880s, 1920s–1930s (fabric)
- Significant components: residential accommodation – main house, views from, gate – entrance, fence/wall – perimeter, tennis court, trees/plantings, views to

Saltwood is a heritage-listed holiday home at 154 Shorncliffe Parade, Shorncliffe, City of Brisbane, Queensland, Australia. It was built from 1870s to 1930s circa. It was added to the Queensland Heritage Register on 9 July 1993.

== History ==
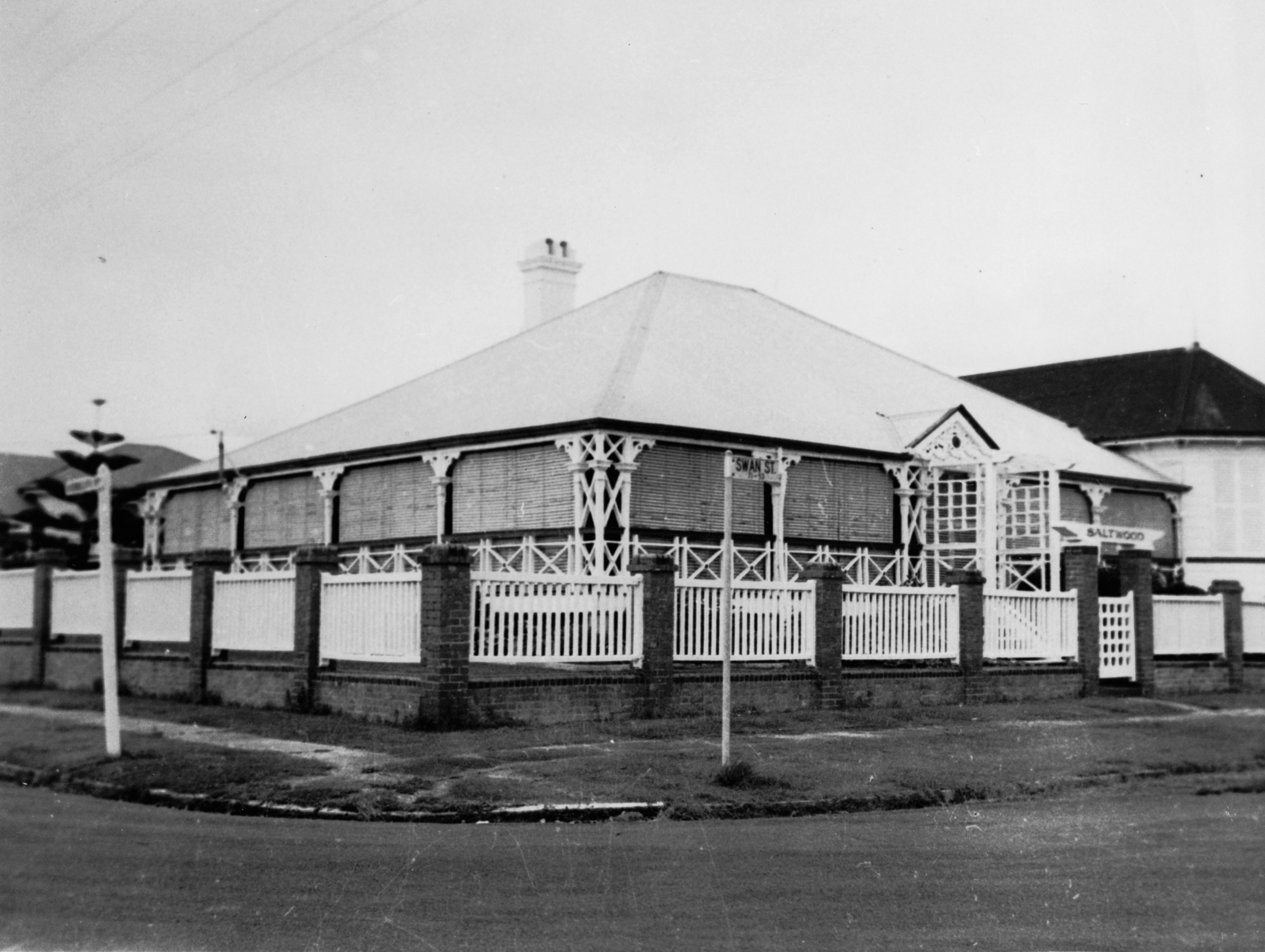
Saltwood, circa 1940

This sprawling, single-storeyed timber residence was constructed apparently in several stages during the 1870s and 1880s, as a holiday residence for the Hart and Drury families.

Sandgate/Shorncliffe began development in the 1860s, particularly for those who could afford private transport and holiday residences. With the extension of the railway from Brisbane to Sandgate in 1882, the permanent population grew, and weekend holiday-makers turned the township into a bustling seaside resort.

The Saltwood site was first alienated from the crown in 1854 by William Sheehan of Brisbane, as a 2 rood allotment. In 1867 it was subdivided into five blocks, and in January 1874 the four which fronted Shorncliffe (Parade) were acquired by Graham Lloyd Hart of Greylands, a prominent Brisbane solicitor. The first section of the building was erected probably for Hart in the mid to late 1870s, as a seaside holiday residence. A transverse section along the western side, and two rear wings, was constructed probably at a later date, possibly in the 1880s, although the southern wing may have been the original detached service wing.

Although Edward Robert Drury, general manager of the Queensland National Bank, did not acquire Saltwood until 1895, he and his family appear to have shared the house with the Hart family, as a holiday home. As early as 1882, Drury had acquired the fifth subdivision of the original site, fronting Swan Street, and this became part of the Saltwood grounds. A photograph dated c. 1901, shows a separate timber building on the fifth subdivision, which may have been erected soon after Drury's purchase of the site. This building is no longer extant.

Drury died at Saltwood early in 1896, but the residence remained in the Drury family until 1919. It may have functioned as a boarding house or guest house from about 1900.

From 1920 to 1979 the property was owned by the McMenamin family, who used two rooms as a doctor's surgery and locum's room in the late 1960s. During their occupancy, the original picket fence was replaced with the present masonry and timber structure, and by the early 1950s, a tennis court had been created on the lawn to the south of the residence, and the open space between the two rear wings had been covered.

The residence was renovated in the 1980s, and verandahs added to the rear extension after 1986. Most of the present planting dates to the early 1980s.

== Description ==
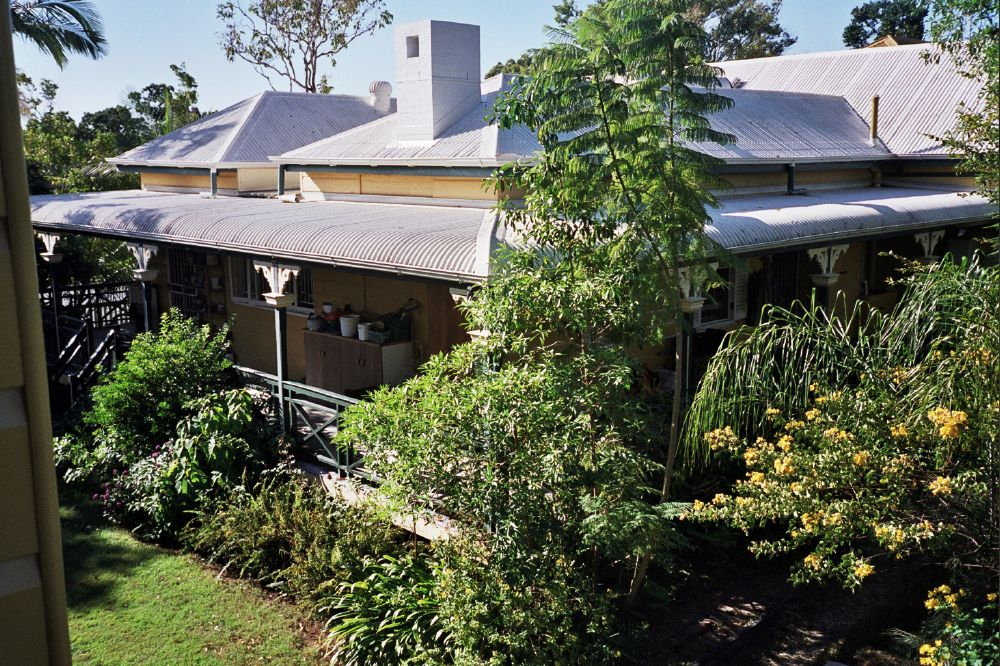
Saltwood, 2006

Saltwood is a single-storeyed chamferboard residence, with a hipped corrugated iron roof, located on the southern corner of Swan Street and Shorncliffe Parade. The building is sited on the crest of a rise opposite Moora park, with views over Moreton Bay and to the islands beyond. The building has concrete stumps and is built close to the corner boundary, with a large lawn to the east.

The earliest northern section of the building has verandahs to three sides, with shaped timber brackets, chamfered posts with capitals, cross-braced balustrade and boarded ceilings. The main entry is from the northwest via a gabled entry with fretwork panel, paired posts and timber louvred doors, and a panelled timber entry door with original hardware. French doors with fanlights and timber shutters open from each room.

The central transverse section consists of two large projecting bays, to the northwest and southeast, surmounted by a timber finial with bracketed eaves, sash windows and shutters.

The southern section has two parallel hipped sections, with a flat roofed section between, surrounded by a recent verandah with a curved corrugated iron awning and timber details to match the earlier section.

Internally, there is a central L-shaped hall, with bedrooms in the northern section and living and dining rooms in the central section. The southern section has been altered and refitted, with a recent kitchen and family room, with two skylight shafts inserted in the hall area. The building has cedar joinery; including a fireplace surround, fretwork ceiling roses and internal doors with fanlights, original door hardware, tongue and groove walls and boarded ceilings. The northern bedroom has a fibrous cement ceiling and a large opening which originally housed four-fold cedar doors, which are currently in storage. The former kitchen has a large fireplace, plaster ceiling, built-in cupboards and sash windows with diamond pattern, lead framed glazing.

The street frontage has a substantial brick pier and timber batten fence, with a gateway on the northwest supporting an overhead beam with the name SALTWOOD.

== Heritage listing ==
Saltwood was listed on the Queensland Heritage Register on 9 July 1993 having satisfied the following criteria.

The place is important in demonstrating the evolution or pattern of Queensland's history.

Saltwood is important in demonstrating the evolution and pattern of development of Sandgate as a holiday resort.

The place demonstrates rare, uncommon or endangered aspects of Queensland's cultural heritage.

Saltwood demonstrates an uncommon aspect of Queensland's cultural heritage, being one of the more intact of the large seaside holiday homes erected in Sandgate in the last half of the 19th century.

The place is important in demonstrating the principal characteristics of a particular class of cultural places.

Saltwood is important in demonstrating the principal characteristics of a substantial, evolving timber holiday home of the 1870s and 1880s, in Brisbane.

The place is important because of its aesthetic significance.

Saltwood is important in exhibiting a range of aesthetic characteristics valued by the Brisbane community, in particular, the building's siting, scale, form and materials, and its contribution to the Shorncliffe Parade and Swan Street streetscapes and Shorncliffe townscape and for the quality of the building's interior, including cedar joinery.

The place has a special association with the life or work of a particular person, group or organisation of importance in Queensland's history.

Saltwood has a special association with the Hart and Drury families, who were prominent in Queensland social, legal, business and government circles in the last quarter of the 19th century.

== Name origins ==
Saltwood is located near Brisbane, between Sandgate and Shorncliffe. The original communities of Saltwood, Sandgate, Shorncliffe, and Seabrook, are four village communities located together on the coast (or within less than a mile of the coast) of Kent, England, in the 3-mile coastal stretch between the larger towns of Folkestone and Hythe.
