= Edward Drury =

Edward Drury may refer to:

- Alfred Drury (Edward Alfred Briscoe Drury; 1856–1944), English sculptor
- Nigel Drury (Edward Nigel Drury; 1911–1984), Australian politician, grandson of the below
- Edward Robert Drury (1832–1896), Australian banker, grandfather of the above
