= Queensland National Bank, Mackay =

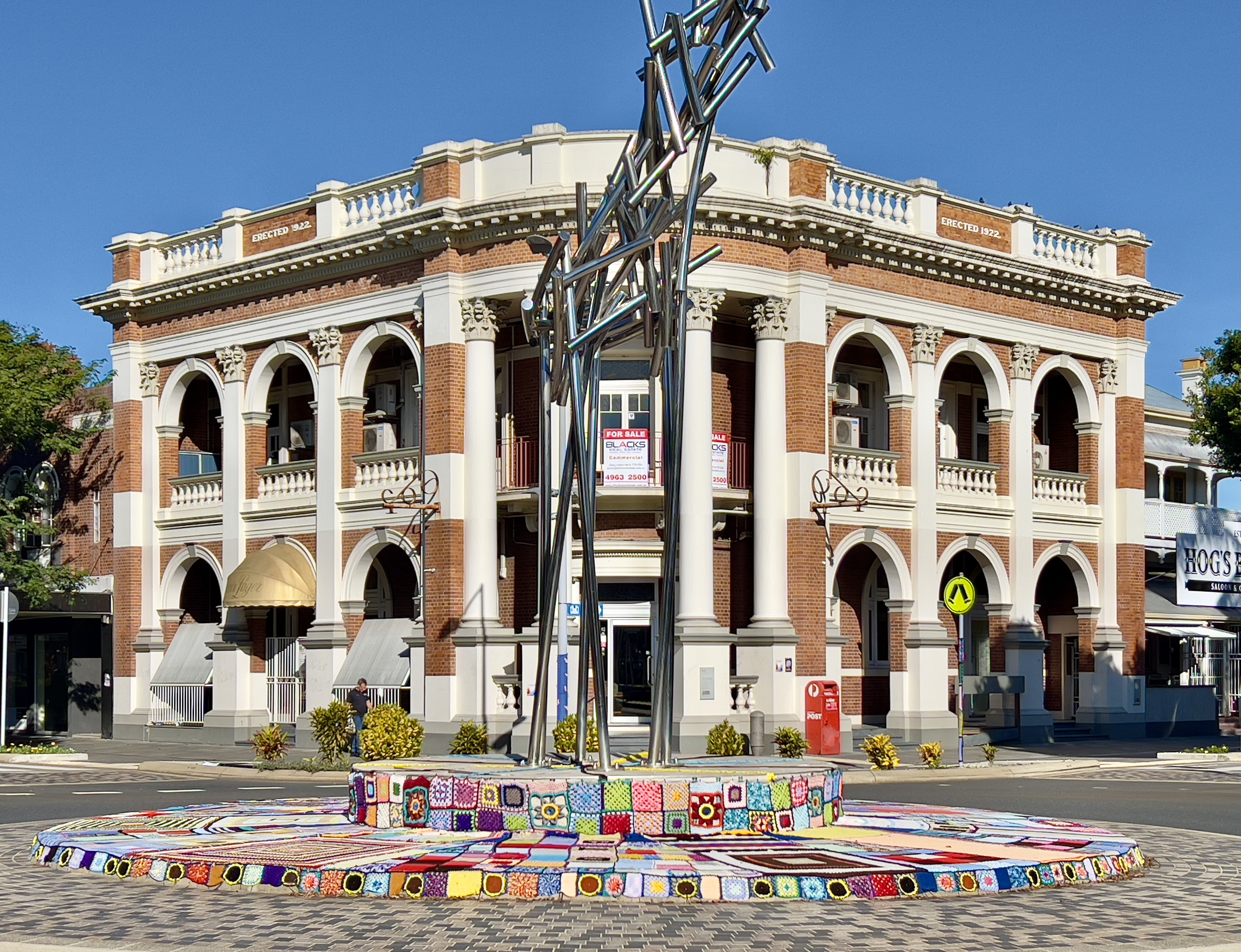
- Former Queensland National Bank, Mackay, 2023

- Location within Queensland Location within Australia
- 21.1415°S 149.1861°E
- Location: 79 Victoria Street, Mackay, Mackay Region, Queensland, Australia

History
- Design period: 1919–1930s (interwar period)
- Built: 1923

Site notes
- Architect: Frederick Herbert Faircloth

Queensland Heritage Register
- Official name: Queensland National Bank and bank residence (former), Hogs Breath Cafe, Metway Building
- Type: state heritage (built)
- Designated: 21 October 1992
- Reference no.: 600672
- Significant period: 1920s (fabric); 1923–1986 (historical use)
- Significant components: banking chamber, residential accommodation – staff housing, strong room
- Builders: William Patrick Guthrie

Queensland National Bank is a heritage-listed former bank building at 79 Victoria Street, Mackay, Mackay Region, Queensland, Australia. It was designed by Frederic Herbert Faircloth and constructed by local builder, William Patrick Guthrie, in 1923. It is also known as Hogs Breath Cafe and Metway Building. It was added to the Queensland Heritage Register on 21 October 1992.

== History ==
The bank and manager's residence were constructed in 1923 for the Queensland National Bank.

The Queensland National Bank was the first and most successful of Queensland's three indigenous 19th century banks. It was established in March 1872 by a group of prominent Queensland squatters, politicians, lawyers, and businessmen who wished to secure development capital free from overseas or inter-colonial control. Its first office was established in Brisbane in that year and the bank attracted widespread Queensland patronage. In 1879 it secured the whole of the Queensland Government's banking business. By 1880 it held 40% of deposits in the colony and dominated the Queensland economy. The Queensland National Banking Company established a branch in Mackay in 1881 in rented premises. The town of Mackay is named for John Mackay who entered the valley of the Pioneer River in 1860 and established a pastoral run there in the following year. In 1862 a settlement was begun on the south bank of the river and by 1863, the township had been surveyed and the first lots of land sold. It was gazetted as a port of entry and a customs house was opened. The town prospered as a port and as a commercial and administrative centre, drawing business from nearby pastoral holdings and the sugar plantations being developed along the river.

Although suffering a devastating cyclone in 1918, Mackay enjoyed a period of substantial growth through the 1920s and 1930s. It was the fastest growing town in Queensland, its population doubling between 1920 and 1940. This was largely because its connection to the North Coast railway line in 1924 improved access to markets and reduced transport costs, thus boosting not only the sugar industry, but also the developing dairy and tourist industries. Local Member and Premier of Queensland, William Forgan Smith, supported the growth of the region and important improvements were made to the infrastructure of the town and harbour. The construction of the new Queensland National Bank premises thus came at a time when Mackay was growing in economic importance in North Queensland.

The building was designed by Frederic Herbert (Herb) Faircloth and constructed by local builder, W Guthrie, at a cost of £15,300. Faircloth was born in Maryborough in 1870 and was a pupil of German- trained Bundaberg architect Anton Hettrich. Faircloth set up his own practice in Bundaberg in 1893 and was very successful, eventually being responsible for the design of almost every major building in Bundaberg. He also made a major contribution to the appearance and character of Childers after a fire devastated the main street in 1902.

In 1948 the National Bank of Australasia absorbed the Queensland National Bank, then in 1983 merged with the Commercial Bank of Australia to form the National Australia Bank. In 1986 the three branches of the National Australia Bank in Mackay were consolidated and this building was sold.

The building deteriorated as several proposals for re-use fell through, then in 1992 it was renovated and adapted in 1992 as commercial premises occupied by Metway Bank and other tenants. A single storey section was added to the front and side of the bank residence as part of the conversion to a Hog's Breath Cafe. There are internal connections between the buildings.

In 2016, the former bank building is occupied by a number of tenants with two cafes on the ground floor while the Hog's Breath Cafe continues to operate in the former residence.

== Description ==
=== The former QN Bank Building ===
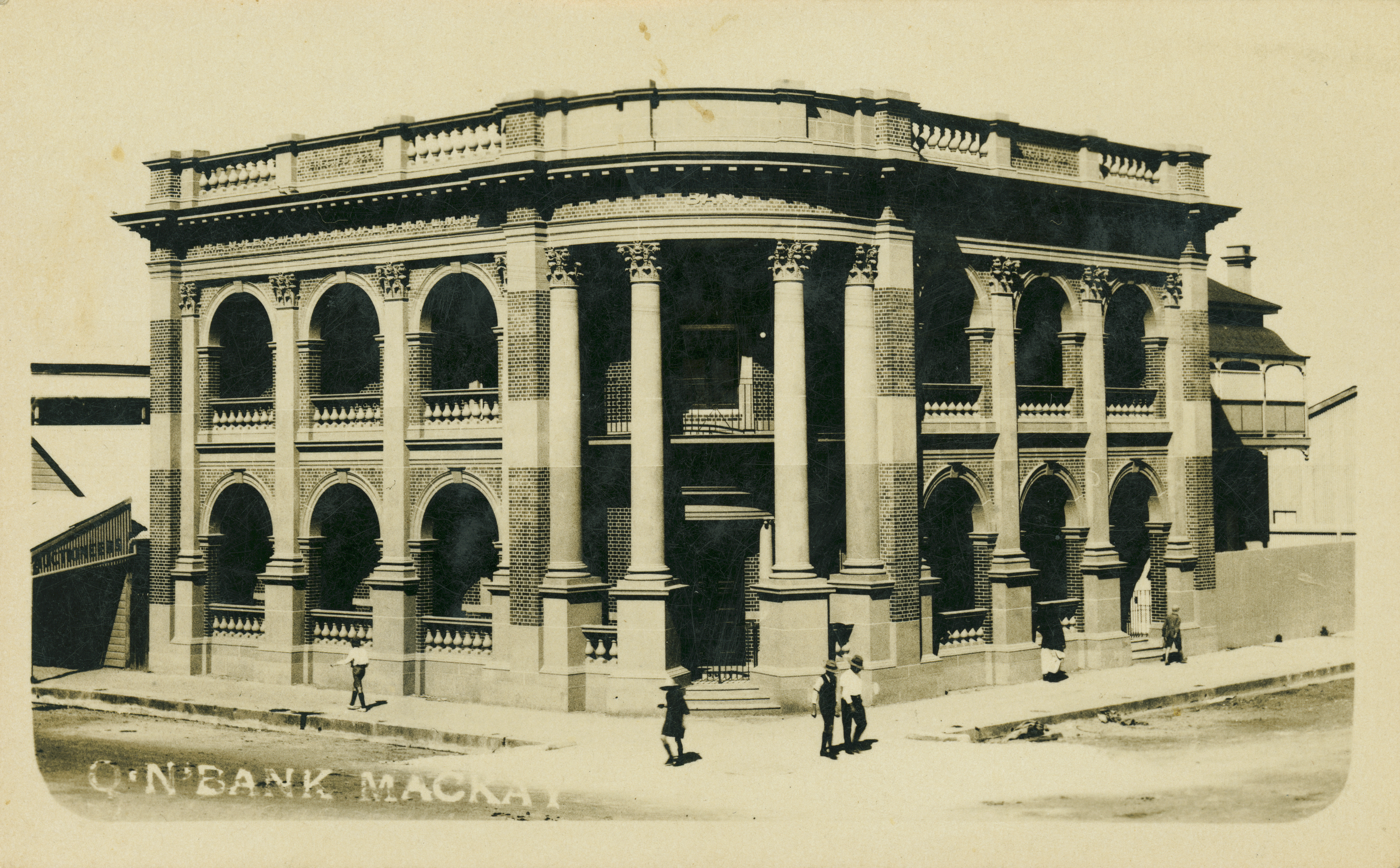
Queensland National Bank, Mackay, 1938

The bank on the corner of Victoria and Woods Streets is of dark face brick with rendered elements and is highly decorated. Though having only two storeys, it is a tall building, with the ground floor raised above pavement level, a lofty ground floor and an upper floor with a deep parapet above it.

The building faces the intersection with two closely matched elevations and a curved corner entrance. Four giant order columns with Corinthian capitals dominate the front; the central two are freestanding and frame the entry; the others are engaged to brick pillars. The main entrance is framed by small columns and has a curved entablature over the lintel. A leadlight window sits over the door, which is now a modern one of glazed aluminium.

On each side of the corner section, a colonnade runs along the street elevation with a narrow arcade behind this, with a matching verandah on the first floor level. Pilasters 2 storeys high with Corinthian capitals, having round arches between at each level, form the colonnade. The ground floor has large arched windows to match, containing leadlight panes in their central part. The windows to the upper storey are rectangular. The verandah is railed with a balustrade of urn shaped masonry elements. This was repeated on the ground floor, but has been partially removed for access. Above an entablature decorated with the completed Roman detailing, the parapet contains matching balustrading. The veranda ceiling is decorative, pressed metal.

The banking chamber has moulded beams running between substantial piers, and pressed metal ceilings.

=== Former Bank Residence ===
The former bank residence is a two-storey building of rendered masonry with a relatively small rectangular plan area. It abuts the rear wall of the bank and is set back a few metres from the street and elevated. The windows are simple rectangles and the hipped roof is clad with corrugated iron and has shallow eaves lined with battens. The rafters are sawn to the profile: the sheets span self-supported out to the edge.

A balcony the full length of the first floor faces Woods Street. This is supported on cantilevered double joists and has turned posts. Moulded boards form a spandrel under the floor line and frieze at the eaves.

The space between the building and the boundary wall at both the front and sides has been filled with the corrugated iron roof of the new cafe extension.

== Heritage listing ==
The former Queensland National Bank and its residence were listed on the Queensland Heritage Register on 21 October 1992 having satisfied the following criteria.

The place is important in demonstrating the evolution or pattern of Queensland's history.

The former Queensland National Bank building and residence is important in illustrating the development of Queensland because it was purpose built as premises for a bank formed to serve Queensland interests and needs when the state was a self-governing colony. The quality of its design and construction also demonstrate the importance of this regional branch at a time when Mackay was the fastest growing town in Queensland.

The place is important in demonstrating the principal characteristics of a particular class of cultural places.

It is important in demonstrating the principal characteristics of a regional bank of its era, from the reassuring conservatism of its classically influenced design to the provision of a residence for the bank manager.

The place is important because of its aesthetic significance.

It has aesthetic value as a prominent and finely detailed building that makes an important contribution to the townscape of Mackay.

The place has a special association with the life or work of a particular person, group or organisation of importance in Queensland's history.

It has a special association with the life and work of important regional architect F H Faircloth. It is also associated with the development of the Queensland National Bank, the earliest of Queensland's indigenous banks.
