= Queensland National Bank, Maryborough =

Historic building in Maryborough, Australia

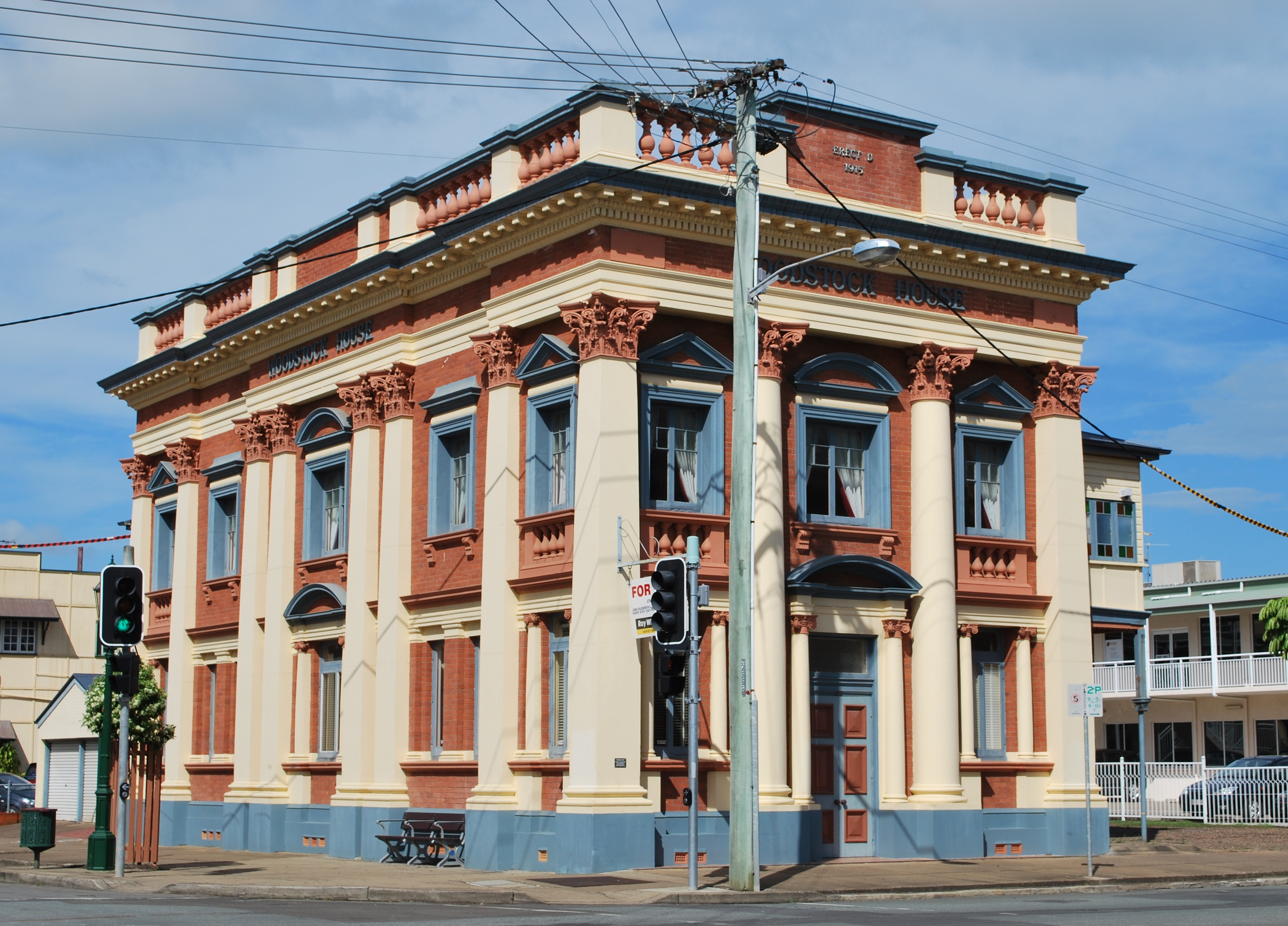
- Former Queensland National Bank, 2008

- Location within Queensland Location within Australia
- 25.5391°S 152.7047°E
- Location: 327 Kent Street, Maryborough, Fraser Coast Region, Queensland, Australia

History
- Design period: 1900–1914 (early 20th century)
- Built: 1914–1915

Site notes
- Architect: Frederic Herbert Faircloth
- Architectural style: Classicism

Queensland Heritage Register
- Official name: Queensland National Bank (former), Burrum Shire Council Chambers, Woodstock House
- Type: state heritage (built)
- Designated: 21 October 1992
- Reference no.: 600694
- Significant period: 1910s (fabric); 1915–1966 (historical banking use); 1966–1976 (Burrum Shire Council use)
- Significant components: residential accommodation – manager's house/quarters, banking chamber, strong room
- Builders: James Treevan, N C Steffensen

Queensland National Bank is a heritage-listed former bank building at 327 Kent Street, Maryborough, Fraser Coast Region, Queensland, Australia. It was designed by Frederic Herbert Faircloth and built from 1914 to 1915 by James Treevan and N C Steffensen. It is also known as Burrum Shire Council Chambers and Woodstock House. It was added to the Queensland Heritage Register on 21 October 1992.

== History ==
The former Queensland National Bank building is a substantial two-storey masonry building designed in a classical revival style. Originally constructed for William Southerden in c.1863 to a design by Brisbane builder, James Treevan, the building was substantially reconstructed for the Queensland National Bank (QNB) in 1914–15 to the design of architect, Frederic Herbert Faircloth.

Settlement at Maryborough commenced in September 1847 when George Furber established a woolstore on the south bank of the Mary River at the head of navigation. He was followed in June 1848 by ET Aldridge and Henry and RE Palmer, who established their own wharves on the opposite riverbank, at a location now known as the original Maryborough town site at Baddow.

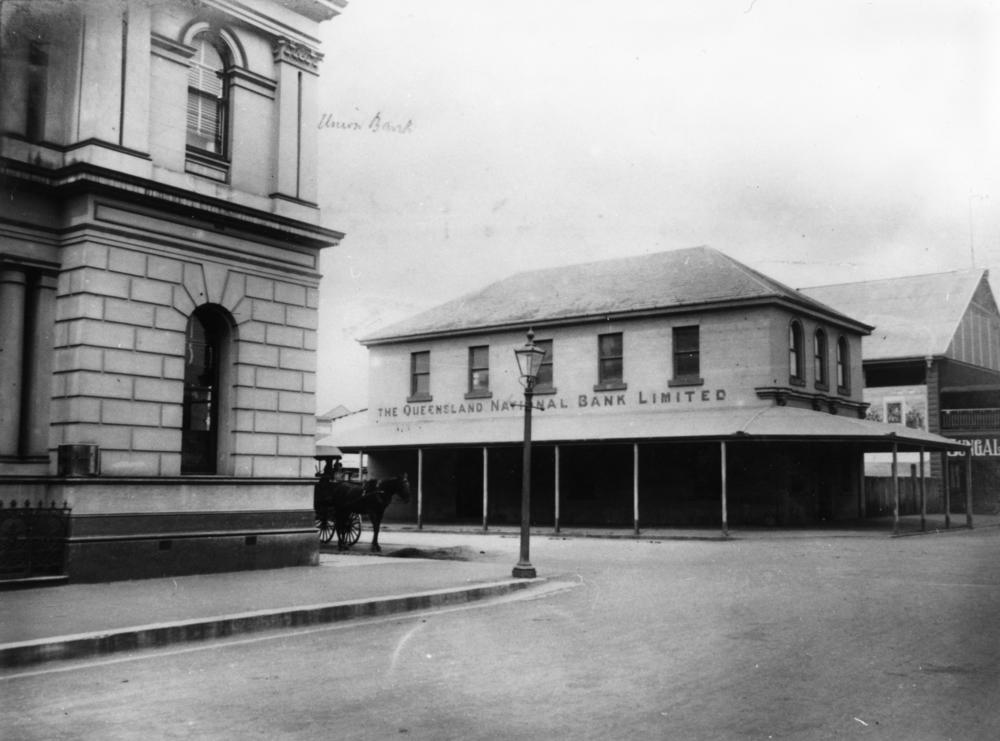
The original building circa 1910 prior to 1914 reconstruction

In 1850 a new town site was surveyed to the east, at a downstream position which provided better access for shipping. The first sale of land at this new site occurred in 1852, but most residents did not shift to the current centre of Maryborough until 1855 and 1856. Maryborough was gazetted a Port of Entry (the Port of Maryborough) in 1859 and was proclaimed a municipality (the Borough of Maryborough) in 1861. During the 1860s and 1870s it flourished as the principal port for the nearby Gympie goldfield and as an outlet for timber and sugar. The establishment of manufacturing plants and primary industries sustained growth in the town into the twentieth century when the QNB building was constructed.

The QNB was the first and most successful of Queensland's three indigenous nineteenth century banks. Established in March 1872 by a prominent and influential group of Queensland squatters, politicians, lawyers, and businessmen anxious to secure development capital free from overseas or intercolonial control, the bank attracted widespread Queensland patronage including in 1879 when it secured all of the Queensland Government's banking business. The bank's first offices were opened in Queen Street, Brisbane in 1872. By the 1880s QNB dominated the colony's economy.

The land on which this former bank stands was originally granted to Edmund Blucher Uhr in 1852. By 1863, the land was in the possession of Maryborough businessman William Southerden. That year, he accepted a tender for £2000 to erect a two-storey brick store covering an area of 60 by 30 feet (18.3 by 9.1 m). The Maryborough Chronicle (9 June 1864) described the building as follows:

"On the ground floor is first, on entering, a large store forty-two by thirty feet (13 m by 9 m); at the back of this a capacious office and private room; on the upper storey, which is reached by an easy flight of stairs, is one large room intended for reserve stock. The appearance of the building from Kent Street is very chaste, and from its loftiness very imposing. The lower part is furnished with two large plate-glass windows, surmounted by a handsome cornice, and above this are three sash windows, each having a single sheet of glass, and on the Richmond Street side five similar windows. The front towards Kent Street is stuccoed."

In 1872, the recently formed QNB acquired the land. However, the bank did not operate from Southerden's former store but initially occupied a small timber building to the rear and then a purpose-built bank (no longer extant) facing Richmond Street. The bank leased the former store on the corner of Richmond and Lennox Streets to Stoward, Bryant and Co. and subsequently a number of other commercial operations before finally moving into the building in 1903.

In 1914, the bank embarked on a substantial reconstruction of the building to the design of FH Faircloth. The Maryborough Chronicle (16 May 1914) reported that the original building would "form the base or skeleton of improvements and alterations that will completely transform the appearance of the old structure ..." A later article (15 June 1915) described the work as "dismantling and re-erection". The reconstructed building occupied the same area as the previous building and the upper-level window openings were located in the same positions.

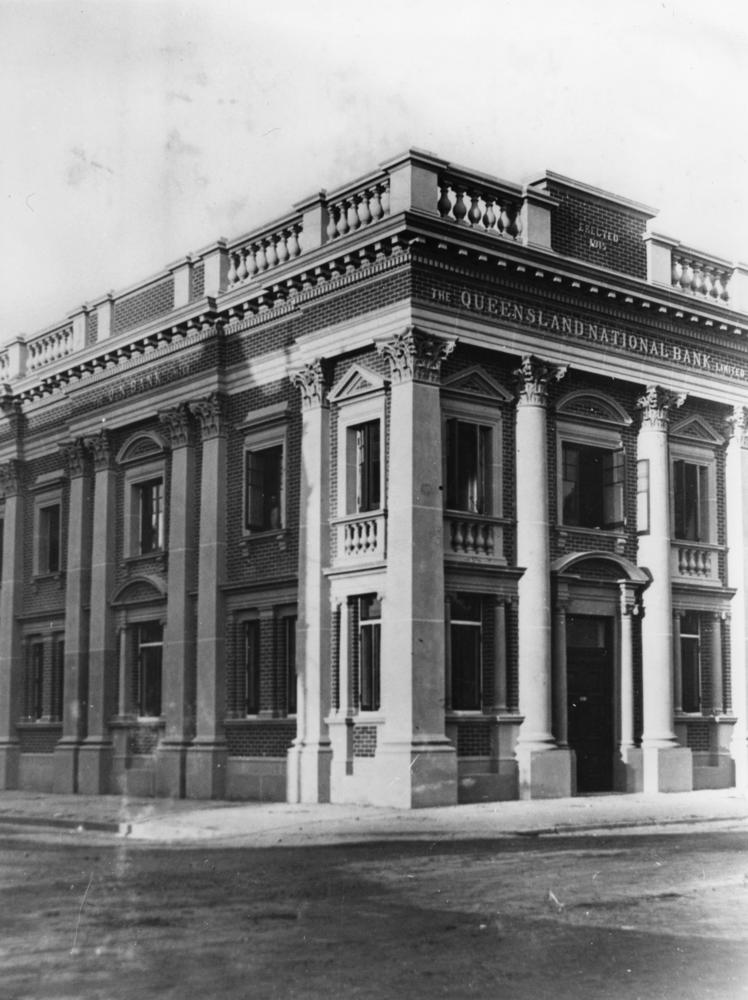
Bank, circa 1916

The Chronicle described the completed building as follows:

"The main building has a frontage of 33 feet (10 m) to the main street, with a depth of 60 feet (18 m) to Richmond Street, all of the work being done in cement on concrete foundations. The bricks used for the street frontages are of a reddish colour with white "tuck" points, while the sandstone coloured entablature, mouldings and embellishments form a fine set off to the effective looking Corinthian columns set on solid pedestals and extending to the full height of the two storeys, the extremities of the columns themselves being surmounted with beautiful entablatures and enriched cornice, further relieved with medallions and mouldings. Artistic effect is given in a lesser order in the Ionic style introduced on the line of the first floor, with small cornice and entablature butting into Corinthian columns and supported by Ionic columns and pilasters. The main entrance is attractively treated with Ionic columns and arched pediments whilst the windows on the first floor are also nicely relieved in fine architectural work. To save space the main entrance doors slide into recesses in the brick. Considerable artistic attention has been given to the general furnishing of the inside of the building, the walls being all finished in King's cement with appropriate colourings and the ceilings of stamped steel with very effective designs. The large banking chamber just inside the main entrance door facing Kent Street, has a length of 42 feet (13 m), and a width of 27 feet (8.2 m). The floor is tile covered, picked out in fine designs, whilst a beautiful semi-circular counter and partitions have been installed, the joinery work having been done by Messrs. James Fairlie and Sons. The effect in the room is enhanced by the antique copper gas pendants fitted up by plumbing sub-contractor, Mr W Wells. On the right hand side of the main door, connected with the banking chamber, is the manager's office, with a door leading therefrom to the chief office further back. Behind the banking chamber are the strong room and stationary room, with a passage leading to the clerks' entrance. On the Bungalow (south eastern) side is the entrance hall and a stairway leading to the upper storey. From the entrance hall access is gained to a large dining hall. The rest of the residential portion of the building is nicely furnished and well laid out with fine balconies on the eastern side and at the back of the premises."

The main contractor was NC Steffensen who had tendered to complete the work at a cost of £2997. The bank moved into the new premises on 14 June 1915.

Frederic Herbert (Herb) Faircloth was born in Maryborough in 1870 and was a pupil of German-trained Bundaberg architect Anton Hettrich. Faircloth set up his own practice in Bundaberg in 1893 and was very successful, eventually being responsible for the design of almost every major building there. He was also to have a major effect on the appearance and character of Childers where he was engaged to design replacement buildings after much of the main street was destroyed by fire in 1902.

In 1919 the block was subdivided and in 1922 the Bank of Queensland, formed in 1917 by an amalgamation of the Bank of North Queensland and the Royal Bank of Queensland, merged with the Queensland National Bank. In 1949 a new title for this property was issued to the National Bank of Australasia following a merger with the Queensland National Bank. These mergers meant that many bank buildings became surplus to requirements and in 1966 this one was sold to the Burrum Shire Council for use as their council chambers.

The Burrum Shire was formed in 1917 by the amalgamation of the Shire of Pialba, part of the City of Maryborough and parts of the Shires of Antigua and Howard. The Burrum Council met at first in the Maryborough Town Hall and then in a number of other Maryborough town venues. A building purpose-built for the council in 1938 was rapidly deteriorating by the early 1960s and alternative accommodation was needed, which prompted their move to the former bank building, which was prestigious in appearance and centrally situated. The Burrum Shire Council was formally decommissioned in 1976 when the building was sold into private ownership and used for office tenancies.

The name Woodstock House, which currently appears on the building's parapet, was given to it in the 1970s when it was purchased by doctors E Dunn and K Pearson for use as a surgery; Woodstock being the name of Dr Dunn's home in Lennox Street at the time. Major restoration work was carried out on the building after 1999 when the bricks were stripped and the columns were painted.

== Description ==
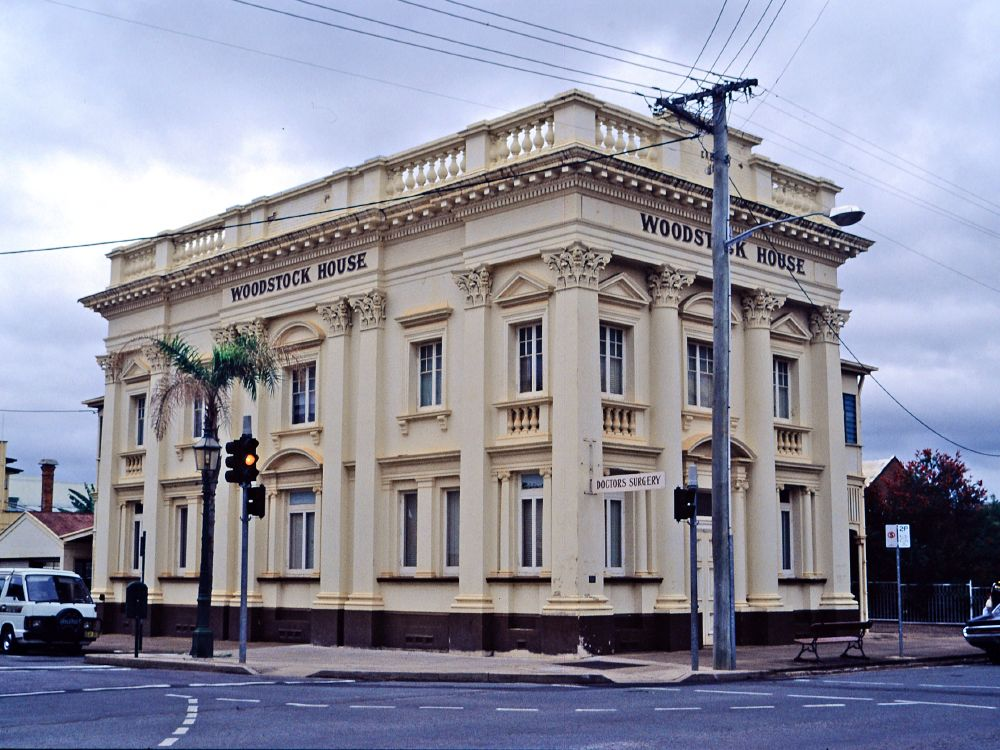
Bank, 1997

Woodstock House is a substantial two storeyed rendered brick building prominently located in the Maryborough town centre at the corner of Kent and Richmond Streets. Principal facades of the building address both streets.

The principal facades of the rectangular planned building are elaborate essays in classical architecture, comprising five bays on the long side, addressing Richmond Street, and three bays to the shorter Kent Street elevation. The bays of the building are defined by double storeyed height pilasters with Corinthian order capitals which are square planned, except those flanking the Kent Street entrance that are round planned. The square planned columns are paired flanking the central Richmond Street bay. The pilasters support a detailed entablature with a projecting cornice with stylised Corinthian order detailing, including dentil mouldings and modillions (or small scrolled bracket giving the impression of supporting another projecting moulded band of the cornice). Surmounting the cornice of the building is an Italianate parapet, formed by a balustrade of elongated urns separated with panels aligned with the pilasters on the face of the building. On the parapet over the two central bays are flat rendered brick panels. The principal entrance to the building, from Kent Street, is through an aedicule or framed opening comprising two columns supporting a round headed pediment. More simple versions of these openings line ground floor in each of the other bays, although the smaller versions do not support a pediment, only an entablature. Above these openings are first floor window openings which are surrounded by architraves. At the corners of the buildings these openings have a blank Italianate balustrade at base level and are surmounted by triangular pediments. The openings in the central bays of each elevation are surmounted by round arched pediments, similar to those in the central bays of the ground floor.

The faces of the building which do not have street frontage are smooth faced and are lined with double storeyed timber framed verandahs which are infilled on the upper floor.

== Heritage listing ==
The former Queensland National Bank building was listed on the Queensland Heritage Register on 21 October 1992 having satisfied the following criteria.

The place is important in demonstrating the evolution or pattern of Queensland's history.

The building (1914–15) is significant for demonstrating the growth of Maryborough during the early twentieth century as the centre of a large primary industry and manufacturing region.

The place is important in demonstrating the principal characteristics of a particular class of cultural places.

The building is a good and characteristic example of an early twentieth century bank, employing features of classical architecture.

The place is important because of its aesthetic significance.

The building is prominently sited and well composed, making a major visual contribution to the streetscape and to the character of the city centre.

The place has a special association with the life or work of a particular person, group or organisation of importance in Queensland's history.

The building is a major work of the important regional architect, Frederic Herbert Faircloth.
