= W. V. Ralston =

Australian banker (1846–1920)

Walter Vardon Ralston (August 1840 – 14 October 1920) was an Australian banker.

== History ==
Caricature by David Low

Ralston was born in Melbourne, Colony of New South Wales, a son of Gavan Ralston, but grew up in New Zealand, where he was educated. He returned to Australia as a teenager, settling in Queensland, where he worked on William Forrest's Mount Hutton cattle station, near Roma. He was later employed as manager of Forrest's Mount Larcom cattle station, near Gladstone, but suffered from "ague" (perhaps malaria), and around 1868 returned to Melbourne, where he found employment with the London Chartered Bank of Australia, followed by the National Bank of Australasia.

In 1874 he returned to Brisbane, where he worked as a teller at the Queensland National Bank, and later opened branches at Dalby, Tambo, and Cunnamulla. In 1881 he was appointed manager of the branch at Cooktown, and in 1888 promoted to the Townsville branch and in 1895 Rockhampton and in 1897 was acting manager at head office, Brisbane, made permanent the following year as successor to Edward Robert Drury CMG. His task as general manager was reconstruction of the bank, which had suffered greatly in the 1893 banking crisis. One of his innovations was the establishment of interminable inscribed stock, an important milestone in Australian banking history, and reinforced the bank's role in the development of the Colony and State of Queensland.

He was considered a top authority on financial matters, and was consulted by several State Treasurers and other politicians on likely consequences of implementation of policies. His reputation and influence extended beyond Queensland's borders: his advice was sought on Commonwealth banknote issue, and he was considered for appointment as the first governor of the Commonwealth Bank, but Denison Miller was the eventual appointment.

=== Other activities ===
Like his predecessor Drury, Ralston was actively involved in the country's defence. He served in the rank of major in both the Queensland Defence Forces and later the Commonwealth Military Force.

== Family ==
Ralston married Julia Mary Cormack, of Dalby, Queensland on 2 October 1875. They had a residence on Kedron Brook Road, Eildon Hill, Brisbane. There were no children.

Ralston died in his sleep after a few weeks' indisposition, though not severe enough to affect his work schedule until the last week. His remains were buried at the Toowong Cemetery.

The estate map of the Monte Video Estate in Windsor, Brisbane was advertised for sale in June 1929 and included the phrase - "For many years known as the residence and grounds of the late W. V. Ralston."
