= Queensland National Bank, Ipswich =

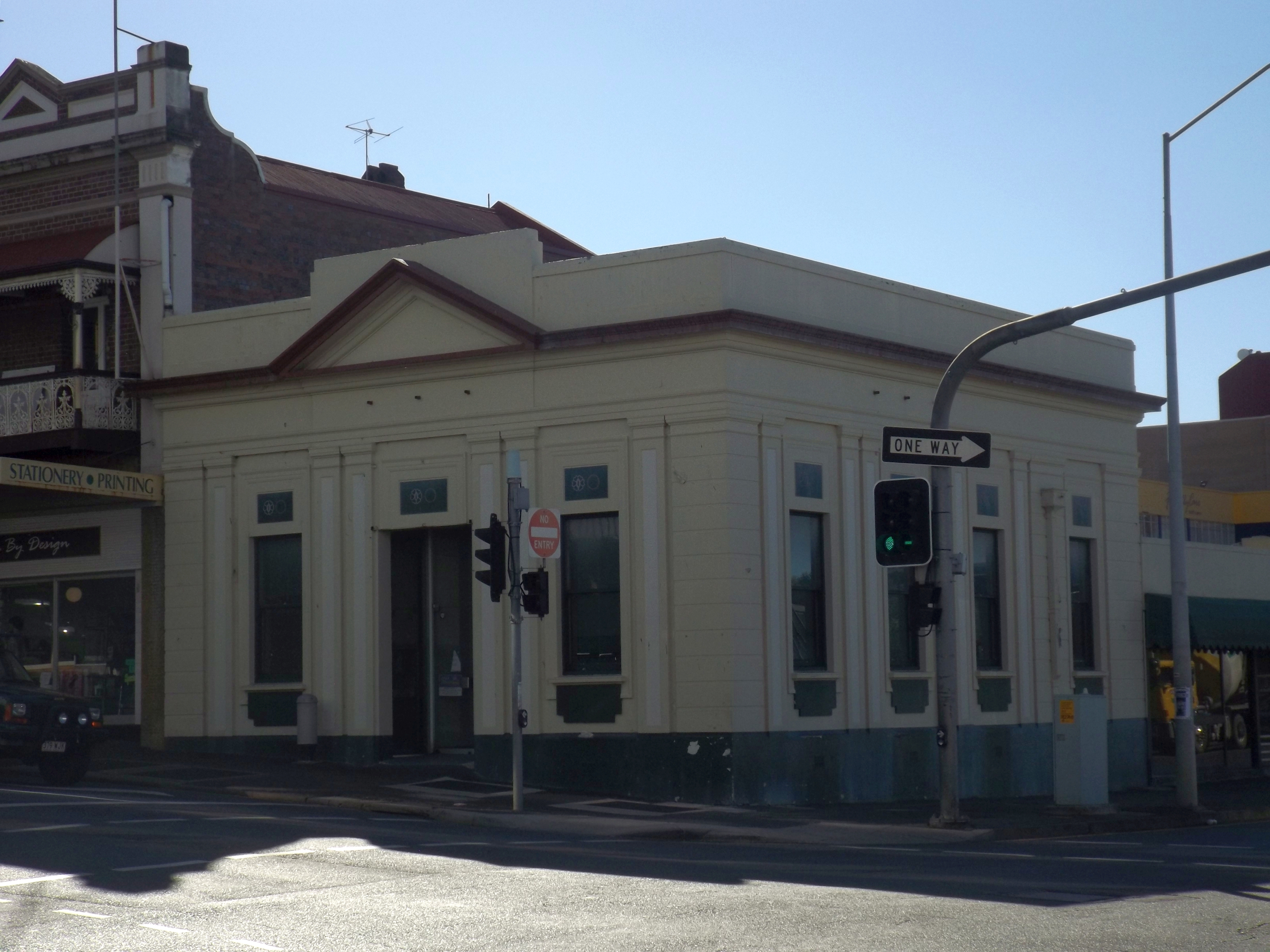
- Building in 2016

- Location within Queensland Location within Australia
- 27.6143°S 152.7608°E
- Location: 89 Brisbane Street, Ipswich, City of Ipswich, Queensland, Australia

History
- Design period: 1870s–1890s (late 19th century)
- Built: 1877–1935

Queensland Heritage Register
- Official name: Queensland National Bank – Bank of Queensland, National Bank of Australasia
- Type: state heritage (built)
- Designated: 21 October 1992
- Reference no.: 600559
- Significant period: 1870s, 1930s (fabric); 1883–1973, 1981–1987 (historical use as a bank)

The Queensland National Bank is a heritage-listed former bank building at 89 Brisbane Street, Ipswich, City of Ipswich, Queensland, Australia. It was built from 1877 to 1935. It is also known as National Bank of Australasia and Bank of Queensland. It was added to the Queensland Heritage Register on 21 October 1992.

== History ==
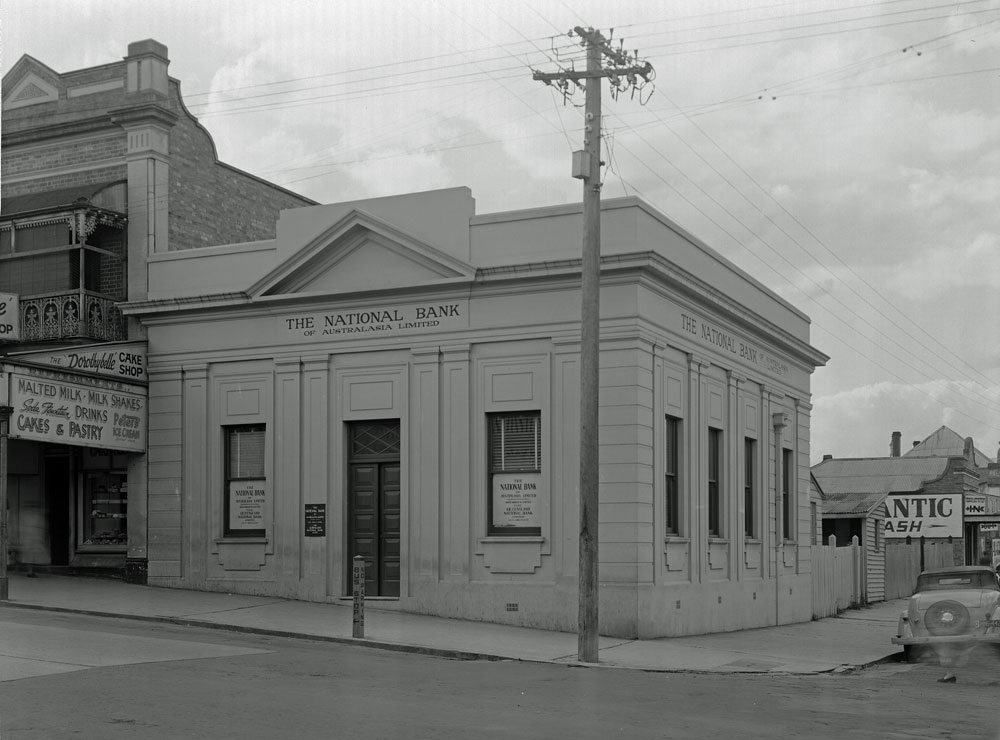
National Bank of Australasia, 1951

The Queensland National Bank building is a single storey rendered brick building originally constructed as an office in 1877. The original architect and builder are not known.

The first building on the site was George Thorn's Queen's Arms Hotel, built in 1843. This was demolished probably c. 1875 and the land sold as separate allotments. The corner site was bought by surveyor and real estate agent Enoch Bostock who constructed an office which opened for business on 1 January 1878. A three-stall stables was built behind the office and blacksmith William Hayne operated from there, using an entry in East Street.

In 1881, the building was bought by the Queensland National Bank which had opened its first Ipswich branch in 1873 in rented premises. After buying Bostock's building, the bank continued to operate from its old premises until the lease ran out. Builder Peter Brown was employed to renovate Bostock's former office in October 1882 and the bank moved there in 1883.

At this time, the bank was a simple rendered building with a central arched doorway and an arched window on either side, all with decorative pilasters and semi-circular heads with keystones. Bank records show that "general improvements" were made in 1935; this is believed to have been when the pediment was built above the entry and the windows and doors were changed.

In 1948, the Queensland National Bank was absorbed by the National Bank of Australasia Ltd which also had an Ipswich branch nearby in Brisbane St. The two branches remained in operation until 1973 when the former Queensland National Bank building was sold to solicitors Somers and Walker who used it as an office then leased it to the Bank of Queensland in 1981. A modern single storey extension was made along the East Street frontage in the late 1970s, consisting of four individual tenancies.

Until 1981, the interior of the main building had been timber panelled and included a solid timber counter while the main entrance was a panelled timber door. These were all removed by the Bank of Queensland who also added steel frames for signs to the exterior.

The bank was sold in 1987 and after again being leased as offices for Rose Jensen solicitors, became a stationery shop in 1997. It was placed for sale again the same year.

== Description ==
The former Queensland National Bank is a simple single-storey rendered brick building with a corrugated galvanised iron roof behind a raised parapet. The symmetrical main facade facing Brisbane St has a central doorway with a modern glass door, surmounted by a pediment and flanked by a pair of rectangular openings which still contain early double- hung timber windows.

The facade is decorated with simple pilasters and imitation block quoins. Beneath each window is a decorative motif consistent with the 1930s date of the building's remodelling. Modern steel frames attached to the exterior hold business signs.

Along the East Street frontage is a single-storey wing consisting of four individual tenancies. The northern end wall is brick and the tenancies have tinted glass shopfronts. The roof height is lower than the original bank building.

== Heritage listing ==
The former Queensland National Bank was listed on the Queensland Heritage Register on 21 October 1992 having satisfied the following criteria.

The place is important in demonstrating the evolution or pattern of Queensland's history.

Built c. 1877, the former Queensland National Bank demonstrates externally the stylistic characteristics of a small provincial town bank.

The place, although altered, retains aesthetic characteristics valued by the community and is part of a row of historic buildings which contribute to the streetscape of the Ipswich CBD.

It is associated with the Queensland National Bank and later the National Bank of Australasia in the provision of financial services in provincial towns.

The place is important in demonstrating the principal characteristics of a particular class of cultural places.

Built c. 1877, the former Queensland National Bank demonstrates externally the stylistic characteristics of a small provincial town bank.

The place is important because of its aesthetic significance.

The place, although altered, retains aesthetic characteristics valued by the community and is part of a row of historic buildings which contribute to the streetscape of the Ipswich CBD.

The place has a special association with the life or work of a particular person, group or organisation of importance in Queensland's history.

It is associated with the Queensland National Bank and later the National Bank of Australasia in the provision of financial services in provincial towns.
