= Queensland National Bank, South Brisbane =

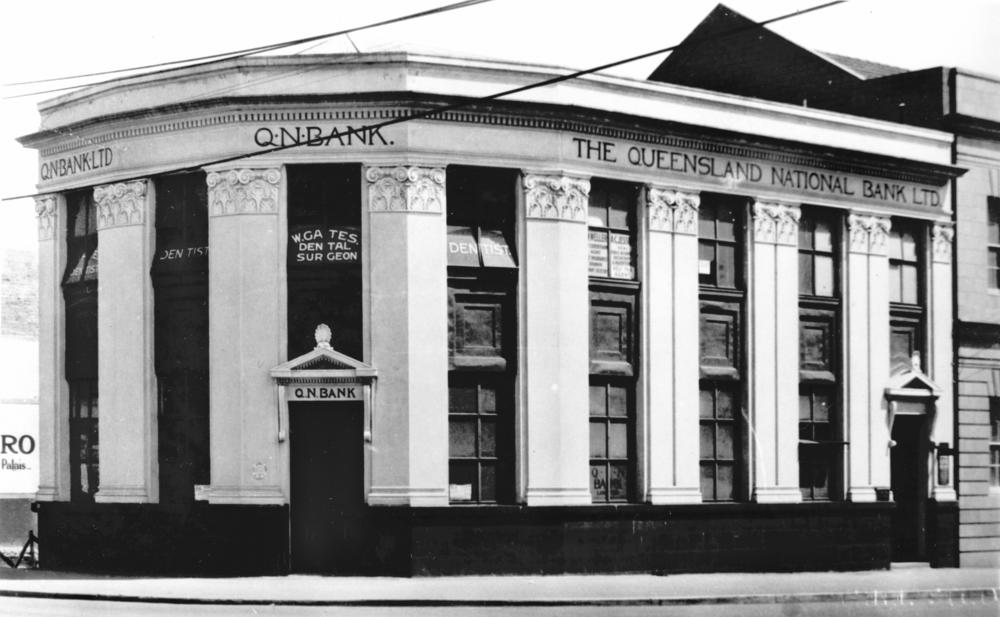
- Queensland National Bank building, South Brisbane, ca. 1928

- Location within Queensland Location within Australia
- 27.4739°S 153.0181°E
- Location: 39 Melbourne Street, South Brisbane, Queensland, Australia

History
- Design period: 1919–1930s (interwar period)
- Built: 1929

Site notes
- Architect: Addison & MacDonald
- Architectural style: Classicism

Queensland Heritage Register
- Official name: Queensland National Bank (former), South Brisbane Branch, Ng House
- Type: state heritage (built)
- Designated: 26 May 2000
- Reference no.: 602134
- Significant period: 1920s (fabric); 1929–1978 (historical use as bank)
- Significant components: strong room
- Builders: Albert Stonadge & Son

Queensland National Bank Building is a heritage-listed former bank at 39 Melbourne Street, South Brisbane, Queensland, Australia. It was designed by Addison & MacDonald and built in 1929 by Albert Stonadge & Son. It is also known as Ng House. It was added to the Queensland Heritage Register on 26 May 2000.

== History ==
The building was originally constructed as the South Brisbane branch of the Queensland National Bank. Constructed by local builders, A Stonadge and Son, to a design by Addison and MacDonald, the new premises at 39 Melbourne Street was opened for business on 31 July 1929.

The land on which the building was to be constructed was one of thirty allotments sold in the Brisbane land boom of 1854. The Deed of Grant for the land was acquired on 11 May 1854 by William John Loudon. As it was situated within the town limits drawn up in 1846, the allotment was affected by each of the major urban developments on the South Brisbane peninsula, such as the development of the public transport systems, the declaration of the first-class urban areas, and the widening of the major arterial roads (Melbourne and Grey Streets). It was also one of the many areas inundated by the floods of the 1890s. Subdivision of the original blocks was underway by 1870, and allotment 1 section 15, of which this site is a part, was acquired by Patrick Maunsell on 3 March 1871. It was sold by Maunsell's widow in 1897 and passed through several hands until the site was acquired by Janet Mearns Pike and Richard Pike in 1912.

The economic development of South Brisbane was reflected in the various properties which occupied the site prior to the construction of the bank in the late 1920s. These included boarding establishments in the late 19th and early 20th centuries which served the needs of workers and visitors to the city until 1917. The more diversified nature of commerce in the area from that time is reflected in the tenancy of the Pikes Building which was constructed by 1917. The State Department of Works leased the site in 1917 and various state offices including the Chief Protector of Aboriginals and the Department of Water Supply were situated there. In 1925, the whole of the site was resumed by the South Brisbane City Council. It passed to the Brisbane Municipal Council and, in 1927, part of the land was dedicated for road purposes. Resubdivision of the land followed and sub 3 of allotment 1 of section 15 was sold to the Queensland National Bank in September 1927. The Architecture and Building Journal of Queensland in July 1927 describes the "corner purchased by the Queensland National Bank as one of the gem positions of the whole business thoroughfare".

Brisbane City Council approved a new building for the Queensland National Bank Ltd, Queen Street, Brisbane in October 1928. Architects advertised for tenders and in the A & B Journal of Queensland, 19 November 1928, advertised that Albert Stonadge and Son's tender had been successful. The building cost just over £339. From 22 May 1928, the bank had occupied temporary premises in the adjacent Trocadero Building in Melbourne Street.

Situated on the corner of one of the three distinct shopping centres which developed in South Brisbane in the early twentieth century, Baynard's Corner Melbourne Street, the Queensland National Bank was ideally placed to capitalise on the industrial and commercial development on the South Brisbane Peninsula. The construction of the South Brisbane Branch of the Queensland National Bank may have reflected the determined drive by the Bank to increase its market share in Queensland and to acquire the custom of the importers and merchants of the cities.

The business potential of the Queensland National Bank many not have benefited to the same extent as that of its rival from the major developments in transport in the area; however, its drive to acquire the business of merchants and importers may well have been served by the up-grading of transport facilities in the area. These included the relocation of the in-bound lane of the tramway from Stanley Street to Grey Street in 1918. From that time, all in-bound trams from West End, Dutton Park, Ipswich Road, Coorparoo, Greenslopes and Balmoral stopped at the Bayards corner intersection where the bank was situated. When the Melbourne Street railway station became the terminus for both the interstate line through Kyogle as well as the southside commuter services, access to potential clients would have been increased considerably.

The South Brisbane branch was one of a number of suburban branches established in the 1920s. Its move into the area reflects the bank's optimism and confidence in the potential of the locale and its desire to capture a large slice of Queensland's financial markets - a confidence and desire which it apparently shared with its counterpart and rival, the Commonwealth Bank of Australia whose banking chambers adjoined. The building in both its aspect and architecture reflects both the optimism for the future and the competitive drive which several of the banks were exhibiting at this time.

In July 1949, title passed from the Queensland National Bank to the National Bank of Australasia, who held the property until 1978, when the branch was closed. Title to the land changed several times until the property was purchased by the current owners in 1983.

The former Queensland National Bank, South Brisbane Branch was identified as a Place of Contributory Significance in Brisbane City Council's 1993 Heritage Study of the South Brisbane, West End and Mater Hill areas. The Heritage Study was prepared as part of the South Brisbane Development Control Plan.

In 2016, the building is occupied by accountancy company Roger Ng & Co and the building is known as Ng House.

== Description ==
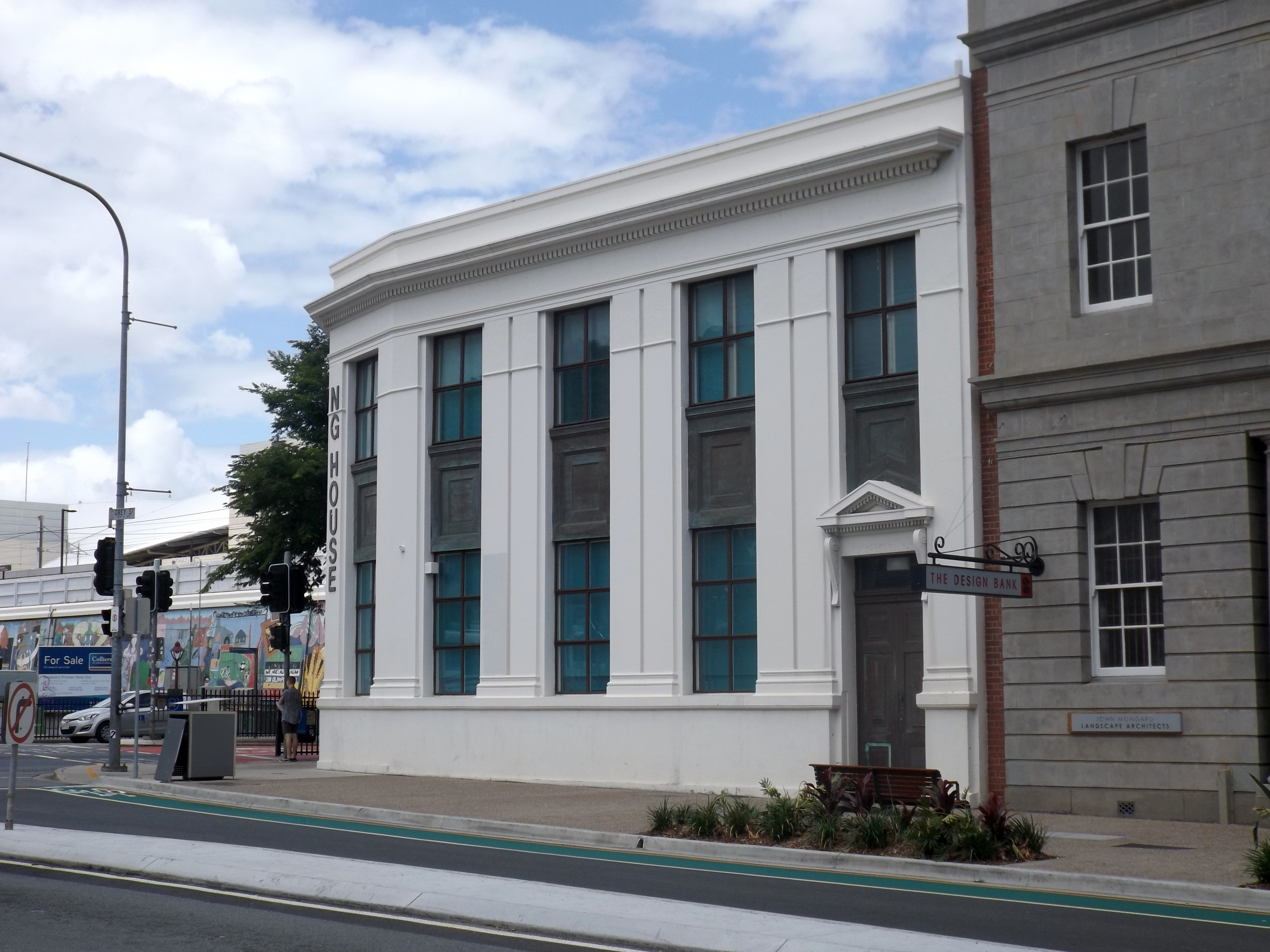
Structure in 2015

The former Queensland National Bank, South Brisbane Branch is a two-storey rendered brick building with a corrugated iron roof partly concealed by a decorative, moulded parapet with a dentilled cornice.

The building turns the corner between Melbourne and Grey Streets in three stages. Every change in angle occurs between a pair of pilasters. The eastern facade, along Grey Street, is divided into five bays by paired giant order pilasters. A paired, copper door is located along Grey Street topped by a classical entablature with a row of dentils. A similar entablature can be seen over a second entry at the right hand bay of the Grey Street frontage. The southern facade, along Melbourne Street is divided into two bays by pilasters. Double hung sash windows are located on both the ground and first floors. Recessed, square copper panels are placed between the upper and lower windows.

Internally, the building has undergone refurbishments on both the ground and first floors. The entrance foyer has a decorative plaster ceiling and cornices. An archway with recent decorative timber work opens to a hallway from which offices open on each side. Original timber doors, with breezeway assembly, remain in offices along the eastern wall. The original strong room is located in the northwestern corner of the ground floor.

A staircase, with a copper handrail, leads to the first floor landing which has an original cast iron railing. A downpipe has been retained in the southwestern wall on the first floor. The first floor offices are currently unoccupied.

== Heritage listing ==
The former Queensland National Bank (South Brisbane Branch) was listed on the Queensland Heritage Register on 26 May 2000 having satisfied the following criteria.

The place is important in demonstrating the evolution or pattern of Queensland's history.

The building is significant as it provides evidence of the contribution made by the building program of Queensland banks in the late 1920s, to the Queensland economy, reflecting the strength and solidity associated with the bank it represented.

The place demonstrates rare, uncommon or endangered aspects of Queensland's cultural heritage.

As a surviving remnant of the former scale of the South Brisbane area, which has been substantially altered due to development, the former bank is significant for its rarity.

The place is important because of its aesthetic significance.

Aesthetically significant, the former Queensland National Bank, along with the adjacent former Commonwealth Bank building, contributes to the Grey Street streetscape. Situated on the corner of Melbourne and Grey Streets, it is a prominent landmark in the South Brisbane area, reflected in its inclusion in the Brisbane City Council's Heritage Study of the South Brisbane, West End and Mater Hill areas.

The place has a strong or special association with a particular community or cultural group for social, cultural or spiritual reasons.

A purpose-built bank, constructed as the South Brisbane branch of the Queensland National Bank, the building is significant for its association with past and present clients of this major Queensland and Australian banking institution.

The place has a special association with the life or work of a particular person, group or organisation of importance in Queensland's history.

The former Queensland National Bank, South Brisbane Branch significant for its association with Brisbane architectural firm Addison and MacDonald who designed the building and with local building firm A Stonadge and Son.
