= Edward Robert Drury =

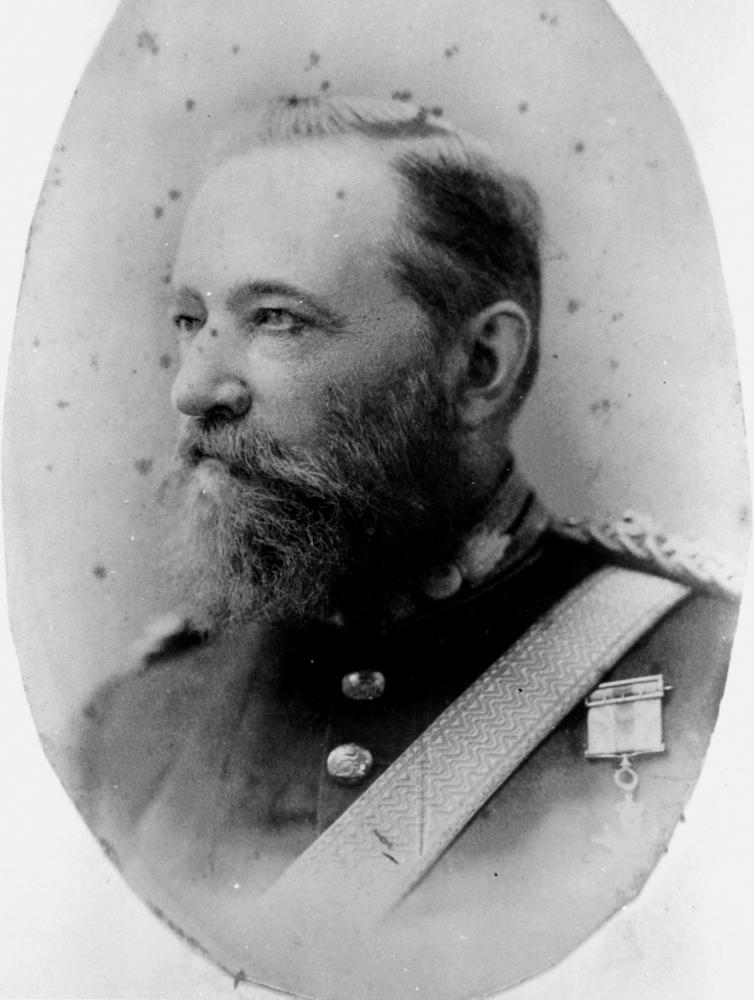
Edward Robert Drury, 1832-1896

Edward Robert Drury CMG (1832–1896) was a banker in Queensland, Australia. He was the first general manager of the Queensland National Bank which played a major role in Queensland finance in the late 19th century.

== Early life ==
Edward Robert Drury was born in 1832 in Brussels, Belgium, the son of the Rev. William James Joseph Drury (chaplain to the British Embassy in Brussels and tutor of Leopold II of Belgium) and his wife Anne (née Nicholas).

Drury immigrated to Australia in 1852.

== Business career ==
Drury was employed by the Bank of Australasia in 1853. In 1860 he was promoted to manager of their Brisbane branch.

In 1872, he was appointed the general manager of the new Queensland National Bank, a role he held until his death in 1896. He was the President of the Australian Association of Bankers from June 1894 to June 1895. Drury was professionally and personally committed to promoting development of the colony of Queensland. In both his banking role at the Queensland National Bank and his personal business activities, he was very involved with investment in mining, agriculture and land development.

In addition to his banking career, he was the Consul for Belgium for which he was made a Knight of the Order of Leopold.

== Military career ==
When the Crimean War broke out in 1854, Drury was one of the first to volunteer for the New South Wales Volunteer Rifles. On 15 November 1860, he received his commission as captain. He excelled at rifle shooting and won a silver medal in an 1854 Queensland competition of the National Rifle Association of England. He was a founder of the Queensland Rifle Association. In 1876 he was gazetted as a major in the Queensland Volunteer Artillery. In 1884 he was promoted to Lieutenant-Colonel and took command of the field artillery. In 1891 he became a Colonel and served as Commandant of the Queensland Defence Force on a number of occasions. In 1885, he was made a Companion of the Order of St Michael and St George for his contribution to colonial defence. He was one of the oldest officers on the active list.

== Later life ==
Edward Robert Drury died at his holiday home Saltwood at Shorncliffe on 3 February 1896 aged 63 years following an illness of 10 days. He was survived by his wife and eight children (four sons and four daughters).

On the following day (4 February 1896), his body was carried on a special train from Sandgate railway station to Brisbane's Central railway station where a full military guard waited. The streets were lined with spectators; indeed, the police had difficult keeping order at the railway station due to the extent of public interest. The military procession then slow-marched from the railway station through the streets of the Brisbane CBD to the Toowong Cemetery where he was interred. The procession was led by many branches of the defence forces, followed by his coffin on a gun carriage and his riderless war horse, after which came the carriages of the many mourners accompanied by military bands playing solemn tunes.

== Legacy ==
His holiday home Saltwood is now listed on the Queensland Heritage Register.

The family home "Hawstead" he built in 1876, originally perched on the edge of the Brisbane River in New Farm, Bowen Terrace. According to Brisbane City Council, this home was cut in half and removed from its original dwelling place in 1969 to make way for high rise apartments. It is unknown where the house was relocated to until 2002 when it was brought to acreage at Ajinby Close, Thornlands. It was rejoined, re-stumped and renovated. It stands proud today as a family home, cared for with many of its original features remaining intact. The home is not able to be Heritage listed as it was removed from its original site.

His eventual replacement, W. V. Ralston, was appointed general manager in 1898.
