= Queensland National Bank =

Former bank in Queensland, Australia

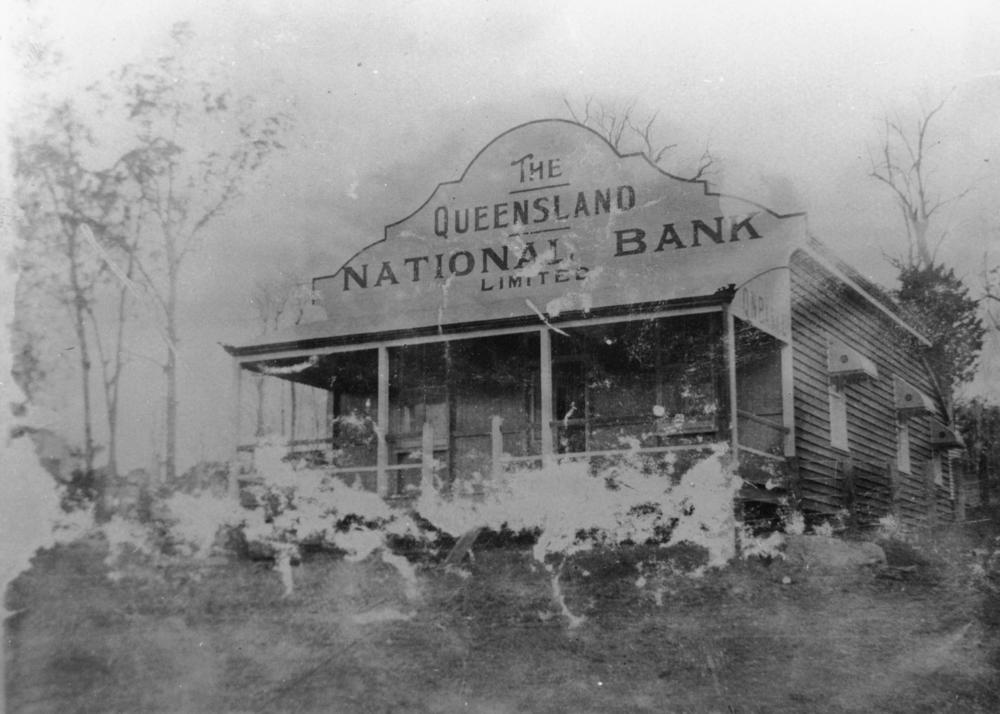
Queensland National Bank branch in Kandanga in 1914. Kandaga is 160 km northwest of Brisbane in the Gympie region.

The Queensland National Bank is a former bank in Queensland, Australia.

== History ==
In 1872, the bank was established in Brisbane.

In December 1914, the bank had its head office in Brisbane with branches throughout Queensland at Allora, Aramac, Ayr, Barcaldine, Beaudesert, Biggenden, Blackall, Boonah, Bundaberg, Burketown, Cairns (with a receiving office at Gordonvale), Charleville, Charters Towers, Childers (with a receiving office at Cordalba), Clifton, Cloncurry, Cooktown, Crows Nest, Cunnamulla, Dalby (with receiving offices at Bell and Tara), Esk, Forest Hill, Fortitude Valley, Gatton (with receiving office at Grantham), Gladstone, Goombungee, Goondiwindi, Greenmount, Gympie, Halifax, Herberton, Hughenden, Ingham, Innsifail, Ipswich, Invinebank, Jandowae, Kandanga, Killarney, Kingaroy, Laidley, Longreach, Mackay, Marburg, Mareeba, Maryborough, Millmerran, Mitchell (with receiving office at Mungallala), Mount Morgan, Murgon, Muttaburra, Nobby, Normanton, Oakey (with receiving offices at Jondaryan and Kingsthorpe), Pittsworth, Port Douglas, Ravenswood, Richmond, Rockhampton, Roma, Rosewood, Sarina, South Brisbane, Southbrook, St George, Tambo, Tannymorel, Thursday Island, Tingoora, Toogoolawah, Toowoomba, Townsville, Wahoon, Warra (with a receiving office at Brigalow), Warwick, Winton, Wondai, Wooroolin (with a receiving office at Memerambi), Yangan and Yarraman. It also had branches in London, Melbourne and Sydney and a network of agents in other countries.

The first general manager was Edward Robert Drury 1872–1896, succeeded by Walter Vardon Ralston 1898–1920.

In 1948, the bank was taken over by the National Bank of Australasia.

== Legacy ==
The bank constructed many substantial and ornate buildings as branches throughout Queensland. A number of extant buildings are heritage-listed, including:

- Queensland National Bank, Brisbane CBD (head office)
- Queensland National Bank, Charleville
- Queensland National Bank, Charters Towers
- Queensland National Bank, Childers
- Queensland National Bank, Cooktown
- Queensland National Bank, Forest Hill
- Queensland National Bank, Gympie
- Queensland National Bank, Ipswich
- Queensland National Bank, Irvinebank
- Queensland National Bank, Mackay
- Queensland National Bank, Maryborough
- Queensland National Bank, Rockhampton
- Queensland National Bank, South Brisbane
- Queensland National Bank, Townsville.

The locality of Qunaba takes its name from the Qunaba sugar mill, being in turn coined from the bank's name (QUeensland NAtional BAnk).

Queensland National Bank was inducted into the Queensland Business Leaders Hall of Fame in 2011, for their significant contribution to Queensland's early economic development.
