= City of Hervey Bay =

- Local government area
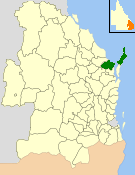
- Location within Queensland

- Country: Australia
- State: Queensland
- Region: Wide Bay–Burnett
- Location: 124 km (77 mi) SE of Bundaberg; 301 km (187 mi) N of Brisbane
- Established: 1879
- Abolished: 2008
- Council seat: Torquay

Area
  - Total: 2,356.3 km^{2} (909.8 sq mi)

Population
  - Total: 56,427 (2006 census)
  - Density: 23.9473/km^{2} (62.0232/sq mi)
- Website: City of Hervey Bay
LGAs around City of Hervey Bay
Isis	Pacific Ocean	Pacific Ocean
Isis	City of Hervey Bay	Pacific Ocean
Woocoo	Maryborough	Maryborough

The City of Hervey Bay was a local government area located in the Wide Bay–Burnett region of Queensland, Australia, containing the urban centre of Hervey Bay as well as the northern half of K'gari. The City covered an area of 2,356.3 square kilometres (909.8 sq mi), and existed as a local government entity in various forms from 1879 until 2008, when it was amalgamated with the City of Maryborough, Shire of Woocoo and the 1st and 2nd divisions of the Shire of Tiaro to form the Fraser Coast Region.

== History ==
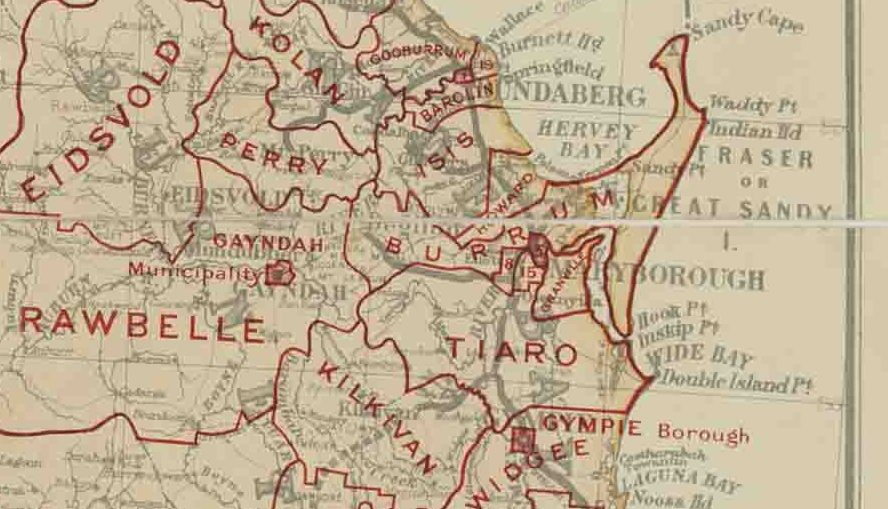
Map of Burrum Division and adjacent local government areas, March 1902. Legend: Maryborough Municipality (3), Antigua Division (8), Tinana Division (15)

The area now known as City of Hervey Bay first received local government with the Divisional Boards Act 1879, where on 11 November 1879, the Antigua (population 1636) and Burrum (population 1511) Divisions were created.

A later division, Howard, was split away from the Division of Isis in 1900.

With the passage of the Local Authorities Act 1902, the Antigua, Burrum and Howard Divisions became the Shires of Antigua, Burrum and Howard on 31 March 1903.

On 3 June 1905, the Shire of Degilbo, later renamed Biggenden, split away from the Shire of Burrum.

On 23 December 1905, the Shire of Burrum was renamed Pialba Shire Council.

=== Reorganisation of the Maryborough area in 1917 ===
On 17 February 1917, there was a reorganisation of local government in the Maryborough area. Five shires were abolished:

- Antigua
- Granville
- Howard
- Pialba
- Tinana

The resulting local government areas were:

- a recreated Shire of Burrum, comprising all of the Shires of Howard and Pialba and part of the Shire of Antigua and part of the City of Maryborough
- an altered Shire of Kilkivan, losing parts to the Shire of Tiaro and the Shire of Tinana but gaining part of the Shire of Tiaro and part of the Shire of Woocoo
- an altered City of Maryborough, losing a small part to the Shire of Burrum but gaining part of the Shire of Granville
- an altered Shire of Tiaro, losing part to Shire of Kilkivan, but gaining parts of the Shires of Granville, Kilkivan and Widgee
- an altered Shire of Tinana, gaining parts of the Shires of Granville, Kilkivan and Widgee
- an altered Shire of Widgee, losing part to Shire of Kilkivan, but gaining part of the Shire of Tiaro
- an enlarged Shire of Woocoo, losing part to the Shire of Kilkivan, but gaining parts of the Shires of Antigua and Howard

=== A coastal focus in the 1970s ===
By the 1920s the Hervey Bay area was rapidly expanding due to continuing growth in the primary industries such as sugar cane, citrus, pineapples, beef cattle and fishing, as well as investment in transport infrastructure. In the 1950s and 1960s, population and development increased, and the coastal settlements slowly merged into a single urban area.

On 20 December 1975, the Shire of Burrum was renamed the Shire of Hervey Bay with effect from the local government elections of 27 March 1976. With the new focus on the coastal region, 1,086.4 km^{2} (419.5 sq mi) of its area, with an estimated population of 1,119, was annexed by the City of Maryborough, while 1,269.0 km^{2} (490.0 sq mi) with an estimated population of 2,629 was annexed by the Shire of Woocoo.

In September 1977, the Shire of Hervey Bay became the Town of Hervey Bay, and on 18 February 1984 it became a City.

=== Amalgamations of 2008 ===
On 15 March 2008, under the Local Government (Reform Implementation) Act 2007 passed by the Parliament of Queensland on 10 August 2007, Hervey Bay merged with the City of Maryborough, Shire of Woocoo and part of Tiaro to form the Fraser Coast Region.

== Suburbs and localities ==
The City of Hervey Bay included the following settlements:

Urban Hervey Bay:

- Booral
- Bunya Creek
- Craignish
- Dundowran
- Dundowran Beach
- Eli Waters
- Kawungan
- Nikenbah
- Pialba
- Point Vernon
- Scarness
- Sunshine Acres
- Susan River
- Takura
- Toogoom
- Torquay
- Urangan
- Urraween
- Walligan
- Wondunna

Rural Hervey Bay:

- Beelbi Creek
- Burgowan
- Burrum Heads
- Burrum River
- Burrum Town
- Cherwell
- Dundathu
- Howard
- Pacific Haven
- River Heads
- Torbanlea
- Walliebum

== Population ==
Year	Population
1921	6,838
1933	6,835
1947	8,642
1954	8,408
1961	8,991
1966	9,271
1971	6,960
1976	10,304
1981	16,402
1986	20,660
1991	30,867
1996	42,391
2001	45,959
2006	56,427

== Chairmen and mayors ==
=== Chairmen of Burrum Divisional Board ===
- 1888: Mr Tooth (1888)
- 1898: Edward Bernard Cresset Corser

=== Chairmen of Shire of Burrum / Pialba ===
- 1905: Hans Jacob Fevre
- 1916: H. Hansen
- 1918: Henry Bashford
- 1927: Edward James Stafford

=== Mayors of City of Hervey Bay ===
- Judy Rice (1985–1988)
- Fred Kleinschmidt (1988–1997)
- Bill Brennan (1997–2000)
- Ted Sorensen (2000–2008)
