= Maryborough–Hervey Bay Road =

Road in Queensland, Australia

Maryborough–Hervey Bay Road Queensland

General information
- Type: Road
- Length: 44.9 km (28 mi)
- Route number(s): State Route 57

Major junctions
- North end: Bruce Highway Tinana
- Maryborough–Biggenden Road; Maryborough–Cooloola Road; Torbanlea–Pialba Road; Booral Road; Pialba–Burrum Heads Road
- South end: Elizabeth Street Urangan

Location(s)
- Major suburbs: Maryborough, St Helens, Susan River, Nikenbah, Scarness, Torquay

Maryborough–Hervey Bay Road is a continuous 44.9 kilometres (27.9 mi) road route in the Fraser Coast region of Queensland, Australia. The entire route is signed as State Route 57. It is a state-controlled regional road (number 163).

== Route description ==
The road commences as Gympie Road at an intersection with the Bruce Highway (A1) in Tinana. It runs north-east through Tinana before crossing the Mary River and entering Maryborough. It continues to the north-east on Ferry Street, passing exits to Maryborough–Biggenden Road and Maryborough–Cooloola Road. It turns south-east on Walker Street and north-east on John Street as it passes through the Maryborough CBD. It then turns north on Saltwater Creek Road, where it passes the Maryborough Airport and leaves Maryborough. It passes through the locality of St Helens, crosses Saltwater Creek, and enters Dundathu, where the road name changes to Maryborough–Hervey Bay Road.

From Dundathu it passes through Walliebum and Susan River, where it crosses the Susan River (the watercourse). It then runs between Walligan and Sunshine Acres, where it passes exits to Torbanlea–Pialba Road and Booral Road before entering Nikenbah. From there the road runs through to the northern boundary of Urraween, passing the exit to Pialba–Burrum Heads Road, and then turns east as Boat Harbour Drive. It passes through Scarness and Torquay to Urangan, where it ends at an intersection with Elizabeth Street.

=== Intersection upgrade ===
A project to upgrade the intersection with Pialba-Burrum Heads Road, at a cost of $44.1 million, was to be completed by the end of 2022.

=== Tourist Drive 12 ===
Tourist Drive 12 follows the road from Tinana to Urangan, with two major deviations. In Maryborough the drive includes many local attractions away from the through route on both sides of the road. At the Walligan / Sunshine Acres midpoint it turns into Booral Road and follows it to Urangan. To avoid additional complexity the tourist drive is not shown in the major intersections table.

== History ==
Pastoral leases were taken up in the Fraser Coast Region from 1843, and European settlement of what is now Maryborough began in 1847. It was declared a port of entry in 1859 and soon became the major port of entry for immigrants to Queensland. Dalgaroom pastoral run was established in the Hervey Bay area in 1855. Timbergetting began in the district in the mid 1860's, resulting in cleared tracts of land suitable for crop farming. In 1872 Dalgaroom was reduced to 14,000 acres (5,700 ha) and renamed Toogoom. In 1887, 11,000 acres (4,500 ha) of land were resumed from the Toogoom pastoral run for the establishment of small farms. The land was offered for selection on 17 April 1887. The opening of new farms on the southern shore of Hervey Bay led to the development of roads in the area.

By the mid 1860's five settlers had taken up leases along the coastal strip from Point Vernon to Urangan. A small village soon developed on each, with wealthy businessmen buying blocks for holiday homes. In 1883 two sugar juice mills opened near Pialba, which became a small town. Due to its central location in the developing community and its suitability as a port for barges transferring smaller items from ship to shore, Pialba became the administrative centre of the Hervey Bay region. This led to the need for a road to transport larger quantities of products and materials to and from Maryborough, and also requests for a railway line. The road was completed quickly, but a railway did not arrive until 1896. Meanwhile, further road improvements had been undertaken.

The railway was extended to Urangan in 1913, and the Urangan pier was completed in 1916. The presence of a deep-water port led to a substantial increase in the number of wheeled vehicles negotiating the streets between Pialba and Urangan. This problem was ultimately solved by the construction of a new road, on open land to the south of the coastal villages, in conjunction with the construction of the Urangan Boat Harbour in the 1960's.

== Intersecting state-controlled roads ==
This road intersects with the following state-controlled roads:

- Maryborough–Cooloola Road
- Torbanlea–Pialba Road
- Booral Road
- Pialba–Burrum Heads Road

=== Maryborough–Cooloola Road ===
Maryborough–Cooloola Road
- Location: Maryborough–Hervey Bay Road, Maryborough to Tin Can Bay Road, Wallu
- Length: 59.4 km (36.9 mi)

Maryborough–Cooloola Road (number 166) is a state-controlled regional road. It runs from Maryborough–Hervey Bay Road in Maryborough to Tin Can Bay Road in Wallu, a distance of 59.4 kilometres (36.9 mi). This road has no major intersections.

=== Torbanlea–Pialba Road ===
Torbanlea–Pialba Road
- Location: Bruce Highway, Torbanlea to Maryborough–Hervey Bay Road, Walligan
- Length: 21.7 km (13.5 mi)

Torbanlea–Pialba Road (number 164) is a state-controlled district road rated as a local road of regional significance (LRRS). It runs from the Bruce Highway in Torbanlea to Maryborough–Hervey Bay Road in Walligan, a distance of 21.7 kilometres (13.5 mi). It intersects with Burrum Heads Road in Torbanlea.

A project to improve flood immunity and intersections on Torbanlea–Pialba Road, at a cost of $30 million, was expected to be complete in late 2023.

=== Booral Road ===
Booral Road
- Location: Maryborough–Hervey Bay Road, Sunshine Acres to Maryborough–Hervey Bay Road, Urangan, via Booral
- Length: 18.3 km (11.4 mi)

Booral Road (number 1632) is a state-controlled district road rated as a local road of regional significance (LRRS). It runs from Maryborough–Hervey Bay Road in Sunshine Acres to the same road in Urangan, travelling via Booral, a distance of 18.3 kilometres (11.4 mi). This road intersects with River Heads Road in Booral.

A project to plan for the upgrade of flood immunity and safety on Booral Road was expected to complete by mid-2024.

=== Pialba–Burrum Heads Road ===
Pialba–Burrum Heads Road
- Location: Maryborough–Hervey Bay Road, Urraween to Burrum Heads Road, Burrum River
- Length: 23.7 km (14.7 mi)

Pialba–Burrum Heads Road (number 162) is a state-controlled district road rated as a local road of regional significance (LRRS). It runs from Maryborough–Hervey Bay Road in Urraween to Burrum Heads Road in Burrum River, a distance of 23.7 kilometres (14.7 mi). This road has no major intersections.

== Associated state-controlled roads ==
The following state-controlled roads are termini of Maryborough–Cooloola Road and Pialba–Burrum Heads Road:

- Tin Can Bay Road
- Burrum Heads Road

=== Burrum Heads Road ===
Burrum Heads Road
- Location: Torbanlea–Pialba Road, Torbanlea to Esplanade, Burrum Heads
- Length: 20.9 km (13.0 mi)

Burrum Heads Road is a state-controlled district road (number 1603), rated as a local road of regional significance (LRRS). It runs from Torbanlea–Pialba Road in Torbanlea to the Esplanade in Burrum Heads, a distance of 20.9 kilometres (13.0 mi). It intersects with Pialba–Burrum Heads Road in Burrum River.

== Major intersections ==
All distances are from Google Maps. The entire road is in the Fraser Coast local government area.

| Location | km | mi | Destinations | Notes |
|---|---|---|---|---|
| Tinana | 0 | 0.0 | Bruce Highway – south – Tiaro, Gunalda north – Torbanlea, Childers | South western end of Maryborough–Hervey Bay Road (State Route 57); Road continues north east as Gympie Road. |
| Tinana / Maryborough midpoint | 3.2– 3.4 | 2.0– 2.1 | Lamington Bridge over Mary River | Name changes to Ferry Street |
| Maryborough | 4.4 | 2.7 | Maryborough–Biggenden Road – northwest – Bruce Highway and Maryborough West, Brooweena, Biggenden; Alice Street to Maryborough–Cooloola Road – southeast – Cooloola | |
| Maryborough | 5.3 | 3.3 | Walker Street – northwest Ferry Street – northeast – Maryborough CBD | Road turns south east on Walker Street |
| Maryborough | 5.7 | 3.5 | John Street – southwest Walker Street – southeast – Maryborough CBD | Road turns north east on John Street |
| Maryborough | 6.3 | 3.9 | Percy Street – northwest John Street – northeast – Maryborough northern outskirts | Road turns north on Saltwater Creek Road |
| St Helens / Dundathu midpoint | 12.8 | 8.0 | Bridge over Saltwater Creek | Name changes to Maryborough–Hervey Bay Road |
| Walligan / Sunshine Acres midpoint | 27.3 | 17.0 | Torbanlea–Pialba Road – west – Torbanlea; Booral Road – northeast – Booral, Urangan, River Heads | |
| Urraween / Eli Waters midpoint | 36.6 | 22.7 | Pialba–Burrum Heads Road – west – Burrum Heads | |
| Urraween / Eli Waters / Pialba tripoint | 37.2 | 23.1 | Old Maryborough Road – northeast – Pialba | Name changes to Boat Harbour Drive. Road continues east. |
| Urangan | 44.9 | 27.9 | Elizabeth Street – north – Urangan – south – Booral, River Heads; Boat Harbour Drive – east – Urangan | North eastern end of Maryborough-Hervey Bay Road |
1.000 mi = 1.609 km; 1.000 km = 0.621 mi: Route transition

== See also ==
- List of road routes in Queensland
- List of numbered roads in Queensland
- Hervey Bay (Queensland), the body of water
- Pialba Memorial Cenotaph
