= Hervey Bay =

- City
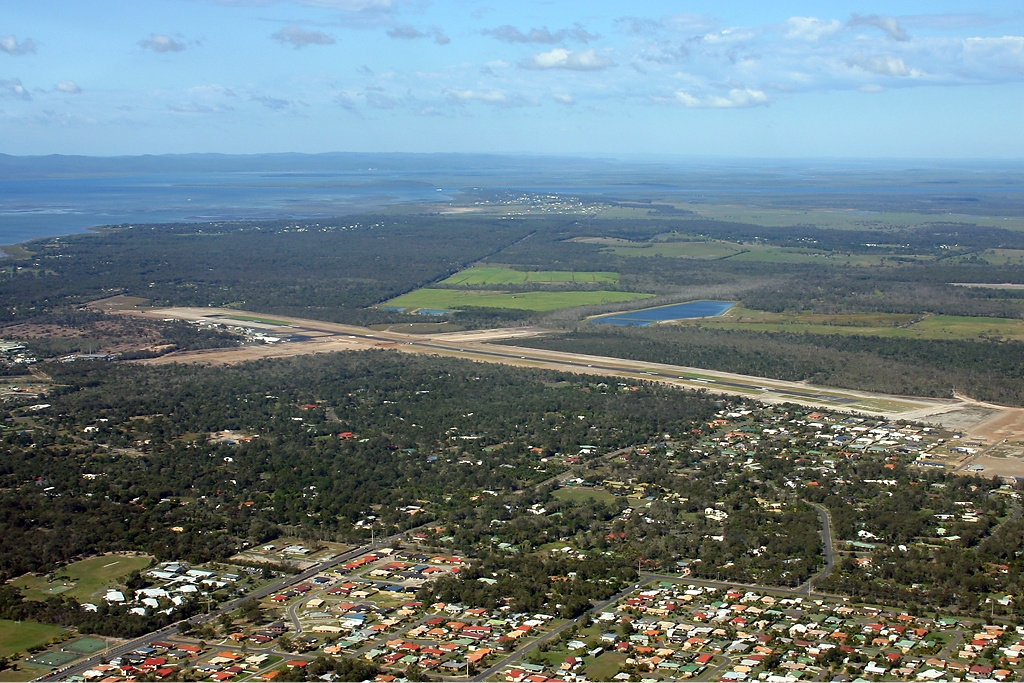
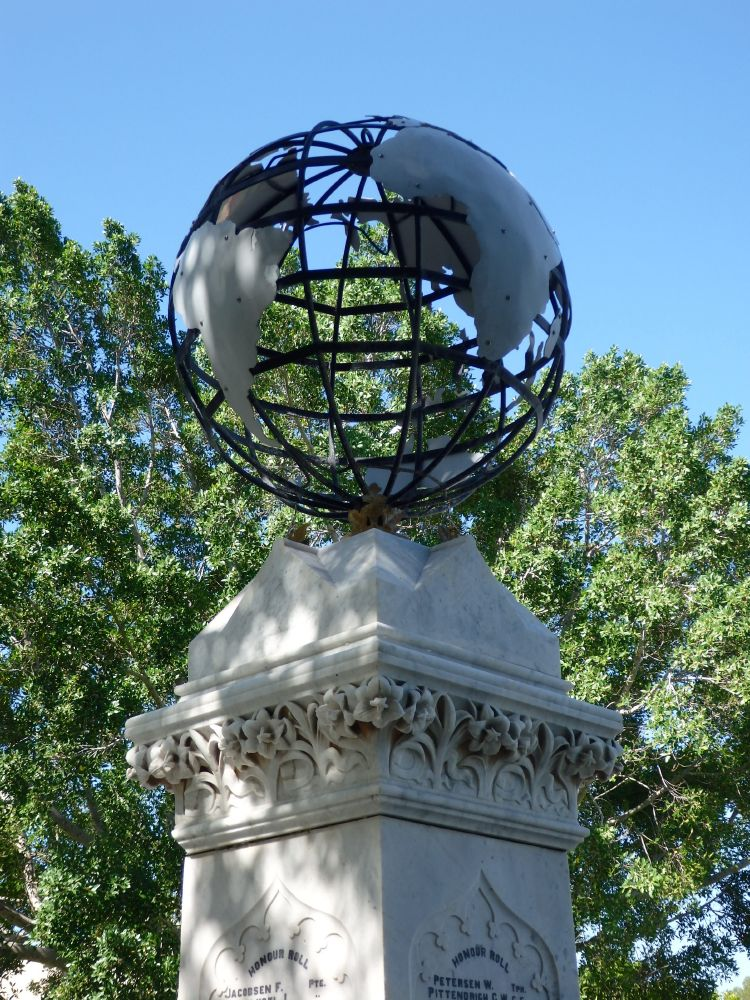
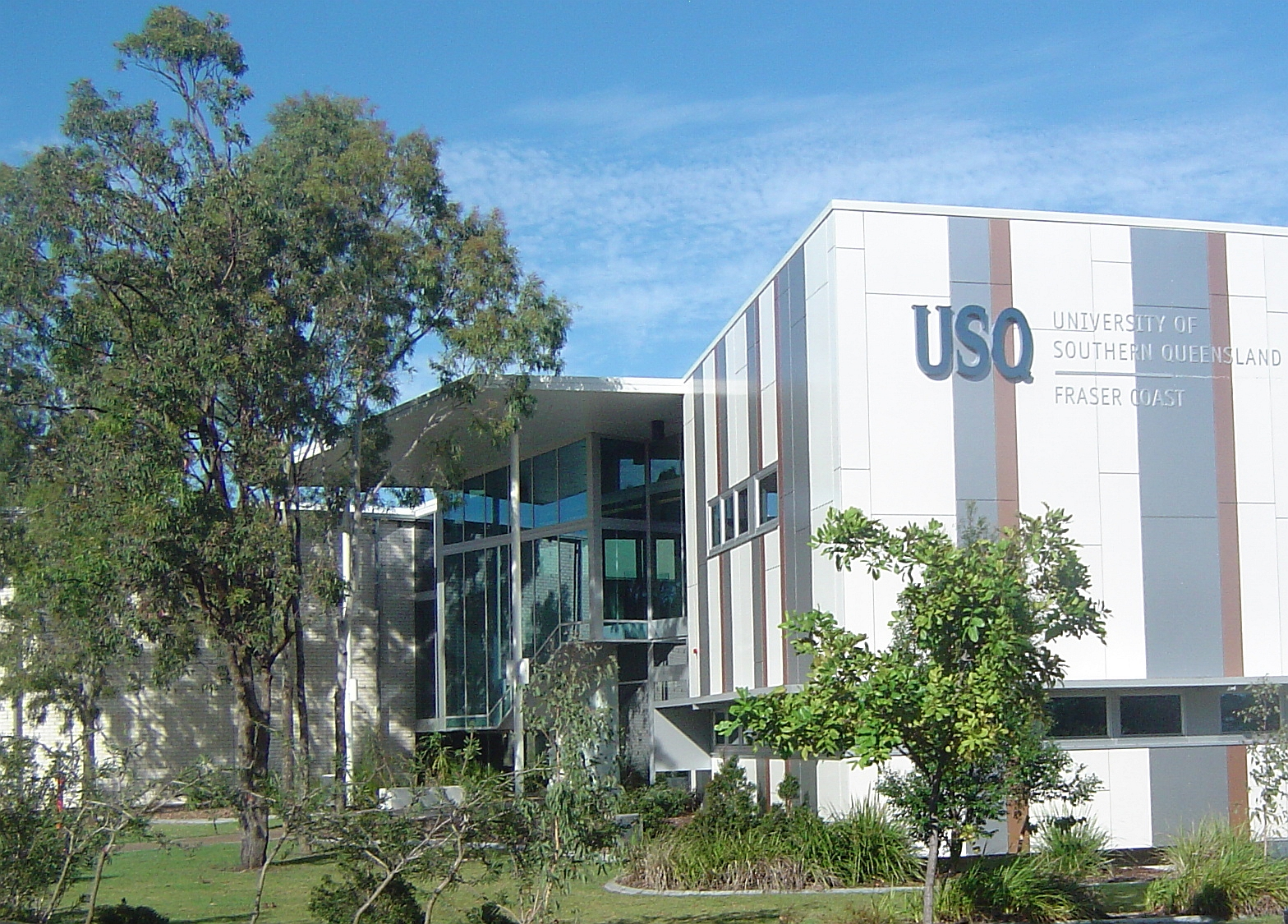
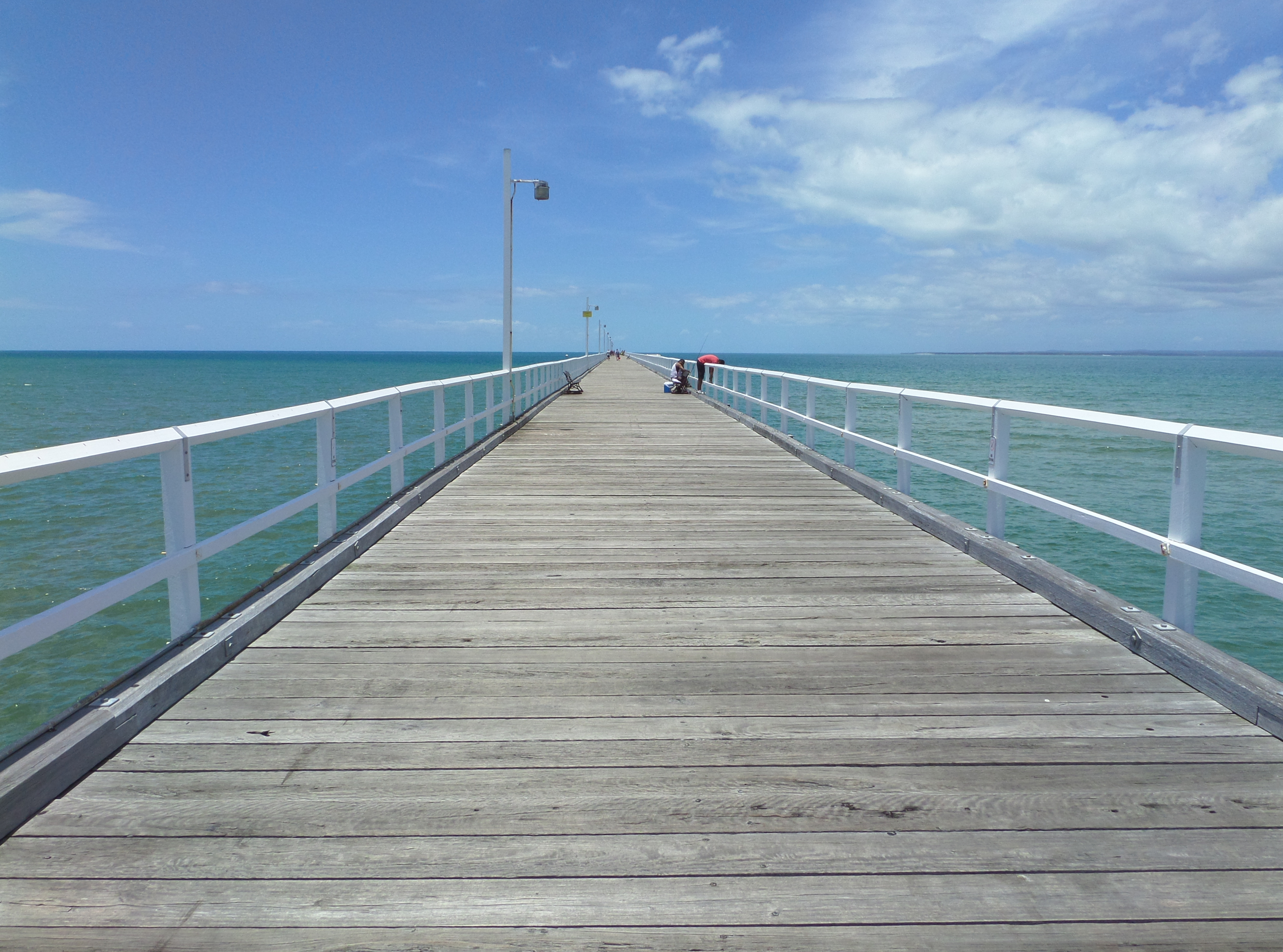
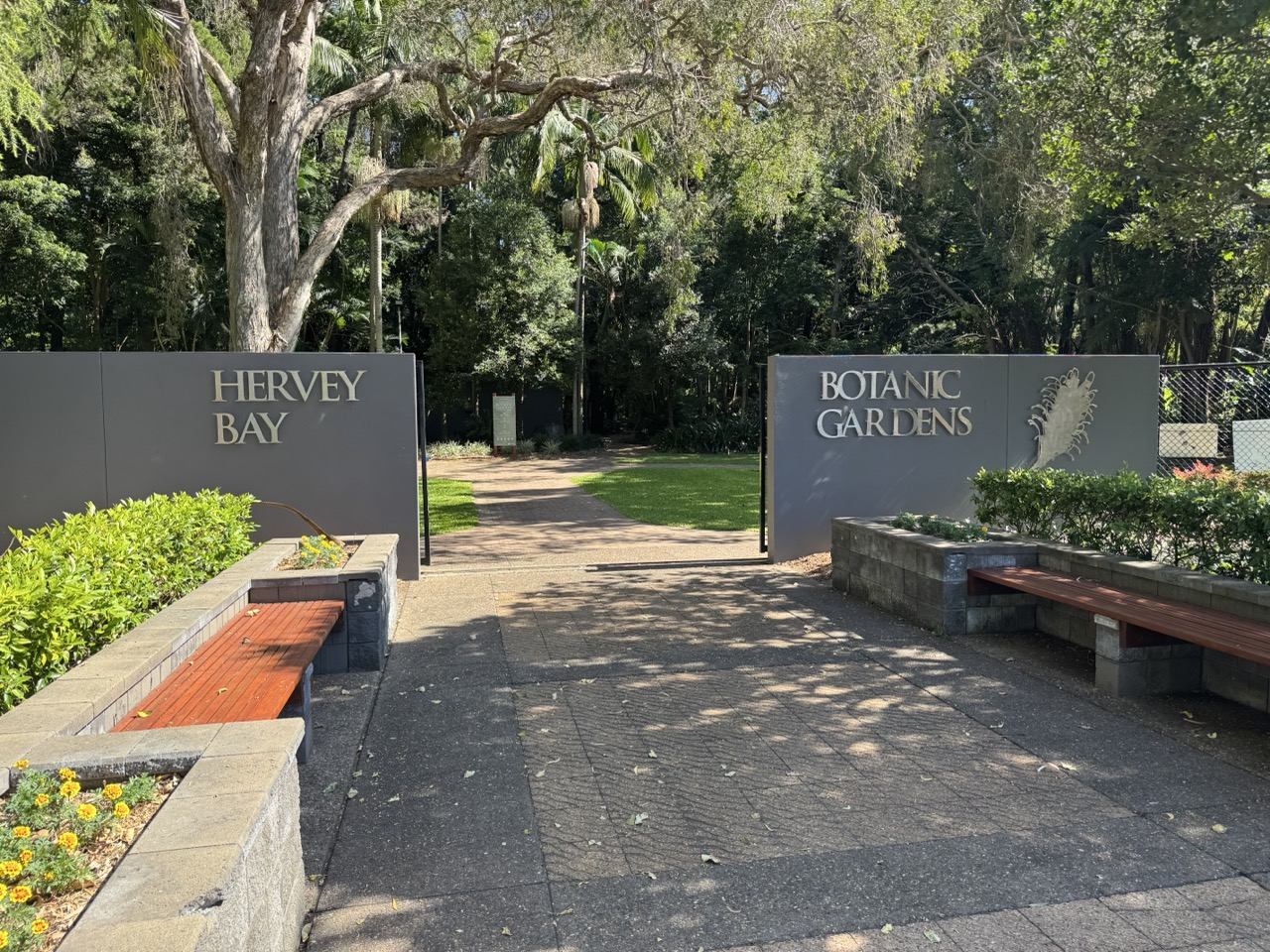
- View over the city and Hervey Bay Airport towards the Great Sandy Strait War Memorial in Freedom Park University of Southern Queensland Urangan Pier Hervey Bay Botanic Gardens entrance

- Coordinates: 25.29°S 152.84°E
- Country: Australia
- State: Queensland
- Region: Wide Bay-Burnett
- LGA: Fraser Coast Region
- Location: 29.6 km (18.4 mi) NNE of Maryborough; 110 km (68 mi) SE of Bundaberg; 286 km (178 mi) N of Brisbane
- Established: 1863

Government
  - State electorates: Hervey Bay; Maryborough
  - Federal division: Hinkler

Area (2011 urban)
  - Total: 93.2 km^{2} (36.0 sq mi)
- Elevation: 23 m (75 ft)

Population
  - Totals: 57,722 (2021 census) (27th); 52,073 (2016 census)
  - Density: 619.3/km^{2} (1,604.1/sq mi)
- Time zone: UTC+10:00 (AEST)
- Postcode: 4655
- Mean max temp: 26.2 °C (79.2 °F)
- Mean min temp: 16.6 °C (61.9 °F)
- Annual rainfall: 1,061.6 mm (41.80 in)

Hervey Bay (/ˈhɛərvi/ HER-vee) is a city on the coast of the Fraser Coast Region of Queensland, Australia. The city is situated approximately 290 kilometres (180 mi) or 3½ hours' highway drive north of the state capital, Brisbane. It is located on the bay of the same name open to the Coral Sea between the Queensland mainland and nearby Fraser Island (also known as K'gari). The local economy relies on tourism which is based primarily around whale watching in Platypus Bay to the north, ferry access to Fraser Island, accessible recreational fishing and boating and the natural north facing, calm beaches with wide undeveloped foreshore zones. In October 2019, Hervey Bay was named the First Whale Heritage Site in the world by the World Cetacean Alliance, for its commitment to and practices of sustainable whale and dolphin watching.

In the 2021 census, Hervey Bay had a population of 57,722 people. A 2010 study by Deakin University showed that people on the Fraser Coast area including Hervey Bay, were the happiest in Australia.

The area that became Hervey Bay is on the traditional lands of the Butchulla people. The city takes its name from Hervey Bay, named by James Cook in 1770 in honour of Augustus Hervey, 3rd Earl of Bristol. Several small townships developed along the bayside, the earliest being Pialba in 1863. From 1863 to 1906, the Wide Bay region became a central part of the Pacific Slave trade, with more than 12 thousand South Sea Islanders brought to the cotton and sugarcane plantations in Maryborough and Hervey Bay. During World War II, the region operated a training school for the Z Special Unit special forces. Hervey Bay boomed from the 1980s on and was proclaimed a city in 1984.

== History ==
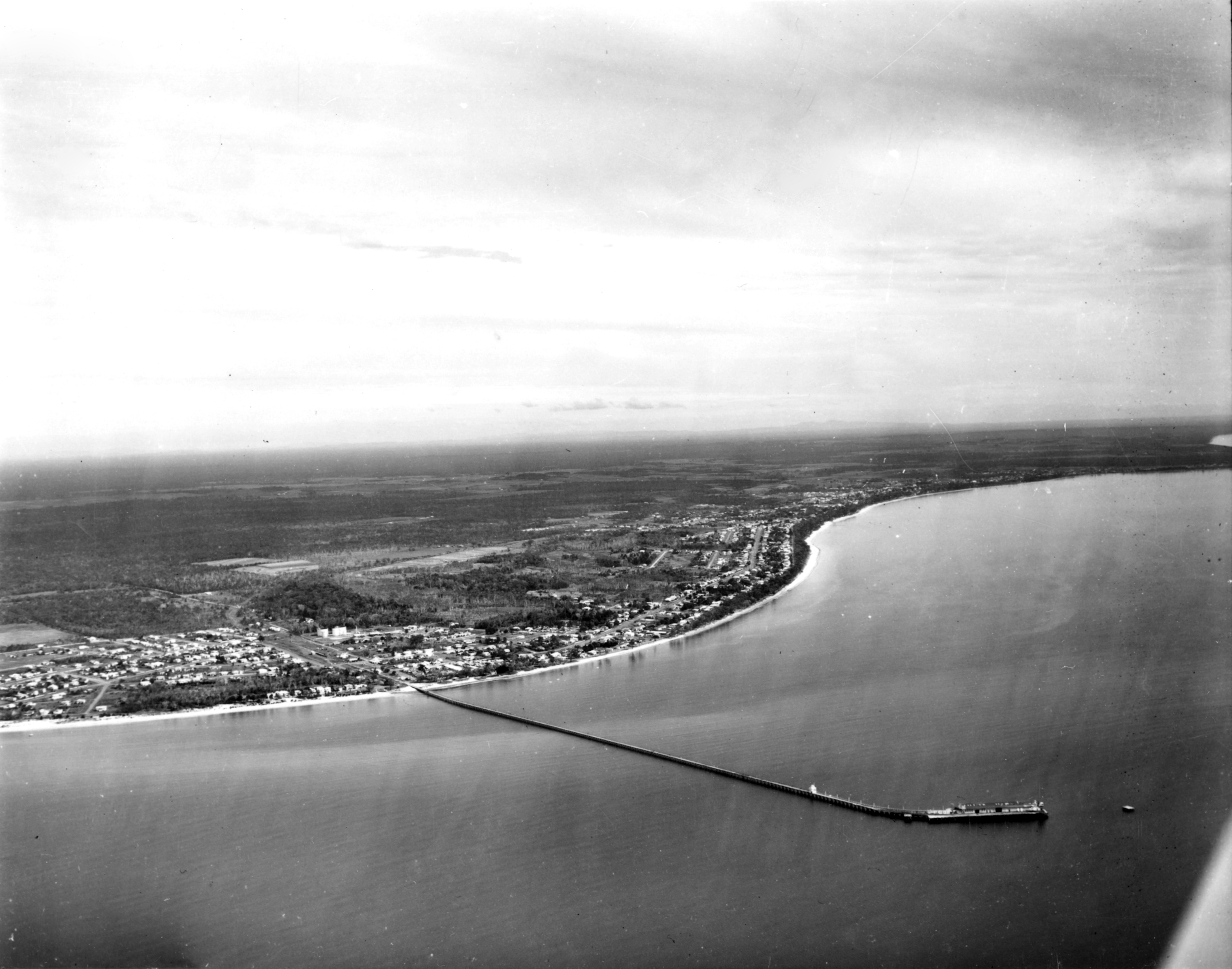
Hervey Bay (the town in the background, the bay in the foreground) with the Urangan Pier, 1967

Butchulla (also known as Batjala, Badtjala, Badjela, and Badjala) is the language of the Fraser Coast region, including K’gari. Butchulla language region includes the landscape within the local government boundaries of the Fraser Coast Regional Council, particularly the towns of Maryborough and Hervey Bay extending south towards Double Island Point and north to Burrum Heads.

The indigenous Batjala people including the Kabi Kabi are the traditional owners of Hervey Bay. Batjala means Bat-No and Jala-tongu. The first recorded European sighting of Hervey Bay was made by James Cook while carrying out his running survey of the east coast of Australia, on 22 May 1770. By noon Cook's ship was in a position a little over half-way across the opening of Hervey Bay heading for Bundaberg. When Cook first discovered Hervey Bay, he did not realise that Fraser Island was separated from mainland Australia; Cook did not travel far enough south due to the shallow depths of the waters in the Bay. Cook named the bay "Hervey's Bay" after Augustus John Hervey (1724–1779), later Third Earl of Bristol, a naval officer who became a Lord of the Admiralty the year Endeavour returned.

Until around the mid-1980s the area was serviced by a rail link from the main North Coast line that diverted from Aldershot and went through Takura, Walligan, and Nikenbah, before continuing on to Pialba and Urangan. The line was a major freight point for the Port of Maryborough and for the sugar cane industry until road transport assumed the role.

On 18 February 1984, the Town of Hervey Bay was officially proclaimed as the "City of Hervey Bay", due to its increasing population and growth in its business sector and tourism industry. Despite this, many of the local residents still saw it as a small seaside village. Along with the City of Maryborough and the Shire of Woocoo, as well as parts of the Shire of Tiaro, it was amalgamated into the Fraser Coast Region on 15 March 2008.

The former Hervey Bay Library opened in 1997 and had a major refurbishment in 2014. The new Hervey Bay Library was opened on 31 August 2026.

The new library and community hub are part of the Hinkler Regional Deal.

== Demographics ==
In the 2016 census, Hervey Bay had a population of 52,073 people. Aboriginal and Torres Strait Islander people made up 4.0% of the population. The median age of people was 48 years, ten years older than the national median age. 74.6% of people were born in Australia. The next most common countries of birth were England 5.9%, New Zealand 3.5%, Germany 0.8%, Scotland 0.6%, and Philippines 0.6%. 88.4% of people only spoke English at home. Other languages spoken at home included German 0.5%, French 0.2%, Mandarin 0.2%, Dutch 0.2%, and Italian 0.2%. The most common responses for religion were no religion 28.0%, Anglican 20.5%, and Catholic 18.9%.

In the 2021 census, Hervey Bay had a population of 57,722 people.

== Heritage listings ==
Hervey Bay has a number of heritage-listed sites. K'gari is listed on the World Heritage List. The Woody Island Lighthouses are listed on the Queensland Heritage Register.

== Transport ==
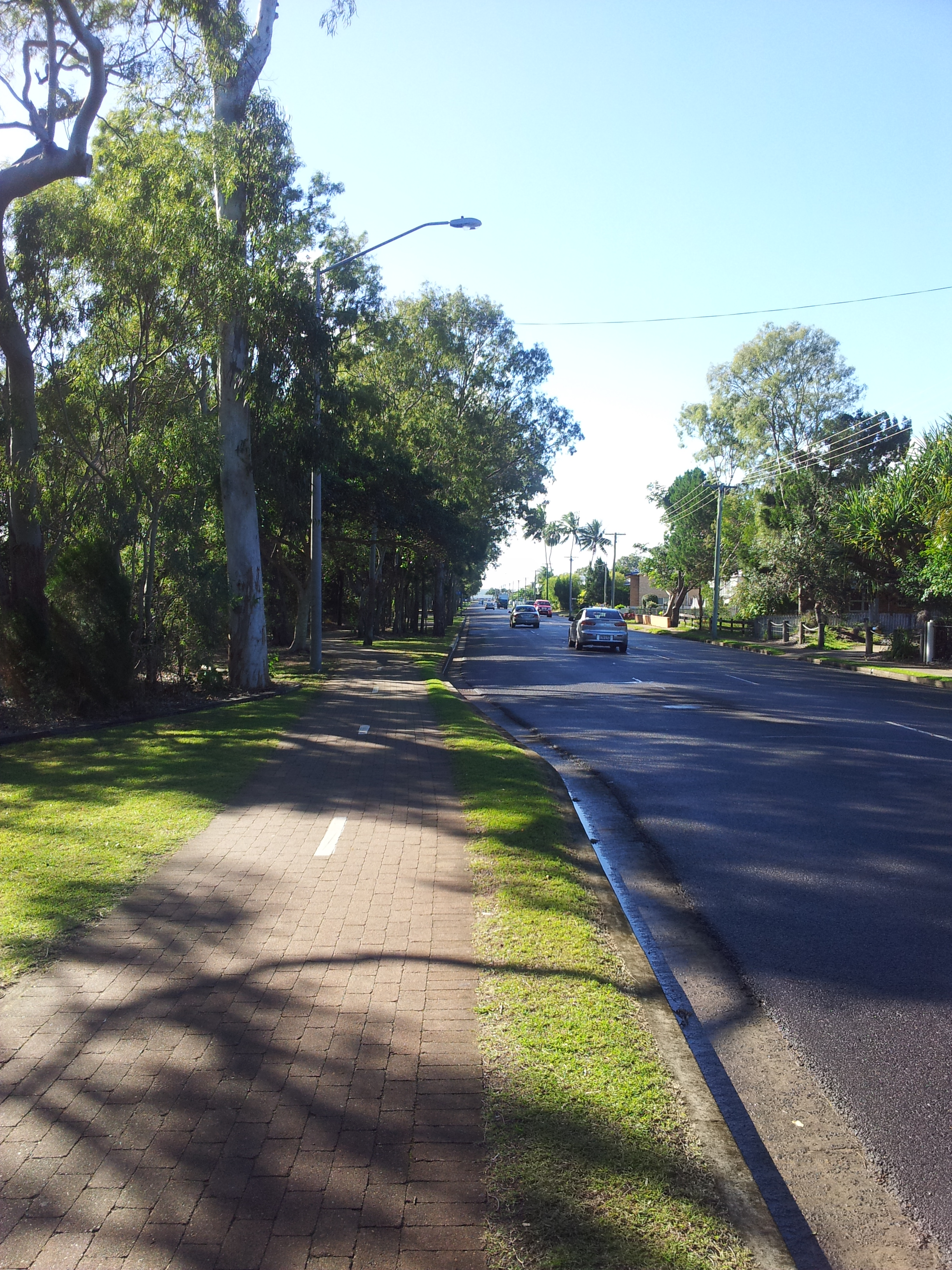
The Esplanade, leading to Urangan from Hervey Bay

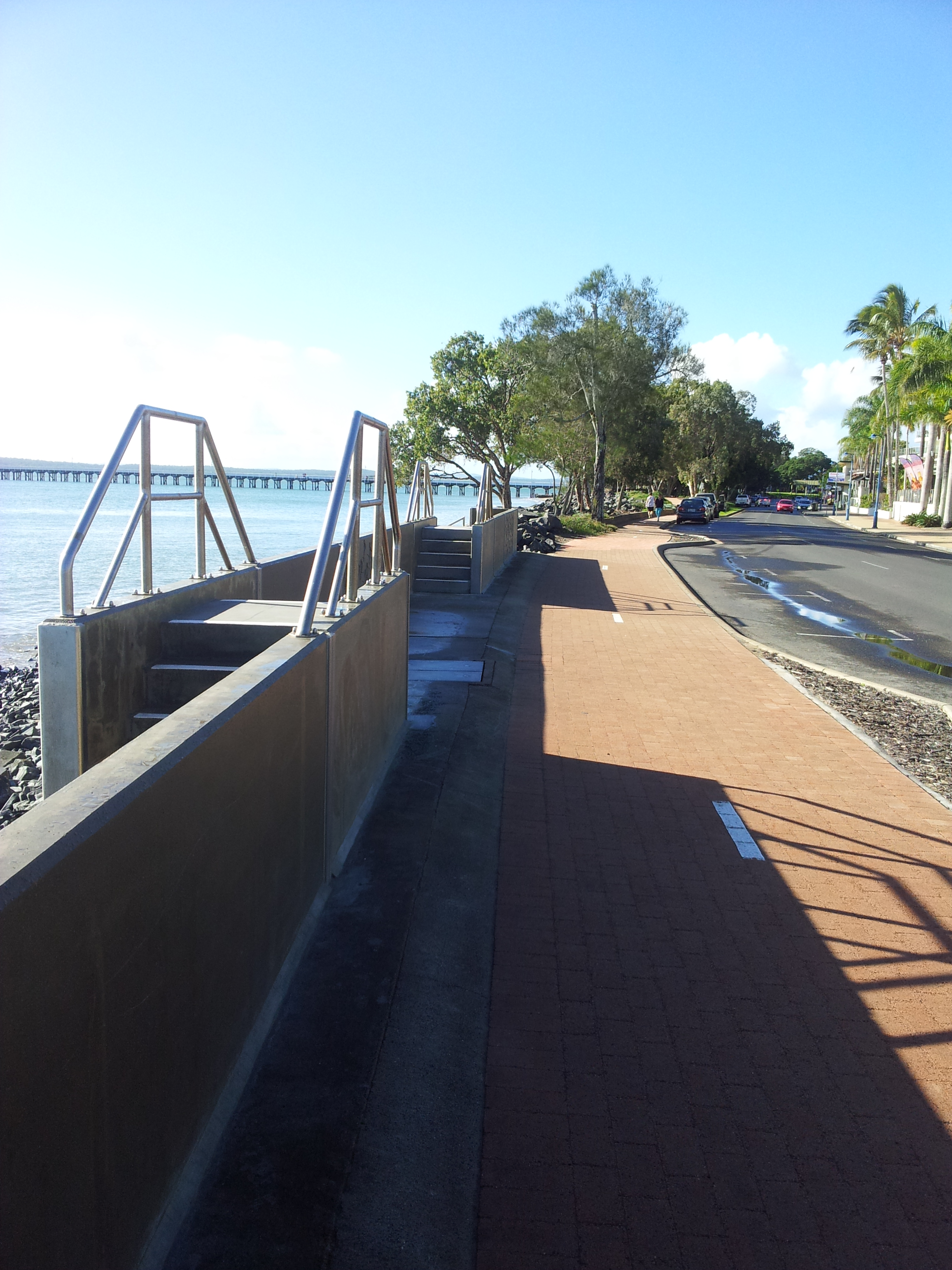
Urangan seawall and Urangan Pier in the background

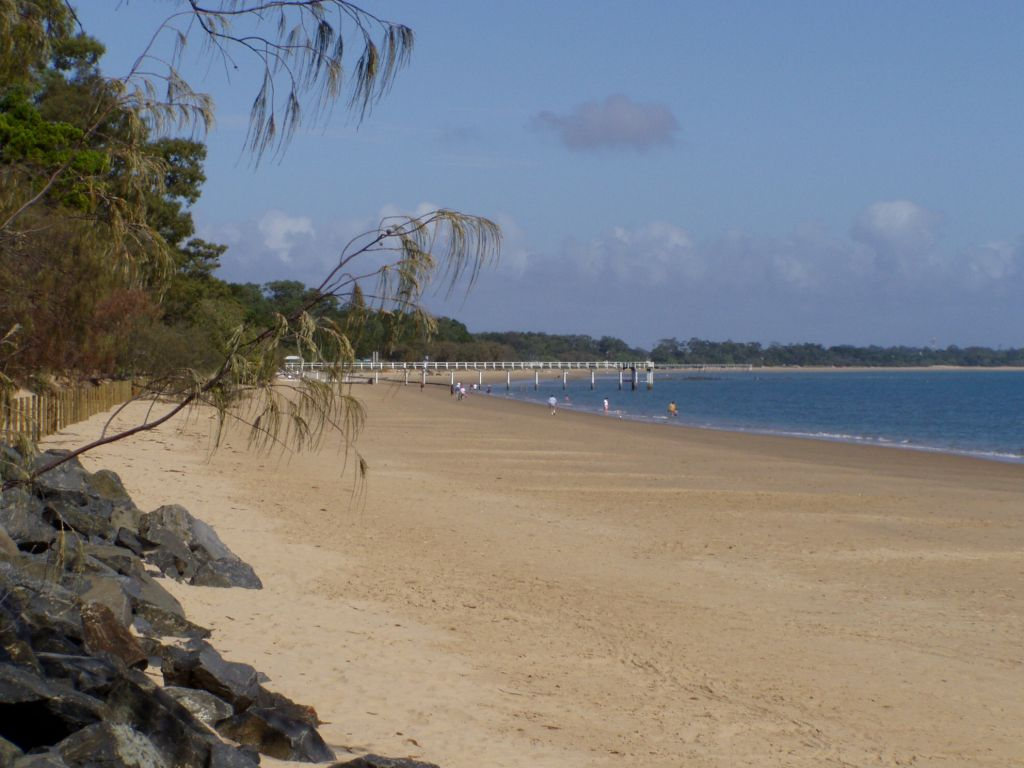
On the beach Hervey Bay looking towards Torquay

Hervey Bay is situated approximately 3½ hours' drive north of Brisbane, via the Bruce Highway and 30 minutes' drive north-east of Maryborough. The city is also served by the high-speed Tilt Train, which has connections from Maryborough West or nearby Howard. The city is served by the Hervey Bay Airport, with direct flights from Brisbane (QantasLink) Sydney and Melbourne (Jetstar Airways). The City of Hervey Bay (now the Fraser Coast Region) has released an airport master plan which includes future provision of a taxiway parallel to the main runway, additional car parking and a larger terminal. The city is also served by passenger ferry to Fraser Island, as well as both scheduled and unscheduled vehicular ferries.

=== Railway ===
Despite Hervey Bay's growing popularity, no plans have been made for a new railway line to the city. The previous passenger and freight line branched off the North Coast main line at Colton, just north of Maryborough. Trains stopped at many stations along the line, but the main stations were Pialba and Urangan. The railway then extended along the Urangan Pier. The line carried out pineapples and local goods from the city. The line was closed in 1993. The tracks from Nikenbah to Urangan were removed and the Pialba–Urangan line was converted into a rail trail. Traces of the railway line are still visible in Urangan. There are two semi-removed crossings (Everything but the tracks was removed) near the end of Pier Street and the track's ballast is still slightly visible from where the mobility corridor ends.

== Governance ==
The Hervey Bay City Council was amalgamated into the Fraser Coast Regional Council in 2008.

Hervey Bay is the largest population centre within the Fraser Coast Region. The current mayor of the Fraser Coast Regional Council is George Seymour first elected in a by-election held in May 2018 and re-elected in the 2020 quadrennial election and again at the 2024 election. A total of ten councillors are elected every four years.

The Electoral district of Hervey Bay has Queensland's second highest share of residents aged over 60.

Hervey Bay is represented in the Parliament of Queensland by Liberal National member David Lee, and in the Commonwealth Parliament by the Nationals member for Hinkler, David Batt.

== Climate ==
Hervey Bay has a warm humid subtropical climate (Köppen: Cfa) with hot, wet summers and very mild, relatively dry winters. Mean maximum temperatures range from 21.8 °C (71.2 °F) in July to 30.3 °C (86.5 °F) in January. The coast is predominantly affected by south east trade winds; keeping the temperatures down in summer and up in winter. Annual rainfall averages around 1,022.0 millimetres (40.24 in), with a maximum in summer and autumn.

Extreme temperatures, moderated by the ocean, have ranged from −1.2 °C (29.8 °F) on 16 July 2007 to 36.8 °C (98.2 °F) on 5 December 2012. Tropical cyclones can affect the town during the austral summer, with Cyclone Hamish (2009) as a Category 5, and Cyclone Oswald (2013) from tornadoes spawned by the cyclone. However, Fraser Island affects weather in Hervey Bay, protecting the marine environment from open ocean storm effects.

Climate data for Hervey Bay (25º19'12"S, 152º52'48"E, 13 m AMSL) (1999–2024 normals and extremes)
Month	Jan	Feb	Mar	Apr	May	Jun	Jul	Aug	Sep	Oct	Nov	Dec	Year
Record high °C (°F)	35.2 (95.4)	34.7 (94.5)	35.4 (95.7)	32.1 (89.8)	29.6 (85.3)	27.6 (81.7)	26.1 (79.0)	29.5 (85.1)	31.2 (88.2)	33.0 (91.4)	34.5 (94.1)	36.8 (98.2)	36.8 (98.2)
Mean daily maximum °C (°F)	30.3 (86.5)	30.2 (86.4)	29.2 (84.6)	27.1 (80.8)	24.3 (75.7)	22.2 (72.0)	21.8 (71.2)	22.9 (73.2)	24.9 (76.8)	26.6 (79.9)	28.1 (82.6)	29.5 (85.1)	26.4 (79.6)
Mean daily minimum °C (°F)	22.0 (71.6)	22.0 (71.6)	20.8 (69.4)	17.8 (64.0)	14.2 (57.6)	11.8 (53.2)	10.0 (50.0)	10.5 (50.9)	14.0 (57.2)	16.9 (62.4)	19.1 (66.4)	21.1 (70.0)	16.7 (62.0)
Record low °C (°F)	16.0 (60.8)	16.6 (61.9)	15.6 (60.1)	7.0 (44.6)	4.0 (39.2)	1.8 (35.2)	−1.2 (29.8)	−0.1 (31.8)	2.9 (37.2)	6.8 (44.2)	9.1 (48.4)	13.4 (56.1)	−1.2 (29.8)
Average precipitation mm (inches)	124.4 (4.90)	133.3 (5.25)	132.2 (5.20)	65.7 (2.59)	98.1 (3.86)	70.0 (2.76)	42.4 (1.67)	47.7 (1.88)	34.3 (1.35)	80.8 (3.18)	71.1 (2.80)	128.4 (5.06)	1,022 (40.24)
Average precipitation days (≥ 1.0 mm)	8.3	9.2	11.0	9.2	9.7	7.7	5.5	3.6	3.8	5.3	6.3	7.9	87.5
Average afternoon relative humidity (%)	61	64	62	62	59	63	55	54	58	60	59	61	60
Average dew point °C (°F)	19.7 (67.5)	20.3 (68.5)	18.9 (66.0)	17.0 (62.6)	13.8 (56.8)	12.7 (54.9)	10.2 (50.4)	10.7 (51.3)	13.6 (56.5)	15.9 (60.6)	16.6 (61.9)	18.8 (65.8)	15.7 (60.2)
Source: Bureau of Meteorology (1999–2024 normals and extremes)

== Localities ==
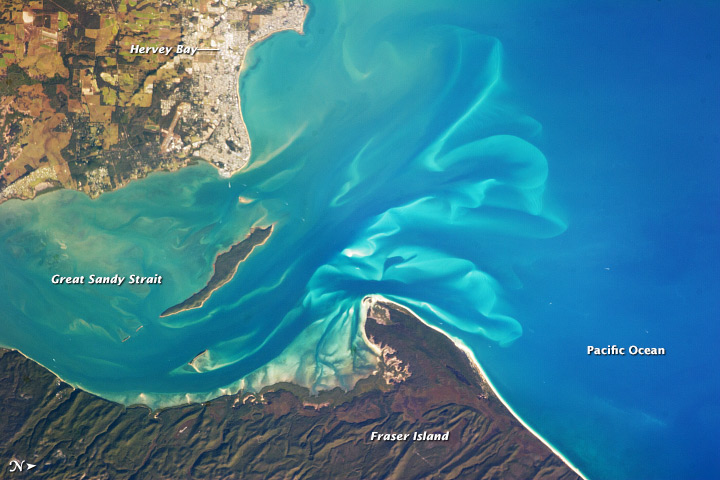
Hervey Bay

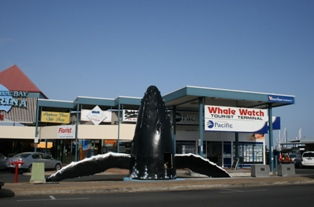
Whale watching tours centre in Hervey Bay Marina

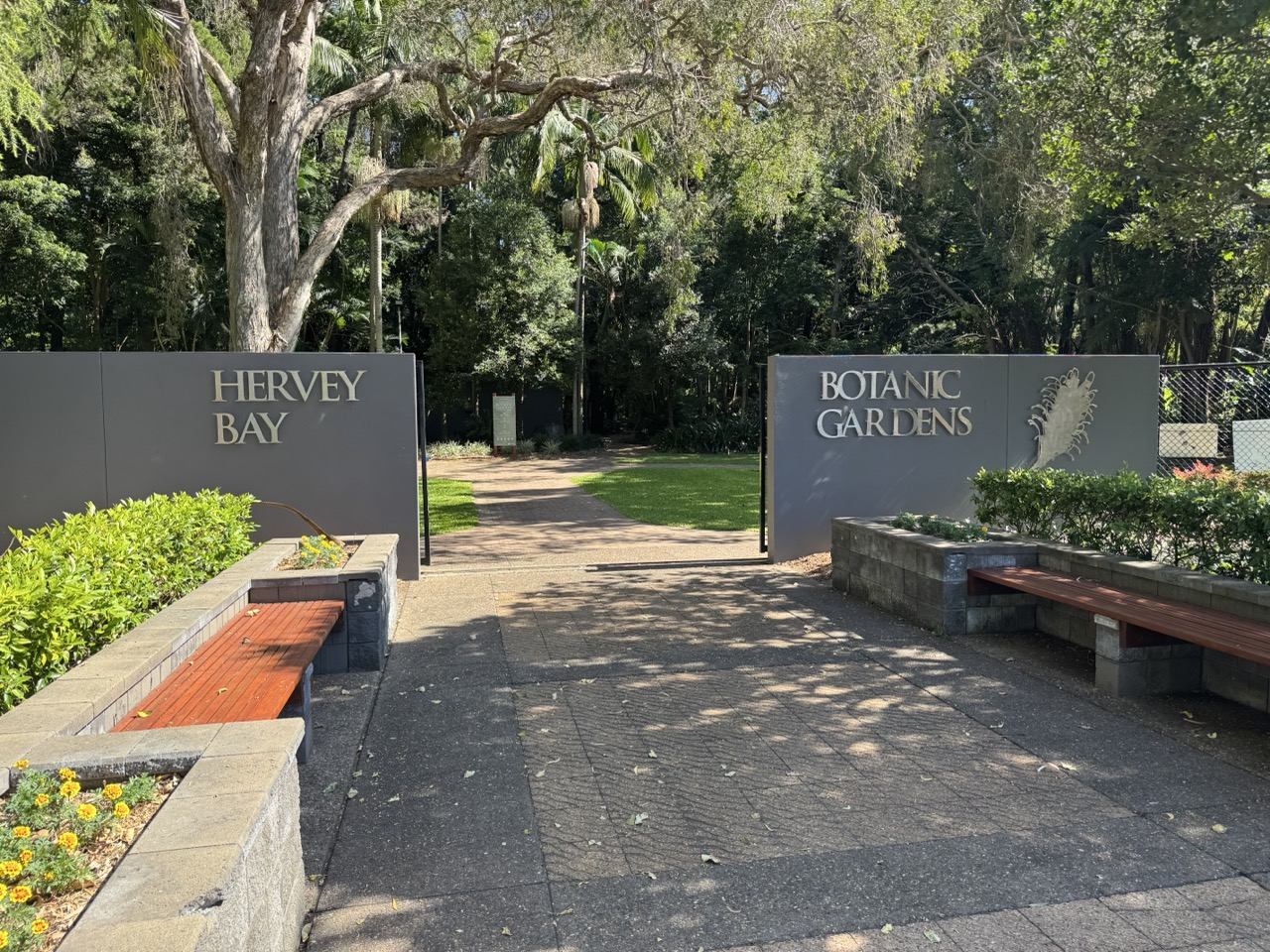
Entrance to the Hervey Bay Botanic Gardens

Hervey Bay began as a dispersed community spread over numerous small, seaside villages. As the area grew, these communities amalgamated and became suburbs . The current urban area includes the following settlements:

- Booral
- Bunya Creek
- Craignish
- Dundowran
- Dundowran Beach
- Eli Waters
- Kawungan
- Nikenbah
- Pialba
- Point Vernon
- Scarness
- Sunshine Acres
- Susan River
- Takura
- Toogoom
- Torquay
- Urangan
- Urraween
- Walligan
- Wondunna

== Education ==
Hervey Bay has 14 schools.

	Pre	Primary	Secondary
Public	Kawungan State School; Urangan Point State School; Yarrilee State School	Kawungan State School; Urangan Point State School; Yarrilee State School; Pialba State School; Sandy Strait State School; Torquay State School	Hervey Bay State High School; Urangan State High School; Carinity Education – Glendyne Education and Training Centre
Private	Fraser Coast Anglican College; Xavier Catholic College; St. James Lutheran College	Star of the Sea Primary School; Fraser Coast Anglican College; Xavier Catholic College; St. James Lutheran College; Bayside Christian College	Fraser Coast Anglican College; Xavier Catholic College; St. James Lutheran College; Bayside Christian College; Hervey Bay Performing Arts College

Hervey Bay also has two Higher Education institutes, a campus of the University of the Sunshine Coast (formerly operated by the University of Southern Queensland) and the Wide Bay Institute of TAFE. and a State Government Special School.

The University of Queensland has a Regional Clinic campus at Hervey Bay for students in their third year of their medical degree.

== Amenities ==
The Fraser Coast Regional Council operates the Hervey Bay Library at 23 Main Street, Pialba.

Wetside Water Park, a free water playground on the Esplanade, is one of the most popular public spaces in Hervey Bay.

The Hervey Bay Regional Gallery is the regional gallery for the Fraser Coast.

LifeChurch Hervey Bay meets at the Community Centre at 22 Charles Street in Pialba. It is part of the Wesleyan Methodist Church of Australia.

== Media ==
Local commercial FM radio stations are Breeze 102.5, Triple M 103.5, Hit 101.9 and Rebel 106.7. Along with a number of other regional Australian newspapers owned by NewsCorp, the Hervey Bay Independent newspaper ceased publication in June 2020.

In April 2022, the Australian Broadcasting Corporation opened a bureau at Hervey Bay to improve its coverage of the Fraser Coast. Staffed by two locally-based journalists, the new bureau on Boat Harbour Drive was opened as part of the ABC's regional expansion.

The Hervey Bay Sun is published fortnightly.

== Commerce ==
Hervey Bay and the Fraser Coast region's largest shopping centre is Stockland Hervey Bay. It is a regional shopping center located in the suburb of Urraween. Stockland acquired the center in April 2011; at the time, it had a floor area of 15,600 square meters and 48 stores. In 2013 Stockland began construction of a $115 million redevelopment that would double the floor area to over 35,000 square metres. The development would include an additional 70 specialty stores and a 500-seat food court, taking the total number of stores to 110.

== Sports ==
Hervey Bay has an active sporting community, with the geography and climate encouraging a diverse range of activities. The natural foreshore area of Hervey Bay has a 14-kilometre (8.7 mi) long bike and pedestrian path that visibly integrates recreational fitness into the environment and community.

Competition sports are generally regional and played against nearby cities, Bundaberg, Maryborough and Gympie.

The calm waters and gently sloped beaches make recreational and competitive water sports popular and accessible. These include sailing, kite boarding, water skiing, wake boarding, kayaking, out-rigging, snorkeling, scuba diving, and ocean swimming.

The Hervey Bay Triathlon started in 1988 and has been raced annually since. The first Hervey Bay Half Marathon was held in 2026 and is now an annual event.

Australian rules football is popular in Hervey Bay. The city has two senior clubs competing in the AFL Wide Bay competition: Hervey Bay Bombers based in Wondunna and the Bay Power based in Urangan. Both field senior men's, women's and junior teams.

The local rugby league team, Hervey Bay Seagulls, are the cornerstone of rugby league in the Hervey Bay area.

== Whale watching ==
Hervey Bay is the whale watching capital of Australia, with humpback whales migrating along the coast between April and October every year. Researchers at The Oceania Project conducted a 25-year study which found the bay was an important social hub for humpback whales. Whale number have increased from about 2,000 in 1992, to around 33,000 in 2018. Hervey Bay is a stopover for mature female humpback whales. Mature females visit Hervey Bay during August in company with the cohort of immature males and females. During September and October Hervey Bay is dominated by Mature females with new calves. The humpback whales are known to be very relaxed in the company of the whale watching vessels. Southern right whales have also been recorded with increasing sighting rates.

== In popular culture ==
The 2023 film 13th Summer was filmed in Hervey Bay as was the 2009 film Subdivision.

== Sister cities ==
According to the Australian Sister Cities Association, Hervey Bay has two sister cities:

- Otsuki (Japan), Japan
- Leshan (China), China.

== See also ==
- Great Sandy Biosphere Reserve
