= Susan River, Queensland =

Susan River
- Suburb
- Interactive map of Susan River
- Coordinates: 25.4136°S 152.7997°E
- Country: Australia
- State: Queensland
- LGA: Fraser Coast Region
- Location: 11.4 km (7.1 mi) S of Hervey Bay; 19.2 km (11.9 mi) NE of Maryborough; 111 km (69 mi) SE of Bundaberg; 281 km (175 mi) N of Brisbane

Government
  - State electorates: Maryborough; Hervey Bay
  - Federal divisions: Wide Bay; Hinkler

Area
  - Total: 71.8 km^{2} (27.7 sq mi)

Population
  - Total: 115 (2021 census)
  - Density: 1.602/km^{2} (4.148/sq mi)
- Time zone: UTC+10:00 (AEST)
- Postcode: 4655
Suburbs around Susan River
Walligan	Sunshine Acres	River Heads
Walliebum	Susan River	Great Sandy Strait
Walliebum	Tandora	Great Sandy Strait

Susan River is a rural locality in the Fraser Coast Region, Queensland, Australia. In the 2021 census, Susan River had a population of 115 people.

== Geography ==
Susan River (the watercourse) enters the locality from the west and flows through to the east where it enters the Mary River. Stockyard Creek enters from the north and flows south-east to join the Susan. The river mouth is split, surrounding Kangaroo Island and Power Island, both of which are in the locality. Several tidal branches join the river near the mouth.

Maryborough–Hervey Bay Road (State Route 57) runs through from south-west to north-west.

== Demographics ==
In the 2016 census, Susan River had a population of 136 people.

In the 2021 census, Susan River had a population of 115 people.

== Education ==
There are no schools in Susan River. The nearest government primary schools are Yarrilee State School in Urraween, Hervey Bay, to the north and St Helens State School in St Helens, Maryborough, to the south-west. The nearest government secondary schools are Hervey Bay State High School in Pialba, Hervey Bay, to the north and Aldridge State High School in Maryborough to the south-west.
