= Craignish, Queensland =

Craignish
- Suburb
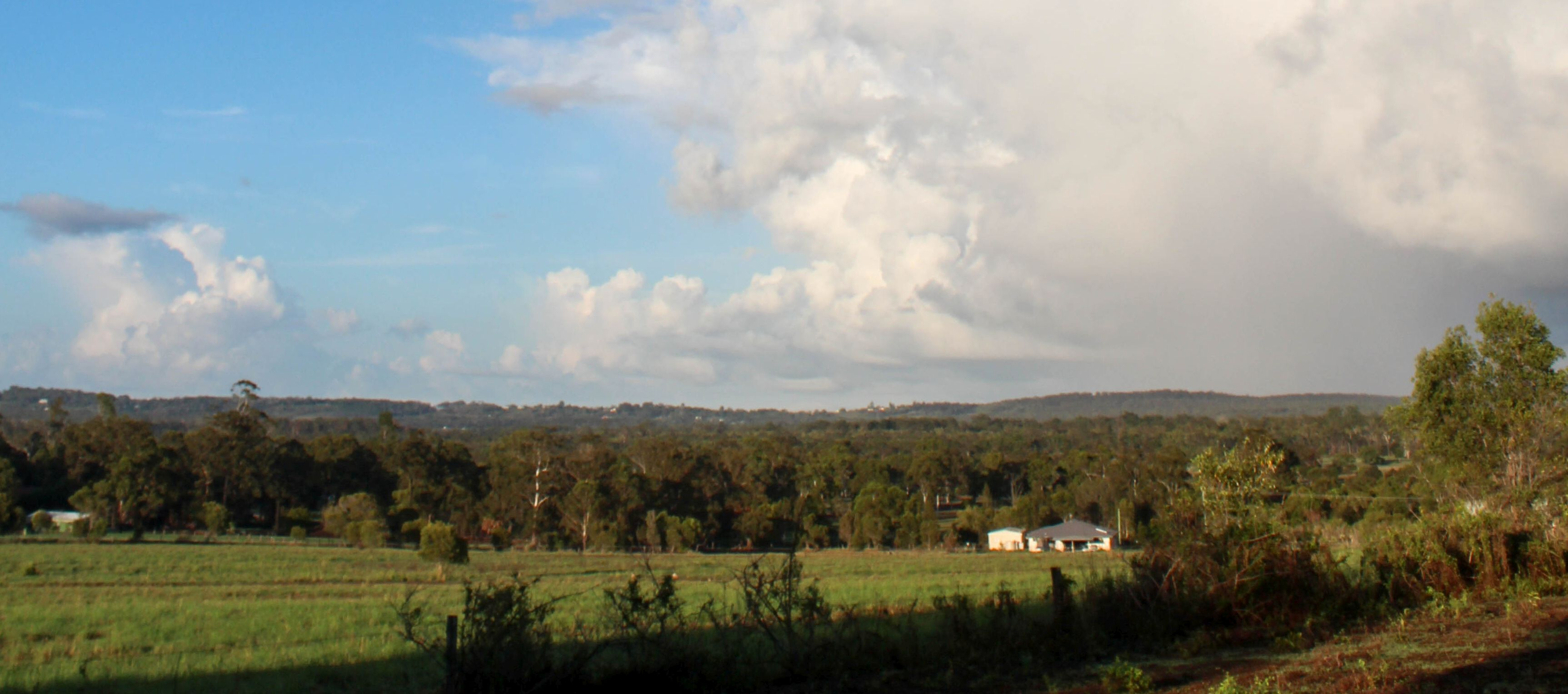
- Craignish landscape, 2017

- Interactive map of Craignish
- Coordinates: 25.2830°S 152.7288°E
- Country: Australia
- State: Queensland
- LGA: Fraser Coast Region
- Location: 4.7 km (2.9 mi) W of Hervey Bay; 34.8 km (21.6 mi) N of Maryborough; 301 km (187 mi) N of Brisbane

Government
  - State electorate: Maryborough
  - Federal division: Hinkler

Area
  - Total: 15.5 km^{2} (6.0 sq mi)

Population
  - Total: 2,190 (2021 census)
  - Density: 141.3/km^{2} (365.9/sq mi)
- Time zone: UTC+10:00 (AEST)
- Postcode: 4655
Suburbs around Craignish
Toogoom	Hervey Bay	Dundowran Beach
Takura	Craignish	Dundowran
Takura	Takura	Takura

Craignish is a coastal locality in the Fraser Coast Region, Queensland, Australia. In the 2021 census, Craignish had a population of 2,190 people.

== Geography ==
The locality is bounded to the west by Toogoom Cane Road, to north-west by O'Regan Creek and to the north by the coast overlooking Hervey Bay.

== History ==
Craignish State School opened on 24 January 1938 on land donated by Mrs Elizabeth (Lizzie) Campbell whose husband Robert had named his property at Dundowran Craignish (a Scottish name meaning rugged rocky place) so the school took this name as a "token of gratitude". The school closed in 1961. It was located at approx 471 Craignish Road (25.2901°S 152.7338°E). This is presumably the origin of the locality name.

O'Reagan Creek takes its name from Maurice (Morry) O'Regan (1835-1920) who was a pioneer timbergetter in the area.

== Demographics ==
In the 2016 census Craignish had a population of 1,827 people.

In the 2021 census, Craignish had a population of 2,190 people.

== Education ==
There are no schools in Craignish. The nearest government primary school is Yarrilee State School in Urraween to the east. The nearest government secondary school is Hervey Bay State High School in Pialba, also to the east.
