= Toogoom =

- Town
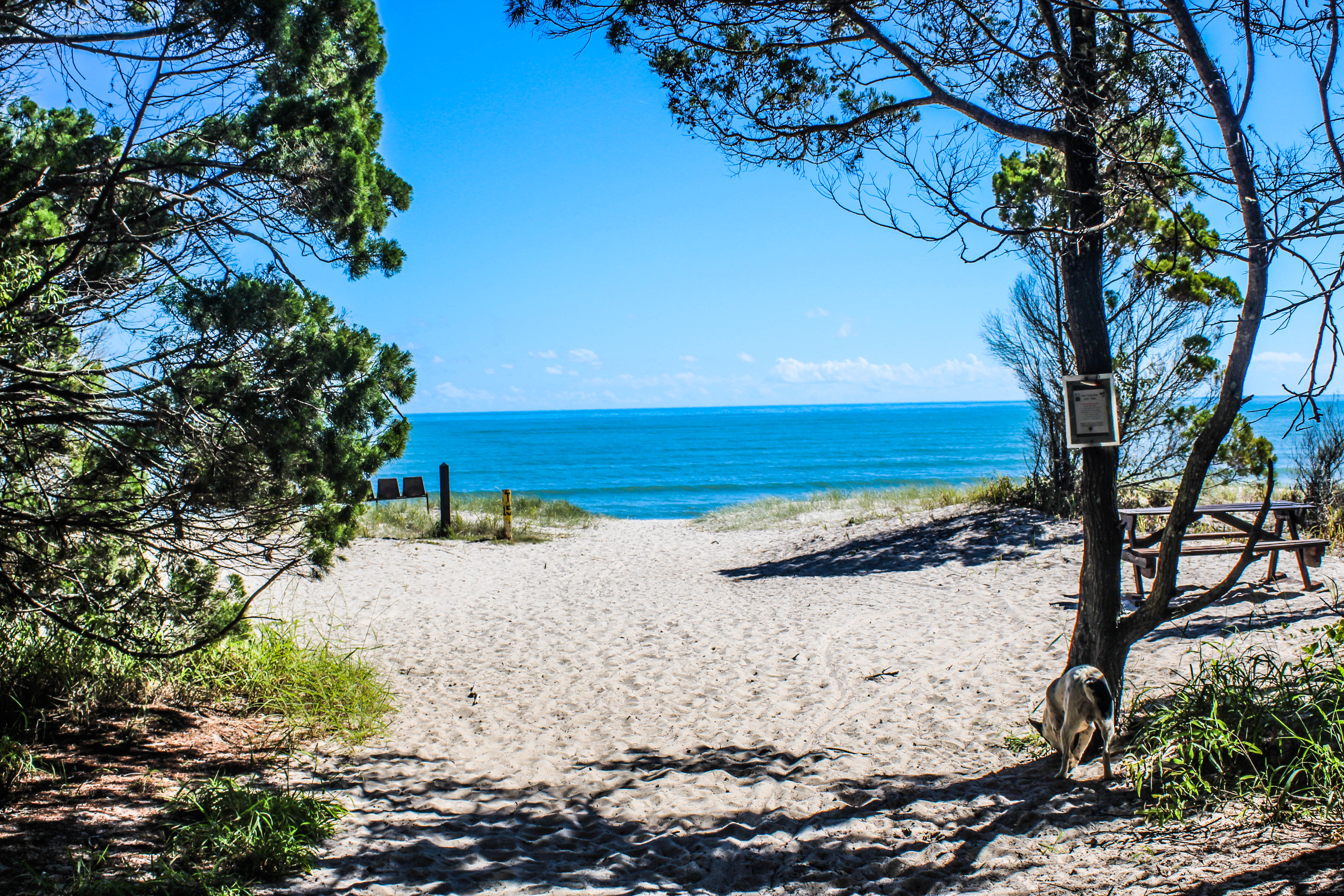
- Toogoom Beach on Hervey Bay, 2017

- Interactive map of Toogoom
- Coordinates: 25.2459°S 152.6710°E
- Country: Australia
- State: Queensland
- LGA: Fraser Coast Region
- Location: 10.9 km (6.8 mi) WNW of Hervey Bay; 40.3 km (25.0 mi) N of Maryborough; 102 km (63 mi) SSE of Bundaberg; 293 km (182 mi) N of Brisbane

Government
  - State electorate: Maryborough
  - Federal division: Hinkler

Area
  - Total: 16.3 km^{2} (6.3 sq mi)

Population
  - Total: 2,596 (2021 census)
  - Density: 159.3/km^{2} (412.5/sq mi)
- Time zone: UTC+10:00 (AEST)
- Postcode: 4655
Localities around Toogoom
Burrum Heads	Hervey Bay	Hervey Bay
Burrum Heads	Toogoom	Hervey Bay
Beelbi Creek	Takura	Craignish

Toogoom is a coastal town and rural locality in the Fraser Coast Region, Queensland, Australia. At the 2021 census, Toogoom had a population of 2,596.

In the 2021 census, the locality of Toogoom had a population of 2,596 people.

== Geography ==
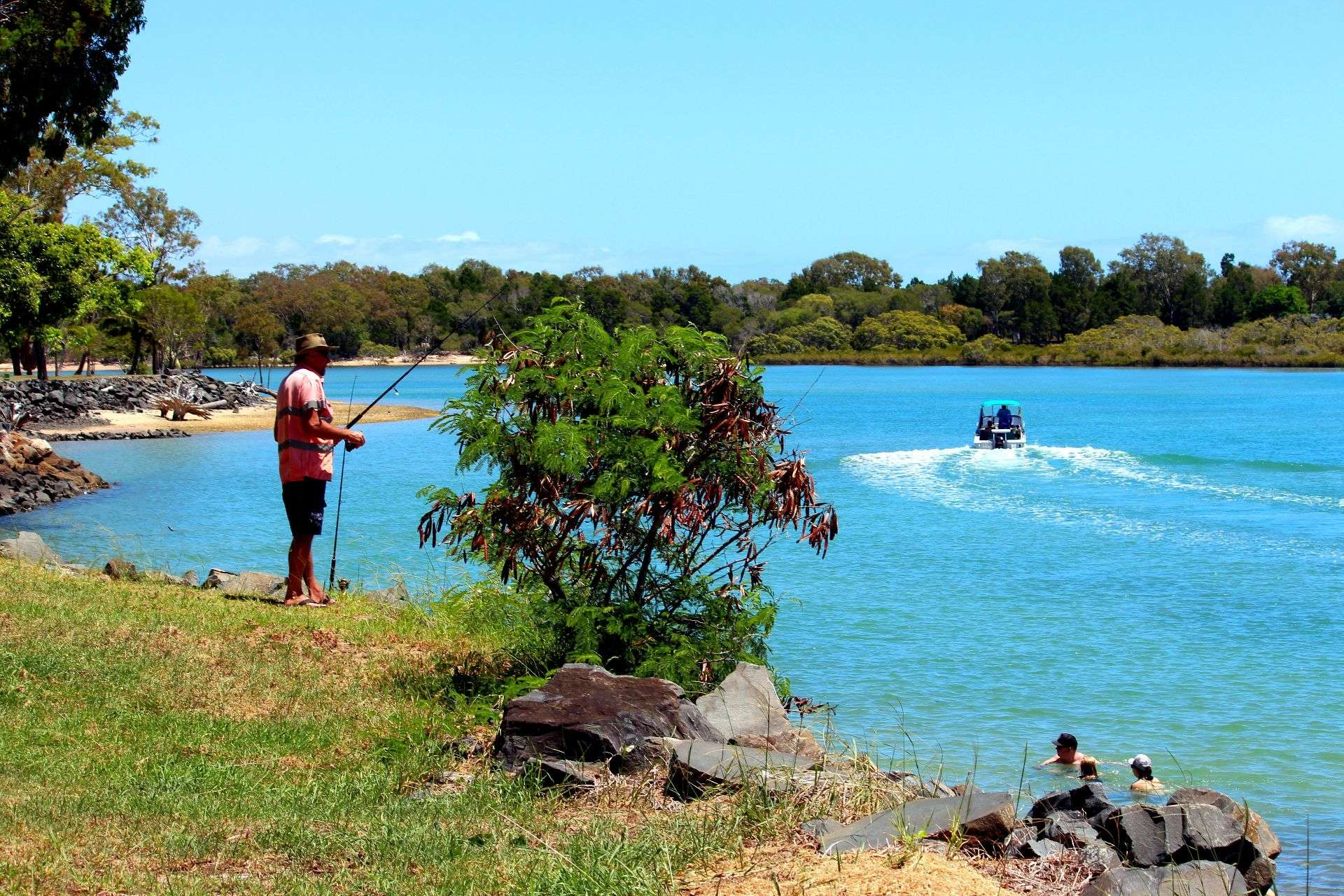
Beelbi Creek, 2017

The locality is bounded to the west by Beelbi Creek, to the north by Hervey Bay and to the east by O'Regan Creek. The town centre is at the most northern area where Beelbi Creek enters Hervey Bay with the residential area extending along Beelbi Creek and along the sandy Hervey Bay coast.

Toogoom Lake (25.2505°S 152.6749°E) and a reservoir (25.2527°S 152.6733°E) are to the south of the residential area.

== History ==
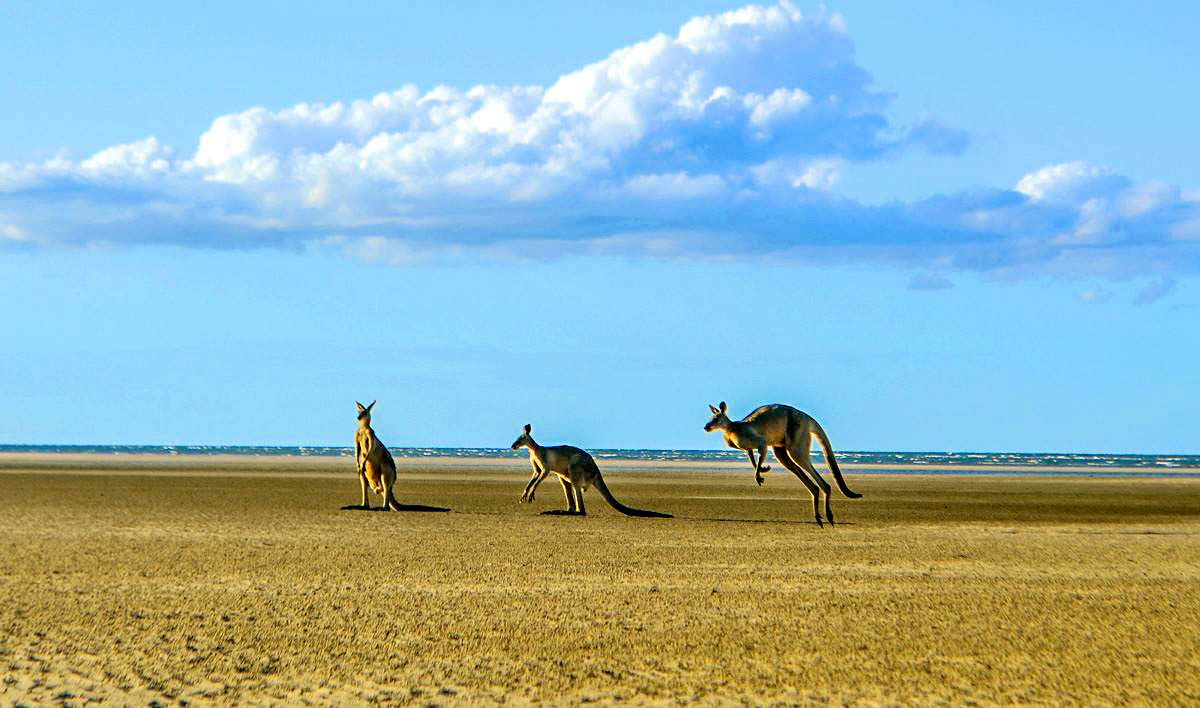
Kangaroos, Toogoom, 2017

In 1877, 11,000 acres (4,500 ha) of land was resumed from the Toogoom pastoral run to establish smaller farms. The land was offered for selection on 17 April 1877.

Toogoom State School opened on 30 January 1918, but closed in late 1923 due to low student numbers. It reopened on 30 January 1934, but closed finally in 1939. It was on Toogoom Road (approx 25.2493°S 152.6658°E).

== Demographics ==
In the 2016 census, the locality of Toogoom had a population of 2,178 people.

In the 2021 census, the locality f Toogoom had a population of 2,596 people.

== Education ==
There are no schools in Toogoom. The nearest government primary schools are Torbanlea State School in Torbanlea to the south-west and Yarrilee State School in Urraween to the east. The nearest government secondary school is Hervey Bay State High School in Pialba to the east.

== Attractions ==
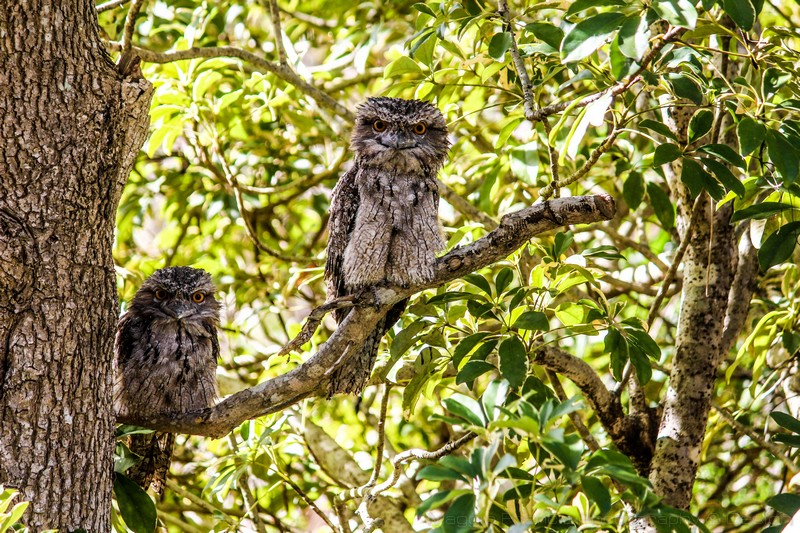
Tawny frogmouths, Toogoom, 2017

The area is known for its sandy beaches. The bay, Beelbi Creek, and Toogoom Lake are all popular for fishing and watersports. Beelbi Creek is good for crabbing.

There is a boat ramp into Beelbi Creek at the end of Toogoom Road (25.2474°S 152.6658°E).

The area features the Toogoom Mountain Bike Trails and Skills Park.

The area is popular with birdwatchers.
