= Takura, Queensland =

Takura
- Suburb
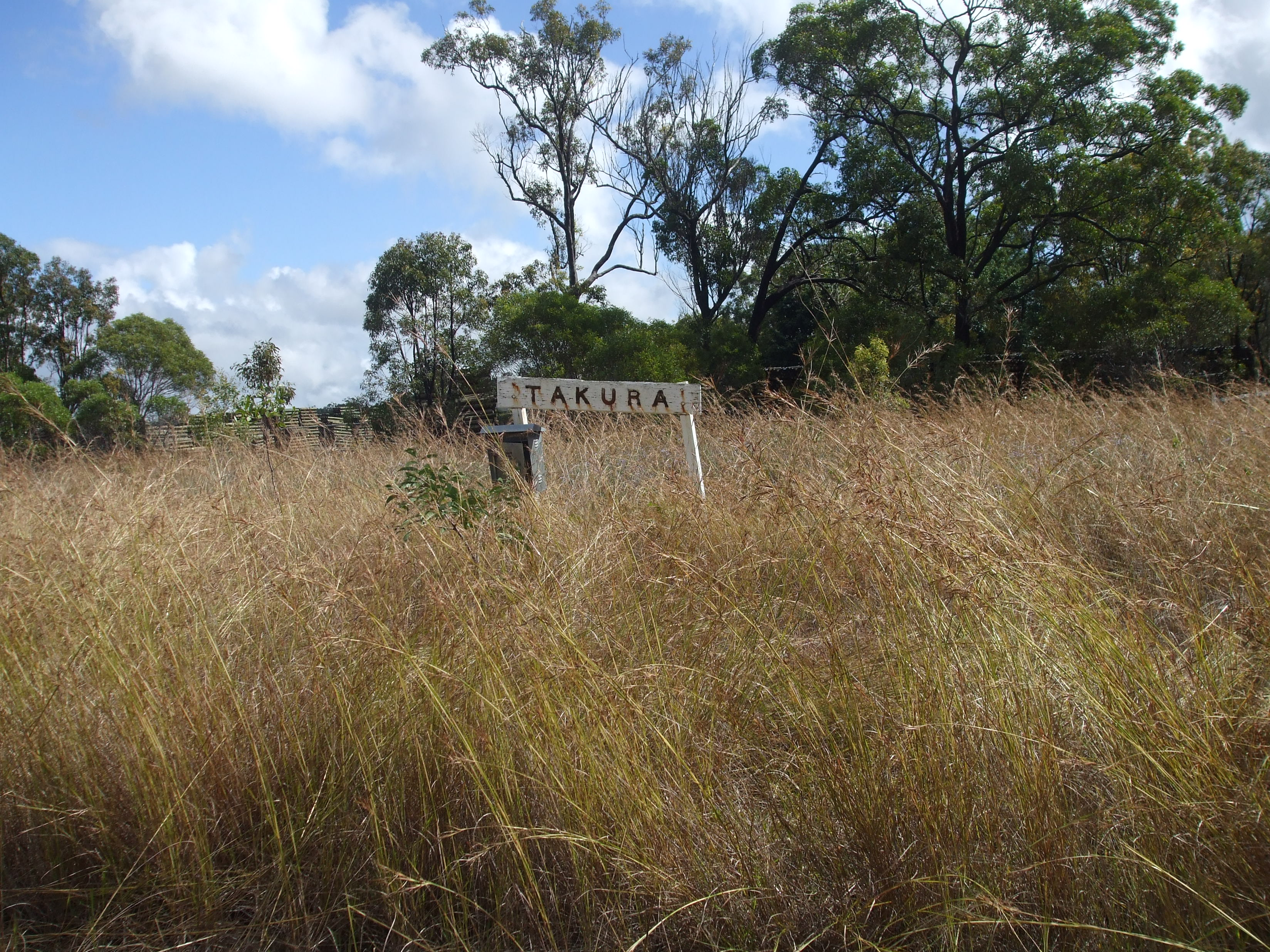
- Takura station nameboard (now in Walligan), 2010

- Interactive map of Takura
- Coordinates: 25.3108°S 152.7038°E
- Country: Australia
- State: Queensland
- LGA: Fraser Coast Region
- Location: 18.4 km (11.4 mi) SW of Pialba; 29.5 km (18.3 mi) N of Maryborough; 101 km (63 mi) SE of Bundaberg; 295 km (183 mi) N of Brisbane

Government
  - State electorate: Maryborough
  - Federal division: Hinkler

Area
  - Total: 52.0 km^{2} (20.1 sq mi)

Population
  - Total: 553 (2021 census)
  - Density: 10.635/km^{2} (27.54/sq mi)
- Time zone: UTC+10:00 (AEST)
- Postcode: 4655
Suburbs around Takura
Toogoom	Craignish	Craignish
Beelbi Creek	Takura	Dundowran
Burgowan	Burgowan	Walligan

Takura is a rural locality in the Fraser Coast Region, Queensland, Australia. In the 2021 census, Takura had a population of 553 people.

== Geography ==
Jacobsons Hill (25.32727°S 152.70568°E) rise to a height of 88 metres (289 ft) above sea level. It is part of the Takura Heights mountain range (25.3074°S 152.6854°E) in the west of the locality. There is a water reservoir operated by the Fraser Coast Regional Council at the top of the hill. At the base of the hill is the Takura Environmental Centre, part of the Takura Environment Reserve, which features a number of walking trails. The reservoir and environmental reserve are on Barnett Road, off Torbanlea Pialba Road.

== History ==
Takura Provisional School opened in 1908. On 1 January 1909, it became Takura State School. It closed on 21 February 1964. The school was at 654-668 Torbanlea Pialba Road (western corner of Takura School Road, 25.32937°S 152.71682°E). As at June 2024, the school building is still extant.

Takura railway station is a now-dismantled railway station (25.3550°S 152.7516°E) on the now-closed Hervey Bay railway line; this is within the present-day locality boundaries of neighbouring Walligan to the south-west.

== Demographics ==
In the 2016 census, Takura had a population of 528 people. The 2021 census later reported a population of 553 people.

== Education ==
There are no schools in Takura. The nearest government primary schools are Torbanlea State School in Torbanlea to the south-west and Yarrilee State School in Urraween, Hervey Bay, to the east. The nearest government secondary school is Hervey Bay State High School in Pialba, Hervey Bay. There are also non-government schools in Hervey Bay's suburbs.

The former one-room Takura School is on the Fraser Coast Local Heritage Register.

== Takura Environmental Reserve ==
The Fraser Coast Regional Council acquired the 56.49ha property on the ridgeline at Takura in 2020 to add to the regional conservation network. Three kilometres of walking trails were then built by the council. At the opening of the trails in 2022, Fraser Coast Mayor George Seymour said “Council bought the land to preserve its environmental values and for the benefit and enjoyment of the community.”

Up to 190 plants and 57 bird species have been identified as having a presence within the reserve, including the Vulnerable Black-breasted Button-quail (Turnix melanogaster), as well as the Noisy Pitta (Pitta versicolour).
