= Dundowran Beach, Queensland =

Dundowran Beach
- Suburb
- Interactive map of Dundowran Beach
- Coordinates: 25.2747°S 152.7677°E
- Country: Australia
- State: Queensland
- City: Hervey Bay
- LGA: Fraser Coast Region
- Location: 9.8 km (6.1 mi) W of Pialba; 9.9 km (6.2 mi) W of Urraween; 32.8 km (20.4 mi) NNE of Maryborough; 293 km (182 mi) N of Brisbane

Government
  - State electorate: Maryborough
  - Federal division: Hinkler

Area
  - Total: 13.2 km^{2} (5.1 sq mi)

Population
  - Total: 2,299 (2021 census)
  - Density: 174.2/km^{2} (451.1/sq mi)
- Time zone: UTC+10:00 (AEST)
- Postcode: 4655
Suburbs around Dundowran Beach
Hervey Bay	Hervey Bay	Hervey Bay
Craignish	Dundowran Beach	Eli Waters
Craignish	Dundowran	Dundowran

Dundowran Beach is a coastal suburb in the Fraser Coast Region, Queensland, Australia. In the 2021 census, Dundowran Beach had a population of 2,299 people.

== Geography ==
The suburb is bounded by the bay Hervey Bay to the north, Grinstead Road to the east, and Pialba Burrum Heads Road to the south.

The land in the west of the suburb is residential while the land is the east is still used for agriculture, a mix of crops and grazing on native vegetation. The northern boundary is a long sandy beach.

== Demographics ==
In the 2016 census, Dundowran Beach had a population of 2,079 people.

In the 2021 census, Dundowran Beach had a population of 2,299 people.

== Education ==
There are no schools in Dundowran Beach. The nearest government primary school is Yarrilee State School in Uraween to the south-east. The nearest government secondary school is Hervey Bay State High School in Pialba to the east.
