= Walligan =

- Suburb
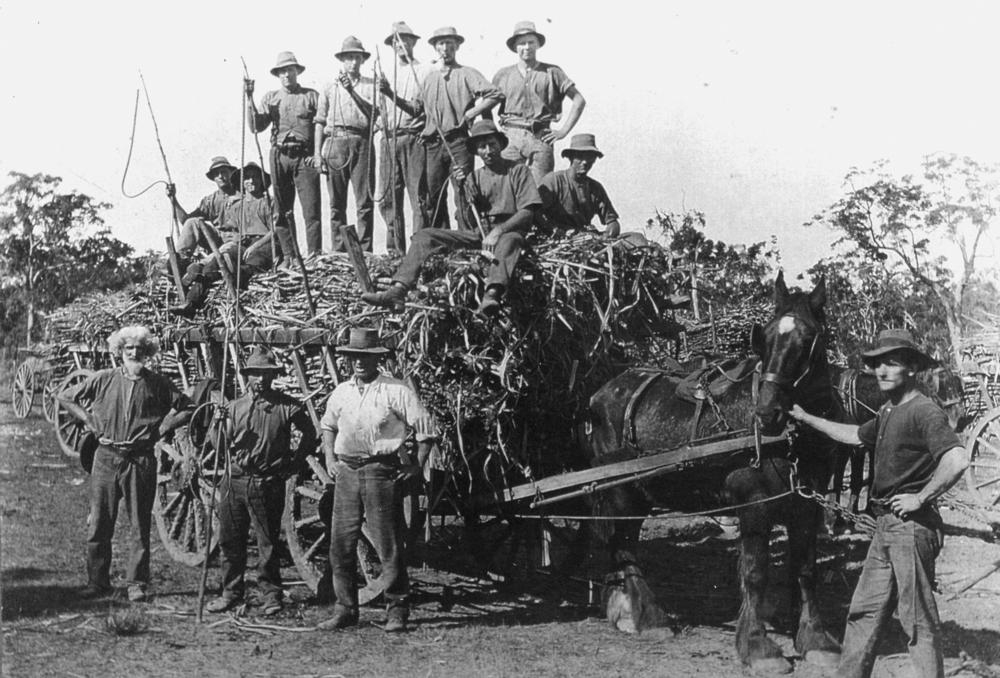
- Farm workers at Walligan railway siding, 1924

- Interactive map of Walligan
- Coordinates: 25.3358°S 152.7705°E
- Country: Australia
- State: Queensland
- LGA: Fraser Coast Region
- Location: 12.3 km (7.6 mi) SW of Pialba; 23.5 km (14.6 mi) NNE of Maryborough; 107 km (66 mi) SE of Bundaberg; 285 km (177 mi) N of Brisbane

Government
  - State electorate: Maryborough
  - Federal division: Hinkler

Area
  - Total: 24.1 km^{2} (9.3 sq mi)
- Elevation: 10 m (33 ft)

Population
  - Total: 447 (2021 census)
  - Density: 18.55/km^{2} (48.04/sq mi)
- Time zone: UTC+10:00 (AEST)
- Postcode: 4655
Suburbs around Walligan
Takura	Dundowran	Nikenbah
Burgowan	Walligan	Sunshine Acres
Walliebum	Susan River	Sunshine Acres

Walligan is a rural locality in the Fraser Coast Region, Queensland, Australia. In the 2021 census, Walligan had a population of 447 people.

== Geography ==
Walligan is relatively flat land approximately 10 metres (33 ft) above sea level. Approximately half of the land is developed freehold land and is used as acreage blocks for semi-rural residences with some agricultural use. The remainder still in government ownership, much of it being part of the Vernon Conservation Park which occupies 684 hectares (6.84 km^{2}; 2.64 sq mi).

Maryborough-Hervey Bay Road (State Route 57) runs along most of the eastern boundary. Torbanlea-Pialba Road runs through from south-east to south-west.

== History ==
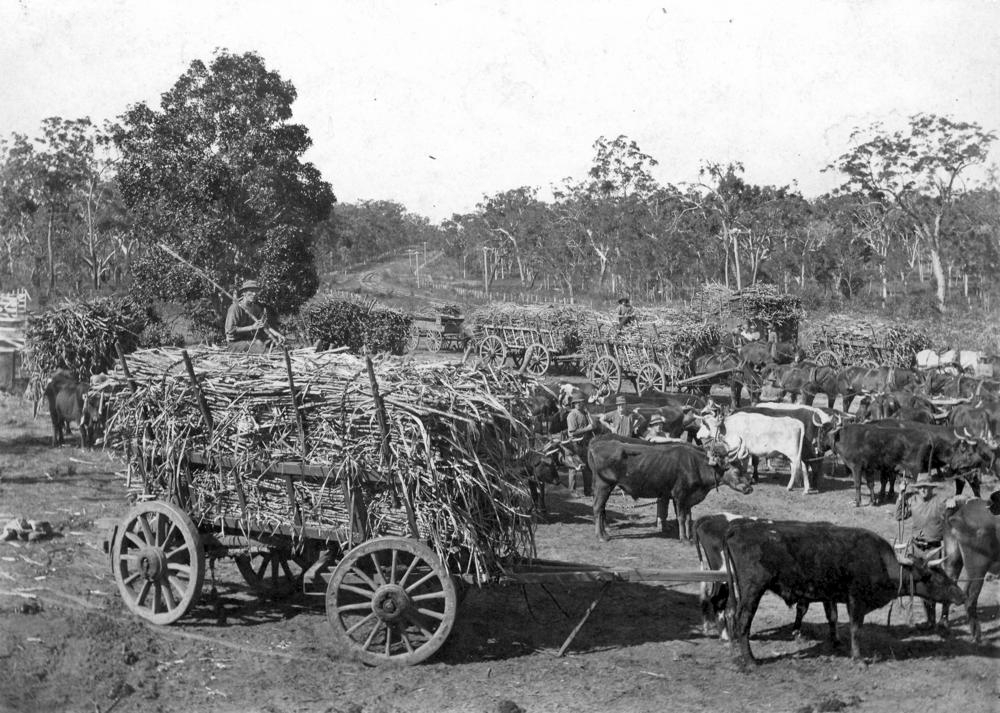
Sugar cane waiting to be loaded onto the train at Walligan railway siding, c. 1924

The Hervey Bay railway line opened in 1896 passing through Walligan with two now-dismantled railway stations:

- Walligan railway station (25.3423°S 152.7708°E)
- Takura railway station (25.3550°S 152.7516°E)

Passenger services ended in 1973, but the line continue to be used for freight until the line was closed in 1993. It is now used as a mobility corridor for pedestrians, cyclists and mobility scooters.

== Demographics ==
In the 2016 census, Walligan had a population of 377 people.

In the 2021 census, Walligan had a population of 447 people.

== Education ==
There are no schools in Walligan. The nearest government primary school is Yarrilee State School in Urraween to the north-east. The nearest government secondary school is Hervey Bay State High School in Pialba to the north-east.
