= Sunshine Acres, Queensland =

Sunshine Acres
- Suburb
- Interactive map of Sunshine Acres
- Coordinates: 25.3566°S 152.7913°E
- Country: Australia
- State: Queensland
- LGA: Fraser Coast Region
- Location: 9.0 km (5.6 mi) SSW of Pialba; 27.6 km (17.1 mi) NE of Maryborough; 113 km (70 mi) SE of Bundaberg; 281 km (175 mi) N of Brisbane

Government
  - State electorate: Maryborough
  - Federal division: Hinkler

Area
  - Total: 14.4 km^{2} (5.6 sq mi)

Population
  - Total: 1,009 (2021 census)
  - Density: 70.07/km^{2} (181.5/sq mi)
- Time zone: UTC+10:00 (AEST)
- Postcode: 4655
Suburbs around Sunshine Acres
Walligan	Nikenbah	Nikenbah
Walligan	Sunshine Acres	Bunya Creek
Susan River	Susan River	Bunya Creek

Sunshine Acres is a rural locality in the Fraser Coast Region, Queensland, Australia. In the 2021 census, Sunshine Acres had a population of 1,009 people.

== Geography ==
Stockyard Creek, a tributary of the Susan River, rises in the locality.

Maryborough–Hervey Bay Road (State Route 57) runs along the western boundary.

== Demographics ==
In the 2016 census, Sunshine Acres had a population of 949 people.

In the 2021 census, Sunshine Acres had a population of 1,009 people.

== Education ==
There are no schools in Sunshine Acres. The nearest government primary school is Yarrilee State School in Urraween to the north. The nearest government secondary school is Hervey Bay State High School in Pialba to the north-east.
