= Pialba Memorial Cenotaph =

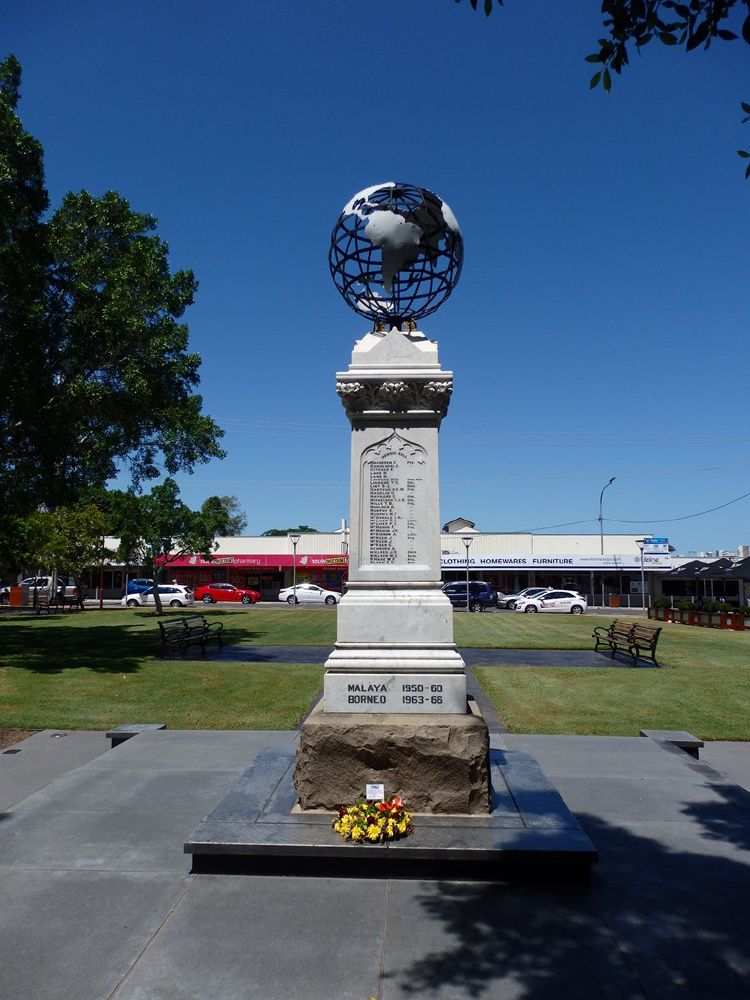
- West side of the cenotaph

- Location within Queensland
- 25.2807°S 152.8389°E
- Location: Freedom Park, Main Street, Pialba, Fraser Coast Region, Queensland, Australia

History
- Design period: 1919–1930s (Interwar period)
- Built: 1918–1921

Site notes
- Architect: Philip Oliver Ellard Hawkes
- Architectural style: Classicism

Queensland Heritage Register
- Official name: Pialba Memorial Cenotaph
- Type: state heritage
- Designated: 6 May 2016
- Reference no.: 650026
- Type: Monuments and memorials: Memorial/monument
- Theme: Creating social and cultural institutions: Commemorating significant events
- Builders: Frederick William Webb

Pialba Memorial Cenotaph is a heritage-listed memorial at Freedom Park, Main Street, Pialba, Fraser Coast Region, Queensland, Australia. It was designed by Philip Oliver Ellard Hawkes and built from 1918 to 1921 by Frederick William Webb. It was added to the Queensland Heritage Register on 6 May 2016. It is also known as the Pialba War Memorial and the Hervey Bay War Memorial.

== History ==
The Pialba Memorial Cenotaph in Freedom Park, Pialba, in Hervey Bay, was unveiled on Sunday 17 July 1921, in honour of the men of the district who left to serve in World War I (WWI), and those who died. Originally sited near the eastern boundary of a railway reserve to the west of Main Street, in the late 1990s the marble pillar on its freestone plinth was moved about 30 metres (98 ft) westwards to its current position, where it was mounted on a modern granite platform, set amongst the paths, grass and trees of Freedom Park. The Pialba Memorial Cenotaph is important in demonstrating Queensland's involvement in a major world event. As a focus for ANZAC Day ceremonies it is highly valued by the Hervey Bay community for its spiritual, symbolic, cultural and social associations.

Pialba is now a suburb of the city of Hervey Bay. European settlement at Hervey Bay began with the establishment of the pastoral run Dalgaroom (16,000 acres (6,500 ha)) in the mid-1850s, and timber-getting commenced in the district in the mid-1860s. Dalgaroom run was reduced to 14,000 acres (5,700 ha) and renamed Toogoom, which was later resumed and surveyed as farming portions from 1870. Farms in the Pialba area grew fruit, maize and potatoes, but they did not prosper until the railway line from Colton railway station (on the North Coast railway line) to Pialba opened on 18 December 1896. Other local industries have included sugar growing and dairy farming. In 1905 Pialba was referred to as "a township and favourite watering place [waterside resort area] for Maryborough", with a population of 292 (1901 census), within a district with a population of 5000. The railway, as well as transporting the produce of local farms, was utilised by seaside excursion trains and special picnic trains, generally run in conjunction with railway employee picnics, originating in Bundaberg, Gympie or Maryborough.

Like all Australian communities, Pialba was impacted by WWI, fought from 1914 to 1918. Of the 330,770 Australians who embarked for overseas service in WWI, 58,961 died and 170,909 were wounded, went missing or became prisoners of war. Even before the end of hostilities, memorials were being erected by Australian communities to honour local people who had served and died. These memorials were a spontaneous and highly visible expression of national grief; substitute graves for the Australians whose bodies lay in battlefield cemeteries in Europe and the Middle East.

Fund-raising for local war memorials was a voluntary community effort, as no State Governments, other than Victoria, made direct grants for local WWI memorials except for the building of halls, hospitals and schools, which were eligible for public money whether or not they were memorials.

WWI memorials took a variety of forms in Australia, including honour boards (from 1915), stone monuments (including obelisks, soldier statues, arches, crosses, columns or urns), tree-lined memorial avenues, memorial parks, and utilitarian structures such as gates, halls and clocks. In Queensland the digger statue was the most popular choice of monument, while the obelisk predominated in southern states.

The argument over whether a war memorial should simply be a monument, or have a utilitarian function, was had all over Australia. Post-WWI, most Australian localities decided on a monumental approach (60%), with only 22% choosing utilitarian buildings (mostly memorial halls) and 18% choosing the compromise position of utilitarian monuments (such as memorial clocks or drinking fountains). After World War II (WWII) the utilitarian form of memorial increased in popularity.

Pialba chose a monument for its war memorial, although some had preferred a memorial School of Arts building. In late 1918 Councillor W Whitaker and Albert Whitford, Member of the Queensland Legislative Assembly, asked the Commissioner for Railways for a suitable site for a memorial "for fallen soldiers", and a site was granted in Station Square, an open area between the Pialba railway station building and Main Street, by August 1918. The location was apt, as many of the men would have departed via the railway station. The Pialba Farewell and Reception Committee (established c.1917) directed the movement, through a memorial committee. The memorial was to consist of a marble monument, with four panels (one on each face of the monument) listing the names of those who enlisted from the district and those who had died.

Pialba's war memorial took several years to realise. The monument's foundation stone, of freestone, was laid by Private Harry Aldridge on 14 December 1918. By this time over £200 had been raised for the memorial by locals, but the delayed arrival of the Italian white marble for the monument's pillar meant the finished memorial was not unveiled until 17 July 1921. During the course of the campaign to erect the monument, the committee responsible met in the local shire hall. The contractor for the monument was Frank William Webb of Maryborough, and the architect was POE Hawkes.

Hawkes, who also designed the Maryborough War Memorial, was born in Wagga Wagga, New South Wales in 1882. He worked as an architect in Wagga Wagga, Perth, Melbourne and Launceston before being employed in a temporary position by the Queensland Government in 1909. He subsequently worked in Maryborough, Bundaberg and Kingaroy, forming a partnership as Hawkes and Palmer in Kingaroy and Maryborough between 1914 and 1917. In 1919 he was employed by the Australian Government as District Adviser, registering as an architect (Qld) in 1930.

The monument's final design included octagonal curbing, and iron posts with wrought iron rails, and these were still extant in a 1950 photo of the monument, which also shows the Pialba Memorial Hall immediately to the north. The base of the marble pillar was inscribed with the words "This stone was erected by the citizens of Pialba and District in honour of the men who served and fell in the great war, 1914-1918", while the panel with the names of the fallen (on the same face of the monument) was headed "In memory of the men who paid the supreme sacrifice in the great war, 1914-1918". The other three panels listed the men "who served at the front". However, articles from August 1918 and July 1921 refer to listing those who had enlisted or volunteered. The names of future wars would later adorn the base of the four sides of the marble pillar: WWII, Korea, Malaya and Borneo, and Vietnam.

At the unveiling ceremony, it was noted that the district had sent 120 men overseas, and 18 had made the "supreme sacrifice"; although the monument currently lists 112 men, of whom 22 died. Mr Huxley Taylor, who had lost two sons at the front, performed the unveiling ceremony, and a German machine gun was also presented to Pialba as a war trophy.

In 1941 the former Pialba Shire Hall was moved to its current location near the cenotaph by the Pialba sub-branch of the RSSAILA for use as a memorial hall. It was located on land purchased from the Commissioner of Railways by the Burrum Shire Council. The hall, which had previously been used on ANZAC Days for gatherings and refreshments, was extended by the RSSAILA.

The use of the land around the cenotaph and memorial hall has changed over time. The last passenger service ran to Pialba station in 1972; the railway reserve was progressively subdivided from 1990; and train services were withdrawn from Pialba in January 1994. The station master's house faced the sea at the north end of the yard (now the northwest corner of Freedom Park) until its removal c.1999. By late 1998 the cenotaph had been moved 30 metres (98 ft) west, as Railway Square was landscaped as part of Freedom Park, which in 2016 covered 0.82 hectares (2.0 acres) of the former railway reserve, including the former railway station building and the memorial hall. The railway station building was also moved westwards, and was rotated 180° to face the cenotaph, which was rededicated on 6 January 1999. A hollow metal world globe with laurel leaves at its base, designed and built by George Pujol, was added to the top of the marble pillar at this time.

A memorial plinth to National Servicemen was dedicated in 2003, north of the cenotaph, and a Light Horse statue and monument was added north of the station building, west of the memorial hall, in 2014 in time for the ANZAC Centenary in 2015. The cenotaph remains the focus of memorial ceremonies.

== Description ==
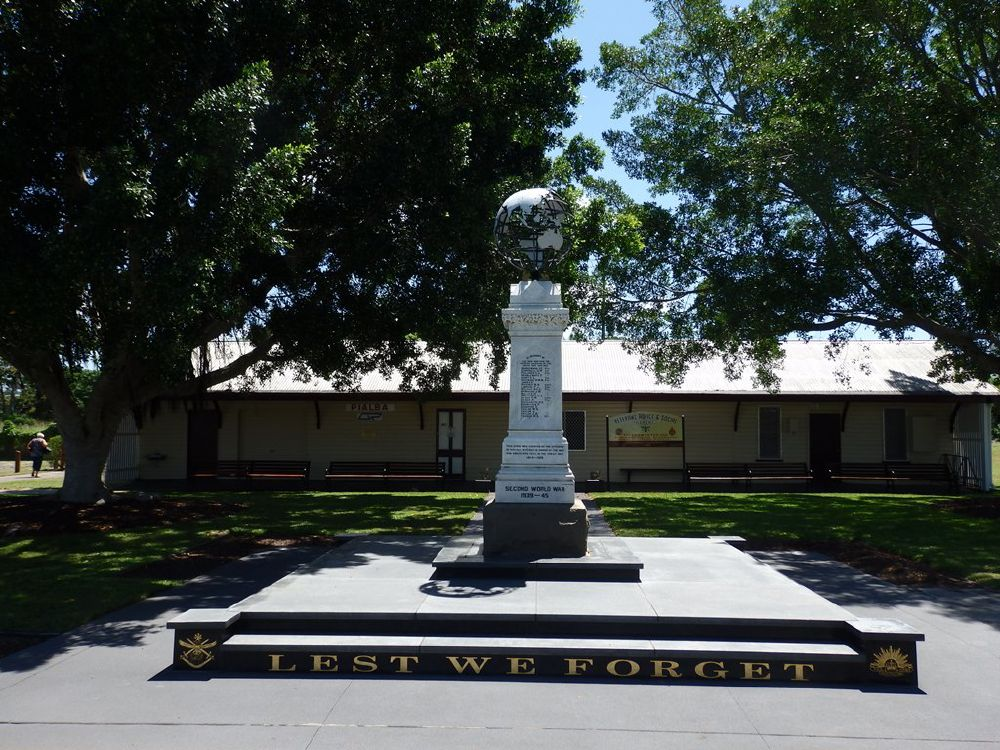
East side of cenotaph with the former railway station building behind

The Pialba Memorial Cenotaph stand within a 0.82 hectares (2.0 acres) area known as Freedom Park, on the corner of Main Street and Charles Street in the suburb of Pialba, in Hervey Bay. The site is bounded by residential properties to the west and commercial premises with parking facilities to the south. The open park setting contains level grassed areas, mature shade trees, and various modern landscaping features and memorial structures.

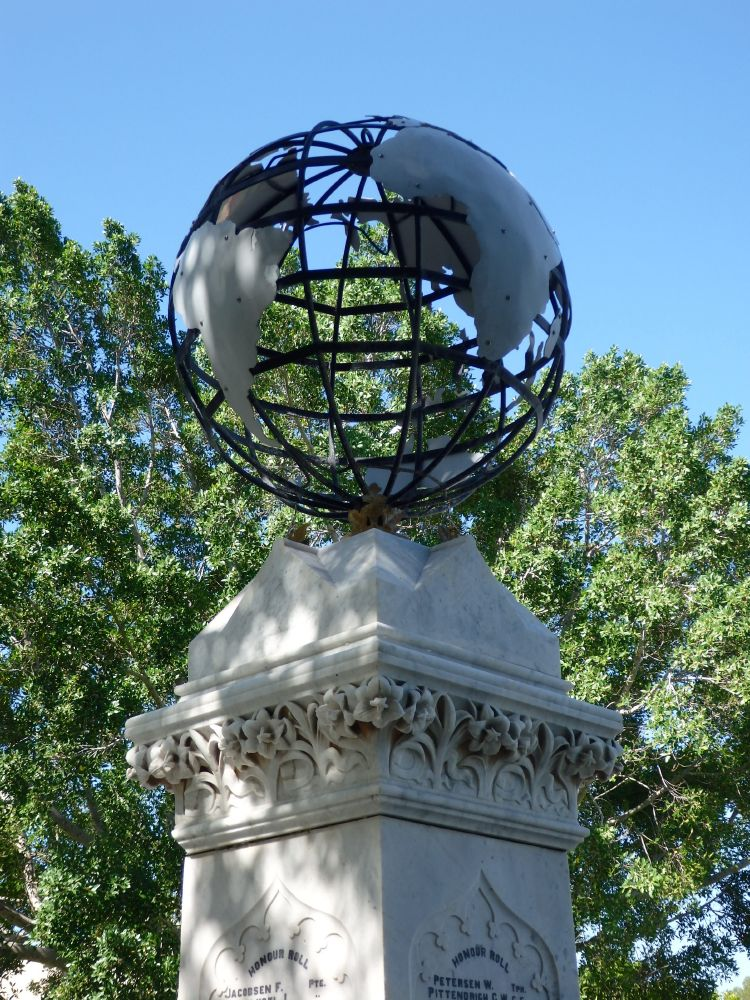
Close-up of the globe added in 1999

Only the cenotaph is considered to be of state heritage significance. The memorial hall is considered to be of local heritage significance.

=== Memorial Cenotaph ===
The Pialba Memorial Cenotaph is located at the southern end of Freedom Park and is axially sited at the junction of modern concrete pathways from Main Street and Charles Street. The memorial consists of a decorative white marble pedestal on a light-brown freestone base, centred on a stepped, dark granite platform.

The squat stone base is square in plan, with rock-faced sides and a dressed top with bevelled edges. The pedestal has moulded, stepped sections and decorative leaded panels to each face, listing 22 men from the district who died (on the east panel) and 90 men who served (30 each on the north, west and south panels) in WWI. The decorative cornice features carved lilies and foliage, and is crowned by a plain carved aedicule with triangular pediments. A metal globe, consisting of a welded frame with the continents attached in sheet metal, has been inserted into the top of the aedicule.

Inscriptions to the bottom of the pedestal commemorate major conflicts including the:

- SECOND WORLD WAR 1939–45 (east)
- KOREAN WAR 1950–53 (south)
- MALAYSIA 1950–60 and BORNEO 1963–66 (west)
- VIETNAM WAR 1962–72 (north)

The east face of the shaft bears the inscription:

"THIS STONE WAS ERECTED BY THE CITIZENS OF PIALBA & DISTRICT IN HONOUR OF THE MEN WHO SERVED AND FELL IN THE GREAT WAR. 1914-1919."

The modern granite platform, metal globe and stencilled concrete paths are not heritage-listed.

=== Landscape Features and Other Structures ===
Mature trees, including figs (Ficus spp.), are located to the west and north of the cenotaph, and to the north of the hall. The relocated former Pialba railway station building is positioned to the west of the cenotaph. A recently dedicated Light Horse Memorial is situated to the west of the hall and various other modern memorial plaques are positioned throughout Freedom Park.

== Heritage listing ==
Pialba Memorial Cenotaph was listed on the Queensland Heritage Register on 6 May 2016 having satisfied the following criteria.

The place is important in demonstrating the evolution or pattern of Queensland's history.

The Pialba Memorial Cenotaph, unveiled in 1921, is important in demonstrating Queensland's involvement in a major world event. World War I (WWI) memorials are a tribute to those who served, and those who died, from a particular community. As the focus of ANZAC Day and Remembrance Day ceremonies, they are an important element of Queensland's towns and cities and are also important in demonstrating a common pattern of commemoration across Queensland and Australia.

The place is important in demonstrating the principal characteristics of a particular class of cultural places.

The Pialba Memorial Cenotaph is a good example of a well-designed and finely crafted WWI monument, funded by public subscription, and is important in demonstrating the principal characteristics of a WWI memorial. The cenotaph, which includes panels bearing the names of those who served and those that fell, represents the empty grave of those from the district who did not return. Its design and decorative treatments include classical references symbolising sympathy and mourning.

The place has a strong or special association with a particular community or cultural group for social, cultural or spiritual reasons.

The Pialba Memorial Cenotaph, funded by public subscription, has a strong and special association with the people of Hervey Bay. Commemorations at the cenotaph reflect the wider reverence felt for war memorials across Australia. As a focus for ANZAC Day ceremonies the cenotaph is highly valued by the community for its spiritual, symbolic, cultural and social associations.
