= Dundowran, Queensland =

Dundowran
- Suburb
- Interactive map of Dundowran
- Coordinates: 25.2983°S 152.7733°E
- Country: Australia
- State: Queensland
- LGA: Fraser Coast Region
- Location: 5.8 km (3.6 mi) W of Urraween; 8.9 km (5.5 mi) WSW of Pialba; 29.6 km (18.4 mi) NNE of Maryborough; 286 km (178 mi) N of Brisbane

Government
  - State electorate: Maryborough
  - Federal division: Hinkler

Area
  - Total: 12.2 km^{2} (4.7 sq mi)

Population
  - Total: 1,085 (2021 census)
  - Density: 88.9/km^{2} (230.3/sq mi)
- Time zone: UTC+10:00 (AEST)
- Postcode: 4655
Suburbs around Dundowran
Dundowran Beach	Dundowran Beach	Eli Waters
Craignish	Dundowran	Urraween
Takura	Walligan	Nikenbah

Dundowran is a rural locality in the Fraser Coast Region, Queensland, Australia. In the 2021 census, Dundowran had a population of 1,085 people.

== Geography ==
Dundowran has mixed land use, including residential, industrial and agricultural (dry and irrigated crops and grazing on native vegetation). There are also two quarries.

== History ==
The name Dundowran might be derived from the Kabi language "thundarun" indicating plum tree, a reference to either the Burdekin plum (Pleiogynuim timorense) or the Davidsons plum (Davidsonia pruriens). However, it might also be named for the Queensland kauri pine (Agathis robusta).

Dundowran Provisional School opened on 28 September 1891, becoming Dundowran State School on 1 January 1909. It closed in December 1960. The school was initially located on the "Red Road" (the sloping road from the Dundowran Hall to Nikenbah) but was later moved a mile away to a location near the entrance of the quarry.

== Demographics ==
In the 2016 census, Dundowran had a population of 909 people.

In the 2021 census, Dundowran had a population of 1,085 people.

== Heritage listings ==
Dundowran has a number of heritage-listed sites, including:

- 166 Craignish Road: Gallagher and Bagnell grave site
- 407 Lower Mountain Road: Dundowran Recreational Hall

== Education ==
There are no schools in Dundowran. The nearest government primary school is Yarrilee State School in Uraween to the east. The nearest government secondary school is Hervey Bay State High School in Pialba to the north-east.
