= Point Vernon, Queensland =

Suburb of Queensland, Australia

Point Vernon
- Suburb
- Interactive map of Point Vernon
- Coordinates: 25.2538°S 152.8177°E
- Country: Australia
- State: Queensland
- City: Hervey Bay
- LGA: Fraser Coast Region
- Location: 4.0 km (2.5 mi) NNW of Piabla; 36.5 km (22.7 mi) NE of Maryborough; 119 km (74 mi) SE of Bundaberg; 304 km (189 mi) N of Brisbane

Government
  - State electorate: Hervey Bay
  - Federal division: Hinkler

Area
  - Total: 5.8 km^{2} (2.2 sq mi)

Population
  - Total: 5,718 (2021 census)
  - Density: 986/km^{2} (2,553/sq mi)
- Time zone: UTC+10:00 (AEST)
- Postcode: 4655
Suburbs around Point Vernon
Hervey Bay	Hervey Bay	Hervey Bay
Hervey Bay	Point Vernon	Hervey Bay
Eli Waters	Pialba	Hervey Bay

Point Vernon is a coastal suburb in the Fraser Coast Region, Queensland, Australia. In the 2021 census, Point Vernon had a population of 5,718 people.

== History ==
The suburb was named after headland Point Vernon, which was in turn named by Richard Bingham Sheridan (the Harbour Master of Maryborough) in 1861 after Captain Charles Egerton Harcourt-Vernon, the commander of HMS Cordelia, which conveyed the first Governor of Queensland, George Bowen, to Queensland in 1859.

Dunn's Enclosure was built by Andrew Dunn in the 1920s as an enclosed swimming spot on the beach at Point Vernon. It is on the Fraser Coast Local Heritage Register and was nominated for inclusion by George Seymour when he was deputy mayor of the Fraser Coast Regional Council.

== Demographics ==
In the 2016 census, Point Vernon had a population of 5,699 people.

In the 2021 census, Point Vernon had a population of 5,718 people.

== Education ==
There are no schools in Point Vernon. The nearest government primary school is Pialba State School in neighbouring Pialba to the south. The nearest government secondary school is Hervey Bay State High School, also in Piabla.

== Amenities ==
The Halcro Street Community Garden and community radio station Fraser Coast FM are located in Point Vernon at the Halcro Street Community Centre.

The Point Vernon/Pialba branch of the Queensland Country Women's Association meets at the QCWA Rooms at 7 Torquay Road, Pialba.

== Facilities ==
Polson Cemetery is at 89 Corser Street (25.2520°S 152.8135°E). It includes the South Sea Islander Memorial and Cemetery. It is operated by the Fraser Coast Regional Council.

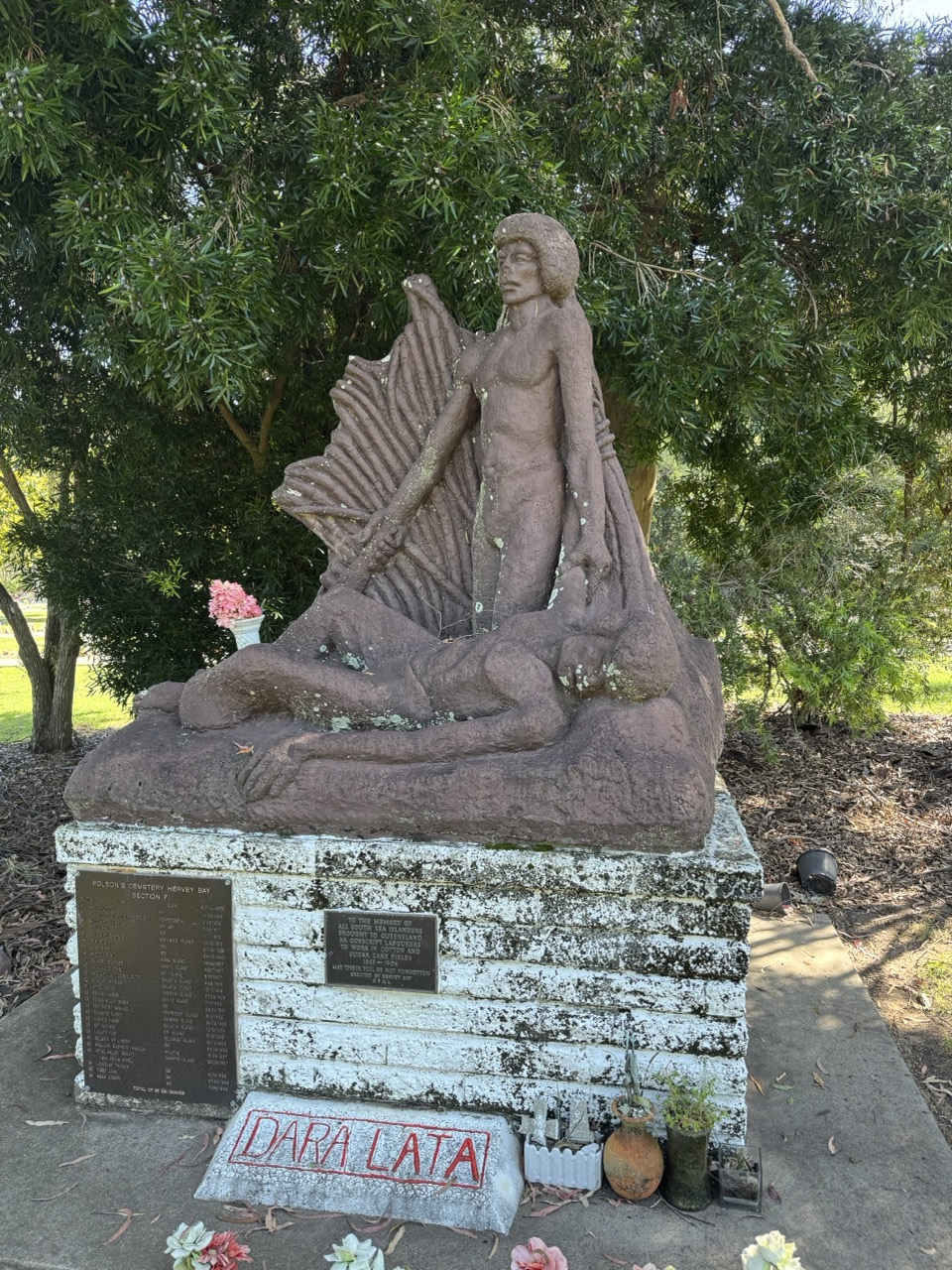
The Australian South Sea Islander memorial is in Polson Cemetery at Point Vernon, Queensland.
