= Nikenbah, Queensland =

Nikenbah
- Town
- Interactive map of Nikenbah
- Coordinates: 25.315°S 152.8072°E
- Country: Australia
- State: Queensland
- LGA: Fraser Coast Region
- Location: 5.2 km (3.2 mi) S of Pialba; 10.1 km (6.3 mi) WSW of Urangan; 28.5 km (17.7 mi) NE of Maryborough; 282 km (175 mi) N of Brisbane

Government
  - State electorates: Maryborough; Hervey Bay
  - Federal division: Hinkler

Area
  - Total: 23.4 km^{2} (9.0 sq mi)

Population
  - Total: 1,234 (2021 census)
  - Density: 52.74/km^{2} (136.6/sq mi)
- Time zone: UTC+10:00 (AEST)
- Postcode: 4655
Localities around Nikenbah
Dundowran	Urraween	Kawungan
Walligan	Nikenbah	Wondunna
Sunshine Acres	Bunya Creek	Booral

Nikenbah is a rural town and locality in the Fraser Coast Region, Queensland, Australia. In the 2021 census, the locality of Nikenbah had a population of 1,234 people.

== History ==
The town was originally named Aalberg by Danish settlers. However, by 1883, it had acquired the name Nikenbah, which is a corruption of Aboriginal words (Kabi language), nguruin meaning emu and ba meaning place.

Nikenbah State School opened on 27 May 1913 and closed in 1963.

Glendyne Education and Training Centre opened in Nikenbah in 2002 as a special assistance school for children who are unsuited to mainstream schooling. It is operated by Carinity (formerly Queensland Baptist Care).

== Demographics ==
In the 2016 census, the locality of Nikenbah had a population of 657 people.

In the 2021 census, the locality of Nikenbah had a population of 1,234 people.

== Education ==
Glendyne Education and Training Centre is a private primary and secondary (6-12) special school for boys and girls at 72 Nikenbah-Dundowran Road (25.3135°S 152.7972°E). In 2018, the school had an enrolment of 116 students with 12 teachers (10 full-time equivalent) and 18 non-teaching staff (14 full-time equivalent).

There are no mainstream schools in Nikenbah. The nearest government primary schools are Yarrilee State School in neighbouring Urraween to the north and Kawungan State School in neighbouring Kawungan to the north-east. The nearest government secondary schools are Hervey Bay State High School in Pialba to the north and Urangan State High School in Urangan to the north-east.

== Amenities ==
The Fraser Coast Sports and Recreation Precinct is located at Woods Road, Nikenbah. It was officially opened by Fraser Coast mayor George Seymour in February 2019 and provides facilities for football, netball, cycling, OzTag and basketball. The football fields have been used as a training ground for the Brisbane Roar and Queensland Reds.

The Nikenbah Historical Railway Village operates a model railway with historic railway buildings from the region.

The Hervey Bay Baptist Church is at 20 Nikenbah-Dundowran Road (25.31125°S 152.80251°E). It is planned to establish a senior school campus of the Hervey Bay Christian College (a Baptist Church school in Urraween) on the same site as the church.

== Cemeteries ==
There are two cemeteries in Nikenbah, the Aalborg Danish cemetery and the Natural Burial cemetery.
