= Eli Waters, Queensland =

Eli Waters
- Suburb
- Interactive map of Eli Waters
- Coordinates: 25.2761°S 152.8038°E
- Country: Australia
- State: Queensland
- LGA: Fraser Coast Region
- Location: 3.2 km (2.0 mi) W of Pialba; 33.6 km (20.9 mi) NW of Maryborough; 292 km (181 mi) N of Brisbane

Government
  - State electorate: Hervey Bay
  - Federal division: Hinkler

Area
  - Total: 7.4 km^{2} (2.9 sq mi)

Population
  - Total: 3,758 (2021 census)
  - Density: 508/km^{2} (1,315/sq mi)
- Time zone: UTC+10:00 (AEST)
- Postcode: 4655
Suburbs around Eli Waters
Hervey Bay	Point Vernon	Point Vernon
Dundowran Beach	Eli Waters	Pialba
Dundowran	Urraween	Urraween

Eli Waters is a coastal suburb of Hervey Bay in the Fraser Coast Region, Queensland, Australia. In the 2021 census, Eli Waters had a population of 3,758 people.

== Geography ==
The suburb is bounded to the north by the bay. The land in the northern part of the suburb is undeveloped wetlands with the suburban development in the south of the locality. Some of the west of the locality is used for grazing.

Eli Creek (from which the suburb presumably takes its name) flows through the locality from Uraween to the south through to the bay in the north of the locality. A number of artificial lakes have been constructed within the suburban area.

== History ==
Xavier Catholic College opened on 29 January 2003 with 90 Year 8 students. The school was named in honour of St Francis Xavier. In In 2007, it expanded to offer primary schooling with an initial intake of students into Prep to Year 3.

== Demographics ==
In the 2016 census, Eli Waters had a population of 3,310 people.

In the 2021 census, Eli Waters had a population of 3,758 people.

== Education ==
Xavier Catholic College is a Catholic primary and secondary (Prep-12) school for boys and girls at 1 Wide Bay Drive (25.2863°S 152.8050°E). In 2017, the school had an enrolment of 1,065 students with 82 teachers (75 full-time equivalent) and 49 non-teaching staff (33 full-time equivalent).

The nearest government primary school is Yarrilee State School in neighbouring Uraween to the south. The nearest government secondary school is Hervey Bay State High School in neighbouring Pialba to the east.
