= Urraween, Queensland =

Urraween
- Suburb
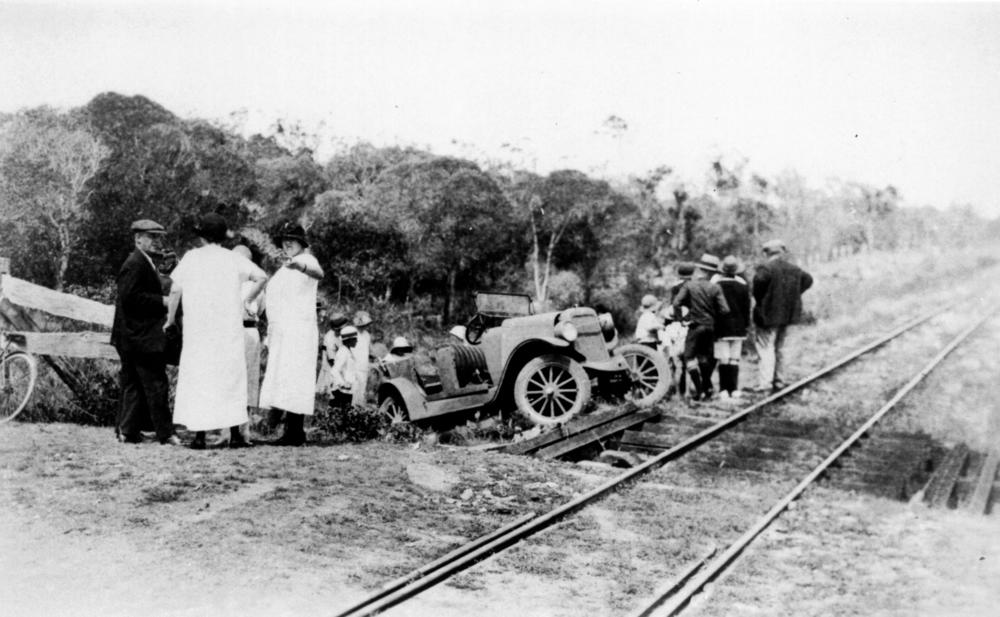
- Car accident on the railway line at Urraween, 1925

- Interactive map of Urraween
- Coordinates: 25.2955°S 152.8219°E
- Country: Australia
- State: Queensland
- City: Hervey Bay
- LGA: Fraser Coast Region
- Location: 1.4 km (0.87 mi) SW of Pialba; 32.9 km (20.4 mi) NE of Maryborough; 286 km (178 mi) N of Brisbane

Government
  - State electorates: Hervey Bay; Maryborough
  - Federal division: Hinkler

Area
  - Total: 7.5 km^{2} (2.9 sq mi)

Population
  - Total: 7,951 (2021 census)
  - Density: 1,060/km^{2} (2,746/sq mi)
- Time zone: UTC+10:00 (AEST)
- Postcode: 4655
Suburbs around Urraween
Eli Waters	Pialba	Pialba
Dundowran	Urraween	Kawungan
Nikenbah	Nikenbah	Kawungan

Urraween is a suburb of Hervey Bay in the Fraser Coast Region, Queensland, Australia. In the 2021 census, Urraween had a population of 7,951 people.

== Geography ==
The Maryborough - Hervey Bay Road enters through the suburb from the south-west (Nikenbah) and terminates at the junction with Boat Harbour Drive, which forms the suburb's northern boundary with Pialba.

The land use is predominantly residential suburban housing with associated services and utilities.

== History ==
The name Urraween is derived from Kabi words ngur/uin meaning place of emus.

Prior to the development of Urraween the lands were used for agriculture which included a pineapple farm.

The Hervey Bay railway line opened to Pialba in 1896 and was extended to Urangan in 1913 and to the end of the Urangan Pier in 1917, along with the opening of the pier. The line was closed in 1993. The Urraween area was served by two now-dismantled railway stations (from west to east):

- Urraween railway station (25.3008°S 152.8204°E)
- Kawungan railway station (25.3015°S 152.8344°E)

Hervey Bay Christian Academy opened in 1993.

Yarrilee State School opened in January 2000.

St James Lutheran College opened on 27 January 2003.

== Demographics ==
In the 2016 census, Urraween had a population of 6,969 people.

In the 2021 census, Urraween had a population of 7,951 people.

== Education ==
Yarrilee State School is a government primary (Prep–6) school for boys and girls at 15 Scrub Hill Road (25.2892°S 152.8046°E). In 2016, the school had an enrolment of 769 students with 54 teachers (50 equivalent full-time) and 33 non-teaching staff (21 equivalent full-time). In 2017, the school had an enrolment of 791 students with 55 teachers (51 full-time equivalent) and 34 non-teaching staff (22 full-time equivalent). It includes a special education program.

St James Lutheran College is a private primary and secondary (Prep–12) school for boys and girls at 138-172 Pantlins Lane (25.2980°S 152.8137°E). In 2017, the school had an enrolment of 609 students with 43 teachers (41 full-time equivalent) and 34 non-teaching staff (26 full-time equivalent).

Bayside Christian College Hervey Bay is a private primary and secondary (Prep–12) school at 171 Pantlins Lane (25.2986°S 152.8153°E).

The nearest government secondary school is Hervey Bay State High School in neighbouring Pialba to the north.

== Amenities ==
Stocklands Hervey Bay shopping centre is on Central Avenue in the north-east of the suburb.

St James Lutheran Church is at 138-172 Pantlins Lane (25.2987°S 152.8148°E).

New Life Christian Church is at 225 Main Street (25.3011°S 152.8356°E).

Fraser Coast Baptist Church is at 175 Urraween Road (accessed via Pantlins Lane, 25.2991°S 152.8158°E).

St Stephen's Hospital is a private hospital at 1 Medical Place (25.2998°S 152.8238°E). It is operated by UnitingCare Australia.

The Fraser Coast Hospice is at 222 Urraween Road.
