= Pialba =

- Town
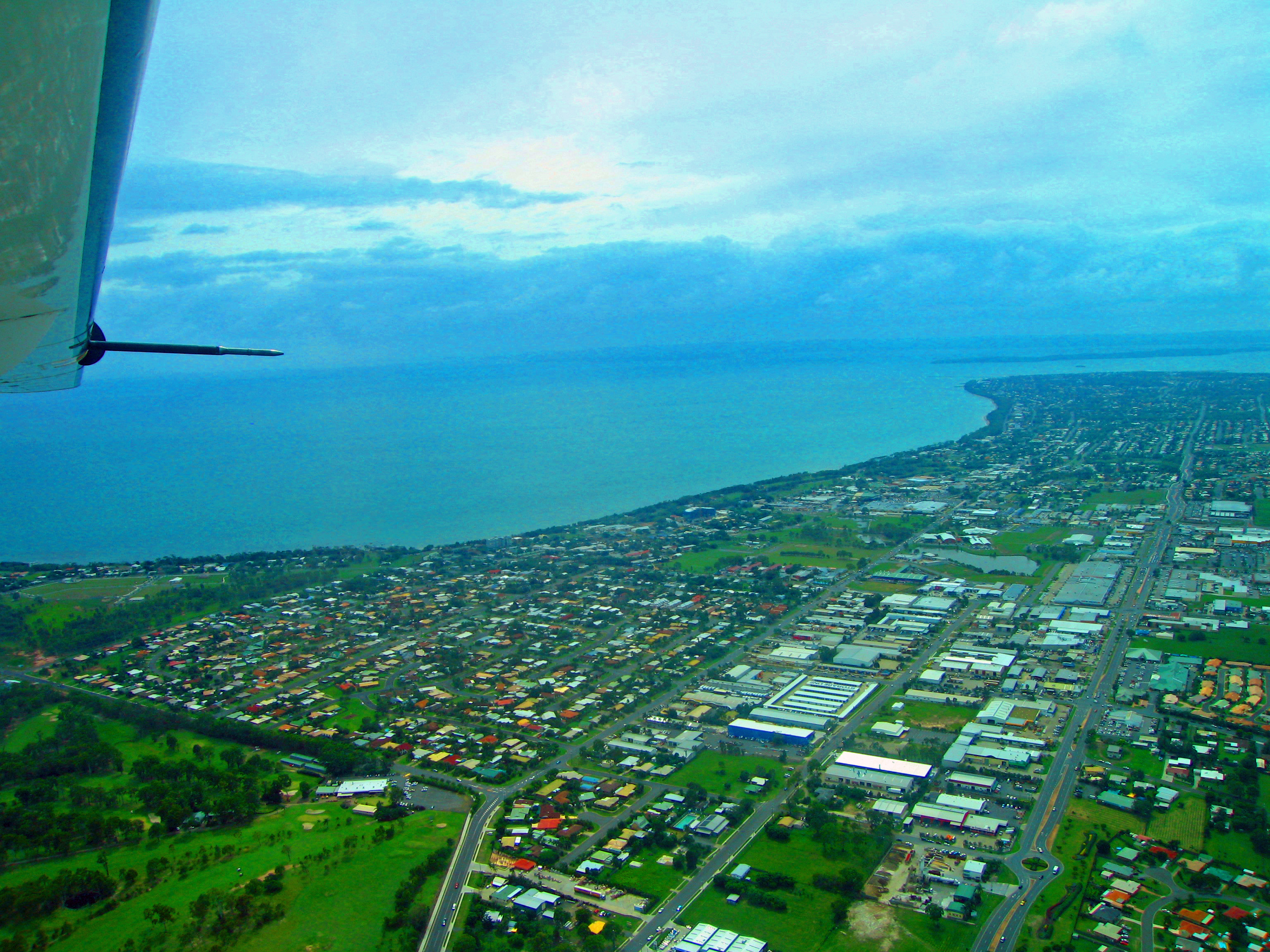
- Aerial view over Pialba

- Interactive map of Pialba
- Coordinates: 25.2805°S 152.8386°E
- Country: Australia
- State: Queensland
- City: Hervey Bay
- LGA: Fraser Coast Region
- Location: 33.9 km (21.1 mi) NE of Maryborough; 123 km (76 mi) NNE of Gympie; 289 km (180 mi) N of Brisbane; 8 km (5.0 mi) W of Hervey Bay

Government
  - State electorate: Hervey Bay
  - Federal division: Hinkler

Area
  - Total: 5.8 km^{2} (2.2 sq mi)
- Elevation: 10 m (33 ft)

Population
  - Total: 4,151 (2021 census)
  - Density: 716/km^{2} (1,854/sq mi)
- Time zone: UTC+10:00 (AEST)
- Postcode: 4655
Localities around Pialba
Point Vernon	Hervey Bay	Hervey Bay
Eli Waters	Pialba	Scarness
Urraween	Urraween	Kawungan

Pialba is a coastal town and suburb of Hervey Bay in the Fraser Coast Region, Queensland, Australia. It is the central business district of Hervey Bay. In the 2021 census, the suburb of Pialba had a population of 4,151 people.

== Geography ==
Pialba is a located 294 kilometres (183 mi) north of Brisbane on the southern shore of Hervey Bay. It is the central business district of the town of Hervey Bay.

== History ==
The area was originally known as Point Vernon, until a town was surveyed and named Polson. On 19 March 1931 the town name was changed to Pialba, reflecting the long existing use of that name.

The Pialba Shire Council existed from 1905 to 1917.

The Hervey Bay railway line from Maryborough to Pialba opened on 18 December 1896. It was used to transport harvested sugarcane to the Maryborough Sugar Mill in addition to daily passenger trains. An extension to Urangan and the Urangan Pier opened on 19 December 1913. As the Pialba railway station was built so close to the beach (25.2840°S 152.8384°E), it was not possible to extend the line directly from the Pialba station. A junction was added before the Pialba station and the trains had to reverse out of the station in order to take the junction to Urangan. From 10 June 1929 a railmotor was used to operate the passenger services.

Pialba State School opened on 30 July 1884.

An undenominational church was opened in Pialba on New Year's Day (1 January) 1884 by the Presbyterian minister in Maryborough, Joseph Irvine Knipe. It was erected by German settlers.

Radio broadcasting commenced in the Wide Bay area on Wednesday 14 January 1948 from a transmitter in Piabla under the call sign 4QB which is now ABC Wide Bay.

Hervey Bay State High School opened on 28 January 1964.

Hervey Bay Church of Christ was established in the mid-1970s. However some of the congregation felt that the Church of Christ was adopting an overly liberal interpretation of the Bible and renamed themselves Hervey Bay Bible Church to better reflect their beliefs. Disagreements with the Church of Christ resulted in the congregation leaving the church premises and conducting their services in other premises, initially the QCWA Hall and then later at the Hervey Bay Community Centre.

In June 1985 a group of volunteers established the Women's Information Service which expanded over time to meet a wider range of community needs. It established a community centre in a house at 47 Taylor Street in 1987 and became an incorporated association in 1989. As the number of community programs expanded, larger premises were needed. On 5 December 2011 a new purpose-built Hervey Bay Community Centre was opened at 22 Charles Street.

The Hervey Bay Library opened in 1997 and had a major refurbishment in 2014.

The council's new administration building and library is currently under construction in the Pialba CBD. It is being funded and built through the Hinkler Regional Deal between the Federal Government and the Fraser Coast Regional Council.

== Demographics ==
In the 2016 census, the suburb of Pialba had a population of 3,678 people.

In the 2021 census, the suburb of Pialba had a population of 4,151 people.

== Heritage listings ==
Pialba has a number of heritage-listed sites, including:

- Pialba Memorial Cenotaph, Freedom Park, Main Street

== Education ==
Pialba State School is a government primary (Prep–6) school for boys and girls at Alice Street (25.2793°S 152.8333°E). In 2017, the school had an enrolment of 456 students with 42 teachers (38 full-time equivalent) and 37 non-teaching staff (26 full-time equivalent). It includes a special education and the Hervey Bay Positive Learning Centre.

Hervey Bay State High School is a government secondary (7–12) school for boys and girls at Beach Road (25.2819°S 152.8322°E). In 2017, the school had an enrolment of 1019 students with 88 teachers (83 full-time equivalent) and 43 non-teaching staff (34 full-time equivalent). It includes a special education program.

== Amenities ==
The Fraser Coast Regional Council operate the Hervey Bay library at 161 Old Maryborough Road, Pialba (25.2850°S 152.8370°E).

A number of Hervey Bay's major facilities are on the Esplanade at Pialba. Seafront Oval is a venue used for major events, such as concerts.

Hervey Bay's free waterpark, Wetside, is next to the Seafront Oval in Pialba as is the skate park.

There are a number of recreational amenities in Pialba including a PCYC, pickleball courts, and pump track. The Pump Track was officially opened by Fraser Coast Mayor George Seymour and State MP for Hervey Bay Adrian Tantari on 9 August 2024.

The Hervey Bay Historical Village and Museum is located on Zephyr Street, Pialba, adjacent to the Z-Pac Community Theatre.

The Halcro Street Community Garden is in Pialba.

The Point Vernon/Pialba branch of the Queensland Country Women's Association meets at the QCWA Rooms at 7 Torquay Road, Pialba (25.2818°S 152.8402°E).

The Hervey Bay Community Centre is at 22 Charles Street (25.2818°S 152.8372°E).

All Saints Anglican Chapel is at 5 Peters Lane (25.2808°S 152.8406°E).

Hervey Bay Gospel Church is at 44 Hunter Street (25.2864°S 152.8410°E).

Bayside Christian Church is at 18 Neils Street (25.2861°S 152.8455°E).

Hervey Bay Church of Christ is at 27 Neils Street (25.2872°S 152.8448°E).

St Joseph's Catholic Church is at 22 Torquay Road (but accessed from Bryant Street, 25.2816°S 152.8422°E).

Hervey Bay Bible Church meets at the Hervey Bay Community Centre each Sunday.

LifeChurch Hervey Bay meets at the Community Centre at 22 Charles Street. It is part of the Wesleyan Methodist Church of Australia.
