= Scarness, Queensland =

Scarness
- Suburb
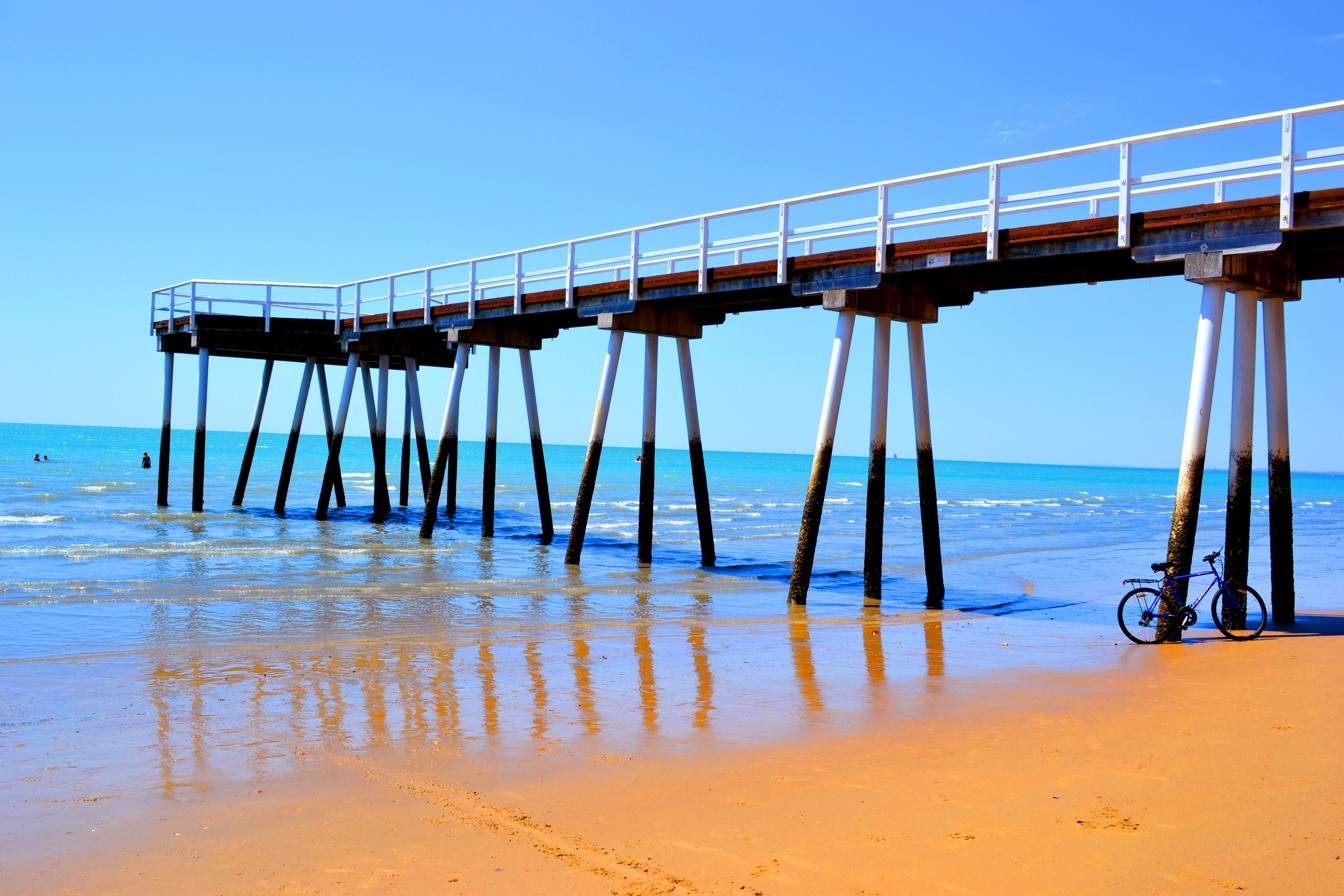
- Scarness Jetty, 2017

- Interactive map of Scarness
- Coordinates: 25.29°S 152.8538°E
- Country: Australia
- State: Queensland
- City: Hervey Bay
- LGA: Fraser Coast Region
- Location: 2.9 km (1.8 mi) E of Pialba; 4.5 km (2.8 mi) W of Urangan; 36.7 km (22.8 mi) NE of Maryborough; 290 km (180 mi) N of Brisbane

Government
  - State electorate: Hervey Bay
  - Federal division: Hinkler

Area
  - Total: 2.2 km^{2} (0.85 sq mi)

Population
  - Total: 3,646 (2021 census)
  - Density: 1,660/km^{2} (4,290/sq mi)
- Time zone: UTC+10:00 (AEST)
- Postcode: 4655
Suburbs around Scarness
Hervey Bay	Hervey Bay	Hervey Bay
Pialba	Scarness	Torquay
Kawungan	Kawungan	Torquay

Scarness is a coastal suburb of Hervey Bay in the Fraser Coast Region, Queensland, Australia. In the 2021 census, Scarness had a population of 3,646 people.

== History ==
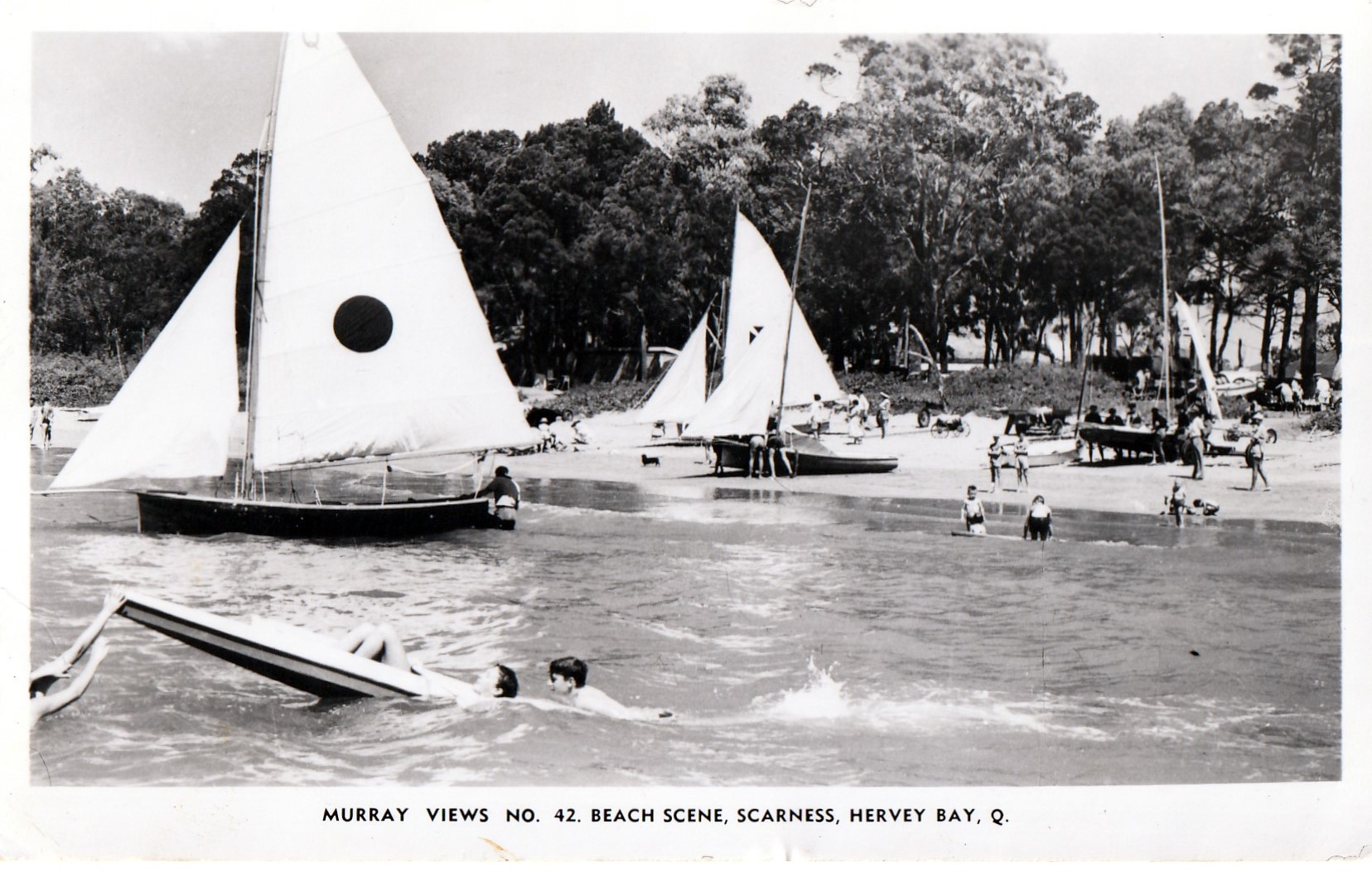
Beach at Scarness, 1950s

The Hervey Bay railway line opened from Maryborough to Pialba in 1896 and extended to Urangan via Scarness in 1913 with Scarness served by the Scarness railway station (25.2871°S 152.8525°E). The railway line was officially closed in 1993, but very few trains were operating on the line in previous years as demand for passenger and freight services declined. Part of the line from Pialba via Scarness to Urangan has been redeveloped as a rail trail, but the vision is to develop a Mary-to-Bay rail trail that will go from Maryborough to Urangan.

The Scarness Band Rotunda was built in 1926. It was added to the Fraser Coast Local Heritage Register in September 2025.

From the 1930s to 1990, there was a roller skating rink on the Scarness foreshore.

For over six decades the foreshore at Scarness has been used over the Christmas period for a nightly event, the Scarness Ambulance Wheel.

The suburb was officially named by the Queensland Place Names Board on 12 April 1980. It was officially bounded on 25 June 1999.

== Demographics ==
In the 2016 census, Scarness had a population of 3,519 people.

In the 2021 census, Scarness had a population of 3,646 people.

== Education ==
There are no schools in Scarness. The nearest government primary schools are Torquay State School in neighbouring Torquay to the east, Kawungan State School in neighbouring Kawungan to the south, and Pialba State School in neighbouring Pialba to the west. The nearest government secondary schools are Urangan State High School in Urangan to the east and Hervey Bay State High School in neighbouring Pialba to the west.

== Amenities ==
Z-PAC Theatre is a community-based theatre at 15 Zephyr Street (25.2825°S 152.8487°E).

Hervey Bay Presbyterian Church is at 5 Denman Camp Road (25.2851°S 152.8610°E).

Hervey Bay Seventh Day Adventist Church is at 37 Hervey Street (25.2864°S 152.8494°E).

There are a number of parks in the area:

- Arthur Proctor Memorial Park (25.2872°S 152.8602°E)
- Barron Park (25.2880°S 152.8543°E)
- Denmans Camp Road Park (25.2887°S 152.8596°E)
- Faye Avenue Park (25.2938°S 152.8497°E)
- Keats Street Park (25.2927°S 152.8478°E)
- Oleander Park (25.2952°S 152.8562°E)
- Polhmann Court Park (25.2914°S 152.8513°E)
- Sweetwater Park (25.2920°S 152.8465°E)

== Facilities ==
Hervey Bay Ambulance Station is at 118 Torquay Road (25.2859°S 152.8514°E).

Scarness Police Station is at 140-146 Torquay Road (25.2862°S 152.8539°E).

Hervey Bay Courthouse is at 26 Queens Road (25.2857°S 152.8541°E).

The Hervey Bay Bowls Club is located on Denmans Camp Rd, Scarness.

== Attractions ==
The Hervey Bay Historical Village and Museum is located on Zephyr Street Scarness.

The Scarness Caravan Park is on the Esplanade foreshore.

Scarness Jetty is popular for fishing (25.28279°S 152.85376°E).

The Maryborough Sailing Club has been based on the Esplanade at Scarness since 1929.
