= Urangan Point State School, Block D =

Urangan Point State School, D block
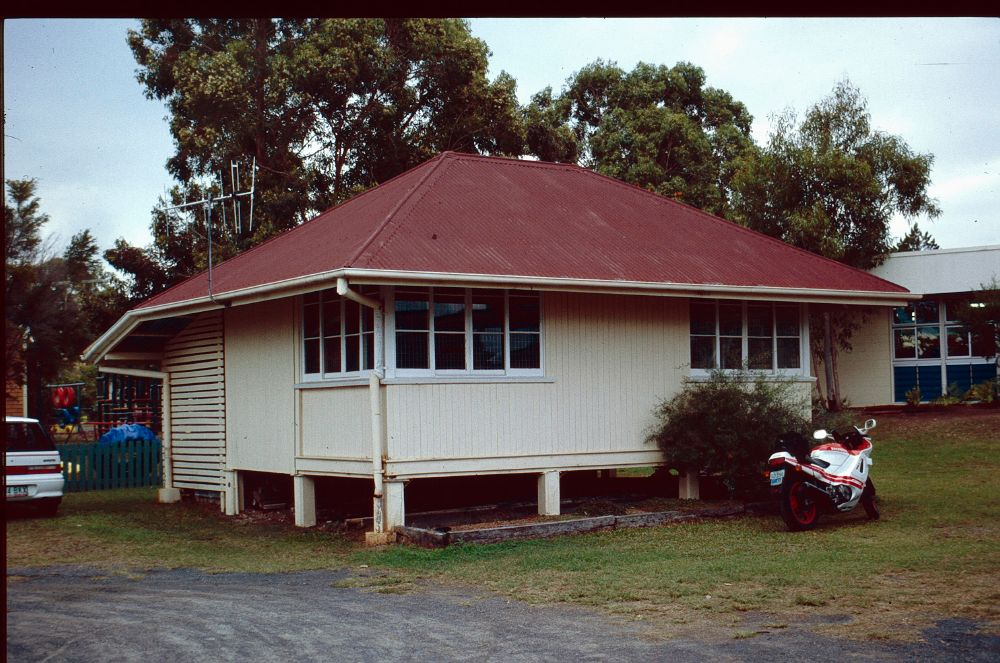
- Block D, 1994

- Location within Queensland Location within Australia
- 25.2909°S 152.902°E
- Location: Miller Street, Urangan, Fraser Coast Region, Queensland, Australia

History
- Design period: 1914–1919 (World War I)
- Built: 1916–1928

Site notes
- Architect: Department of Public Works (Queensland)
- Architectural style: Classicism

Queensland Heritage Register
- Official name: Urangan Point State School, Block D
- Type: state heritage (built)
- Designated: 3 October 1994
- Reference no.: 601375
- Significant period: 1910s (historical); 1916–1928 (fabric)
- Significant components: school/school room

Block D at the Urangan Point State School is a heritage-listed school building at Miller Street, Urangan, Fraser Coast Region, Queensland, Australia. It was designed by Department of Public Works (Queensland) and built from 1916 to 1928. It was added to the Queensland Heritage Register on 3 October 1994.

== History ==
This single-storeyed timber building was constructed in 1916 as the first Urangan Point State School. It was a Type 1 (open-air) school design, built to plans prepared by the Queensland Department of Public Works. Of the 138 open-air schools recently identified as being constructed in Queensland between 1914 and 1922, the first Urangan Point school building survives as one of less than 25% such buildings still in use in Queensland schools. It is also one of the more intact of these structures.

European settlement of the Urangan area dates at least to the 1860s, when timbergetters moved through the area. In the late 1860s and early 1870s the area was thrown open for selection, with Maryborough solicitor Edward Corser taking up the bulk of the Urangan township blocks, first surveyed in September 1867. A small fishing industry was established at Urangan Point in the late 19th century, but the main impetus for the town's development was the construction of the rail link to Maryborough (opened 19 December 1913), and the deep water jetty at Urangan Point (erected 1913–1917). In November 1915, the township consisted of a station master's residence, boarding house, hotel, and several small stores. The railway had been completed, opening up Urangan (or Port Maryborough as it was more officially known) as a seaside resort, and the jetty was under construction. Fishing was still the principal commercial activity, and a number of South Sea Islanders who had opted not to return to their home islands under the legislation of 1901, which provided for the repatriation of all South Sea Islanders by the end of 1906, moved to the district and were associated mostly with the fishing industry.

Urangan Point residents petitioned the Department of Public Instruction in August 1915, for the establishment of state school in their community. They had the support of the Port Maryborough (Urangan) Progress Association, and Maryborough businessman and politician Edward Corser, who was the Member of the Queensland Legislative Assembly for Maryborough from October 1909 to May 1915, and the Member of the Australian House of Representatives for Wide Bay from December 1915 until his death in July 1928. Corser offered to sell to the Department of Public Instruction a central Urangan site of about 2.5 acres, first taken up by his father in 1871, and transferred to himself in 1908. Following a community meeting held on 4 October 1915 and the establishment of a school building committee, a formal application for the establishment of a state school at Urangan Point was made. The prospective enrolment was around 24.

The Urangan community already had access to two schools in the district: in Pialba, approximately 4 miles (6.4 km) distant, and Torquay, just over 2 miles (3.2 km). Most Urangan children attended the overcrowded Torquay School, which was accommodating over twice the number of pupils for which it had been designed, and was in urgent need of additional accommodation. In his report of November 1915, the district schools inspector recommended that a school be established at Urangan, largely to relieve the pressure on Torquay, and that the site offered by Edward Corser would be suitable. Title was transferred to the Secretary for Public Instruction in July 1916.

As the Urangan Point settlement was a small one, and considered by the District Inspector of Schools unlikely to grow to any extent, an inexpensive Type I (Open-air) school building was recommended. The building comprised a single room, 21 by 14 feet (6.4 by 4.3 m), with desk accommodation for 30 students. It had canvas blinds to the window openings and two large canvas doors, one at the side and one in the front. There were no verandahs.

Open-air schooling had been experimented with around the turn of the century in England and Germany, and in the 1910s was promoted in Queensland by Eleanor Bourne, Director of the Department of Public Instruction's School Medical Service from 1912. A recent study has identified 138 open-air schools constructed in Queensland between 1914 and 1922, with the bulk erected in 1915–16. Approximately 25% of these structures were constructed as annexes to established schools, but most were erected in sparsely settled districts as the only school building. They were comparatively inexpensive to construct, and were considered appropriate in areas unlikely to grow in population, or to transient mining or railway communities. Within a few years, the climatic disadvantages of these open-air schools, particularly those like the Urangan Point School, which had no verandahs, became apparent. When the canvas blinds were drawn against rain or wind, the schoolroom became dark and stuffy, and teaching was almost impossible. The canvas blinds were damaged easily, and required constant attention. They offered no resistance to intruders, and straying or native animals could not be kept out. In the early 1920s, all of the open-air buildings were enclosed with sliding sashes, timber walling and timber doors.

Tenders for the Urangan Point school were called in April 1916, with the contract being let in May to Maryborough contractor Christy Hansen, with a price of £183/5-, and a contract time of 3 months. The building was completed some months before opening to students on 9 October 1916. In the following year, local contractor James Ridgers was employed to fence the school grounds.

By mid-1918, the canvas blinds, which had no springs but used a weight, controlled by a rope, as counterpoise, were already causing problems. In 1924 these were replaced with the present sliding sash windows; the large canvas door at the front was replaced by vertically jointed timber to match the original walling; and the present entrance, at the side of the building, was filled in and a wooden door installed.

In June 1928, the school committee requested a shelter shed or verandah be erected, as on wet days children had to stand in the rain until the arrival of the teacher. An awning or lean to was subsequently supplied, the work completed on 13 October 1928, at a cost of £20.

By mid-1931 the school building, which had been designed to accommodate 30 pupils, was seriously overcrowded, with an average attendance of over 40, and close to 50 pupils enrolled. Additional accommodation was considered urgent, and a new building, 21 by 18 feet (6.4 by 5.5 m) with 8-foot (2.4 m) verandahs front and back, to accommodate 40 pupils, was commissioned. The contract was let in late 1931 to Messrs McKewen and Eckstein with a price of £312, and the new building was ready for occupation by mid-February 1932. Students in grades 1–3 remained in the early building, and the older students moved into the new building. This second school building was demolished in 1977.

By the early 1960s, Urangan Point State School comprised three classroom blocks, and the first school building had become the school library. In 1977 it was relocated to another site within the school grounds. The building has been re-roofed, and the ridge original ventilator has been removed. It now functions as a music room.

== Description ==
Block D of the Urangan Point State School is a single-room, single- storeyed timber building with concrete piers and a hipped corrugated iron roof. The building is set back from the school's Miller Street frontage with a car parking area to the south, pre-school building and fenced playground to the west, and recent teaching blocks to the north and southeast.

The building has boarded ceilings, single-skin vertically boarded walls, with balustrade height walls at the northeast and southeast corners with sliding timber framed windows above. The timber entrance door is located on the northern side and is accessed via timber steps. A lean-to storage room on the western side is enclosed with horizontal timber battens and has a concrete floor.

Internally, the building has boarded ceilings raked to collar-beam height. Early timber shelving is located in the southwest corner, with the blackboard positioned centrally on the western wall.

== Heritage listing ==
Block D of the Urangan Point State School was listed on the Queensland Heritage Register on 3 October 1994 having satisfied the following criteria.

The place is important in demonstrating the evolution or pattern of Queensland's history.

The building is significant as a substantially intact, small rural school building of the early 20th century. Evidence of its early open-air form remains in the extant sliding sash windows which replaced the original canvas blinds in 1924.

The place is important in demonstrating the principal characteristics of a particular class of cultural places.

The building remains one of the most intact of the former open-air schools surviving in Queensland.
