= Susan River =

Susan River can refer to:

== Australia ==
- Susan River, Queensland, a locality in the Fraser Coast Region
- Susan River (Queensland), a river in Queensland, Australia

== Canada ==
- Susan River (Labrador), a river in Labrador, Canada

== United States ==
- Susan River (California), a river in California, United States
