= Booral =

Booral could refer to:

- Booral, New South Wales, a locality in the Mid-Coast Council, Australia
- Booral, Queensland, a locality in the Fraser Coast Region, Australia
