= River Heads, Queensland =

River Heads
- Town
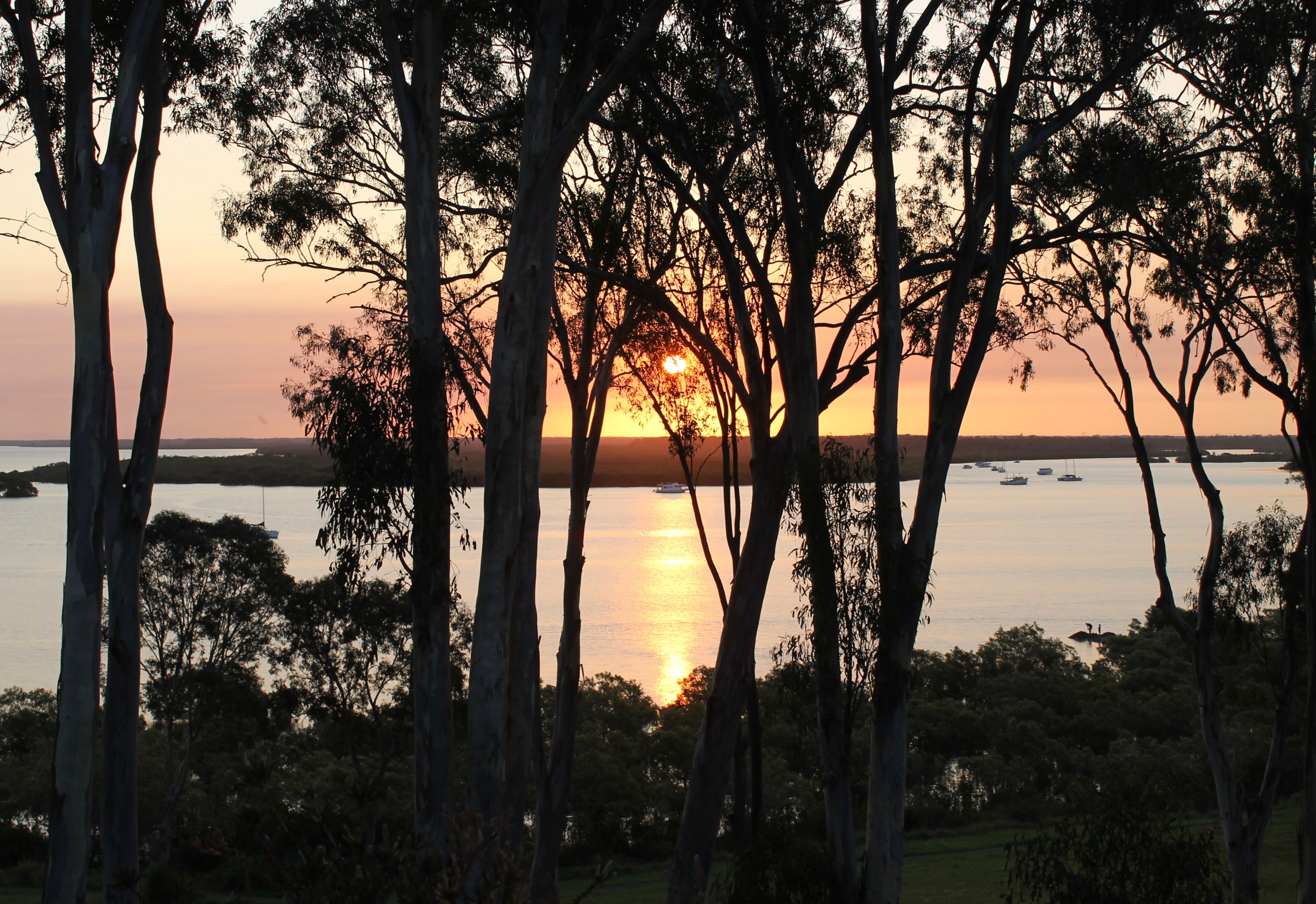
- Sunset at River Heads, 2015

- Interactive map of River Heads
- Coordinates: 25.4133°S 152.9136°E
- Country: Australia
- State: Queensland
- LGA: Fraser Coast Region
- Location: 13.4 km (8.3 mi) S of Urangan; 26.5 km (16.5 mi) SE of Hervey Bay; 42.7 km (26.5 mi) NE of Maryborough; 301 km (187 mi) N of Brisbane

Government
  - State electorate: Hervey Bay
  - Federal division: Hinkler

Area
  - Total: 20.7 km^{2} (8.0 sq mi)

Population
  - Total: 2,044 (2021 census)
  - Density: 98.74/km^{2} (255.7/sq mi)
- Time zone: UTC+10:00 (AEST)
- Postcode: 4655
Localities around River Heads
Bunya Creek	Booral	Great Sandy Strait
Susan River	River Heads	Great Sandy Strait
Susan River	Susan River	Great Sandy Strait

River Heads is a coastal town and locality in the Fraser Coast Region, Queensland, Australia. It is at the mouth of the Mary River. In the 2021 census, the locality of River Heads had a population of 2,044 people.

== Geography ==
River Heads is 18 kilometres (11 mi) south of the city of Hervey Bay. The town is built on a narrow peninsula surrounded by the Great Sandy Strait (to the east), the mouth of the Mary River (to the south) and the mouth of the Susan River (a tributary of the Mary River) to the south-west.

River Heads Road enters the locality from the north (Booral) and extends south to the tip of the peninsula (being renamed Ariadne Street on the tip of the peninsula); it divides the locality with the urban area to the east and farmland to the west (mostly used as grazing on native vegetation).

== History ==
River Heads was originally called Bingham after Richard Bingham Sheridan, but was renamed on 22 November 1986. Bingham, in turn, was previously called Tyroom, an aboriginal word.

The first 40 town lots in Bingham were offered for sale in August 1864.

Bingham State School opened on 10 May 1915 (possibly then known as Mary River Heads Provisional School). It closed on 5 September 1926. It was on a 5-acre (2.0 ha) site.

== Demographics ==
In the 2011 census, the locality of River Heads had a population of 1,294 people.

In the 2016 census, the locality of River Heads had a population of 1,539 people.

In the 2021 census, the locality of River Heads had a population of 2,044 people.

== Education ==
There are no schools in River Heads. The nearest government primary school is Sandy Strait State School in Urangan to the north. The nearest government secondary school is Urangan State High School, also in Urangan.

== Transport ==
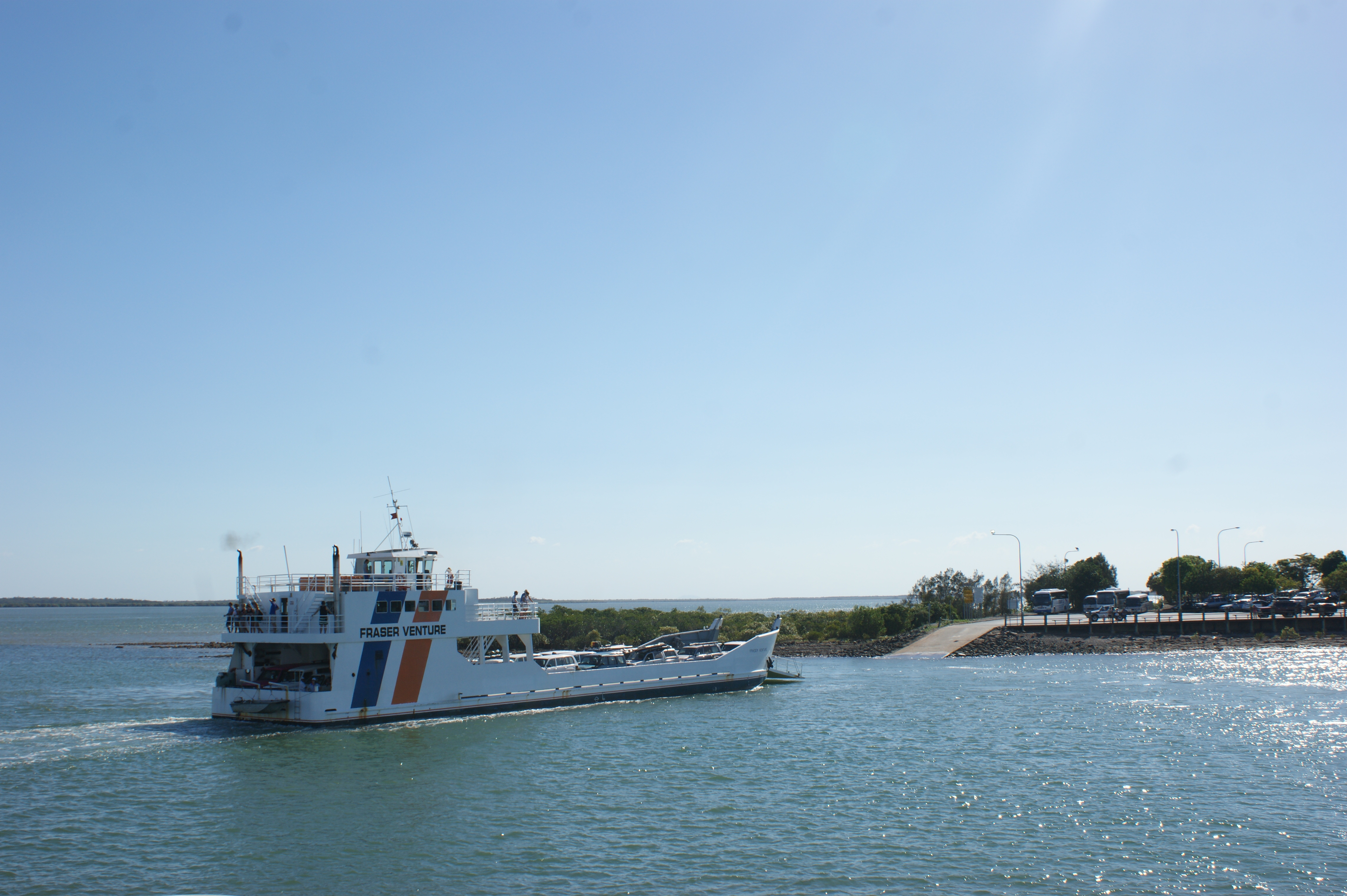
Fraser Island ferry arriving at River Heads, 2013

Vehicular ferries linking the mainland with Wanggoolba Creek and Kingfisher Bay Resort on Fraser Island depart from River Heads. The journey to Fraser Island takes 45 minutes.

There are a number of boating facilities managed by the Fraser Coast Regional Council, including:

- the barge ramp at Aridane Street used by the ferries (25.4300°S 152.9241°E)
- the eastern boat ramp into the Great Sandy Strait (25.4295°S 152.9238°E)
- the western boat ramp and floating walkway into the Mary River (25.4302°S 152.9234°E)
