= Torquay (disambiguation) =

Torquay is a town in Devon, England.

Torquay may also refer to:

== Settlements ==
=== Australia ===
- Torquay, Queensland, a coastal locality in the Fraser Coast Region
- Torquay, Tasmania, the former name of Devonport, Tasmania
- Torquay, Victoria

=== Other places ===
- Torquay, Saskatchewan, Canada

== Other uses ==
- HMS Torquay (F43), a Royal Navy frigate
- Torquay (UK Parliament constituency), a county constituency in Devon, England
- Torquay railway station, a station serving the town of Torquay, Devon, England
- Torquay United F.C., a football team associated with Torquay, Devon, England
- "Torquay", 1959 song and 1961 album by The Fireballs
