= Bunya Creek, Queensland =

Bunya Creek
- Suburb
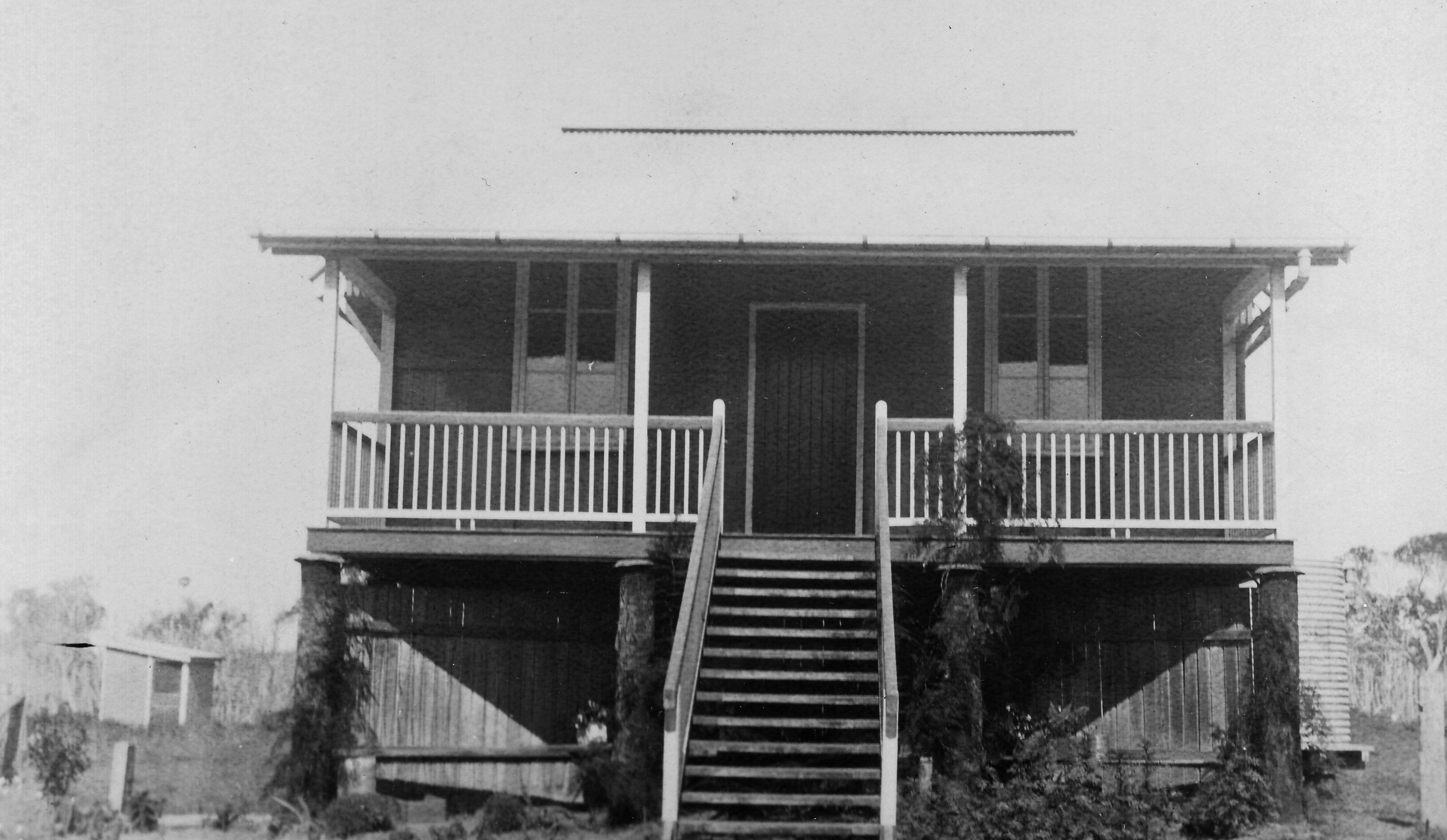
- Urangan Road State School, 1936

- Interactive map of Bunya Creek
- Coordinates: 25.3719°S 152.8358°E
- Country: Australia
- State: Queensland
- LGA: Fraser Coast Region
- Location: 11.4 km (7.1 mi) S of Pialbla (Hervey Bay); 17.3 km (10.7 mi) SW of Urangan; 30.9 km (19.2 mi) NE of Maryborough; 293 km (182 mi) N of Brisbane

Government
  - State electorates: Maryborough; Hervey Bay
  - Federal division: Hinkler

Area
  - Total: 46.1 km^{2} (17.8 sq mi)

Population
  - Total: 75 (2021 census)
  - Density: 1.627/km^{2} (4.21/sq mi)
- Time zone: UTC+10:00 (AEST)
- Postcode: 4655
Suburbs around Bunya Creek
Nikenbah	Nikenbah	Booral
Sunshine Acres	Bunya Creek	River Heads
Susan River	Susan River	Susan River

Bunya Creek is a rural locality in the Fraser Coast Region, Queensland, Australia. In the 2021 census, Bunya Creek had a population of 75 people.

== History ==
Urangan Road State School opened on 22 February 1915 on the Urangan Road. In 1956, the school was renamed Bingham Road State School. It closed in 1960. The school was at 847 Booral Road (previously known as Urangan Road and Nikenbah Bingham Road) in Bunya Creek (25.3453°S 152.8505°E).

On Sunday 4 February 1917, Christ Church was officially opened by the Anglican Archdeacon of Toowoomba on Urangan Road, adjacent to the Urangan Road School. In 1965, it was renamed All Saints Anglican Church. It closed in 1986. It was located at 835 Booral Road (approx 25.3448°S 152.8514°E).

== Demographics ==
In the 2016 census, Bunya Creek had a population of 79 people.

In the 2021 census, Bunya Creek had a population of 75 people.

== Education ==
There are no schools in Bunya Creek. The nearest government primary schools are Yarrilee State School in Urraween to the north-west, Kawungan State School in Kawungan to the north, and Sandy Strait State School in Urangan to the north-east. The nearest government secondary schools are Hervey Bay State High School in Pialba to the north-west and Urangan State High School in Urangan to the north-east.
