= Booral, Queensland =

Booral Hervey Bay, Queensland
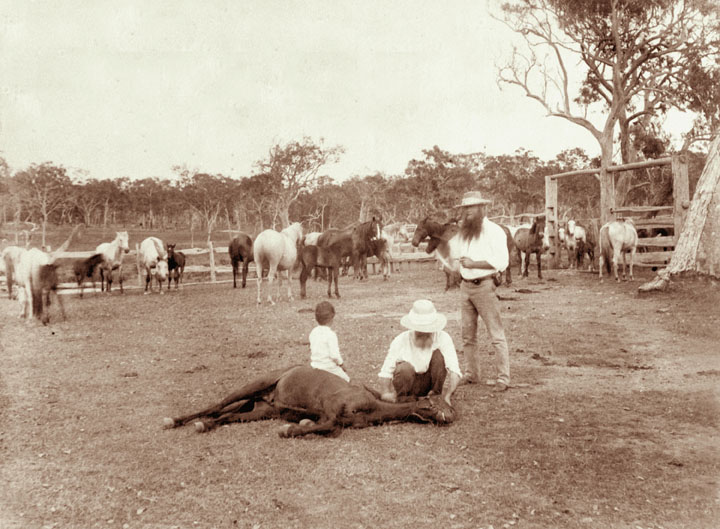
- Booral horse station, circa 1898

- Coordinates: 25.3538°S 152.89°E
- Population: 1,636 (2021 census)
  - Density: 59.93/km^{2} (155.2/sq mi)
- Postcode(s): 4655
- Area: 27.3 km^{2} (10.5 sq mi)
- Time zone: AEST (UTC+10:00)
- Location: 9.9 km (6 mi) S of Urangan; 22.0 km (14 mi) SE of Hervey Bay; 39.2 km (24 mi) NW of Maryborough; 303 km (188 mi) N of Brisbane
- LGA(s): Fraser Coast Region
- State electorate(s): Hervey Bay
- Federal division(s): Hinkler
Suburbs around Booral:
| Wondunna | Urangan | Great Sandy Strait |
| Nikenbah | Booral | Great Sandy Strait |
| Bunya Creek | River Heads | Great Sandy Strait |

Booral is a coastal locality in the Fraser Coast Region, Queensland, Australia. In the 2021 census, Booral had a population of 1,636 people.

== Geography ==
The waters of Hervey Bay form the eastern boundary.

== History ==
The name Booral is a Kabi language word meaning either tall (relating to the sky god Beiral) or burrall meaning place of shell mounds. Many shell mounds have been found along the coastline, arising from Aboriginal people feasting on shellfish. Aboriginal people travelled from the Bunya Mountains to trade bunya nuts for shellfish. It is believed Aboriginal people inhabited the area for over 6,000 years.

Edgar Thomas Aldridge established the Booral Homestead in the 1850s.

== Demographics ==
In the 2011 census, Booral had a population of 1,449 people.

In the 2016 census, Booral had a population of 1,540 people.

In the 2021 census, Booral had a population of 1,636 people.

== Economy ==
The proximity to the Great Sandy Strait enables salt water aquaculture, including the farming of fish, sea cucumbers and soft shell crabs.

== Education ==
There are no schools in Booral. The nearest government schools are Sandy Strait State School in neighbouring Urangan to the north and Kawungan State School in Kawungan to the north-west. The nearest government secondary school is Urangan State High School, also in Urangan.

== Community associations ==
The Booral Community Association Inc is a group of volunteers who seek to promote the interests of the community at all levels of government. A major issue for the group has been the restriction of foreshore access to only certain property holders rather than to the general public.
