= Wanggoolba Creek =

River in Australia

Coordinates: 25.4458°S 152.9931°E

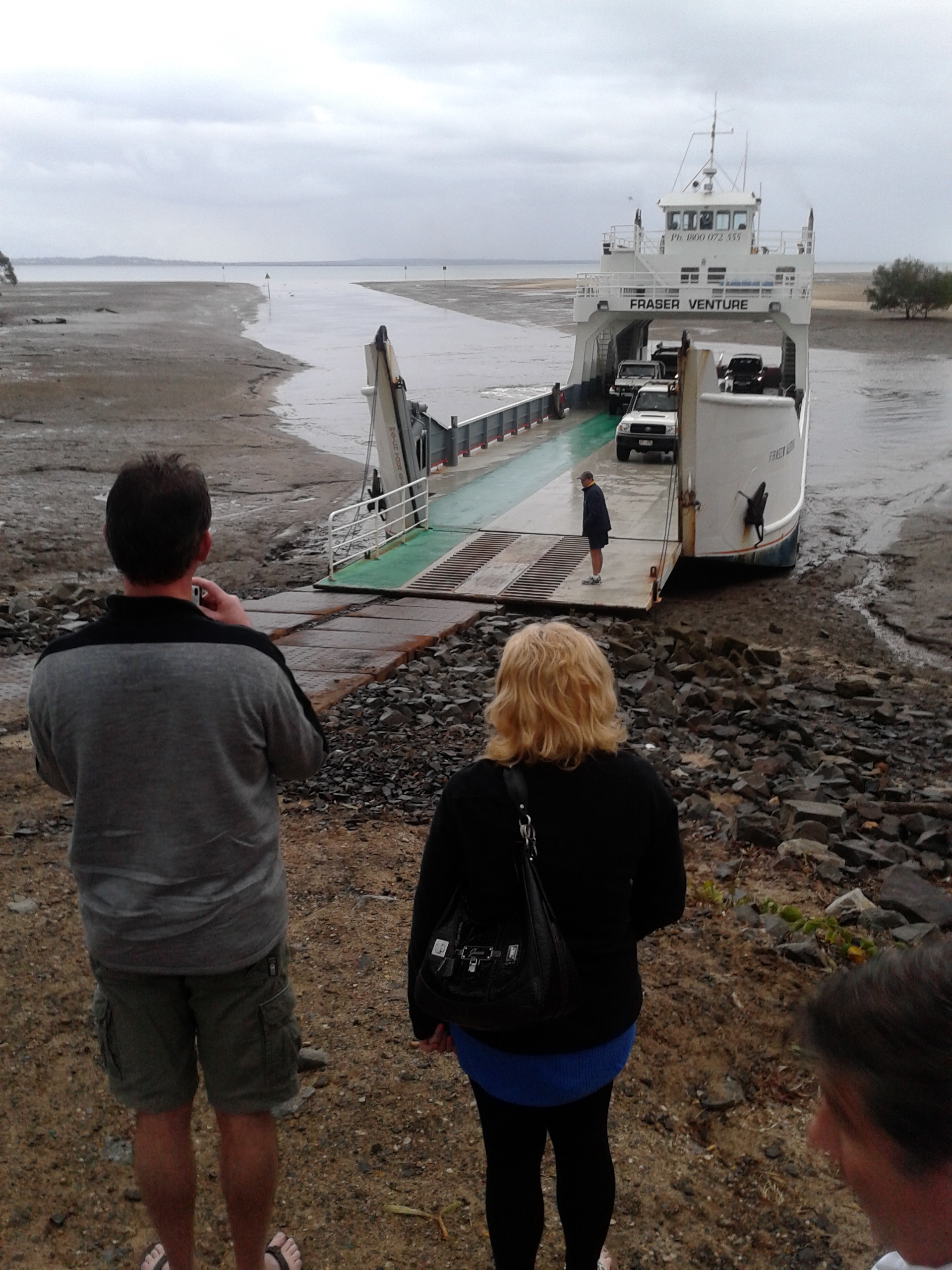
Ferry in the mouth at low tide

Wanggoolba Creek is a fresh water creek on Fraser Island with its source in the Pile Valley and mouth on the Western shores of the island. Wanggoolba Creek at Central Station is a popular tourist destination due to the crystal clear waters flowing over white sand through a rainforest valley. Ferry services from River Heads land at the mouth of Wanggoolba Creek three times daily.

== See also ==
- List of rivers of Australia
