= Colonsay Farm =

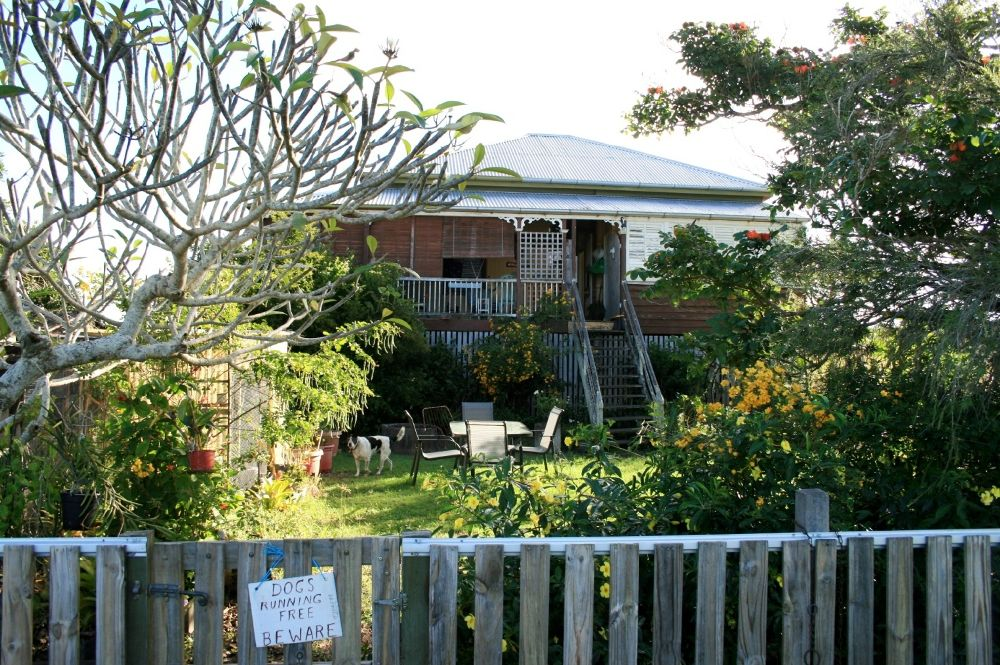
- Colonsay Farm (former Doolong Farm), 2006

- Location within Queensland Location within Australia
- 25.3132°S 152.8477°E
- Location: 125 Doolong Road, Kawungan, Fraser Coast Region, Queensland, Australia

History
- Design period: 1900–1914 (early 20th century)
- Built: 1909

Queensland Heritage Register
- Official name: Colonsay Farm (former Doolong Farm)
- Type: state heritage (built)
- Designated: 11 March 2011
- Reference no.: 602771
- Significant components: cow bails

Colonsay Farm is a heritage-listed farm at 125 Doolong Road, Kawungan, Fraser Coast Region, Queensland, Australia. It was built in 1909. It is also known as Doolong Farm. It was added to the Queensland Heritage Register on 11 March 2011.

== History ==
Colonsay (formerly known as Doolong Farm) at Kawungan in Hervey Bay stands on 62.9 hectares (155 acres) of a former 80.9 hectares (200 acres) farm selected by a Danish immigrant in 1879. The existing structures were built during the first half of the 20th century, the high point of dairying in Queensland, and they illustrate past dairy farming practices in the Wide Bay region. The farm complex includes a c. 1909 residence, a slab barn with early hand milking dairy, a separator shed/cream house, two piggeries and a 1940s walk-through electrified dairy with yards.

European settlement at Hervey Bay began with the establishment of the pastoral run Dalgaroom (16,000 acres (6,500 ha)) in the mid-1850s, and timbergetting commenced in the district in the mid-1860s. Under the Crown Lands Alienation Act (1868) the entire Wide Bay region was declared a settled area and large land holdings were no longer permitted. Dalgaroom run was reduced to 14,000 acres (5,700 ha) and renamed Toogoom, while the balance of the land was set aside for a railway reserve. From 1870 the Toogoom run was resumed and cut into blocks for sale. Many selectors around Hervey Bay were Danish immigrants, arriving from 1871 as part of an assisted migration scheme. Farms in the Pialba area grew fruit, maize and potatoes, but they did not prosper beyond a subsistence level until the railway from Colton to Pialba opened in December 1896.

Another crop grown by local selectors was sugar. Four small sugar mills operated at Pialba in the 1880s, including a mill opened in 1883 by Hansen and Jorgensen, just southeast of Colonsay farm. Although all the Pialba mills had closed by 1889, following the opening of the railway to Pialba the district became a major supplier of cane to the Maryborough Sugar Factory, Mount Bauple Central Mill, Doolbi Mill and Isis Central Mill.

Besides sugar, a potential source of income for local farmers was dairy farming, which did not develop as a major industry in Queensland until the early 20th century. Initially, Queensland pastoralists or local farmers kept a few cows for domestic purposes, and small dairy operations supplied milk and butter to limited local markets. However, a combination of introduced grass species, technological advances, improved transportation networks and government encouragement through legislation encouraged the rise of commercial dairy farming in Queensland.

The advent of mechanical cream separators in Australia in the 1880s, the Babcock butterfat test in the 1890s, government grading of butter and the start of refrigerated shipping from Brisbane in 1884 also helped to encourage dairying. In addition, the spread of Queensland's railway network meant that some cream could be easily transported to butter factories and butter could be carried from the factories to ports for export. A further impetus for dairying was the Co-operative movement, where producers held shares in the enterprises that processed and sold their product.

In 1926 about 78% of Queensland's milk production went into making butter, and in 1928 about 10% of Queensland's population was largely dependent on the dairy industry. By 1929 the Wide Bay district (of which Hervey Bay was a part) was the second highest milk producer after the Moreton District. However, when the dairy industry declined in Queensland from the 1950s onwards, due to increased competition, a loss of butter markets and higher overheads, many farmers either switched to bulk milk production or left the industry. While some old dairies were upgraded by those farmers who remained in the industry, the rest were demolished, used for storage or left derelict.

In the Pialba district in the 1890s cream separators were too expensive for individual farmers to buy, and as a result a creamery opened at Aalborg (named after the town in Denmark, now known as Nikenbah). Creameries separated the cream from milk, so the cream could then be sent to a butter factory, and the farmers could take the remaining skim milk home to feed to their calves or pigs. Due to this process pig farming became a common adjunct to dairy farming. In 1901 a butter factory opened at Maryborough and Pialba farmers were able to buy their own cream separators from the factory, on credit against future payments for their cream.

Both sugar and cream have been produced on Colonsay, a farm which was first established by Anders Jensen. Born in Aalborg, Denmark in 1848 Jensen had fought in the Second Schleswig War of 1864. He arrived in Queensland on 4 March 1871 on the ship Reichstag out of Hamburg, along with 328 other immigrants, mostly Danes and Germans. Of the 6400 Danes in Australia by 1891, about half lived in Queensland, and as skilled farmers they played an important role in the Australian dairy industry.

Jensen married Magdalena (Madeline) Mortensen in Maryborough in 1872 and in January 1879 he applied to lease land in the parish of Urangan, County of March, under the Crown Lands Alienation Act (1876). Jensen resided on this selection, located about 4.5 kilometres (2.8 mi) northeast of Aalborg, from March 1879 and Portion number 1212, of 200 acres (81 ha), was surveyed in May of that year. The survey map indicated that the land was covered with "heavy forest" in the north and "scrub" in the south.

Portion 1212 was inspected in June 1883, and a rough map produced from this inspection shows that Jensen's house was situated in the south- east corner of the selection. This was a four roomed house, built with pine palings and covered with pine shingles. Other structures included a kitchen, fowl house, stable, pig house, and underground tank. Out of a total of 10 acres (4.0 ha) of scrub cleared and burnt, five acres of land were planted with sugar cane, and the rest was planted with corn, potatoes and fruit trees. The uncultivated land was used for cattle and horses.

Jensen applied to purchase his selection of 2nd Class pastoral land in November 1883. A Deed of Grant was registered to Jensen in February 1884, and later that month the farm was transferred to James Buchanan. Jensen repurchased the farm from Buchanan's widow early in 1902, and later that year he sold 40 acres (16 ha) of the farm (in the southeast corner, which included the site of his first house) to Hans Jorgensen. Anders Jensen is listed in the Queensland Post Office Directory as a farmer at Pialba from 1900 to 1910 and when his wife Magdalena died in June 1906 Anders is listed on her death certificate as living at Doolong Farm, Urangan. Anders died in 1923.

Doolong farm was sold to Alexander Macpherson, a railway guard, in late 1909. According to the Macpherson family the current farmhouse was built around this time, using timber from the property. While the current house was being constructed the Macphersons lived in another house (built by either Buchanan or Jensen) located very close by, but this later burnt down. A joint title for Alexander Macpherson and his son Alexander Macpherson junior was registered in February 1913, and the latter received full title to the land in February 1925. Both men and their wives lived in the c. 1909 house for several years prior to the younger Macpherson's sole ownership of the farm, and louvres were added to the front veranda to form a sitting area for the younger couple. At this time sugar was grown on the southern part of the farm, while the front 100 acres (40 ha) was used for grazing. The slab barn southeast of the house, with its handmilking bails at its east side, was most likely built by the Macphersons.

Alexander Macpherson junior died in April 1944, and the farm was transferred to Harold Spall in 1945 and then to Heinrich Steinhardt in 1949. Steinhardt grew sugar cane, ran a small dairy herd, and grew some small crops and melons. The paling fence in front of the house may have been built during his occupation, and the "walk-through" electrified dairy north of the house was probably built in the 1940s, either by Spall or Steinhardt. The old walk-through style of dairy has now been superseded within the dairy industry by herringbone or rotary-style dairies. Later owners of the farm included Herbert and Marjorie Dunn (1952) and Thomas and Rose Cornwell (1954). Walker and Jean Redman owned the farm briefly in 1968, and moved the dairy cows to another property, before the farm was resold to Marshall John McFie and Mavis Joan McFie, who moved in later that year.

After the McFies purchased the farm (which they named after the McFie clan's ancestral home, the island of Colonsay off the west coast of Scotland) they made some changes to the house, including enclosing the southeast verandah with casement windows and weatherboards, and relining the walls of the enclosed southwest verandah adjacent to the kitchen. Small residential blocks were subdivided off the farm for the McFie's children in 1984, 1986 and 1994, along with some land for road purposes, and by 2008 the farm covered 155.4 acres (62.9 ha). It is now used for beef cattle, and is slowly being enveloped by new housing estates as the urban area of Hervey Bay expands.

== Description ==
Colonsay Farm is located on Doolong Road, at Kawungan in the southern portion of the former City of Hervey Bay, and the farm buildings are accessed by a track that runs south from Doolong Road. The 1940s dairy sits about 170 metres (560 ft) north of the c. 1909 house. The separator shed is about 20 metres (66 ft) south-east of the house, under a large tree. The slab barn is about 60 metres (200 ft) south-east of the house, and two piggeries are located just to the south of the barn.

The 1940s dairy is a rectangular timber building, partly open to the east. It has single-skin walls clad with weatherboards and a gabled roof clad with metal sheets which extends to cover a small verandah to the north-east. The building is divided into three sections by two internal walls lined with vertical boards. From north to south these include: a hay storage room with a doorway to the east, and corrugated iron cladding to part of the west wall; a "walk-through" style bail section open to the yards to the east, with four bails and four exit doors in the west wall, along with stainless steel milk lines above the bails; and the milk room, containing a cream separator, milk cooling equipment, power board, electric motor and other machinery, two benches, wash trough and doors to the east and south. Floors are formed in concrete. Yards lie to the northeast and north of the dairy and are enclosed with timber post and rail fences. There is a concrete water tank to the south of the building.

The c. 1909 house is highset on timber stumps, with an understorey screened with timber battens. The basic plan of the house, which faces to the northeast, consists of a pyramid roofed central section which houses three bedrooms and a lounge, and a kitchen/bathroom wing which extends southwest from the northern rear corner of the house. There are verandahs to the northeast, southeast and southwest. The northwest end of the northeast verandah has been enclosed with weatherboards and timber louvres, and the southeast verandah is enclosed with weatherboards and casement windows to form several small rooms. The L-shaped southwest verandah is enclosed with fibrous cement sheeting, and the section of this verandah along the southeast side of the kitchen wing has become a dining room. There is a stove recess clad with corrugated metal sheeting at the southwest end of the kitchen. An internal stairway runs from the enclosed southwest verandah down to the understorey. Internal walls are lined with vertical timber boards.

The separator shed/cream house is a small, windowless, timber-framed structure clad with weatherboards. It is located under a large fig tree, stands on a concrete slab and has a steeply pitched roof clad with corrugated metal sheeting. There is a doorway on the south side and ventilation gaps with wire netting at the top of each wall. Inside the shed are some timber shelves fixed to the wall studs.

The slab barn is a gable roofed structure with two skillion roofed side rooms, to the east and west. Large round timber posts form the frame of the building, and the walls of the central gabled section are clad in corrugated metal sheeting. The walls of the skillion side sections to the east and west are constructed with vertical timber slabs and some corrugated metal sheeting. The eastern skillion section contains four cow bails formed by timber posts and rails. At the head of the bails small hatches are cut into the wall, enabling the cows to be fed chaff prepared in the centre section of the barn.

The two piggeries stand south of the slab barn, with timber yards and low shelters consisting of timber frames with skillion roofs clad with corrugated metal sheeting.

Structures on the site which are not considered to be of heritage significance include: a vehicle shed located between the slab barn and the house; and two open vehicle sheds located south-east of the house, just east of the separator shed.

== Heritage listing ==
Colonsay Farm (formerly Doolong Farm) was listed on the Queensland Heritage Register on 11 March 2011 having satisfied the following criteria.

The place is important in demonstrating the evolution or pattern of Queensland's history.

Colonsay Farm is an intact example of a small, early 20th century family dairy farm. It provides important evidence of the development of dairying in the Wide Bay District, a region which became the second highest milk producing area in Queensland. Dairy farming was once an important and widespread agricultural activity in Queensland, with about 10% of Queensland's population being largely dependent on the dairy industry by 1928.

The two types of dairy sheds on the farm, the handmilking bails in the slab barn, and the later "walk-through" dairy with electrically operated milking machines, demonstrate two phases in the evolution of dairy farming technology in Queensland.

The place demonstrates rare, uncommon or endangered aspects of Queensland's cultural heritage.

Colonsay Farm demonstrates a way of life, a function and a land use that was once common but is now uncommon. Small scale dairying was once a common means of earning regular income for farmers in rural areas of Queensland, particularly in the Wide Bay and Burnett region. After dairying declined in Queensland, many older dairy buildings were destroyed, abandoned or adapted for storage as farmers either left the industry or upgraded their buildings.

Farm complexes such as Colonsay, which still contain all the intact main elements of a pre-1950 dairy farm, such as a house, walk-through dairy, piggery, and separator shed or cream house, are increasingly uncommon.

The place is important in demonstrating the principal characteristics of a particular class of cultural places.

Colonsay Farm is an intact example of a small, family-operated dairy farm, developed in the early 20th century. Comprising a c. 1909 house with a fenced front yard, an early 20th century slab barn with cow bails, a 1940s walk-through dairy with yards, a separator shed/cream house under a large fig (ficus) tree and two piggeries, it includes many of the principal characteristics of an early dairy farm.
