= Susan River (Queensland) =

Susan
- Location of Susan River mouth in Queensland

Location
- Country: Australia
- State: Queensland
- Region: Wide Bay–Burnett
- Local government area: Fraser Coast

Physical characteristics
- Source
  - location: south of Hervey Bay
  - coordinates: 25°24′57″S 152°45′02″E
  - elevation: 14 m (46 ft)
- Mouth: confluence with the Mary River
  - location: River Heads
  - coordinates: 25°25′45″S 152°55′06″E
  - elevation: 279 m (915 ft)
- Length: 20 km (12 mi)

Basin features
- River system: Mary River
- Tributaries
  - right: Bunya Creek
- Islands: Kangaroo Island; Susan Island

The Susan River is a river in the Wide Bay–Burnett region of Queensland, Australia.

== Course and features ==
The river rises south of the town of Hervey Bay and west of the Maryborough Hervey Bay Road between the towns of Susan River and Walliebum. The river flows generally in an east by south direction, joined by the Bunya Creek, before reaching its confluence and emptying into the Mary River at River Heads in the Great Sandy Strait.

Along the banks of the Susan River is one of the largest remaining blue gum forests within the Mary River catchment area, together with melaleuca forests. At the river mouth, mangrove forests dominate the intertidal areas.

The Susan River Bridge carries the road that links Maryborough and Hervey Bay and was built in 1977. The bridged carries more than 10,000 vehicles each day. It remained unnamed until 2009.

In 2007, an unusual angler fish was found by a local fisherman. The fish was the first of its kind to have its genetic data recorded in an international fish catalogue called the Fish Barcode of Life using DNA barcoding.

Large saltwater crocodiles are occasionally seen the river and surrounding area, as well as dugongs, dolphins and sea turtles.

== See also ==
- List of rivers of Australia § Queensland
