= Wondunna, Queensland =

Wondunna Hervey Bay, Queensland
- Coordinates: 25.315°S 152.8608°E
- Population: 3,315 (2021 census)
  - Density: 480/km^{2} (1,244/sq mi)
- Postcode(s): 4655
- Area: 6.9 km^{2} (2.7 sq mi)
- Time zone: AEST (UTC+10:00)
- Location: 5.0 km (3 mi) SW of Urangan; 5.5 km (3 mi) SE of Pialba, Hervey Bay; 292 km (181 mi) N of Brisbane
- LGA(s): Fraser Coast Region
- State electorate(s): Hervey Bay
- Federal division(s): Hinkler
Suburbs around Wondunna:
Kawungan	Torquay	Urangan
Kawungan	Wondunna	Urangan
Nikenbah	Booral	Booral

Wondunna is a suburb of Hervey Bay in the Fraser Coast Region, Queensland, Australia. In the 2021 census, Wondunna had a population of 3,315 people.

== History ==
The suburb was named after Willie Wondunna, an Aboriginal man born on Fraser Island, who was sent to Victoria to track the Kelly Gang in 1880. His alternate tribal name was Caboonya.

Fraser Coast Anglican College opened in 1995.

== Demographics ==
In the 2016 census, Wondunna had a population of 2,677 people.

In the 2021 census, Wondunna had a population of 3,315 people.

== Education ==
Fraser Coast Anglican College is a private primary and secondary (Prep-12) school for boys and girls at Doolong South Road (25.3171°S 152.8525°E). In 2018, the school had an enrolment of 642 students with 48 teachers (45 full-time equivalent) and 41 non-teaching staff (32 full-time equivalent).

There are no government schools in Wondunna. The nearest government primary schools are Sandy Strait State School in neighbouring Urangan to the north-east and Kawungan State School in neighbouring Kawungan to the north-west. The nearest government secondary school is Urangan State High School, also in Urangan. There are also other non-government schools in the suburbs of Hervey Bay.

== Amenities ==
St John's Anglican Church is at 2-8 Gilston Street (corner of Doolong Road, 25.3077°S 152.8576°E).
