= Kawungan, Queensland =

Kawungan
- Suburb
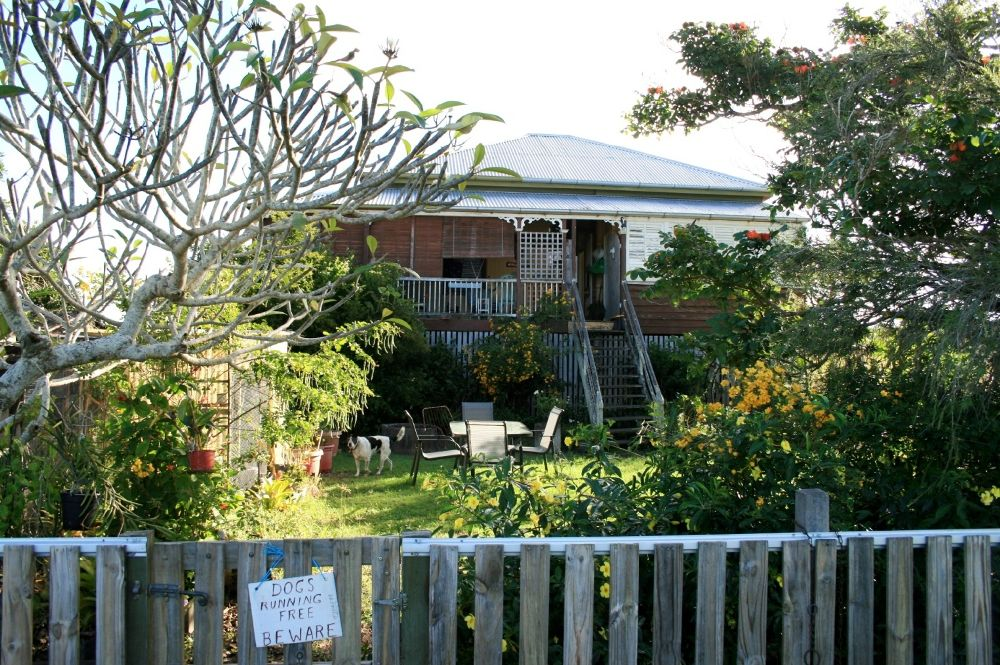
- Heritage-listed Colonsay Farm (former Doolong Farm), 2006

- Interactive map of Kawungan
- Coordinates: 25.3066°S 152.8469°E
- Country: Australia
- State: Queensland
- City: Hervey Bay
- LGA: Fraser Coast Region
- Location: 3.0 km (1.9 mi) SE of Pialba; 35.9 km (22.3 mi) NE of Maryborough; 121 km (75 mi) SE of Bundaberg; 298 km (185 mi) N of Brisbane

Government
  - State electorate: Hervey Bay
  - Federal division: Hinkler

Area
  - Total: 5.7 km^{2} (2.2 sq mi)

Population
  - Total: 5,460 (2021 census)
  - Density: 958/km^{2} (2,481/sq mi)
- Time zone: UTC+10:00 (AEST)
- Postcode: 4655
Suburbs around Kawungan
Pialba	Scarness	Torquay
Urraween	Kawungan	Wondunna
Nikenbah	Nikenbah	Wondunna

Kawungan is a suburb of Hervey Bay in the Fraser Coast Region, Queensland, Australia. In the 2021 census, Kawungan had a population of 5,460 people.

== Geography ==
The suburb is mostly flat land ranging from 20 to 30 metres (66 to 98 ft) above sea level with some hillier terrain towards the south of the suburb, up to 60 metres (200 ft). The northern part of the suburb is used for residential purposes while the southern part of the suburb, which is on the current urban edge of Hervey Bay's development, is partly residential and partly farmland, used for grazing on native vegetation.

== History ==
The suburb was officially named and bounded by Queensland Place Names Board on 1 September 1980. Kawungan is reported to be from the Kabi language word, with kai wung referring to the scrub magpie (Strepera graculina) and dha/gun meaning place, thus place of the scrub magpie.

Hervey Bay Special School opened on 11 March 1986.

Kawungan State School opened on 29 January 1991.

== Demographics ==
In the 2016 census, Kawungan had a population of 4,816 people.

In the 2021 census, Kawungan had a population of 5,460 people.

== Heritage listings ==
Kawungan has a number of heritage-listed sites, including:

- 125 Doolong Road: Colonsay Farm (former Doolong Farm, 25.3132°S 152.8477°E)

== Education ==
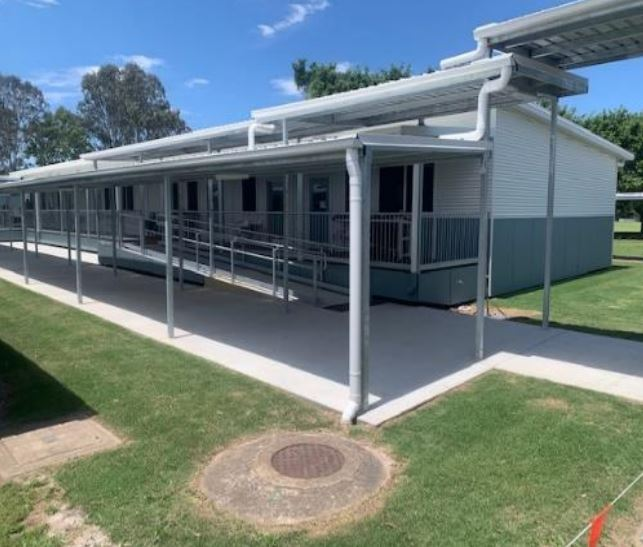
Kawungan State School, 2022

Kawungan State School is a government primary (Early Childhood to Year 6) school for boys and girls on the eastern side of Grevillea Street (25.2972°S 152.8496°E). In 2018, the school had an enrolment of 897 students with 73 teachers (64 full-time equivalent) and 44 non-teaching staff (28 full-time equivalent). It includes a special education program.

Hervey Bay Special School is a special primary and secondary (Prep–12) school for boys and girls at 23 Frangipanni Avenue (25.2963°S 152.8523°E). In 2018, the school had an enrolment of 106 students with 29 teachers (28 full-time equivalent) and 37 non-teaching staff (24 full-time equivalent).

There are no secondary schools in the suburb. The nearest government secondary schools are Hervey Bay State High School in neighbouring Pialba to the north-west and Urangan State High School in Urangan to the east.

== Amenities ==
There are a number of parks in the area, including:

- Areca Drive Park (25.2959°S 152.8471°E)
- Arlington Court Park (25.2929°S 152.8394°E)
- Cromdale Circuit Park (25.3050°S 152.8448°E)
- Daydream Court (25.2934°S 152.8438°E)
- Denmans Camp Road (25.2997°S 152.8558°E)
- Lilley Park (25.2957°S 152.8514°E)
- Low Park (25.2962°S 152.8548°E)
- Mackay Drive Park (25.2991°S 152.8435°E)
- Margaret Lin Park (25.3062°S 152.8359°E)
- Meledie Ave Park (25.2995°S 152.8479°E)
- Nelsley Court Park (25.3088°S 152.8351°E)
- Oleander Ave Park (25.2931°S 152.8459°E)

Rainbow Gully Community Garden is in Kawungan.

Baycrest retirement village is at 99 Doolong Road (25.3087°S 152.8436°E). It includes the Baycrest RSL aged care facility (25.3080°S 152.8448°E).

A chapel of the Church of Jesus Christ of Latter-day Saints is at 29 Grevillea Road (25.2981°S 152.8489°E).
