= Torquay, Queensland =

Torquay
- Suburb
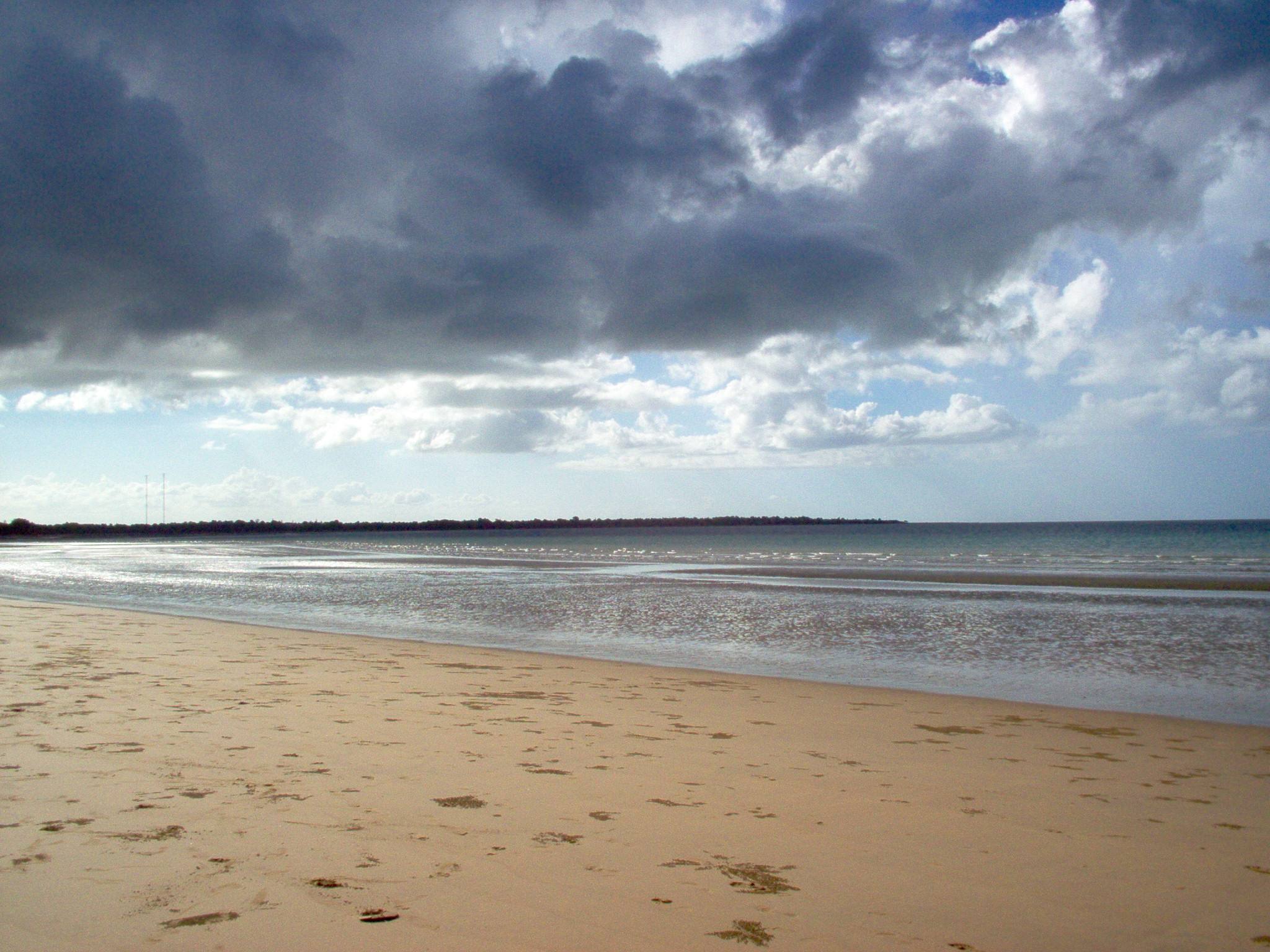
- Beach at Torquay in 2006

- Interactive map of Torquay
- Coordinates: 25.2913°S 152.8733°E
- Country: Australia
- State: Queensland
- City: Hervey Bay
- LGA: Fraser Coast Region
- Location: 31.7 km (19.7 mi) NE of Maryborough; 124 km (77 mi) SE of Bundaberg; 298 km (185 mi) N of Brisbane

Government
  - State electorate: Hervey Bay
  - Federal division: Wide Bay

Area
  - Total: 4.7 km^{2} (1.8 sq mi)
- Elevation: 4 m (13 ft)

Population
  - Total: 6,533 (2021 census)
  - Density: 1,390/km^{2} (3,600/sq mi)
- Time zone: UTC+10:00 (AEST)
- Postcode: 4655
- Mean max temp: 30.0 °C (86.0 °F)
- Mean min temp: 16.6 °C (61.9 °F)
- Annual rainfall: 1,061.6 mm (41.80 in)
Suburbs around Torquay
Coral Sea	Coral Sea	Coral Sea
Scarness	Torquay	Urangan
Kawungan	Wondunna	Urangan

Torquay (/tɔːrkiː/ tor-KEY) is a coastal suburb in Hervey Bay in the Fraser Coast Region, Queensland, Australia. In the 2021 census, Torquay had a population of 6,533 people.

== Geography ==
Torquay is located 298 kilometres (185 mi) north of Brisbane. Torquay is one of five beachside suburbs in Hervey Bay that is made up of primarily residential homes with some tourist accommodation in apartment buildings.

== History ==
The name Torquay might appear to be a reference to the English seaside town of Torquay, but its origins are believed to be a corruption of Kabi language words dhakki-talbur, reduced to dhakki meaning either a place of short stones, a rocky reef or a stone axe. The similarity of the sound of the word probably gave rise to the English-town spelling.

Torquay Provisional School opened on 21 January 1901. On 1 January 1909, it became Torquay State School.

The Pialba-to-Urangan section of the Hervey Bay railway opened on 19 December 1913 with Torquay railway station (25.2895°S 152.8696°E) serving the local area. The line closed on 30 June 1993. The railway station site has been redeveloped as housing.

In 1919, a Baptist church opened in Torquay. It was erected by the Maryborough Baptist Church. Tenders were called in June 1919 with Messrs Payne and Jacobi chosen as the contractors in July 1919. The new church was officially opened on Saturday 4 October 1919 with a special excursion train from Maryborough arranged for those attending the opening. Over 500 people travelled to attend the opening. The church was at approx 270 Torquay Terrace (25.2864°S 152.8671°E). The church building has subsequently been relocated to 44 Wheeley Road, Booral, where it is used as a private residence.

All Souls' Anglican Church opened in 1968. It closed circa 1988.

Star of the Sea Catholic School opened on 23 January 1984.

== Demographics ==
In the 2006 census, Torquay had a population of 5,693 people.

In the 2016 census, Torquay had a population of 6,316 people.

In the 2021 census, Torquay had a population of 6,533 people.

== Education ==
Torquay State School is a government primary (Prep-6) school for boys and girls at Tavistock Street (25.2877°S 152.8649°E). In 2018, the school had an enrolment of 441 students with 36 teachers (31 full-time equivalent) and 25 non-teaching staff (15 full-time equivalent). It includes a special education program.

Star of the Sea Catholic School is a Catholic primary (Prep-6) school for boys and girls at Hughes Road (25.3069°S 152.8739°E). In 2018, the school had an enrolment of 349 students with 23 teachers (20 full-time equivalent) and 18 non-teaching staff (9 full-time equivalent).

There is no secondary school in Torquay. The nearest government secondary school is Urangan State High School in neighbouring Urangan to the east.

== Amenities ==
Hervey Bay Uniting Church is on the north-east corner of Exeter Street and Tavistock Streets (25.2934°S 152.8653°E).

The Kingdom Hall of Jehovah's Witnesses is at 88 Exeter Street (25.2938°S 152.8696°E).
