= Hervey Bay (Queensland) =

Bay in Queensland, Australia

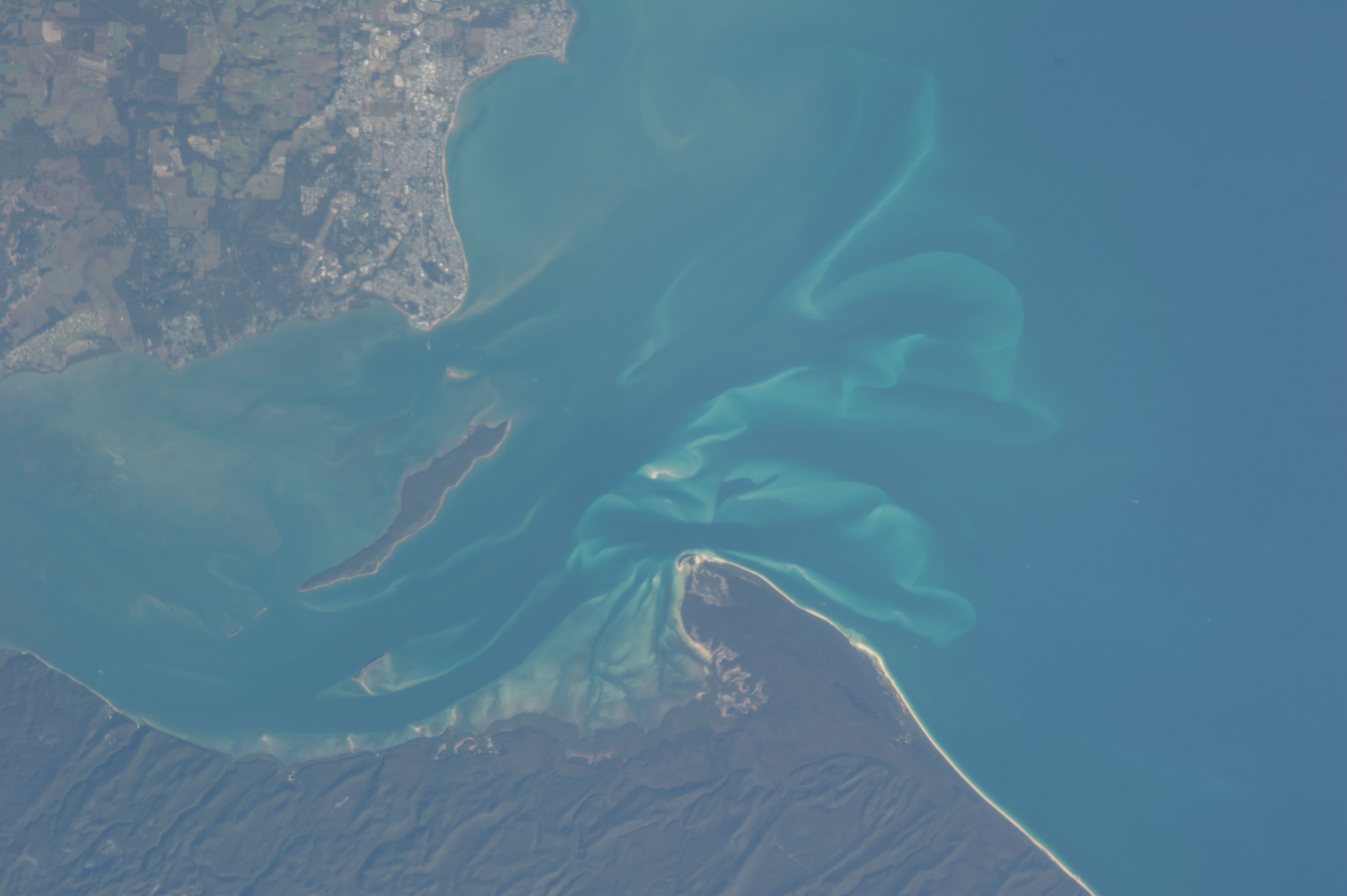
- View from the International Space Station of the town of Hervey Bay (upper left), the Great Sandy Strait (left), Fraser Island (lower) and Hervey Bay (upper and right), 2013

- Location within Queensland
- Coordinates: 25.0036°S 152.8433°E
- Surface area: 4,000 square kilometres (1,500 sq mi)
- Max. depth: 30 metres (98 ft)

Hervey Bay is a bay of the Coral Sea in the Bundaberg Region and Fraser Coast Region of Queensland, Australia. The bay covers 4,000 square kilometres (1,500 sq mi) with a main opening facing northwards. The northern end of the bay is about 80 km wide and its average depth is about 20 metres. In the south of the bay lies the Great Sandy Strait. The Mary River, Burrum River and Burnett River flow into the bay. Hervey Bay is partly protected from oceanic swells by the southern extension of the Great Barrier Reef. To the east of the bay is K'Gari (formerly known as Fraser Island).

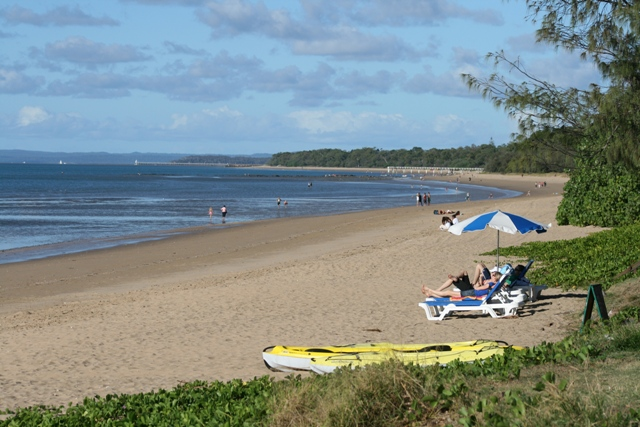
Hervey Bay coastline, 2007

It is known for its whale watching. Hervey Bay is also a spawning region for temperate pelagic fish. Fish populations have supported a fisheries industry that is worth several tens of millions of dollars. Aquaculture is developing into a significant industry for the bay. Recreational fishing around the bay is a tourist drawcard.

Parts of the bay are protected within the Great Sandy Marine Park.

== History ==
Hervey Bay was logged by Lieutenant James Cook on 21 May 1770 on his exploration of the eastern Australian coast in the HM Bark Endeavour. He named it Hervey's Bay after his return to England, after Admiral Augustus John Hervey who was Lord of the Admiralty from 1771 to 1775.

In July and August 1799 Matthew Flinders chartered the coast from Moreton Bay to Hervey Bay in the Norfolk. Although he established that Fraser Island was not a peninsula (as was then believed) but an island, he failed to find a navigable channel through the Great Sandy Strait which separates the island from the mainland. His explorations of the area is commemorated by a monument called Matthew Flinders Lookout at the top of an escarpment facing the bay in Dayman Park, Urangan (25.2893°S 152.9080°E).

Lieutenant Joseph Dayman was the first to navigate through the Great Sandy Strait on 10 November 1846 in a small decked boat called the Asp. It had been intended that Dayman rendezvous with HMS Rattlesnake but that ship had already departed. Dayman decided it was safer to take the Asp through the Great Sandy Strait rather than risk taking the route to the ocean side of the Fraser Island as he was concerned about the Breakpoint Spit at the north of Fraser Island.

Urangan Pier was built in the bay between 1913 and 1917.

== Whales ==
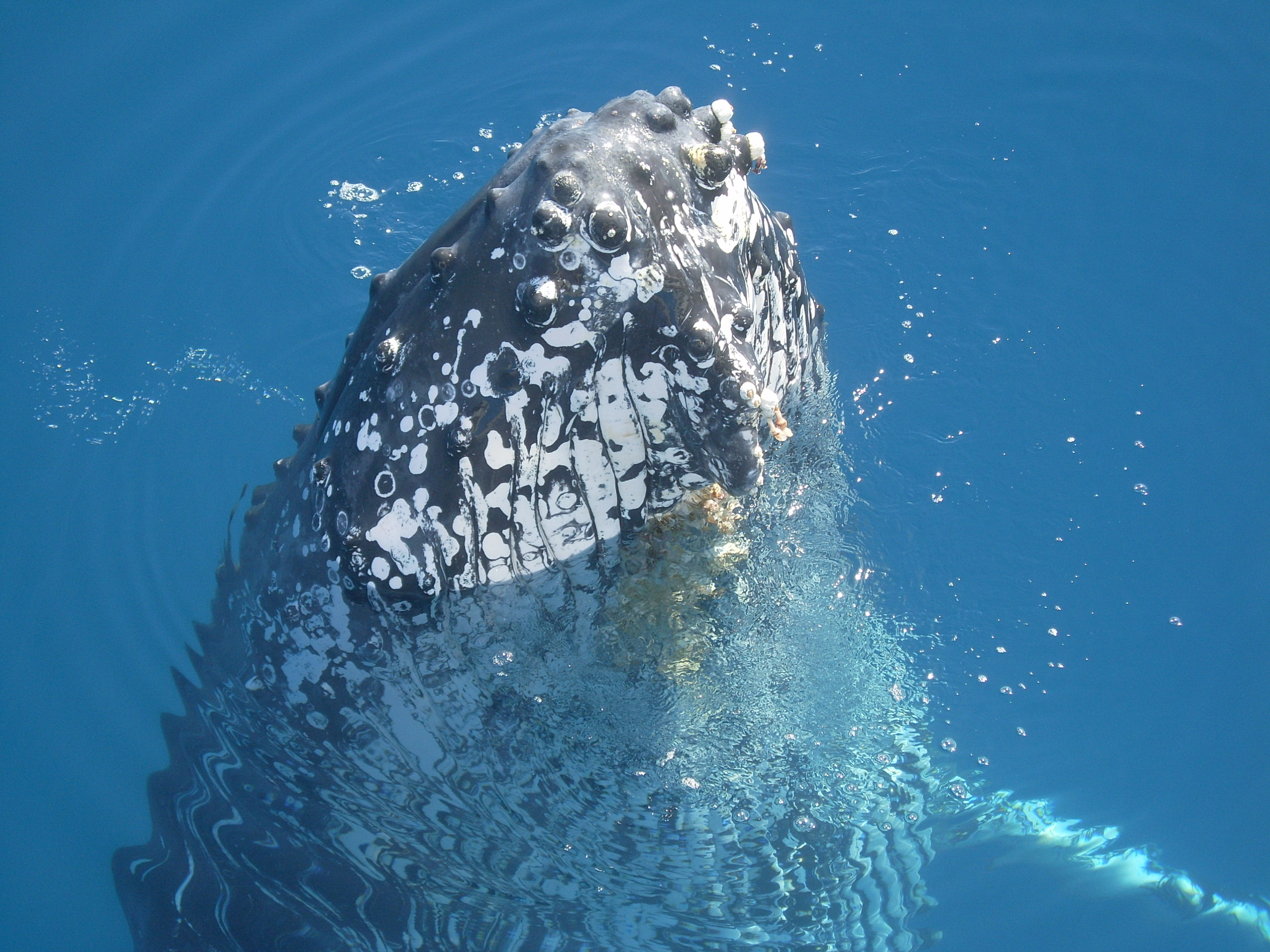
A humpback whales during a whale watching tour

Hervey Bay is a resting place during the annual migration of approximately 35,000 humpback whales along Australia's east coast from the Great Barrier Reef down to the Antarctic Ocean. This migration involves approximately one third of the world's humpback whales. Most female whales each spend about two weeks in Hervey Bay nursing their calves. Young whales also rest in the bay but very few adult male whales rest in the bay. Whales can normally be seen in the bay between July and November each year, where they exhibit many playful behaviours. There are many companies offering whale watching tours in the bay during that time. There are strict rules applying to the operation of boats in the vicinity of whales to avoid harm or stress to the whales. Due to the popularity of the albino whale Migaloo (first sighted in 1991), there are particularly strict rules relating to approaching Migaloo or any seemingly white whale that might be Migaloo.

Southern right whales have also been recorded with increasing sighting rates.

== Seagrass meadows ==
In 1988, Hervey Bay supported more than 1,000 square kilometres (390 sq mi) of seagrass meadows. These meadows supported a population of around 2,000 dugongs. Some species grow at a depth of 28 metres (92 ft).

Major seagrass loss occurred in 1992 and 1999 due to cyclone and flood events. Not only was light blocked killing the sea grass in deeper parts but also the meadows experienced the physical removal of seagrass caused by the cyclone and storms in the shallow areas. The potential flood-associated surge in herbicide concentration may have also been a factor.

In 2022, monitoring of seagrass meadows across Hervey Bay by James Cook University showed almost none remaining in known mapped areas. The loss is attributed to sediment from floods blocking sunlight to the depths where the sea grass grows.
