= Urangan, Queensland =

Urangan
- Suburb
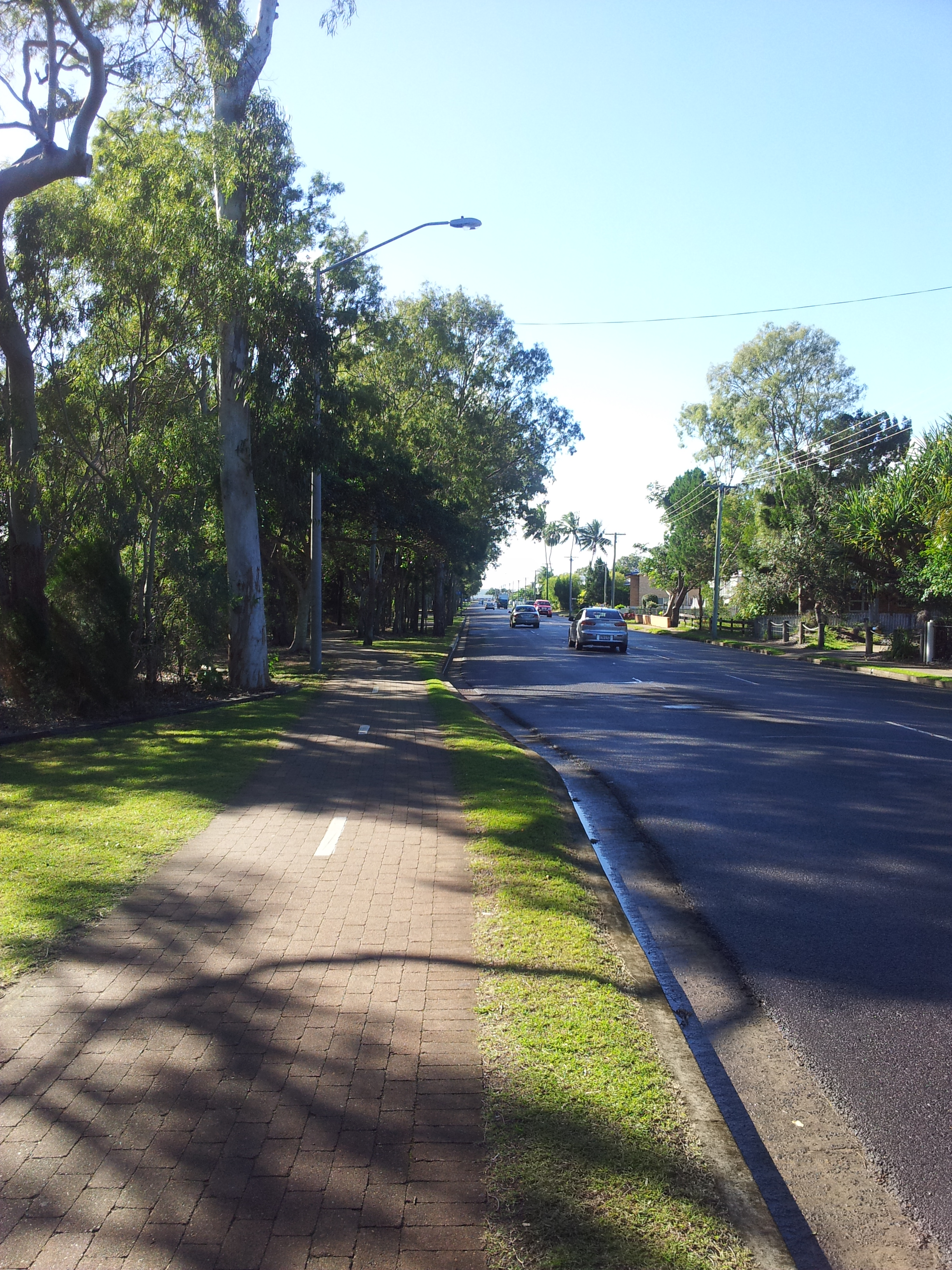
- The Esplanade, Urangan

- Interactive map of Urangan
- Coordinates: 25.3025°S 152.8886°E
- Country: Australia
- State: Queensland
- City: Hervey Bay
- LGA: Fraser Coast Region
- Location: 6.8 km (4.2 mi) W of Pialba; 41.1 km (25.5 mi) NE of Maryborough; 294 km (183 mi) N of Brisbane

Government
  - State electorate: Hervey Bay
  - Federal division: Hinkler

Area
  - Total: 17.7 km^{2} (6.8 sq mi)

Population
  - Total: 10,988 (2021 census)
  - Density: 620.8/km^{2} (1,608/sq mi)
- Time zone: UTC+10:00 (AEST)
- Postcode: 4655
Suburbs around Urangan
Torquay	Hervey Bay	Hervey Bay
Torquay	Urangan	Great Sandy Strait
Wondunna	Booral	Great Sandy Strait

Urangan is a coastal suburb of the city of Hervey Bay in the Fraser Coast Region, Queensland, Australia. In the 2021 census, Urangan had a population of 10,988 people.

== Geography ==
The locality is bounded to the north by Hervey Bay (the bay not the town, 25.00361°S 152.84333°E) and to the east by the northern end of the Great Sandy Strait (and beyond it, Fraser Island).

Dayman Point is a headland (25.2843°S 152.9050°E).

Shelly Beach is a beach that extends into neighbouring Torquay (25.2816°S 152.8828°E).

Urangan Boat Harbour is a harbour (25.2958°S 152.9105°E).

Hervey Bay Airport is in the south-west of the suburb with the runway extending into neighbouring Wondunna to the east.

== History ==
The name Urangan is derived from Kabi language, either from the word yuangan meaning dugong, or yerengen meaning small shell fish.

The local landmarks of Dayman Spit and Dayman Point were named after Lieutenant Joseph Dayman of the Royal Navy. Dayman was the first European to navigate through the Great Sandy Strait on 10 November 1846 in a small decked boat called the Asp. It had been intended that Dayman rendezvous with HMS Rattlesnake but that ship had already departed. Dayman decided it was safer to take the Asp through the Great Sandy Strait instead rather than risk taking the route by the ocean side of Fraser Island as he wanted to avoid rounding the Breaksea Spit.

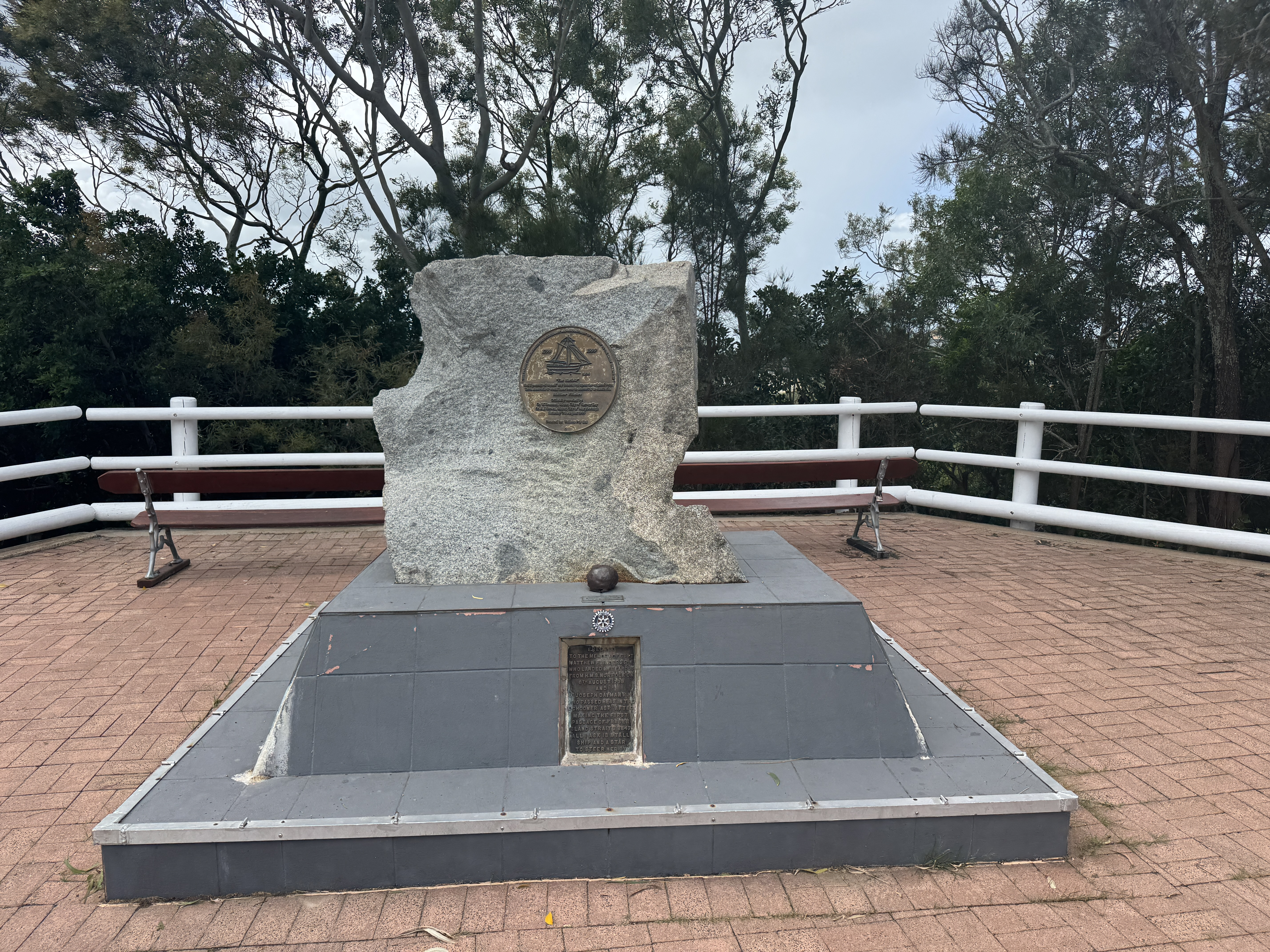
The Matthew Flinders memorial in Dayman Park, Urangan, was erected in 1999 to mark the bicentenary of the 1799 visit by Matthew Flinders to the Great Sandy Strait.

Urangan State School opened circa 1890 and closed in 1915.

The Hervey Bay railway line from Maryborough passed through the suburb, terminating at the Urangan Pier. The line reached Pialba on 18 December 1896. However, construction of the extension to Urangan did not commence immediately as the original plan had been for the Vernon Coal and Railway Company to construct that section of the line to transport Burrum coal to the pier. However, the company did not build the line. On 20 December 1911, the Queensland Government decided to build the extension to Urangan, which was officially opened on 19 December 1913 by the Minister for Railways Walter Paget.

Urangan Road State School opened on 22 February 1915. In 1956 it was renamed Bingham Road State School. It closed in 1960. Despite the name, the school was 847 Booral Road (formerly Nikenbah Bingham Road), Bunya Creek.

Urangan Point State School opened on 9 October 1916.

All Saints' Anglican Church was dedicated in 1918. It was dedicated again on 6 June 1965 by Archbishop Philip Strong. It closed during 1990.

On Saturday 1 November 1919 a Methodist church was opened at 22 Kent Street (25.2870°S 152.9013°E). The church building had originally been a church hall in Maryborough but was then relocated Torquay by Fenwick White where it was used by the Methodist congregation and a number of denominations for services. Although it was believed White had intended for the Methodist congregation to inherit the church upon his death, this did not occur and the church was offered for sale after White's death in 1917. The Methodist congregation decided to buy the church building and relocate it to the Kent Street site which they purchased. On Saturday 8 September 1951 a stump capping ceremony was held at the commencement of the enlargement of the church building. The enlarged church was officially re-opened on Saturday 10 November 1951.

On 23 December 1945 the Beulah Mission Church (part of the Assemblies of God) opened at 14 King Street (corner of Beulah Street, 25.2828°S 152.8995°E).

The last ship docked at the Urangan pier in January 1985.

Urangan State High School opened on 1 January 1992.

Sandy Strait State School opened on 30 January 1995.

== Demographics ==
In the 2011 census, Urangan had a population of 9,169 people.

In the 2016 census, Urangan had a population of 9,764 people.

In the 2021 census, Urangan had a population of 10,988 people.

== Heritage listings ==
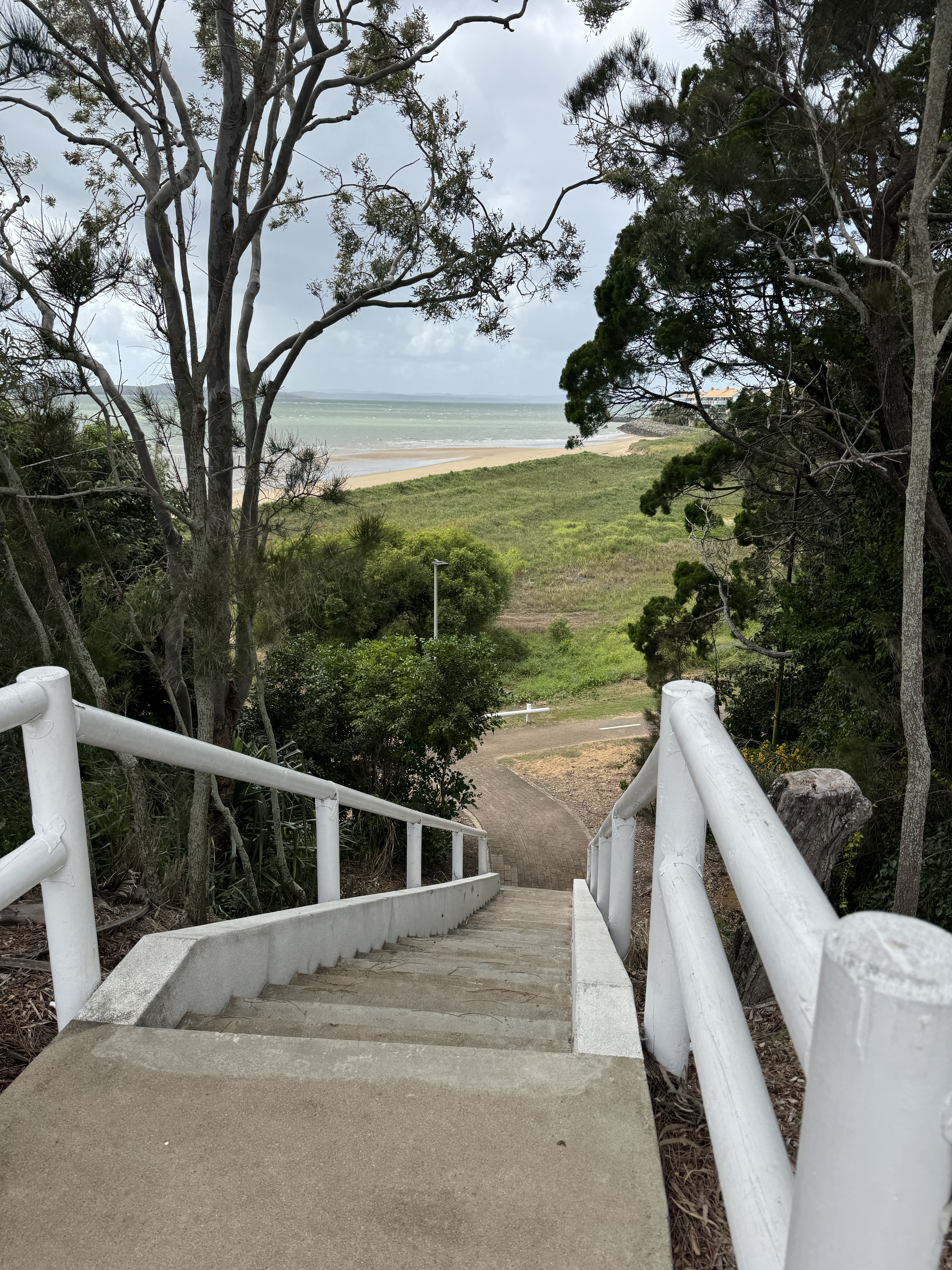
The Dayman Park Steps at Dayman Park, Urangan, were constructed in 1952 and are listed on the Fraser Coast Local Heritage Register.

Urangan has a State heritage-listed site:

- Urangan Point State School, Block D, Miller Street

There are also several places listed on the Fraser Coast Local Heritage Register, including the Dayman Park Steps.

== Education ==
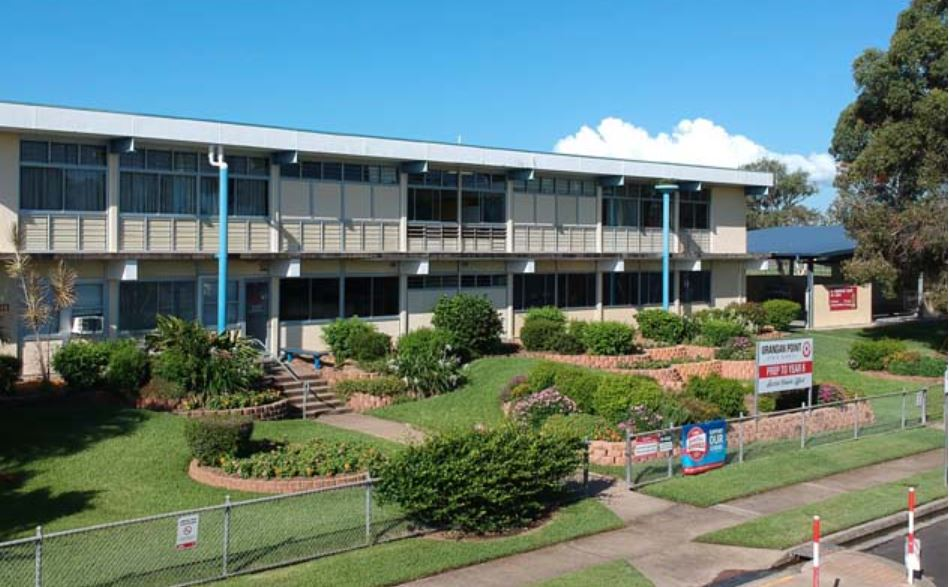
Urangan Point State School, 2024

Urangan Point State School is a government primary (Prep–6) school for boys and girls at Miller Street (25.2911°S 152.9020°E). In 2018, the school had an enrolment of 400 students with 36 teachers (30 full-time equivalent) and 24 non-teaching staff (14 full-time equivalent). It includes a special education program.

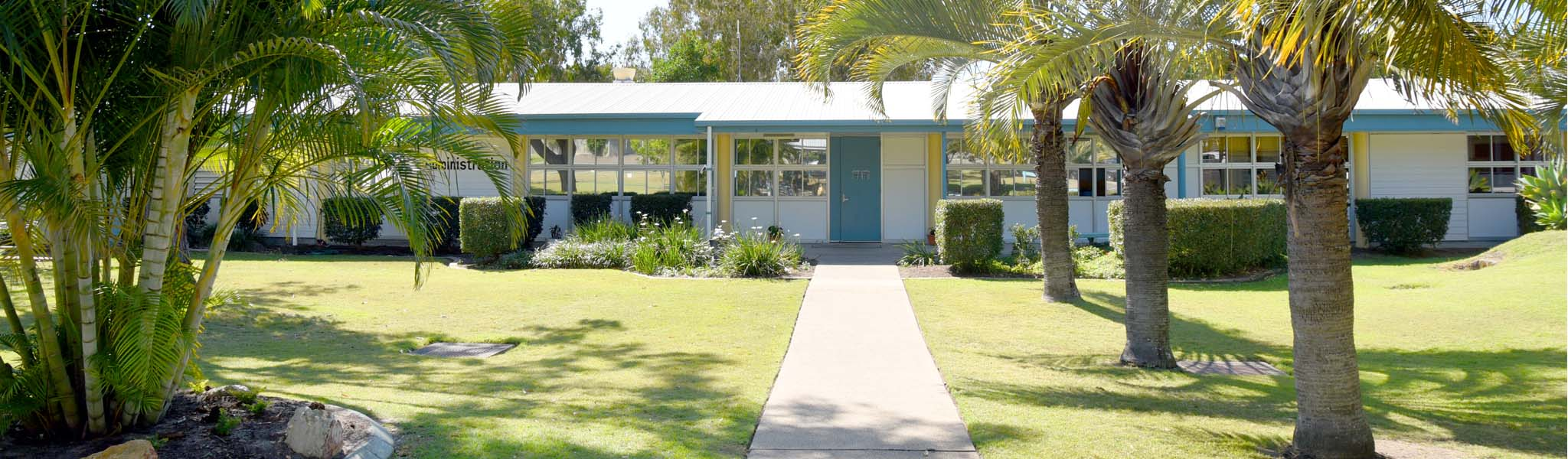
Sandy Strait State School, 2020

Sandy Strait State School is a government primary (Prep–6) school for boys and girls at Robert Street (25.3004°S 152.8753°E). In 2018, the school had an enrolment of 713 students with 49 teachers (46 full-time equivalent) and 37 non-teaching staff (22 full-time equivalent). It includes a special education program.

Urangan State High School is a government secondary (7–12) school for boys and girls at Robert Street (25.2966°S 152.8760°E). In 2018, the school had an enrolment of 1712 students with 146 teachers (139 full-time equivalent) and 66 non-teaching staff (50 full-time equivalent). It includes a special education program.

The University of the Sunshine Coast operates a turtle research and rehabilitation centre in Dayman Park at Urangan. It was opened in May 2026.

== Amenities ==
The Urangan branch of the Queensland Country Women's Association meets at 19 Pulgul Street.

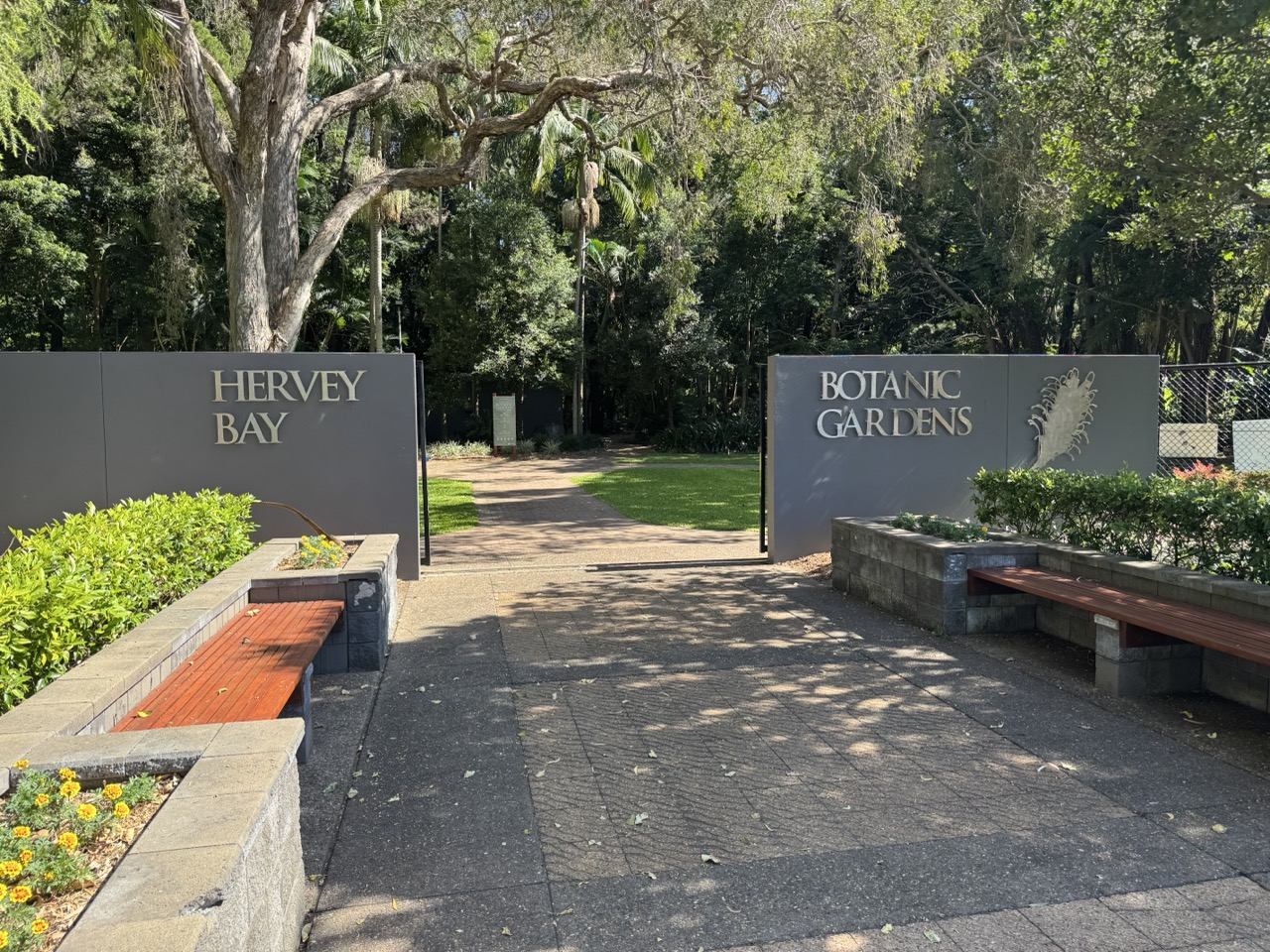
The entrance to the Hervey Bay Botanic Gardens

== Attractions ==
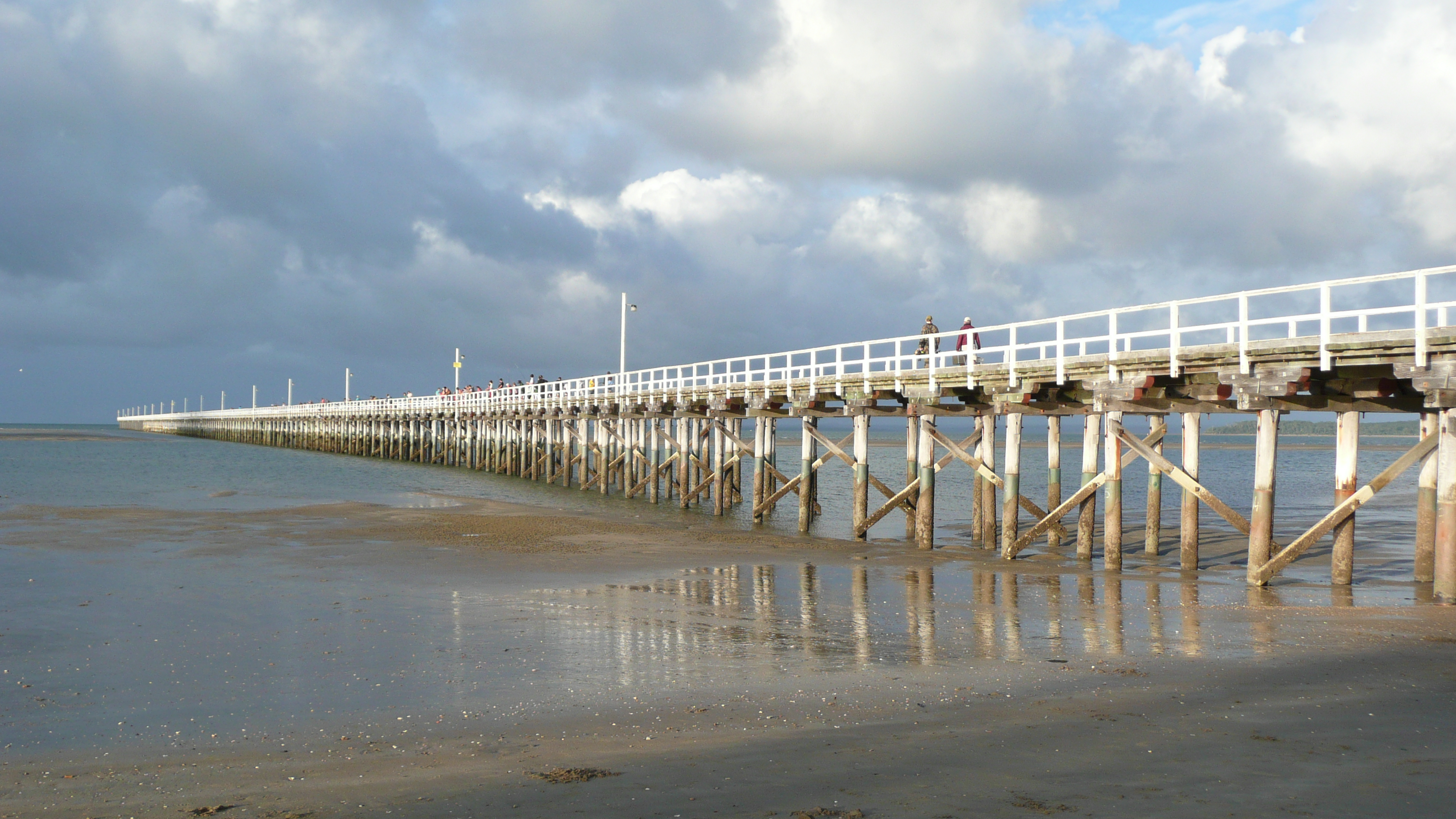
Urangan Pier, 2010

Whale watching tours and ferries to Fraser Island depart from the marina at Urangan.

Urangan Pier extends almost 1 kilometre (0.62 mi) into the bay, making it one of the longest piers in Australia. It is popular for walking along with spectacular views of the coast and marine life such as dolphins and stringrays. Fishing is permitted from the pier with whiting being one of the common fish caught there.

The Hervey Bay Botanic Gardens is located in Urangan on a 26-hectare (64-acre) site. It houses a collection of about 20,000 orchids and features a Chinese Garden and a labrynth.

Reefworld, an aquarium, is located at Dayman Park in Urangan.

== See also ==
- Fraser Coast Region
