= Roma Government Complex =

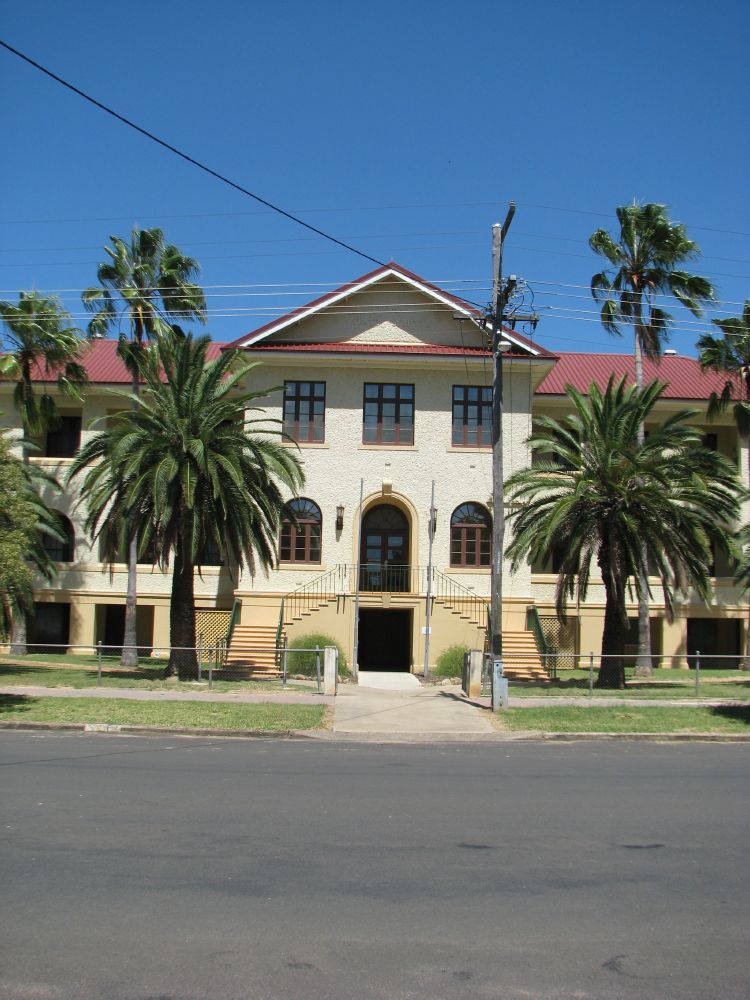
- Roma Government Complex, 2010

- Location within Queensland Location within Australia
- 26.5701°S 148.7905°E
- Location: 42 Bungil Street, Roma, Maranoa Region, Queensland, Australia

History
- Design period: 1919–1930s (interwar period)
- Built: 1937

Site notes
- Architect: Department of Public Works (Queensland)
- Architectural style: Classicism

Queensland Heritage Register
- Official name: Roma Government Complex, Roma State School
- Type: state heritage (built)
- Designated: 4 September 1998
- Reference no.: 601536
- Significant period: 1930s (historical); 1930s (fabric); 1937–1986 (social)
- Significant components: school/school room

Roma Government Complex is a heritage-listed former state school and now government offices at 42 Bungil Street, Roma, Maranoa Region, Queensland, Australia. It was designed by Department of Public Works (Queensland) and built in 1937. It was also known as Roma State School. It was added to the Queensland Heritage Register on 4 September 1998.

== History ==
Roma Government Complex is a three storey rendered brick building, influenced by Inter War Mediterranean style, facing Bungil Street. It was constructed in 1937 as the main building of Roma State School, providing primary education to children of Roma and district.

Roma was the principal town of the Mount Abundance district, which was established as a pastoral and agricultural region after exploration by Thomas Mitchell, Surveyor General of New South Wales in 1846. It was originally settled by squatters, who established it as primarily a sheep grazing area. The township of Roma was proclaimed in September 1862, the first town formed in Queensland after its separation from New South Wales in 1859. Roma was named after Lady Diamantina Bowen (née di Roma), wife of the first Governor of Queensland, Sir George Ferguson Bowen. She was the daughter of a Governor of the Ionian Islands and her maiden name was Countess Diamantina Georgina di Roma. Surveyor McDowall laid out the town reserving a section for public buildings bounded by Bungil, Charles, McDowall and Gregory streets. The first land sales were held in September 1863. The town of Roma was declared a municipality in 1867. Roma flourished with the advent of the Western railway line in the 1880s, ensuring the efficient transportation of stock and produce to the coastal ports. The vast Great Artesian Basin was tapped in Queensland in the late 1880s and early 1890s, securing an alternative water supply for cattle and sheep.

In 1870 Roma State School, comprising simple timber school building and teachers residence, opened with an enrolment of 133 pupils. The Reserve for a National School, a two-acre site bounded by Bungil, Wyndham and Arthur Streets and two residential allotments, was proclaimed in 1871. A second school building, facing Wyndham Street, was constructed in 1899, allowing the separation of male and female instruction. This school building was enlarged through addition and verandah enclosure, thereby creating a series of new classrooms. In 1912 a verandah was enclosed to create space for a high school, with a separate site established and opened on 2 August 1920. In 1939 the original school building was sold to the RSL and relocated to Queen Street.

In 1934, the Health Inspector Chas Clark, began to agitate for a new school building. He referred to the existing building environment as problematic in respect to the physical and educational development of the children. The Roma School Committee pressed for a new building, alluding to the established use of the Unemployment Relief Scheme for the construction of school buildings and departmental preference for provision of buildings for coastal urban centres. The plans were prepared by Maurice Guthrie, of the Architectural Branch of the Department of Public Works, in January 1935, however it took the School Committee a further two years to obtain an undertaking from the government on the construction of a new building. Brick was used as it was thought to be more substantial and cost effective, but perhaps more importantly, it provided employment for greater numbers of tradesmen, during the years of economic depression.

The building was occupied in July 1938 and officially opened on 25 February 1939, providing accommodation for 432 children. It comprised eleven classrooms; a head teacher, male and female teachers rooms; cloakrooms and play area facilities underneath at the basement level. Conforming to sectional design, covered verandahs were incorporated on both the ground and first floor, along all but the southern side of the building. Ten of the classrooms, five on each floor, were interconnected by the use of sliding partitions. A stage was created by the incorporation of a raised floor beneath the western class room on the ground floor, providing multi functional use of class room space. The design was comparable to other brick school buildings built during this period of economic depression and reflects educational methodology of the time.

A combination of inadequate size of the site for outdoor facilities, burgeoning attendance and movement to open plan teaching methods in the late 1960s and early 1970s saw major changes to Roma State School. The addition of a new library behind the main school building, in 1972, prevented the early suggested relocation of the school. However, in 1974, the school was divided into Roma Infants School for years 1–3, on a separate site in Quinton Street, and Roma Junior School for years 4–7, at the Bungil Street site. In 1986 the Education Department piloted a new prototype of school in the Roma Middle School incorporating grades 4–10 on the one larger 14 acre site at Cottel Street.

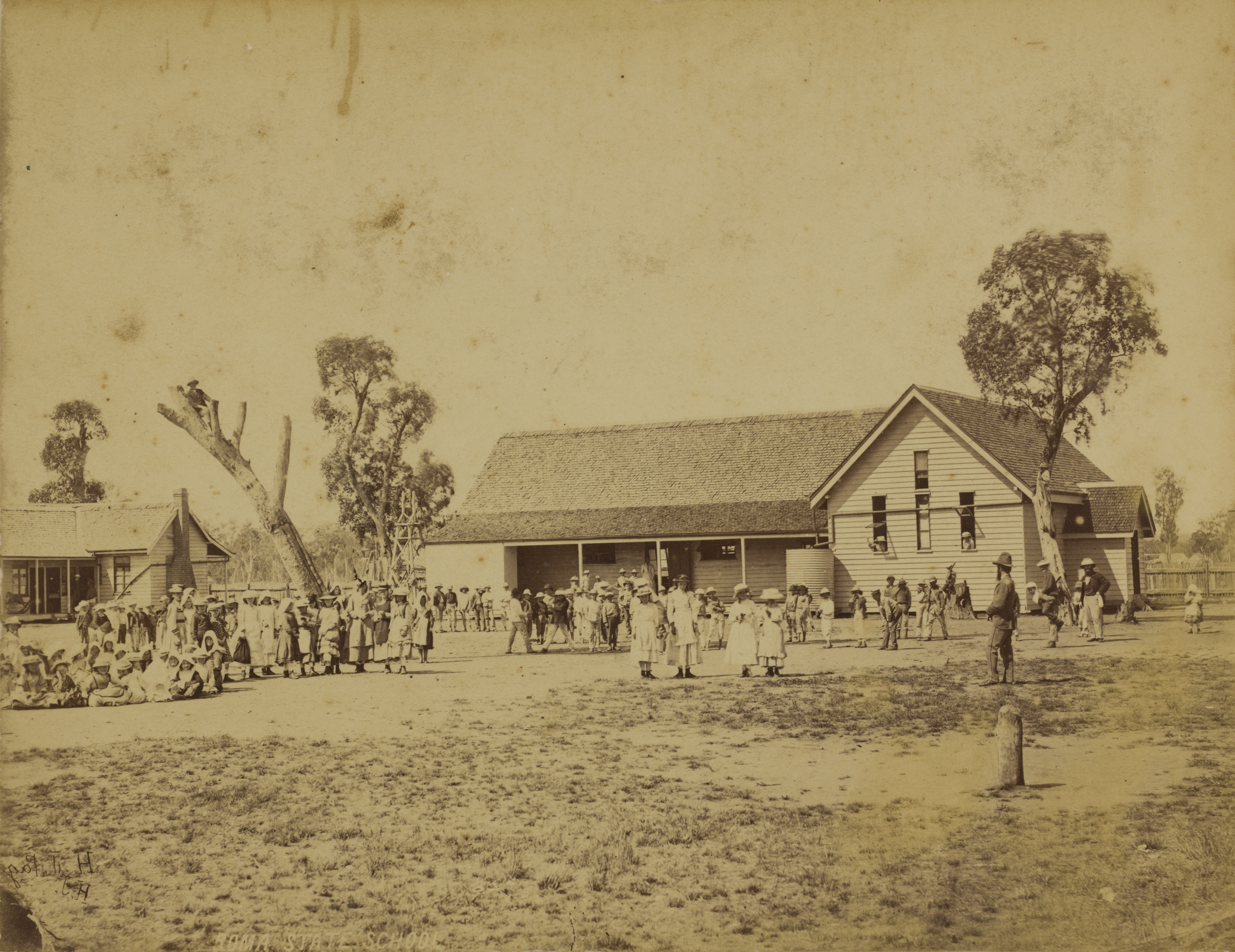
Photograph of Roma State School

In 1987, the Bungil Street school buildings were remodelled as Roma Government Complex accommodating the regional offices of the Education Department, Water Resources, Boating and Fishing and Forestry. In 1997, the reserve was subdivided into three lots with buildings on the front section. The rear section of the land, comprising two lots, was sold to the Bungil Shire Council and the Uniting Church in 1997.

== Description ==
Roma Government Complex (former Roma State School) is located on a rectangular block bounded by Wyndham, Bungil and Arthur Streets and two vacant allotments. It is a substantial stuccoed brickwork building, influenced by Interwar Mediterranean style. It faces north toward Bungil Street and is aligned with that street.

Roma Government Complex is a three storeyed building with a centrally located main entrance in a range that breaks forward one bay. The main entrance door is recessed into an arched opening, enriched with an archivolt and keystone, and flanked by two wrought iron bracketed lanterns. The contrasting colour of the basement level accentuates openings and entrance features on the ground and first floor. The split symmetrical stairwell finished with an open porch at main entrance level has simple wrought iron balastrading. A large square opening provides the central entrance to the basement level and is located beneath the entrance porch. It has archivolt and keystone patterns to match the main entrance.

All three storeys have simple openings along the verandahs, facing the street. The ground floor, carries semi circular arches in contrast to the squared openings on the basement and first floor levels. Stair halls at each end of the building maximise the size of the major elevation to Bungil Street. On the basement level, symmetrical projecting door cases crowned with plain shields provide entrance to the stair halls.

The roof, clad with asbestos cement tiles, is pitched and hipped except for the central range which terminates in a gable/pediment at both south and north elevations. The front gable is marked ROMA STATE SCHOOL with the date of construction, 1937, in the gable of the rear of the building.

The building has relatively understated decorative features and fenestration patterns The main entrance is flanked by two grouped banks of casement windows crowned with a semi circular fanlight window. The light gently textured surface contrasts with the dark coloured timber windows located in the central range, the stair halls and the southern elevation. At the rear of the building eleven banks of four casements with fanlights are symmetrically placed on the ground and first floor. Identical grouped casement windows are located on the east and western face of the building.

The verandahs are floored with polished concrete and double hung sash windows line this space. Each floor has three entrance doors to the office spaces. The offices are open plan, with fluorescent lights and a centrally located air conditioning duct. At the western end of the ground floor office area, are two offices which these located on a raised platform, separating them from the main office area.

Bottle trees with small cairns and plaques, part of the Roma Avenue of Heroes, are located on the Bungil and Wyndham Streets footpaths. The front lawn area has six mature palm trees which are sympathetic with the architectural style of the building.

== Heritage listing ==
Roma Government Complex was listed on the Queensland Heritage Register on 4 September 1998 having satisfied the following criteria.

The place is important in demonstrating the evolution or pattern of Queensland's history.

Roma Government Complex, formerly Roma State School, is significant as a substantial stuccoed brick building that reflects regional prosperity of Roma as a pastoral service town. The impressive form of the Roma Government Complex is indicative of the relevant importance of Roma in relation to other towns in south western Queensland.

The place is important in demonstrating the principal characteristics of a particular class of cultural places.

The Roma Government Complex is an excellent regional example of a late Interwar school building, built as a part of the state government's depression initiatives under the Unemployment Relief Scheme. It is a good example of Queensland Public Works school building design and as such demonstrates the principal characteristics of a particular class of cultural place.

The place is important because of its aesthetic significance.

The influence of Interwar Mediterranean style architecture and detailing creates an important aesthetic landmark in the town of Roma.

The place has a strong or special association with a particular community or cultural group for social, cultural or spiritual reasons.

As the former Roma State School, the building has a significant association with almost 50 years of primary school education for the Roma community since 1937.
