= Hospital Hill fire =

1908 fire

The Hospital Hill Fire was a fire at an oil drilling rig that took place on 27 October 1908 at Hospital Hill, about half a mile from the town of Roma, Queensland, Australia. It took 45 days to put out the fire.

== Events ==
On 27 October 1908 oil exploration drilling continued at the Mineral Oil Company's No.2 bore. Just after 9am, whilst drilling at a depth of 1,128 metres below ground, water started coming up from the borehead. The presence of bubbles in the water showed that gas was present. Within a few minutes, "there was a shattering roar and a terrible volume of gas burst from the hole; a dark vapour billowed around the spouting gas".

There was immediate concern that the gas would ignite from the fire under the boiler which was about 20 yards away. Mr Taylor, the manager of the rig, refused to endanger the lives of his men by attempting to extinguish the fire and ordered his workers to retreat. Then at 9:15am the gas inevitably ignited into a huge column of flame. The explosion was described as being like "the discharge of a cannon" and could be heard in town (half-a-mile away).

Newspaper articles reported the fire to have been between 40–50 feet (12–15 metres) high. It generated so much heat it was impossible to stand within 200 feet (61 metres) of the flame. Grass in a paddock over 90 metres away was scorched. The expensive drilling equipment over the borehead was destroyed by the intense heat. The derrick "crumbled up like a piece of tissue paper" in the flames.

At night, the flames at the bore lit up the surrounding area, with the glow seen up to 60 kilometres away. In 2008 Roma Regional Council's Deputy Mayor, Councillor Tom Hartley reminisced that he remembered his grandfather saying you could read a newspaper at night from up to 6–7 miles away because of the gas fire on Hospital Hill.

Although the fire at the borehead was not a direct threat to the town of Roma, there was a fear that a nearby gasometer, which stored the town's supply of gas, would ignite. When gasometers are full, excess gas must be allowed to escape as a safety measure. The Roma gasometer was full and the excess gas was venting only 250 feet from the fire. If the venting gas came into contact with the flames it would have ignited and caused the entire gasometer to explode. Decisive action was needed to avoid an explosion which would have caused inestimable damage the town. Roma's Mayor, Alderman Care, ordered that the excess gas from the gasometer be pumped into the town mains, and allowed to escape in Arthur Street.

The gas fire continued to burn for 45 days. The Brisbane Courier reported that the resumption of boring had begun on or about 15 December. News of this sensation spread throughout Australia and caused a tourism boom in Roma, as people came far and wide to marvel at the fire, to see this "Wonderful Outburst of Nature". One report states that visitors came from as far away as New Zealand. Roma Town Council asked the Railway Department to run special excursion trains. An article published in The Western Star suggests there was a bit of controversy, when over 250 people from Charleville (269 Kilometres W of Roma) wanted to purchase excursion tickets to Roma. Many thought the tickets would cost between 12 shillings and six pence to 15 shillings, but were "disappointed" to find out they were £1.

== Extinguishing ==
There were several aborted attempts to extinguish the flames. Eventual success was thanks to Mr Schooley, Manager of the Intercolonial Boring Company. Mr Schooley designed a special iron hood, approximately 8 feet (2.4 metres) tall and 6 feet square (1.8 metres), with a tall chimney at the top and a pipe at the side both fitted with valves, and a flange around the bottom. The hood was built in Brisbane then transported to Roma. The hood was lifted over the bore head on cables then lowered into position. The flange was covered with dirt and rocks to prevent gas escaping and oxygen entering at the bottom of the hood. The valves in the chimney and pipe were then slowly closed, starving the fire of oxygen until it was extinguished. The whole operation took several hours and was conducted during a series of thunderstorms.

== Gallery ==
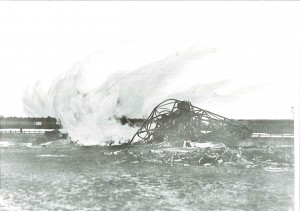
Image of the fire that burnt for 45 days

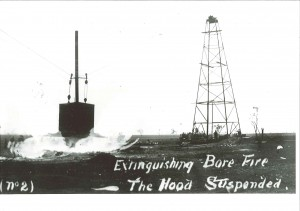
Extinguishing the fire using "Mr Schooley's hood"

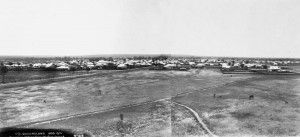
View of Roma taken from Hospital Hill, 1899
