= Romavilla Winery =

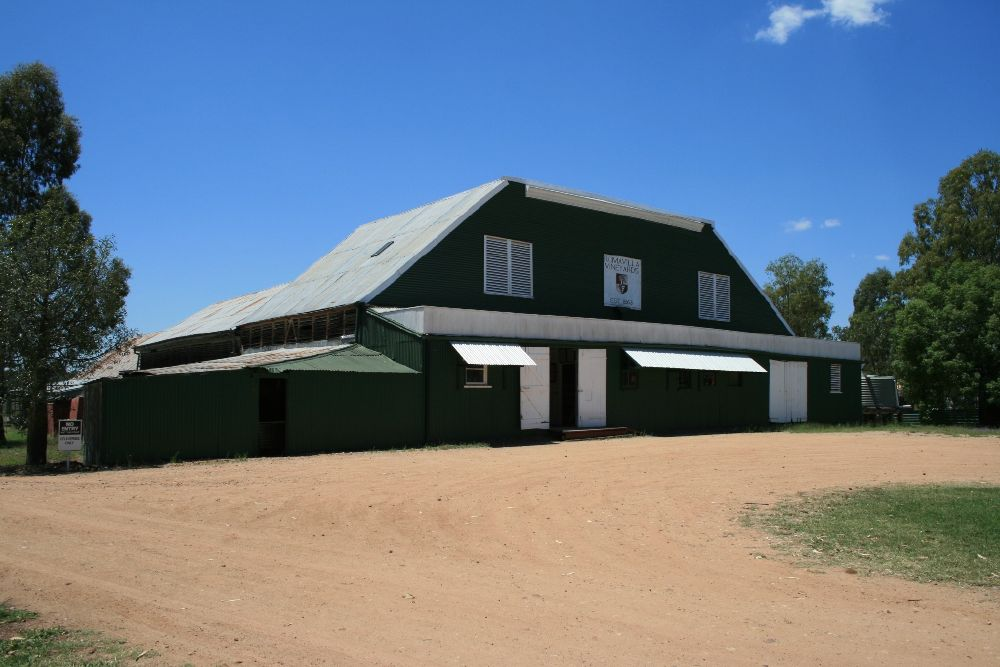
- Romavilla Winery main shed, 2008

- Location within Queensland Location within Australia
- 26.557°S 148.7866°E
- Location: 77 Northern Road, Roma, Maranoa Region, Queensland, Australia

History
- Design period: 1870s–1890s (late 19th century)
- Built: 1877–1878

Queensland Heritage Register
- Official name: Romavilla Winery
- Type: state heritage (built)
- Designated: 14 August 2008
- Reference no.: 601767
- Significant period: 1870s
- Significant components: shed/s, cellar

Romavilla Winery is a heritage-listed winery at 77 Northern Road, Roma, Maranoa Region, Queensland, Australia. It was built from 1877 to 1878. It was added to the Queensland Heritage Register on 14 August 2008. It closed in 2012, when the owners retired. The historic building was mostly destroyed in a catastrophic fire on 22 June 2023.

== History ==
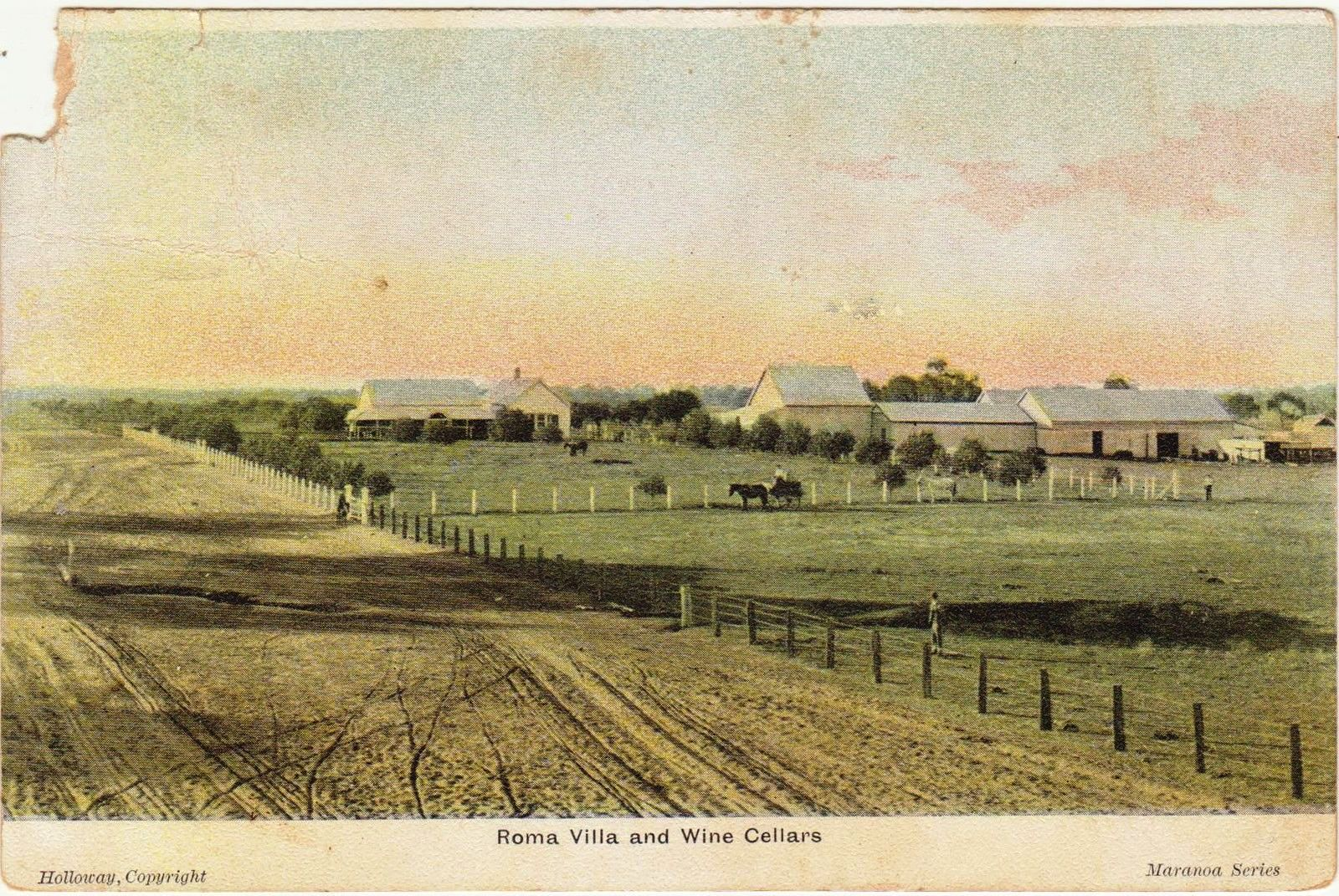
Romavilla Winery, circa 1910

Romavilla Vineyards, on the outskirts of Roma in the Maranoa district of south western Queensland, was established in 1866 by Samuel Symons Bassett. It dominated wine-production in the Roma district and later in Queensland for many decades and continues to manufacture commercial wines. The earliest section of the present winery buildings was constructed in 1877–1878.

Grapes were grown successfully on the head stations of pastoral properties in the area in the 1850s, during the first wave of European settlement, but Romavilla produced the earliest commercial wine in the Maranoa in the 1860s and was among the earliest of Queensland's commercial wine producers. At the peak of viticulture in the Roma district in the late nineteenth century there were 50 local vineyards, the majority of which had been established in the 1870s and 1880s. Most of the grapes grown were for table fruit, but a small wine-producing industry also emerged at this time. The principal vignerons in the district included SS Bassett, John Robertson (manager of Mount Abundance Station), William Tune, James Spencer, Alexandre Robinson, and the Tardent brothers (Henri, Alexis and Emile, from the late 1880s). Grape growing and wine producing remained important local industries well into the twentieth century, with Roma being described in about 1920 as being surrounded by "a magnificent fruit and wine growing district".

Bassett, born in Cornwall in 1840, arrived in Sydney in 1856 and worked on his uncle's Hunter Valley property for some years. From 1860 he managed Euthulla Station in the Maranoa for his uncle and cousin, until in 1866 he purchased from the Crown nearly 270 acres (109 hectares) of recently surveyed agricultural land just outside the town of Roma. Here he established Romavilla Vineyards, with vine cuttings brought in by bullock dray from Toowoomba. In 1869 he diversified his interests with the establishment in Roma of a general store and a depot for wines sales.

In about 1870 Bassett built a house at Romavilla and in 1871 married Isabella Cameron of Brisbane. At Romavilla they raised a large family, with three daughters and six sons surviving to adulthood.

Bassett had no formal training either in grape-growing or wine-making, and learnt largely by trial and error. By 1881 he was employing a manager to run the winery, while he (and later his sons also) travelled throughout Queensland to promote Romavilla wine. By 1888 Bassett had 55 acres under vines, from which he was producing 7,000 gallons of wine per annum, as well as table grapes for the local and Brisbane markets. The Romavilla cellar was capable of holding 30,000 gallons of wine, and Bassett usually kept 20,000 in stock.

Like many of Queensland's early wine producers, Bassett's first cellar at Romavilla was above ground. That structure no longer exists. The earliest section of the present large winery building at Romavilla was constructed in 1877–1878, reportedly of cypress and imported Oregon pine, and was extended several times in later years. It accommodated the whole process of wine making, from crushing, to fermentation in vats, to maturing in barrels, to bottling, and incorporated a large underground cellar. In late 1888 the cellar was described as being partly above and partly below ground, "built of corrugated iron in 7 feet 6 inch lengths, with a space of 18 inches filled in with battens to the wall-plate, and covered with corrugated iron". The section of the cellar that lay partly underground measured 36 by 40 feet (11 by 12 m); attached to the end of this was a similarly constructed cellar building, all above ground, about 50 by 24 feet (15.2 by 7.3 m). There was no attempt to maintain a regular cellar temperature in this structure.

During the 1880s Bassett's reputation as a maker of good wines was established when Romavilla won its first prize for wine in 1886. The winery sustained a list of impressive prizes, including four first prizes out of eight at the 1900 Queensland Exhibition, nine first prizes out of ten at the 1901 Exhibition, and medals at international competitions in continental Europe. By the late 1960s, the winery had won over 650 certificates and medals in Australia and internationally.

Romavilla underwent considerable expansion during the last decade of the nineteenth century and in 1898 Samuel Bassett sent one of his sons, William Augustus, to learn wine-making from Leo Buring in South Australia.

By 1903 the property comprised 500 acres (202 hectares), mostly of light and dark sandy loam, with 170,000 vines planted. Much of this was under irrigation, with two recently erected irrigation plants on the estate. The winery building included an immense cellar, which stored up to 50,000 gallons of wine at a time. Adjacent to the cellar was a "well-equipped plant, with the latest appliances for wine-making", including cooling coils on the vats to reduce heat during fermentation. Romavilla was among the first wineries in Australia to use cooling during fermentation.

In August 1904 title to the property passed from Samuel Symons Bassett to The Romavilla Vineyards Limited (The Romavilla Vineyards Pty Limited from 1942). Following his death in late 1912, Bassett's sons expanded the enterprise into the largest wine-producing firm in Queensland. In 1916 the annual output was estimated at 31,000 gallons and the cellar holdings at 100,000 gallons. By 1923 Romavilla was supplying products to individuals and hotels (especially) all over Queensland. Romavilla fortified wines - such as port, sherry and madeira - were particularly popular and for a considerable period Romavilla distilled its own spirits for fortifying wine. By the 1930s the firm was supplying to wine saloons throughout the State; Queensland Government Railways stocked Romavilla port in its refreshment rooms; and Romavilla altar wine was popular in Catholic churches. By 1967 Romavilla Vineyards was the sole remaining commercial winery in Queensland, producing 20,000–30,000 gallons annually, until the emergence of a boutique wine-making industry in the Stanthorpe district of southern Queensland in the 1970s.

Following WA Bassett's death in the early 1970s the winery passed out of the Bassett family, but its historic involvement was perpetuated when the name of the enterprise was changed in 1977 to Bassetts Romavilla Winery Pty Ltd. New owners installed modern equipment within the nineteenth century structures but retained much of the earlier technology, which is now of considerable historical interest and a tourist attraction. Documentation has been preserved, including early award certificates and a letter from Prime Minister William Hughes, a former worker at Romavilla, who wrote recalling those days following a gift of wine from the vineyard.

The c. 1870 residence was destroyed by a severe storm in 1984.

In March 2012, owners David and Joy Wall announced they were retiring and would sell the winery. In 2013, new owners Katarzyna Group announced they would build a new bar and function room as well as accommodation units.

The historic building was mostly destroyed in a catastrophic fire on 22 June 2023.

== Description ==
Approximately two kilometres north of the township of Roma in western Queensland, Romavilla Winery stands prominently to Northern Road, the main road north out of Roma travelling to the Carnarvon Gorge and beyond. The winery and vineyards are on the flood plain of Bungil Creek which runs down from the hills around Injune to the north. Bounded by Northern Road to the west, Bassett Lane to the north, a neighbouring property to the east and Edna Street and the adjacent caravan park to the south, the winery complex comprises a number of structures. Those considered to be of heritage significance are winery office, winery shed and distillery shed. A display vineyard occupies part of the front yard. A number of hoardings, including one for Bassett Romavilla Winery, stand along the front fence line.

=== Driveway and display vineyard ===
The winery shed is approached along a graveled driveway from the front entrance gate. A display vineyard stands to the south of the driveway adjacent to the small low-set timber-framed and clad winery office.

=== Winery Office ===
A small rectangular timber-framed building standing on low timber stumps and sheltered by a hipped roof clad with corrugated iron, the office building stands west of the winery shed. The projecting gable roofed entrance porch opens into a narrow room running the width of the building. Two offices with a connecting doorway open onto this space. The building is clad with chamferboards and lined with fibrous cement sheeting with batten cover strips. The narrow front room is lit by rectangular casements windows to all three sides and banks of casements windows light the offices.

=== Winery shed ===
The winery shed is a large, timber-framed building clad with timber and corrugated iron. Sheltered by a series of high gabled roofs supported by king post trusses, the winery building is constructed as linked buildings on three levels stepping down the gradient of a slightly sloping site. The small extension at the front of the building is used for sales and wine tasting and together with the adjacent barrel storage area is built over a cellar used for long term wine storage. The centre section accommodates racked barrels and the pressing equipment, storage vats and bottling machinery stand towards the rear of the building.

The front elevation is clad with corrugated metal sheeting and the former tall rectangular parapet is now truncated to follow the outer roof lines of the twin gables behind. The single storey extension running across the front of the building is sheltered by a skillion roof which is screened by a low corrugated iron parapet. The metal sheet cladding extends down into the soil that has been piled up against the front of the building. The extension accommodates two entrances, both housing pairs of ledged and braced timber doors. One opens into the front lobby, the other into the front barrel storage area. Romavilla Vineyards signage is fixed to the upper centre of the elevation, flanked by pairs of fixed timber louvred windows.

The north, east and south sides of the shed are clad with corrugated iron and a continuous band of fixed timber louvres runs along the upper north and south walls. The north side has a number of lean-to extensions - an open storage area to the west end, small lean-to enclosed sheds flanking the entrance in the rear end of the shed and a skillion roof open storage space to the east end. This wraps around to the eastern side where it terminates in an enclosed shed to the south end. A number of concrete slabs, drains and structures, including timber and corrugated iron sheds and concrete water tanks, stand south of the shed.

From the front entrance lobby, the sales office opens to the left, the tasting area to the right and the front portion of the shed is directly ahead. An unlined, high volume space with fixed timber louvres along the upper north and south walls, the front portion of the shed is wider than the other parts of the shed and has a timber floor supported by timber posts from the cellar below. It accommodates barrel storage, a small open office cubicle and the excise inspector's office. The office cubicle sits on a timber platform projecting into the middle shed area where it is supported by timber stumps. The office accommodates narrow timber benches with cupboards below, a small table and a bench seat. A number of framed certificates and awards are propped around the office. A timber framed podium clad with vertical tongue and groove boards, the elevated excise inspector's office, stands to the north and is approached by a set of timber stairs. It projects into the middle shed area and commands views across the whole shed.

The middle and rear portions of the shed have concrete floors and a number of drains run through these areas. The barrel storage area in the middle portion of the shed is organised around a grid of walkways and concrete upstands accommodating concrete plinths on which the barrels stand.

The rear of the shed accommodates a range of early and modern equipment. Early equipment including the crusher, pressing equipment, in-ground concrete blending and storage tanks are considered to be significant. Pairs of large timber doors open from this area of the shed to the east and south. Marks in the concrete floor indicate where earlier concrete fermentation tanks stood. A number of these tanks now stand inverted in the yard to the north of the shed. Drive wheels and other elements of the earlier power generation system remain to the south wall of the shed. Two small in-ground concrete blending tanks stand to the middle of this area of the shed. Each tank has a low, rounded, concrete upstand supporting concrete posts to each corner linked by hollow metal rails. A large three chamber concrete storage tank runs along the north side of the shed. The tank has deep in- ground chambers with concrete walls rising about 1.7 metres (5 ft 7 in) above shed floor level. The flat concrete top has a number of lidded access hatches. A cut-away portion in the side of the tank allows a view into the middle chamber. Modern equipment including stainless steel storage vats, bottling equipment and cold storage is not considered to be significant.

The cellar is dug into the ground below the front part of the shed and is accessed from the middle barrel storage area by a set of concrete stairs descending below the excise officer's podium. A narrow corrugated iron sheeted chute incorporating a timber ladder drops into the cellar on the south side of the projecting front office cubicle. Rows of rough unsawn posts support timber beams carrying the framing for the floor above. Barrels rest on timber racks standing on the part concrete, part dirt floor. Perimeter retaining walls to the north and south are timber framed and lined with corrugated iron and those to the east and west are constructed of concrete and timber. A set of timber stairs to east side climbs to the tasting area above.

=== Distillery ===
The distillery shed is a rectangular timber framed corrugated iron clad building sheltered by a corrugated iron clad gabled roof. To the south, a small rectangular roof sheltering the distillery apparatus projects above the main roof. Both gable ends of the shed are infilled with horizontal timber weatherboards and fixed timber louvres run around the upper parts of the walls. The timber frame is a combination of sawn studs, beams and battens and adzed and unsawn timber posts. A skillion roof projects from the south side of the building sheltering the firebox hatch.

The distillery shed accommodates a storage room over a cellar to the north and a distillery room to the south. A braced and ledged timber door in the middle of the north elevation opens into the unlined storage area which has a timber floor. Fixed timber louvers run around the upper west, north and east walls. A metal grate stands immediately inside the entrance. A door on the east side opens into the still room where from the northwest corner a set of steep timber stairs to the cellar. The cellar has timber framed walls clad with corrugated iron set into the earth surrounding it.

In the distillery room, two copper boilers - one higher than the other - are set into a stepped rectangular brick frame which houses a firebox and stands against the south wall onto the dirt floor. A brick chimney extends out of the firebox and through the roof at the southwest corner. The firebox is accessed through a metal hatch on the external south wall. The hatch bears the maker's nameplate - Harvey & Son Engineers Brisbane. Each boiler is fitted with a tall copper cylinder standing perpendicularly over it, the whole crowned by a horizontal chamber just below the ceiling. The boilers are connected by a copper inverted U-tube and a number of cocks and tubes are worked within the apparatus which is held within a timber frame. A small timber ladder provides access to the upper part. To the front of the apparatus a cock regulates tubes that connect to the cellar below, running within a timber frame in the middle of the dirt floor.

=== Equipment ===
Equipment associated with earlier wine making practices has been retained and is displayed for visitors. This includes basket presses in the tasting/sales area and concrete fermentation tanks in the yard.

== Heritage listing ==
Romavilla Winery was listed on the Queensland Heritage Register on 14 August 2008 having satisfied the following criteria.

The place is important in demonstrating the evolution or pattern of Queensland's history.

Romavilla Winery demonstrates a continuity of use from the 1870s and is important for its association with early attempts to establish a Queensland wine-making industry. Immigrant agriculturalists experimented with grape-growing in Queensland wherever soil and climate were considered suitable, and for many decades in the late nineteenth and early twentieth centuries the Roma area was one of the principal grape-producing districts in Queensland. Although wine production is no longer a significant industry in the Maranoa, viticulture was one of the earliest commercial agricultural activities in the Roma district and wine production one its earliest agriculture-based industries. The first commercial wine in this district was produced at Romavilla Vineyards in the 1860s.

The place demonstrates rare, uncommon or endangered aspects of Queensland's cultural heritage.

As a rare surviving early winery in Queensland that has retained much of its building and some early equipment, the place is important in demonstrating aspects of Queensland's manufacturing history that are no longer common.

The place has potential to yield information that will contribute to an understanding of Queensland's history.

With further investigation the surviving early fabric, Romavilla Winery, informed by the firm's early business records (held in the State Library of Queensland), has the potential to yield information that will contribute to an understanding of Queensland's early wine-producing industry.

The place is important in demonstrating the principal characteristics of a particular class of cultural places.

Romavilla Winery is the oldest still-operating winery in Queensland, and retains much fabric important in illustrating the principal characteristics of a late nineteenth and early twentieth century winery.
