= Roma, Queensland =

Roma
- Town
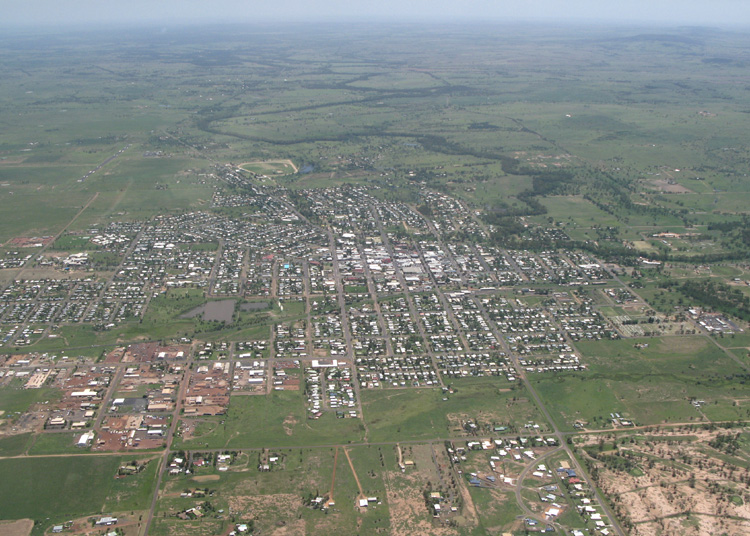
- Aerial view of Roma

- Interactive map of Roma
- Coordinates: 26.5733°S 148.7869°E
- Country: Australia
- State: Queensland
- LGA: Maranoa Region
- Location: 268 km (167 mi) E of Charleville; 351 km (218 mi) WNW of Toowoomba; 479 km (298 mi) WNW of Brisbane
- Established: 1867

Government
  - State electorate: Warrego
  - Federal division: Maranoa

Area
  - Total: 78.1 km^{2} (30.2 sq mi)
- Elevation: 299.4 m (982 ft)

Population
  - Total: 6,838 (2021 census)
  - Density: 87.55/km^{2} (226.76/sq mi)
- Time zone: UTC+10:00 (AEST)
- Postcode: 4455
- County: Waldegrave
- Mean max temp: 27.7 °C (81.9 °F)
- Mean min temp: 12.7 °C (54.9 °F)
- Annual rainfall: 591.5 mm (23.29 in)
Localities around Roma
Euthulla	Orange Hill	Euthulla
Dargal Road	Roma	Euthulla
Bungil	Bungil	Tingun

Roma is a rural town and locality in the Maranoa Region, Queensland, Australia. It is the administrative centre of the Maranoa Region. The town was incorporated in 1867 and is named after Lady Diamantina Bowen (née di Roma), the wife of Sir George Bowen, the Governor of Queensland at the time. In the 2021 census, the locality of Roma had a population of 6,838 people.

== Geography ==
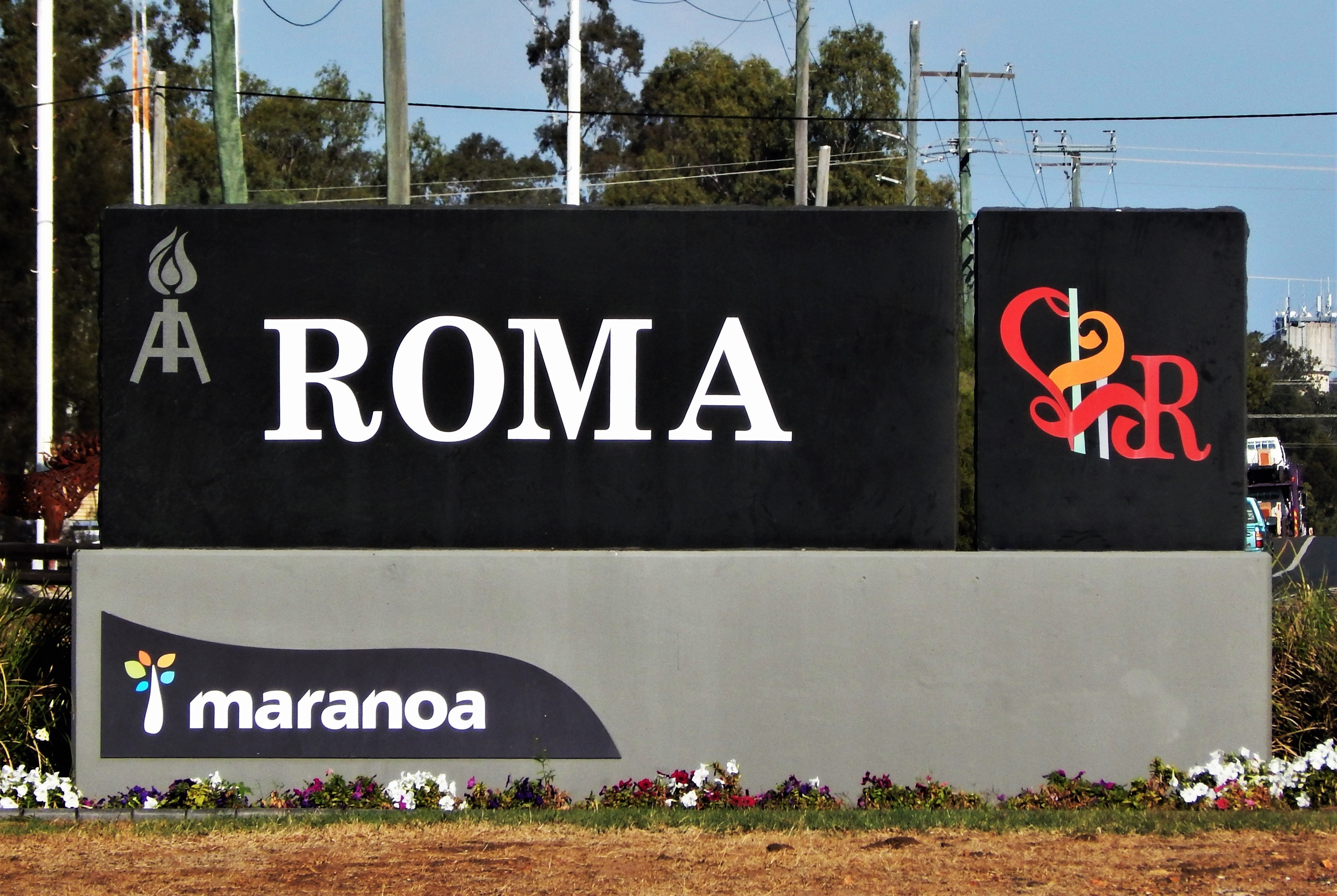
Sign on the Warrego Highway at the eastern entrance to Roma

Roma is in the Maranoa district of South West Queensland. It is situated at the junction of the Warrego and Carnarvon highways. It is also a major town on the Western Railway Line from Toowoomba and Brisbane.

It is the centre of a rich pastoral and wheat-growing district.

== History ==
=== Mandandanji ===
Prior to British colonisation, the Aboriginal peoples of the Mandandanji Nation occupied this region. Mandandanji (also known as Mandandanyi, Mandandanjdji, Kogai) is an Australian Aboriginal language spoken by the Mandandanji people. The Mandandanji language region is within the local government boundaries of the Maranoa Region, particularly Roma, Yuleba and Surat, then east towards Chinchilla and south-west towards Mitchell and St George.

=== British exploration ===
The first documented British explorers to enter the region were Sir Thomas Mitchell and Edmund Kennedy on their 1846 expedition. Mitchell named a nearby hill Mount Abundance due to the rich plains he encountered around what is now Roma. He called these plains the Fitzroy Downs in honour of the newly appointed Governor of New South Wales, Charles Augustus FitzRoy.

Mitchell and Kennedy encountered a community of around 200 Aboriginal people in this vicinity. After initial friendly communication, hostilities arose with Kennedy's men dispersing a group of Mandandanji after they tried to burn down the explorer's encampment.

=== Arrival of British pastoralists and frontier conflict ===
When Mitchell returned to Sydney from his expedition, he encouraged his friend and head colonial government bureaucrat, William Macpherson, to take up land on the Fitzroy Downs. Macpherson's son, Allan Macpherson, subsequently took 20 men and around 10,000 head of sheep and cattle from his property at Keera on the Gwydir River and headed for the Fitzroy Downs. In October 1847, he established the Mount Abundance pastoral station, which covered 400,000 acres from Muckadilla Creek on the west to Bungil Creek on the east. The township of Roma now stands on the part of the station where Macpherson decided to graze his cattle.

In August 1848, James Blyth attempted to establish a sheep station on Bungil Creek but the resident Mandandanji drove him off, spearing Blyth in the leg, killing his stockman and taking 3,000 of his sheep. This incident was the start of a lengthy war between the Aboriginal people of the area and the colonists. In late 1848, Macpherson had several skirmishes with Aboriginal people around Bungil Creek, killing an indeterminate number. By April 1849 the Mandandanji had killed seven of Macpherson's stockmen, and the local Crown Lands Commissioner, John Durbin, with his contingent of mounted Border Police troopers was called in to give armed assistance. Despite this, Macpherson was defeated and forced to abandon his Mount Abundance station in May 1849.

Upon their exit, Macpherson and Durbin requested the government to mobilise the newly formed Native Police force to eliminate Aboriginal resistance in the region. Subsequently, in July 1849, Frederick Walker led his Native Police troopers against the "Fitzroy Downs blacks", shooting many during a large skirmish. In late 1850, the Mandandanji regrouped to attack Paddy McEnroe who had attempted to re-establish the Mount Abundance pastoral station. They killed one of his shepherds, burnt down a hut and took 400 cattle. Roderick Mitchell, the local Crown Lands Commissioner who had replaced Durbin, led a reprisal raid consisting of his police troopers and nearby squatter colonists, which recovered the cattle and killed 13 Aborigines.

In 1851, a large Native Police barracks was established at nearby Wondai Gumbal which housed up to 35 troopers. These troopers under officers George Fulford, James Skelton and Richard Dempster, conducted several patrols of the Mount Abundance area, shooting Aborigines when hostile contact was encountered. In November 1852, Mandandanji resistance on the Fitzroy Downs was finally crushed when Skelton dispersed with "severe means" a large group of Aborigines, killing at least six including Mandandanji leader Possum Murray (Bussamarai).

In 1858, the Mount Abundance pastoral station was sold to Stephen Spencer who was able to peacefully re-occupy the property with his family, 13 stockmen and 1,000 head of cattle. A new Native Police barracks was formed in 1859 on Bungil Creek under Sub-Lieutenant William Morehead which ensured British control of the region.

=== Township of Roma ===
In 1862, the Government of Queensland issued instructions for a town to be created in the Maranoa Region. Surveyors Robert Austin and A.C. Gregory chose a site adjacent to Bungil Creek on Stephen Spencer's Mount Abundance pastoral station. This site became the township of Roma. Initially consisting of nothing more than three public houses, Roma was named after Lady Diamantina Bowen (Contessa Diamantina di Roma), wife of the first Governor of Queensland, George Bowen.

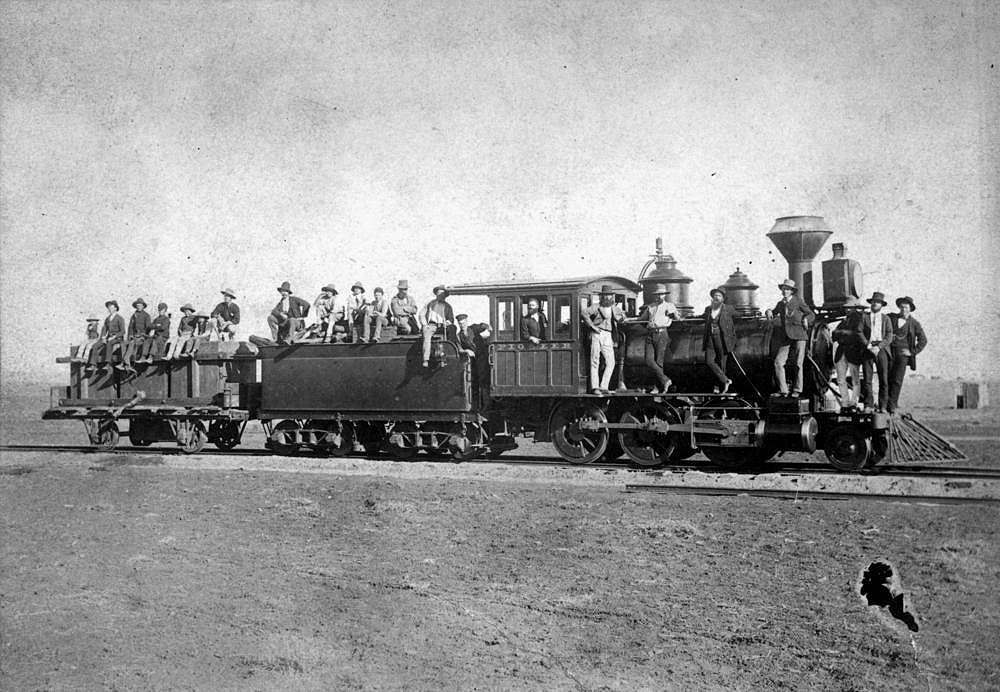
Steam locomotive 'Pioneer' on the Western Railway construction site between Roma and Mitchell, ca. 1885

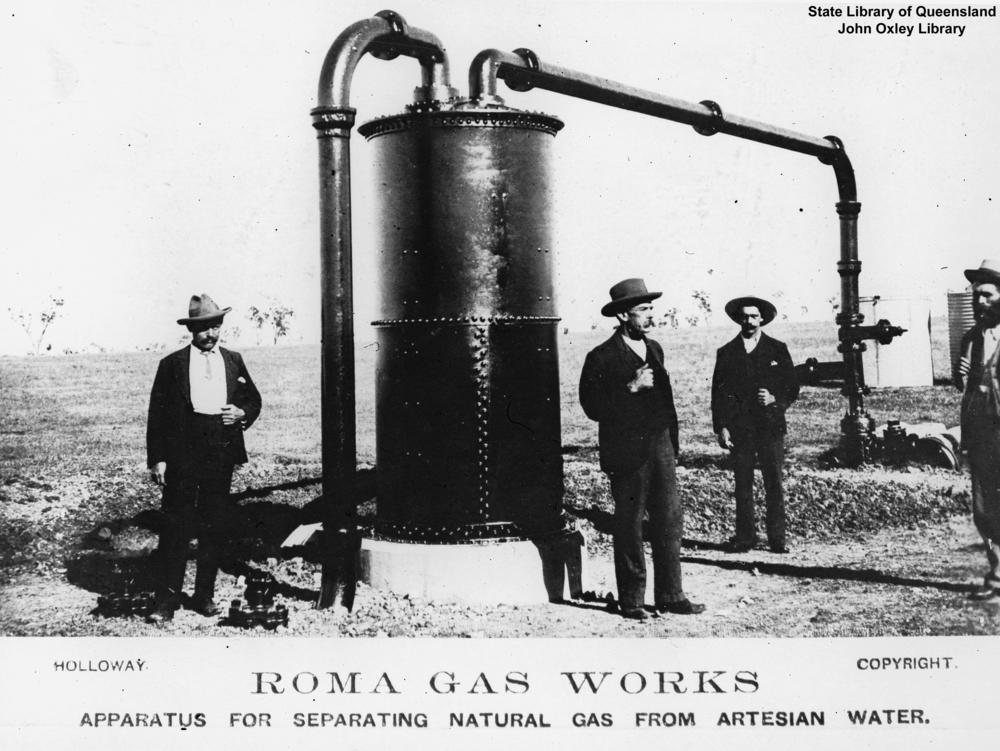
Apparatus for separating natural gas from artesian water at the Roma Gas Works

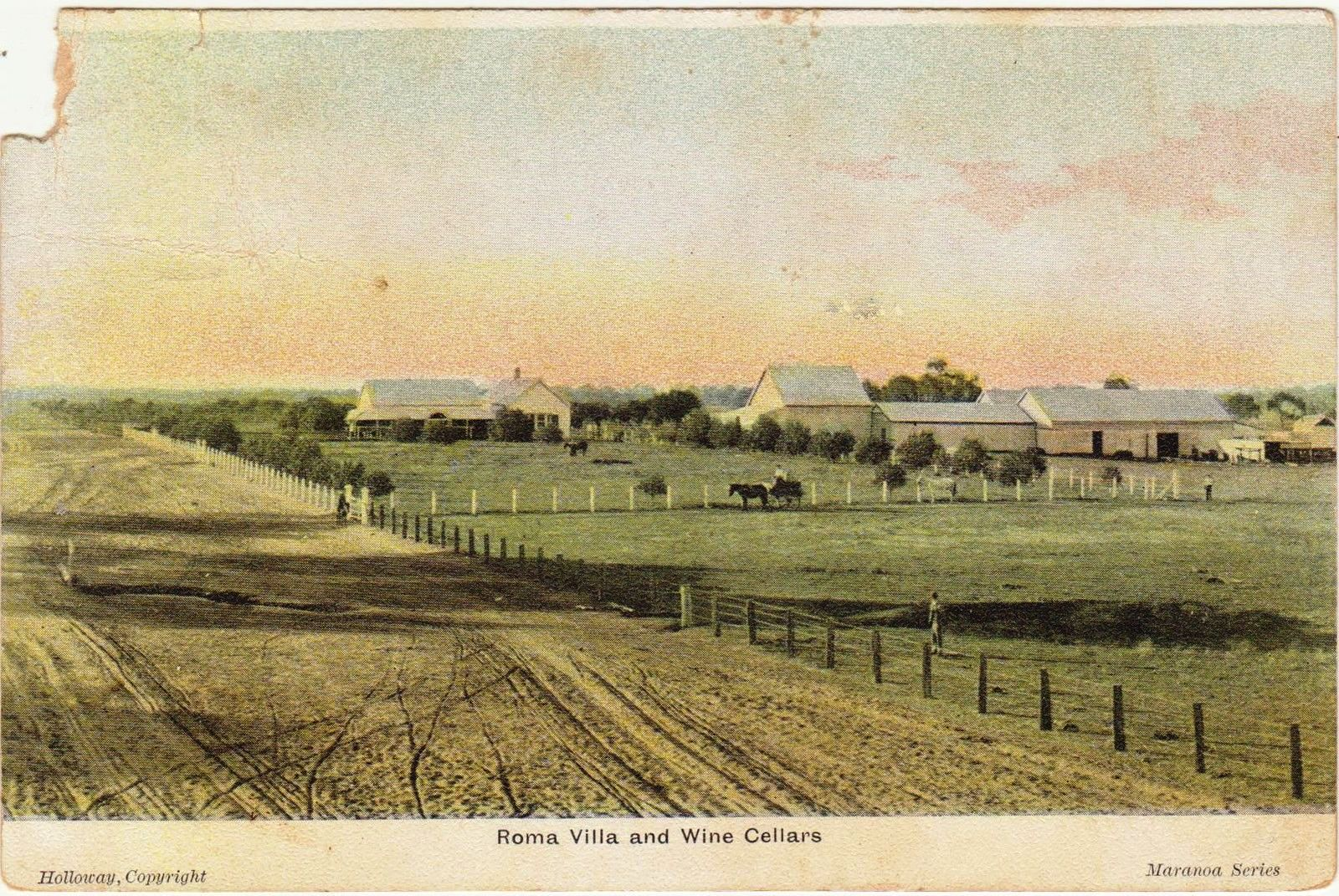
Romavilla Winery founded in 1866 by Samuel Symons Bassett

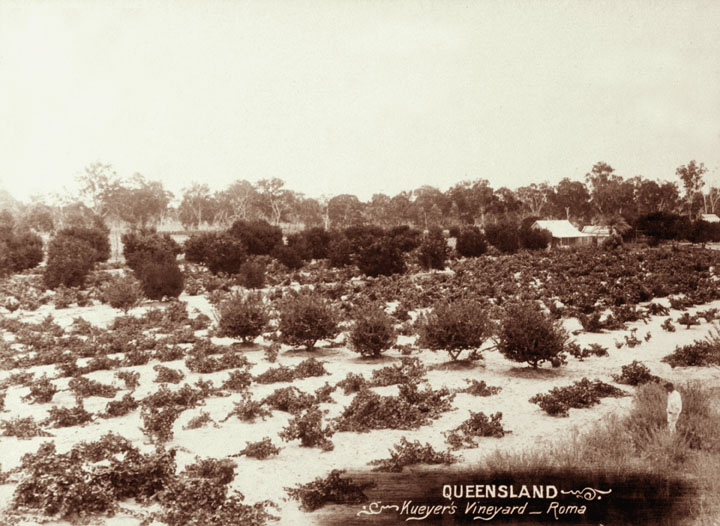
Kueyers vineyard Roma c 1898

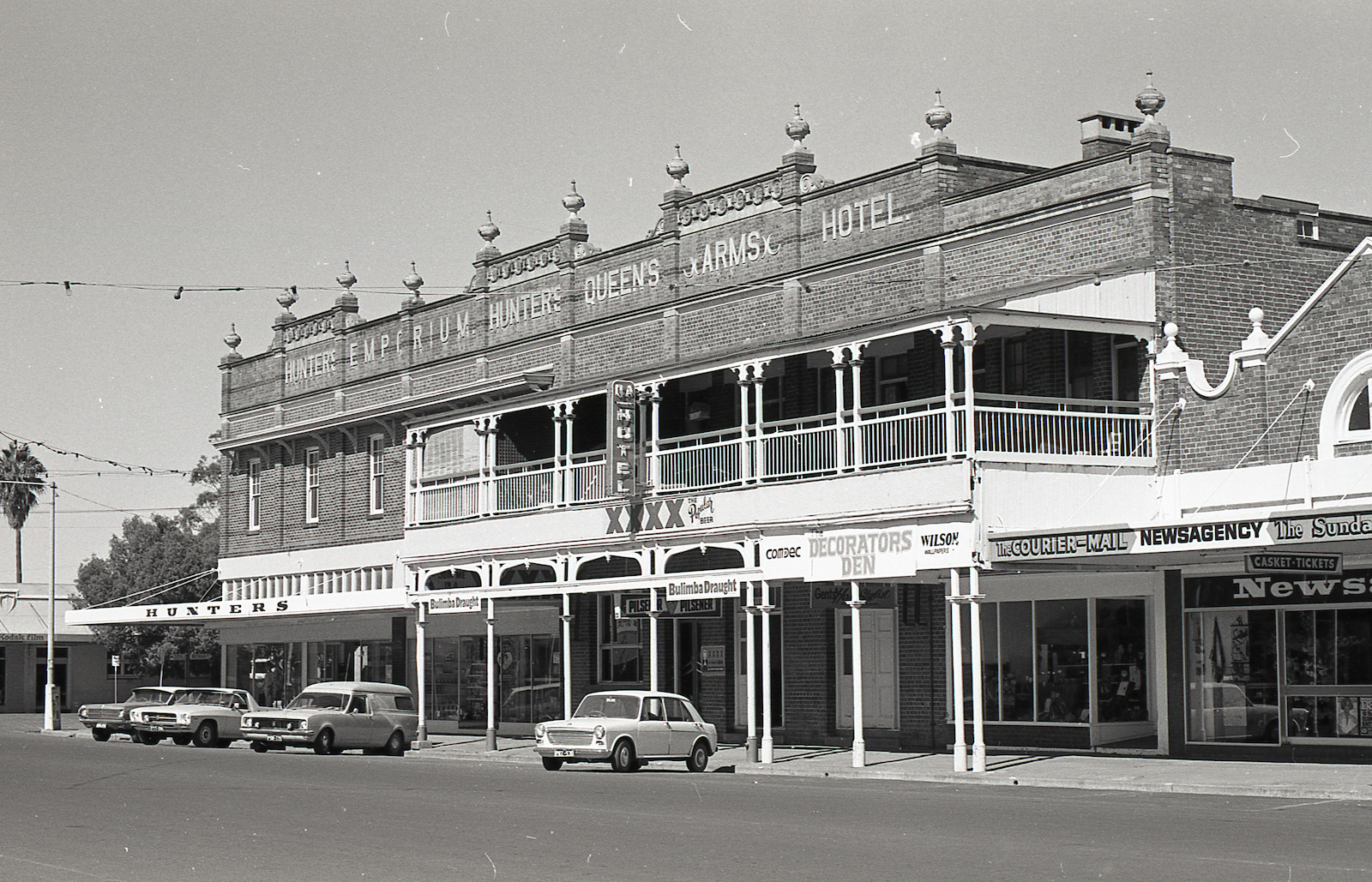
Queens Arms Hotel and Hunters Emporium building in Roma, Queensland 1975

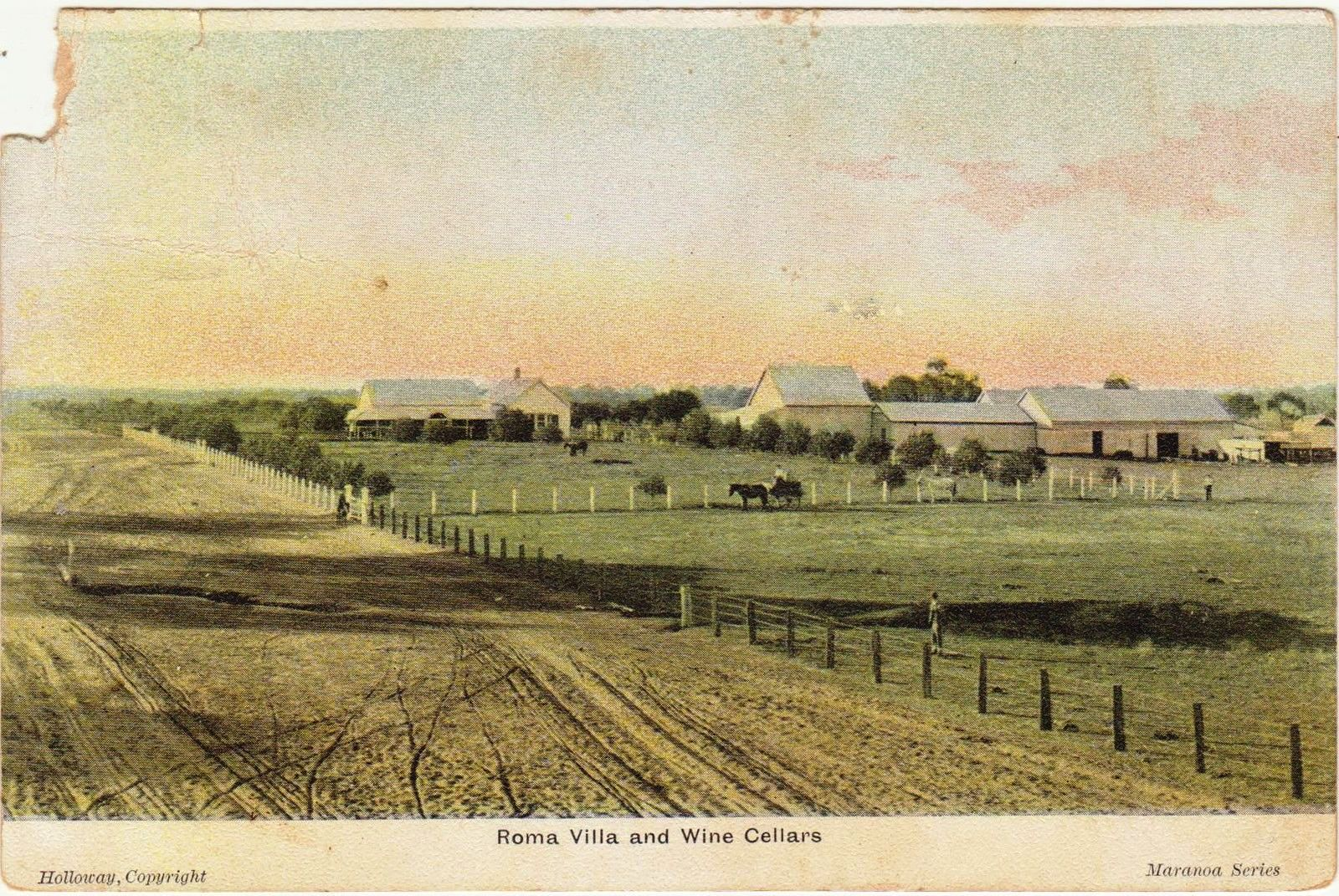
Romavilla Winery founded in 1866 by Samuel Symons Bassett

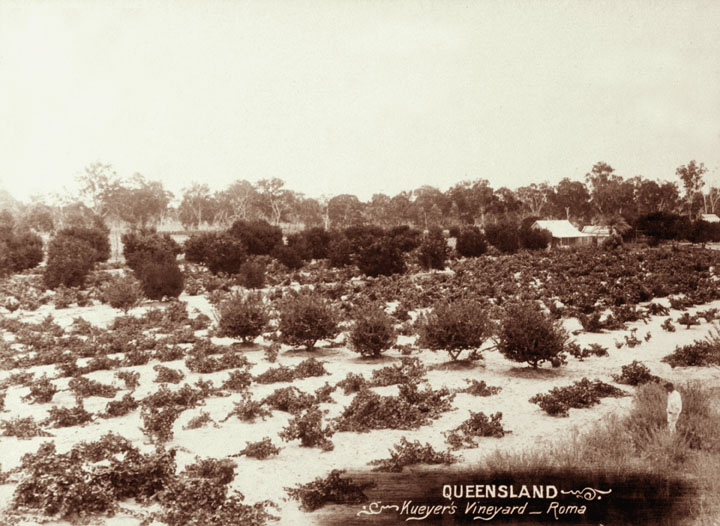
Kueyers vineyard Roma c 1898

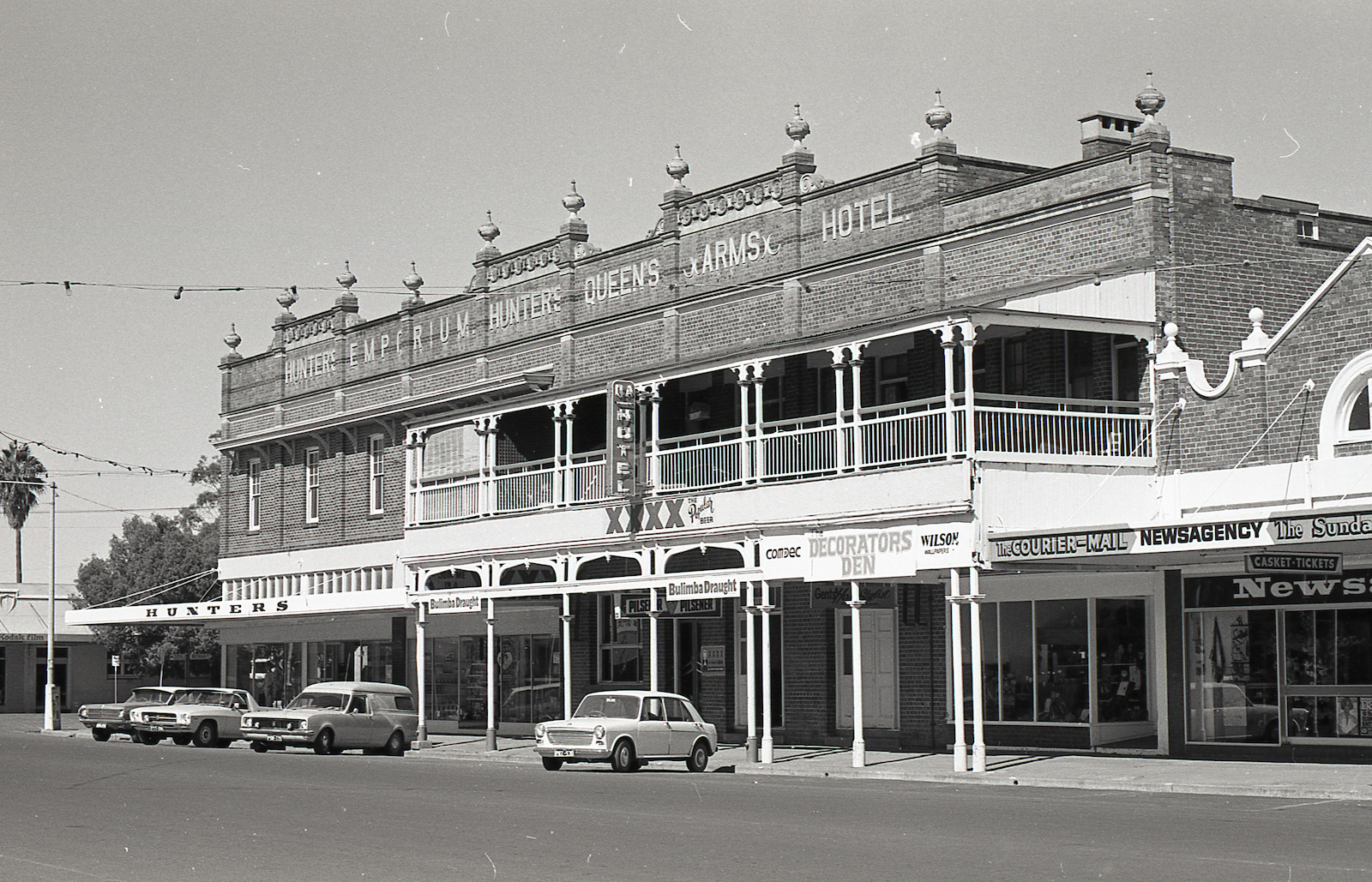
Queens Arms Hotel and Hunters Emporium building in Roma, Queensland 1975

In 1863 Samuel Symons Bassett brought Queensland's vine cuttings to Roma and established the Romavilla Winery in 1866 on Bungil Creek north of Roma.

In 1864, Reverend Adam McIntyre of the Free Church of Scotland commenced services at pastoral stations in the Maranoa district with the intention that he would be established as a permanent minister in Roma. However, on 22 May 1866 he died at Brucedale pastoral station on Bungil Creek south-east of Roma (26.8892°S 148.9312°E), now in Tingun .

Captain Starlight, a cattle rustler, was tried and acquitted in the Roma Courthouse in February 1873.

Roma State School, the first school in Roma, opened on 21 March 1870 and closed on 31 December 1986.

St John's School was established by the Sisters of Mercy in 1881.

Roma was the site of Australia's first oil and gas discoveries.

During World War II, Roma was the location of RAAF No.22 Inland Aircraft Fuel Depot (IAFD), completed in 1942 and closed on 29 August 1944. Usually consisting of 4 tanks, 31 fuel depots were built across Australia for the storage and supply of aircraft fuel for the RAAF and the US Army Air Forces at a total cost of £900,000 ($1,800,000).

Roma Special School opened on 25 January 1982 and closed on 31 December 1995.

In 2004, Roma had a low unemployment rate of 2.9%, which is among the lowest unemployment rates in Australia. 68.5% of the people in the labour force living in Roma were employed full-time, with 21.9% working on a part-time basis.

The Roma State College opened on 1 January 2006 as an amalgamation of Roma Junior School and Roma Middle School, and the addition of a new senior component.

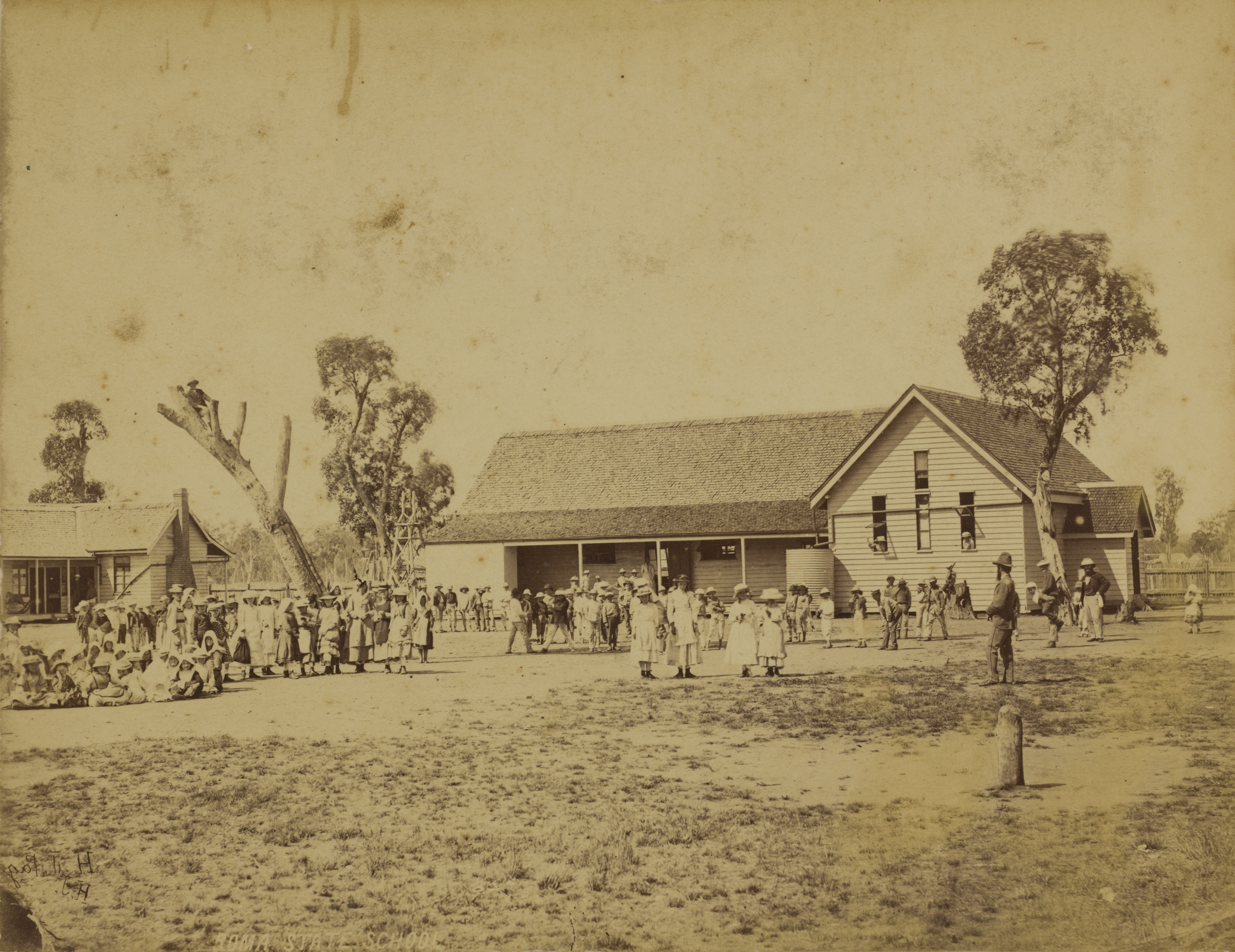
Photograph of Roma State School

In 2010, a Santos project study investigated the possibility of introducing treated CSG produce water into Roma's existing underground aquifer which supplies the town's water needs, including drinking water The Roma Managed Aquifer Recharge Study is the first of its kind in Australia. It is also considered experimental in nature as the risks are largely unknown. The Roma CSG Field pilot trial (Hermitage) Stage 4 is in operation (Completed Q4 2012) and Roma CSG Field (The Bend) Stage 4 operation is due to commence Q3/Q4 2014. The project will allow for the injection of up to 24 ML/d of treated coal seam gas water into the Gubberamunda Sandstone aquifer for up to 20 years. Water bores have been shut down and hence been restarted at nearby Wallumbilla due to methane being detected in the Gubberamunda Sandstone aquifer (2014).

== Demographics ==
In the 2016 census, the locality of Roma had a population of 6,848 people. 78.2% of the people were born in Australia. The next most common countries of birth were the Philippines 2.4%, New Zealand 1.6%, England 1.1%, India 1.1% and South Africa 0.5%. 83.1% of people only spoke English at home. Other languages spoken at home included Tagalog 1.4%, Filipino 0.7%, Punjabi 0.7%, Mandarin 0.4% and Afrikaans 0.2%. The most common responses for religion were Catholic 27.2%, Anglican 21.8%, No Religion 18.4% and Uniting Church 5.3%. The median age stood at 33, below the national average of 38.

In the 2021 census, the locality of Roma had a population of 6,838 people.

== Heritage listings ==
Roma has a number of heritage-listed sites, including:

- State Butchers Shop, 75 Arthur Street
- Roma Government Complex (former Roma State School), 42 Bungil Street
- Hibernian Hall, 38–44 Hawthorne Street
- Roma Court House and Police Buildings, McDowall Street
- Hunter's Emporium, 86 McDowell Street
- Romavilla Winery, 77 Northern Road
- Mount Abundance Homestead, Warrego Highway, Bungeworgorai
- War Memorial and Heroes Avenue, Wyndham Street

== Climate ==
Roma experiences a semi-arid influenced humid subtropical climate (Köppen: Cfa), with very hot, somewhat humid summers and mild, dry winters with regular frosts. Average maxima range from 34.6 °C (94.3 °F) to 20.5 °C (68.9 °F) in July; modified by its position on the far south of the Carnarvon Range 307 metres (1,007 ft) above sea level. Rainfall is moderate to low, averaging 560.9 mm (22.08 in), and peaks in summer due to severe thunderstorms. Although the town is too far inland to be affected by tropical cyclones and monsoonal rain depressions, on 2 March 2010, 132.8 mm (5.23 in) of rain fell, causing significant flooding in the town. Extremes have ranged from 45.8 °C (114.4 °F) on 3 January 2014 to −5.8 °C (21.6 °F) on 10 August 1995. Snow in Roma is extremely rare, with the last known snowfall being at around 5pm on the 13th of July 1960.

Climate data for Roma (26º33'00"S, 148º46'12"E, 307 m AMSL) (1985–2024, extremes 1957–2024)
Month	Jan	Feb	Mar	Apr	May	Jun	Jul	Aug	Sep	Oct	Nov	Dec	Year
Record high °C (°F)	45.8 (114.4)	45.0 (113.0)	42.9 (109.2)	36.7 (98.1)	33.2 (91.8)	32.8 (91.0)	29.7 (85.5)	36.5 (97.7)	40.9 (105.6)	42.2 (108.0)	43.7 (110.7)	45.5 (113.9)	45.8 (114.4)
Mean daily maximum °C (°F)	34.6 (94.3)	33.1 (91.6)	31.7 (89.1)	28.2 (82.8)	23.8 (74.8)	20.6 (69.1)	20.5 (68.9)	22.8 (73.0)	26.8 (80.2)	30.0 (86.0)	32.2 (90.0)	33.6 (92.5)	28.2 (82.7)
Mean daily minimum °C (°F)	21.1 (70.0)	20.1 (68.2)	17.6 (63.7)	12.4 (54.3)	7.7 (45.9)	5.0 (41.0)	3.7 (38.7)	4.8 (40.6)	9.3 (48.7)	13.6 (56.5)	17.1 (62.8)	19.3 (66.7)	12.6 (54.8)
Record low °C (°F)	9.2 (48.6)	9.5 (49.1)	4.3 (39.7)	−0.6 (30.9)	−2.9 (26.8)	−4.8 (23.4)	−5.5 (22.1)	−5.8 (21.6)	−3.5 (25.7)	1.4 (34.5)	4.2 (39.6)	7.8 (46.0)	−5.8 (21.6)
Average precipitation mm (inches)	66.2 (2.61)	86.0 (3.39)	61.3 (2.41)	30.9 (1.22)	31.2 (1.23)	27.4 (1.08)	22.7 (0.89)	21.8 (0.86)	27.0 (1.06)	49.9 (1.96)	60.7 (2.39)	75.3 (2.96)	560.9 (22.08)
Average precipitation days (≥ 1.0 mm)	5.1	6.0	3.9	2.4	3.1	2.8	2.6	2.5	2.9	4.7	5.7	6.5	48.2
Average afternoon relative humidity (%)	34	41	34	33	37	41	38	31	27	28	32	33	34
Average dew point °C (°F)	13.3 (55.9)	14.4 (57.9)	11.4 (52.5)	7.9 (46.2)	6.0 (42.8)	5.1 (41.2)	3.3 (37.9)	1.8 (35.2)	3.3 (37.9)	5.2 (41.4)	8.9 (48.0)	11.4 (52.5)	7.7 (45.8)
Source: Bureau of Meteorology

=== Flooding ===
The town is situated on Bungil Creek, a tributary of the Condamine River. In March 2010, Roma experienced its worst floods in over 100 years. Flooding also occurred in April 2011, a year of record rainfall in Roma. In early February 2012, Roma was devastated by its worst floods in history, eclipsing the level reached in 2010; 444 homes were inundated, twice as many that were flooded in the two previous years.

Having experienced three successive years of flooding, in May 2012, one insurer, Suncorp, announced it would not issue new policies to Roma residents, unless action was taken to mitigate the flood risk in Roma.

== Industry and economy ==
Roma is the central hub of the Maranoa Region.

=== Agriculture ===
The Maranoa's agriculture industry is worth approximately $620 million annually, 64.3% being generated from crops. 58.7% of businesses in the Maranoa are in the agriculture, forestry and fishing sector, which employs 32.7% of the region's workforce. 2005 was a record year for Roma saleyards processing 390,000 head of cattle. Roma is home to the largest store cattle saleyards in the Southern Hemisphere. Saledays are Tuesday (for the big sales) and Thursday (for the fat cattle) Forestry plantations include Hardwood and Cypress Pines. Roma and the Maranoa region is home to Australia's most active native Cypress Pine sawmilling.

=== Oil and Gas ===
Natural gas was found in Roma in 1904. In 1906, natural gas was used for lighting in Roma. The industry has expanded as more reserves were discovered.

Origin Energy's Spring Gully Coal Seam Gas Development is about 80 kilometres (50 mi) north of Roma and its projects include an 87 kilometres (54 mi) gas pipeline to Roma's neighbour town of Wallumbilla to connect with the 434 kilometres (270 mi) Roma to Brisbane Pipeline hub there.

Santos GLNG is developing CSG fields in the district and is undertaking the project on behalf of a joint venture arrangement with Santos Limited, Petroliam Nasional Berhad, TotalEnergies and Korea Gas Corporation. The projects are spatially intensive and include production and monitoring wells, underground gas storage, injection wells, fixed above-ground gas field facilities, water management infrastructure, and above and below-ground gas and water pipelines.

=== Water ===
Bore water for the town is obtained from the Artesian Basin.

== Media ==
ABC Local Radio station that broadcast to the town is ABC Southern Queensland on 105.7 FM.

4ZR is Roma's local radio station, broadcasting on 1476 AM. It is operated by Resonate Broadcasting who also operates 4VL in Charleville and 4LG in Longreach.

Hit 95.1 Maranoa (part of the Southern Cross Austereo – operated Hit Radio Network) is Roma's main FM Radio Station, broadcasting on 95.1 FM.

The Western Star started online only publications on the 26th of June 2020.

Switch FM became is the only locally owned and operated FM broadcaster. Switch FM broadcasts on 95.9 FM, as well as a country music orientated channel broadcasting on 87.8 FM.

== Education ==
Roma State College is a government primary and secondary (Early Childhood to Year 12) school for boys and girls (26.5655°S 148.7781°E). In 2017, the school had an enrolment of 871 students (including students from Wallumbilla, Yuleba, Muckadilla, Amby and Surat) with 86 teachers (76 full-time equivalent) and 59 non-teaching staff (45 full-time equivalent). The college operates from three separate campuses:

- Junior Campus (Early Childhood to Year 2) at 28 Bowen Street (26.5736°S 148.7875°E)
- Middle Campus (Years 3–6) on Cottell Street (26.5655°S 148.7781°E)
- Senior Campus (Years 7–12) on Timbury Street (26.5670°S 148.7792°E)

A special education program (certified through the National Disability Insurance Scheme) embracing the full range of disabilities is available at all three campuses.

St John's School is a Roman Catholic primary and secondary (Preparatory to Year 12) school for boys and girls at Bowen Street (26.5724°S 148.7808°E). In 2017, the school had an enrolment of 697 students with 61 teachers (55 full-time equivalent) and 27 non-teaching staff (19 full-time equivalent).

== Sport ==
Roma is home to a parkrun which has run every Saturday since 2014.

== Amenities ==
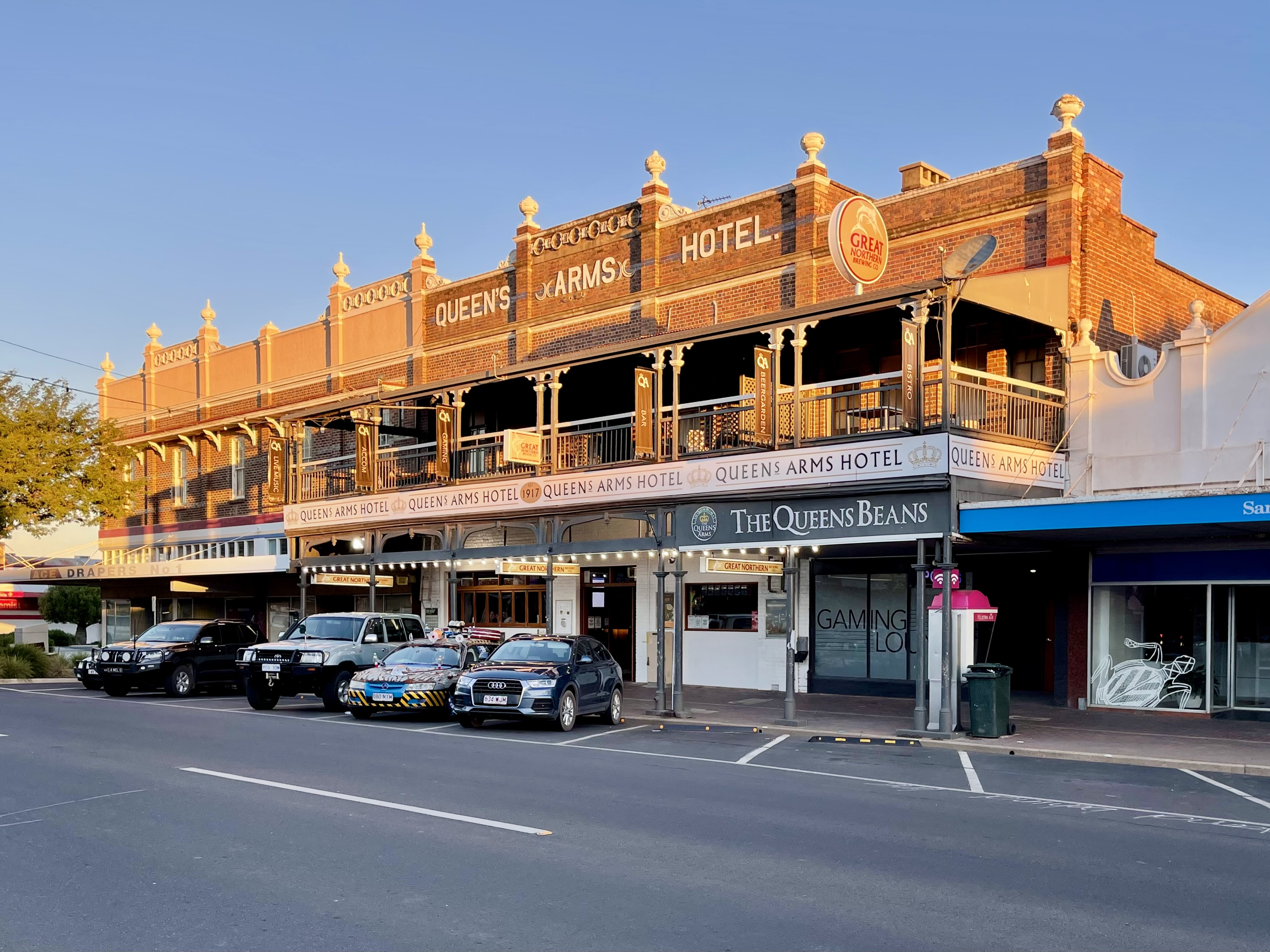
The Queen's Arms Hotel

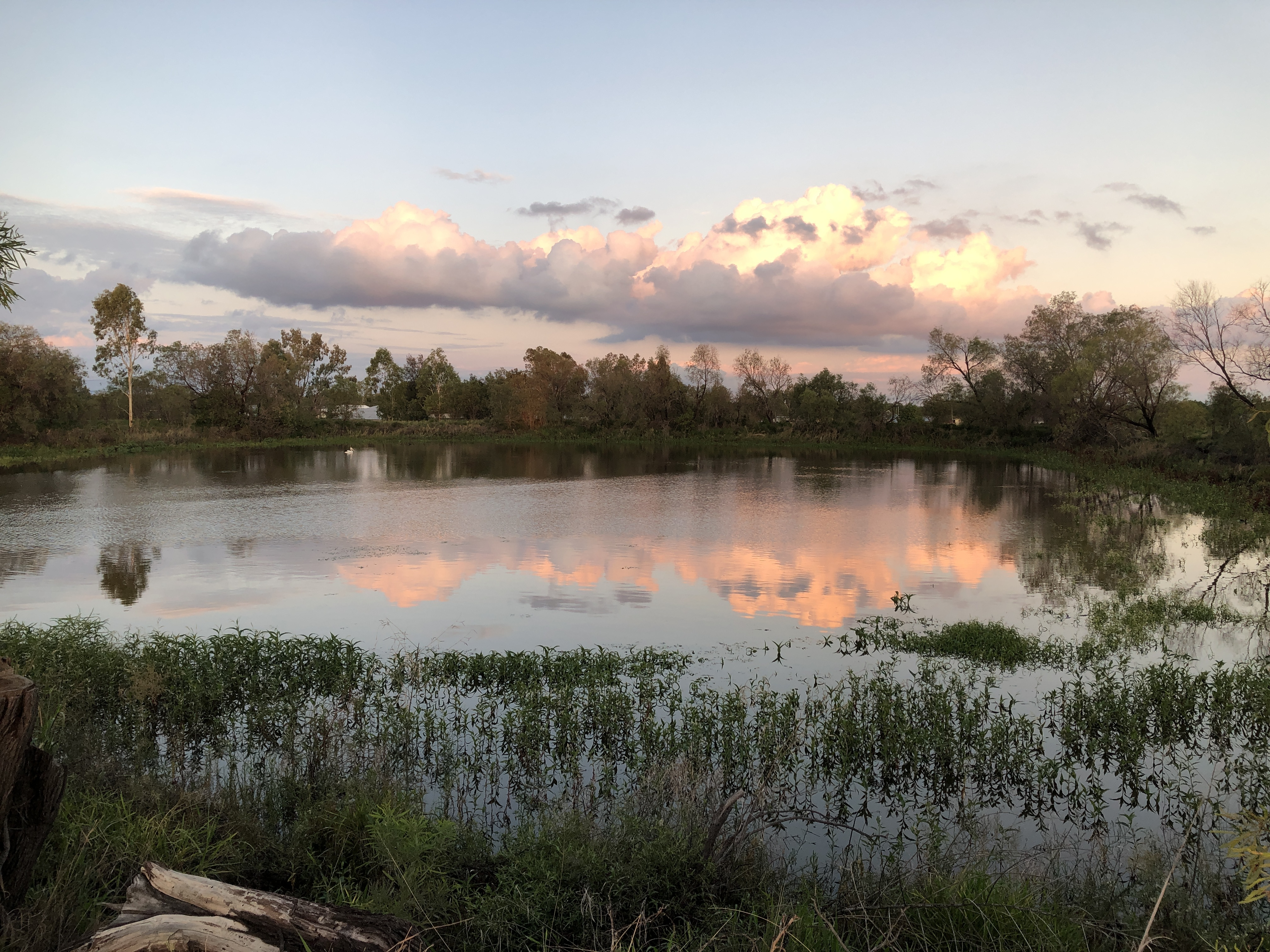
Roma Bush Gardens at sunset in summer

Hotels, pubs, and churches feature prominently near the centre of town. The ten hotels are within easy walking distance with most adjacent to another hotel.

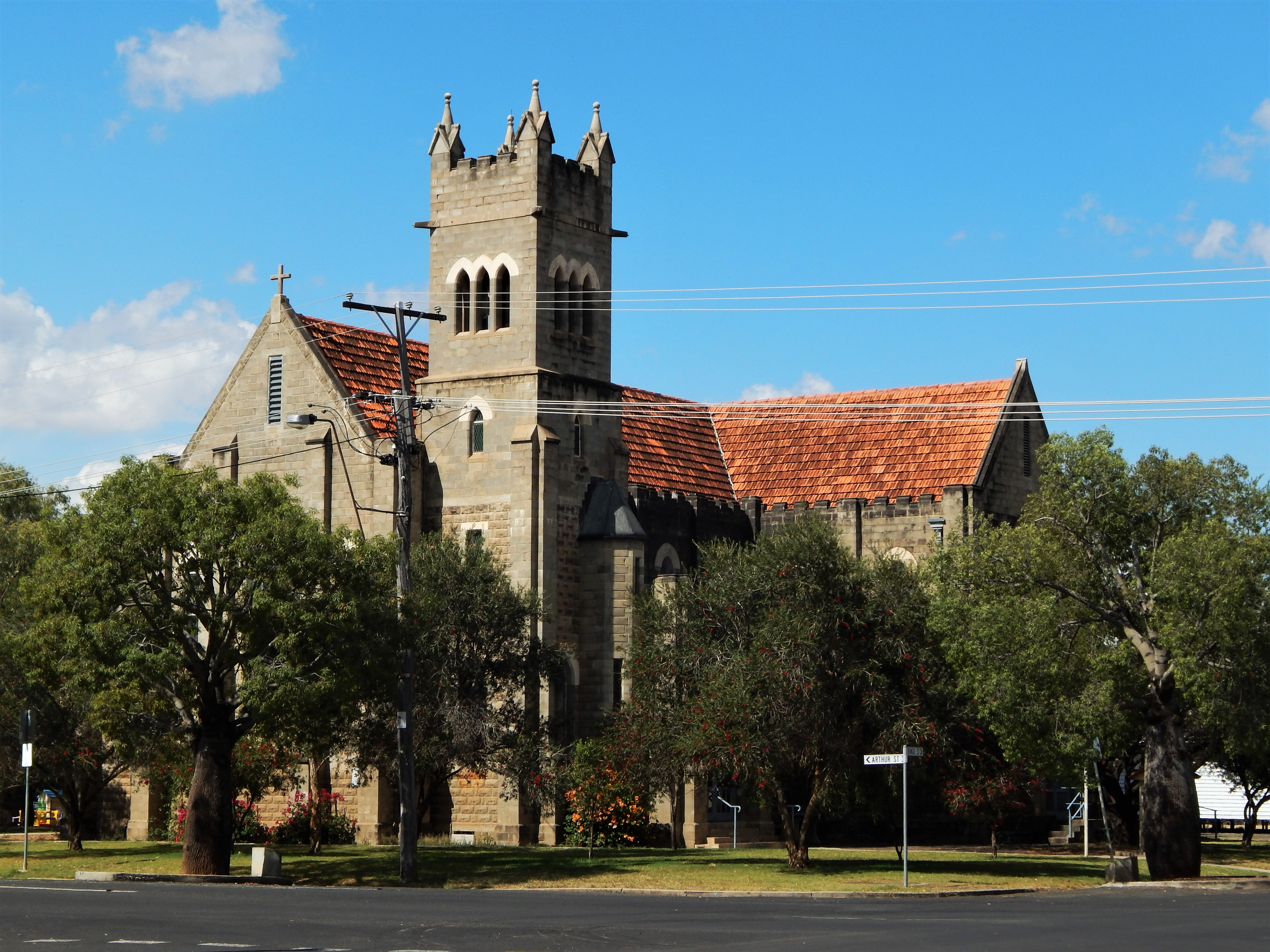
St Paul's Anglican Church

St Paul's Anglican Church which is part of the Anglican Diocese of Brisbane, is a copy of a 13th Century English Church in the shape of crucifix.

Roma Uniting Church is at 48–50 Bungil Street (26.5697°S 148.7892°E). The Roma Lutheran congregation holds their services at the Uniting Church.

The Revival Fellowship is full-gospel church that can be found at The Shed, 50 Bungil Street. Their sermons are 1pm on Sundays.

The Roma Public Library is situated with the Roma Community Arts Centre located at 38-44 Hawthorne Street and is part of the Maranoa Regional Council Library Service. The Maranoa Regional Council Library Service is part of the Rural Libraries Queensland service with online resources and library collections found at the Rural Libraries Queensland website. Public WiFi is provided via a ISDN High Speed Internet Connection to Brisbane (powered through the National Broadband Network).

The Roma branch of the Queensland Country Women's Association has its rooms at 57 Arthur Street.

The town is well serviced by four Caravan Parks, the Villa Holiday Park, the Big Rig Tourist Park, the Roma Clay Target Club Caravan Park, and the Ups N Downs Caravan Park.

== Attractions ==
Local tourist attractions include the Big Rig and Oil and Gas Museum, Romavilla Winery and Roma Saleyards. The winery is the oldest in Queensland.

Roma is also known for its bottle trees. With a girth of 9.51 metres, one specific bottle in Edwardes Street is promoted as one of Roma's tourist attractions.

== Events ==
Since 1977, Roma has hosted an annual 'Easter in the Country' event.

The annual Roma Show is held in May.

== Notable people ==
- Samuel Symons Bassett – established the Romavilla Winery
- Arthur Beetson – Australian rugby league captain and an "Immortal"
- Willie Carne – Australian rugby league international
- Albert Fuller Ellis – phosphate prospector
- Malcolm Farr – political journalist and commentator
- Wally Fullerton-Smith – Australian rugby league international
- A. M. Hertzberg – businessman and mayor
- Ray Higgs – Australian rugby league international
- Patrick Holland – novelist
- Dexter Kruger – supercentenarian, lived his life in regional Queensland as a grazier and veterinary surgeon
- Darren Lockyer – Australian rugby league player, captain of the Brisbane Broncos
- Fabian "Fabe" McCarthy – Australian rugby union international
- Ray Meagher – actor, amateur rugby player
- Bruce Scott – politician
- Brent Tate – Australian rugby league international
- Robin Thorne – Australian rugby league player

== See also ==
- Roma Airport
- Roma Power Station
- Hospital Hill fire
