= Samuel Symons Bassett =

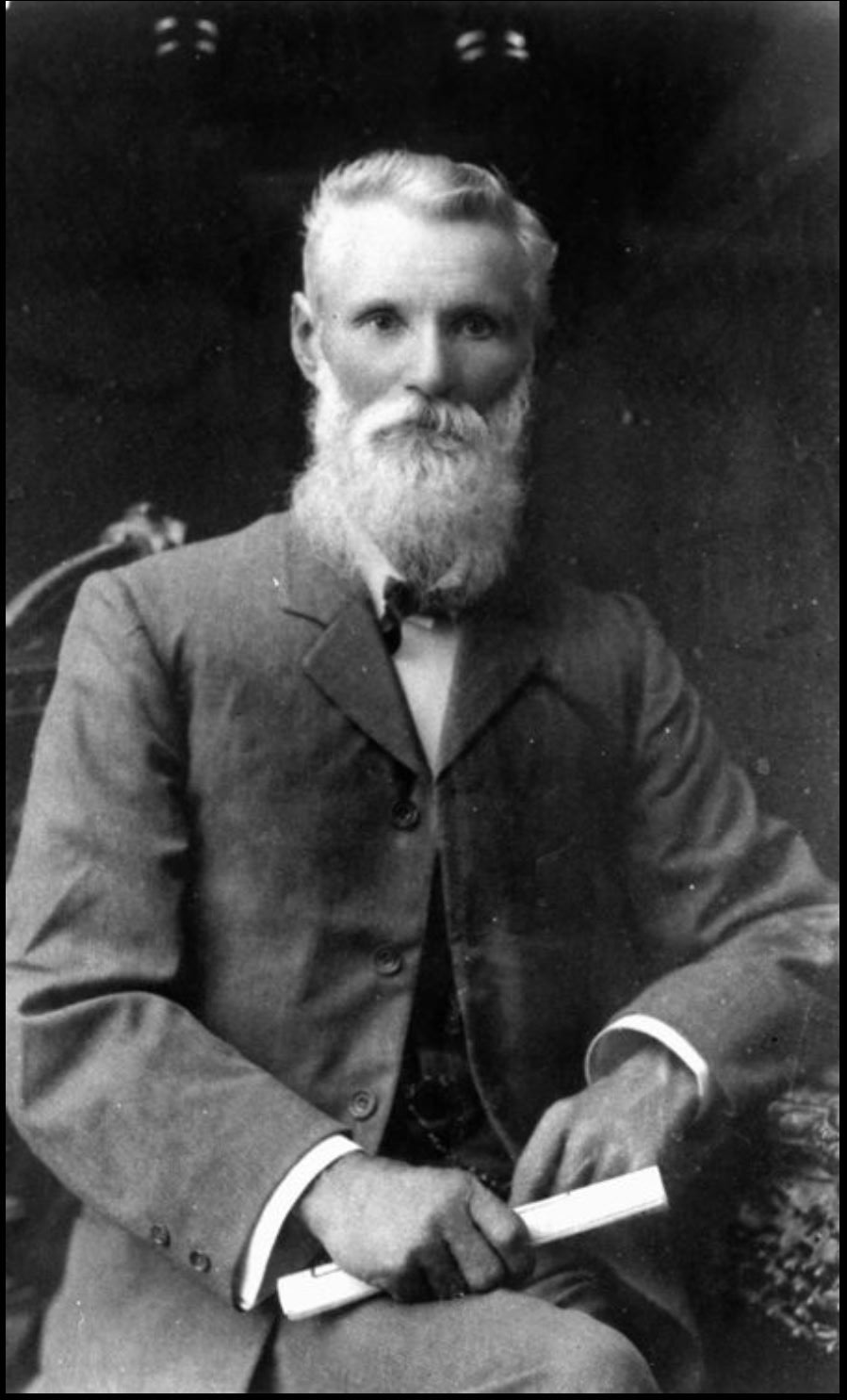
- Born: 13 March 1840; Pencorse, Summercourt, Cornwall, England
- Died: 25 December 1912 (aged 72); Roma, Queensland, Australia
- Resting place: St Paul's Anglican Church, Roma
- Other name: S. S. Bassett
- Citizenship: British
- Occupations: Winemaker; pastoralist; landowner
- Years active: 1866–1912
- Known for: Romavilla Winery
- Children: 9

Samuel Symons Bassett (1840–1912) was a pioneer wine maker in Roma, Queensland, Australia. He made the Roma district renowned throughout Queensland for the excellence of its grapes and its wines. As at 2020, his Romavilla Winery continues to operate and is listed on the Queensland Heritage Register.

== Early life ==
Bassett was born at Pencorse, Summercourt, in the county of Cornwall, south of England, on 13 March 1840. He was sixteen years of age when, after a voyage of several months in a sailing ship, he arrived at Sydney, and joined his uncle, J. Christian, a large pastoral proprietor in New South Wales, on his property on the Hunter River.

== Roma ==
In 1860 he came to Euthulla pastoral station, near Roma, in charge of a mob of travelling sheep, and remained in charge of this station for six years.

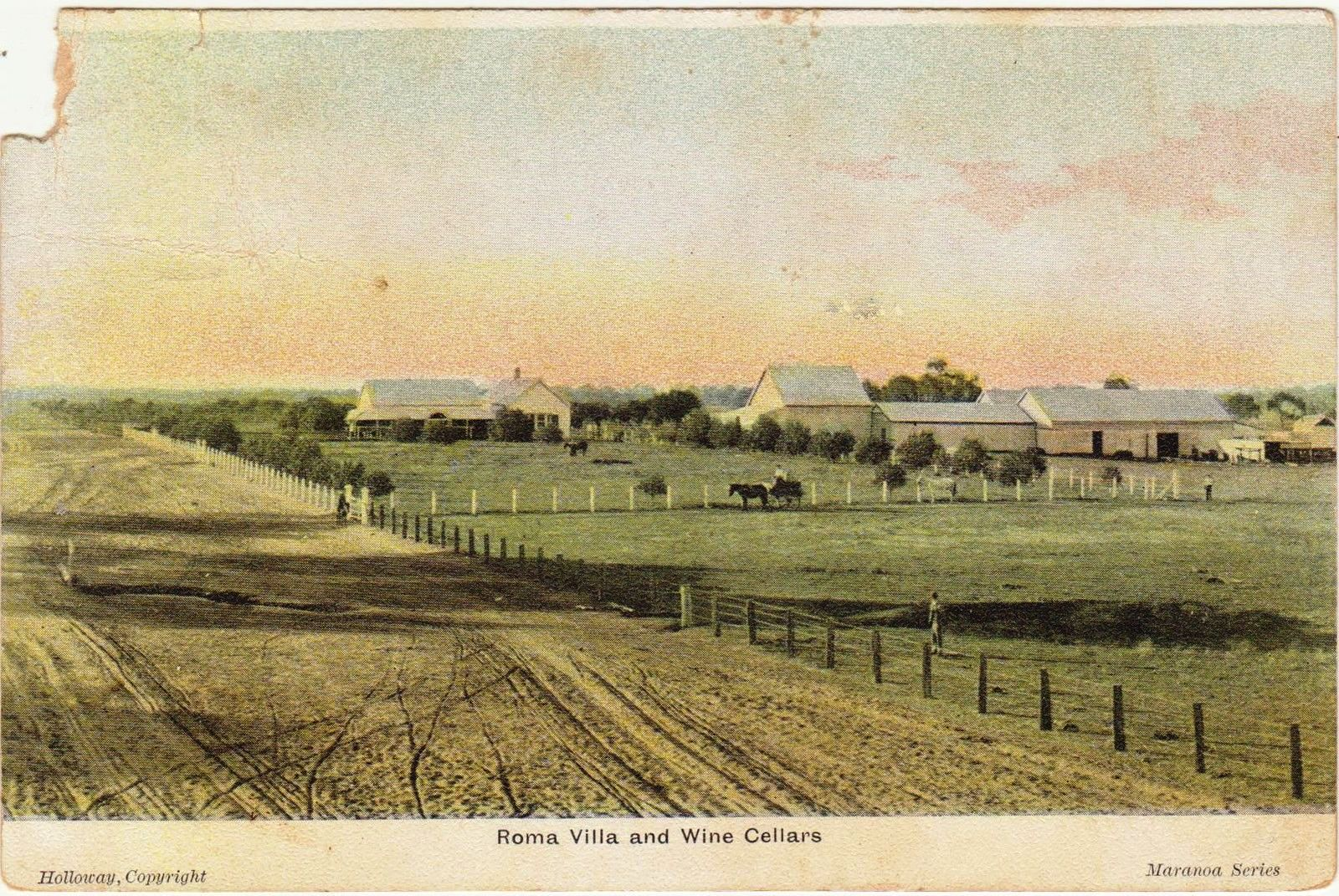
Romavilla Winery, circa 1910

He commenced vinegrowing at Roma, the first consignment of cuttings being landed at Roma by bullock wagon from Toowoomba, the journey taking about two months, laying the foundation of the Romavilla Winery, the largest vineyard and wine-making establishment in Queensland in his lifetime.

In the 1870s Bassett also entered into business in Roma as a general storekeeper with Mr. Skinner, and he also acquired a considerable interest withRobert Douglas in the well-known pastoral property, Mount Maria, in the Morven district. Relinquishing his interests in both of these ventures, Mr. Bassett had devoted the whole of his energy and attention to his vineyard.

For many years he was a large and regular exhibitor of wines at the Brisbane Exhibition, and winning many prizes. Bassett's wines held the premier place in the Queensland against all competitors, and won for their maker a very large number of valuable medals, some of which were secured at international exhibitions in Europe. In this way he laid the foundation of viticulture in this district, which, being taken up by others as time went on, found a source of employment for a large number of men and families. Year by year the Romavilla vineyards were extended, the capacity of the cellars increased, and the sale of the wines pushed further and further throughout Queensland. Bassett was never idle, and his industry infected everyone about him.

Bassett built a comfortable home, which became one of the principal attractions in the district, and where he and his wife were known for their generous hospitality. Bassett took a great interest in the progress of the district to which be had contributed so largely in such a practical way, and had an unwavering faith in its future.

== Later life ==
Ill-health forced him to relinquish the active management of his winery, and, accompanied by his wife, he sought to recuperate by taking a trip to the Pacific Islands, Tasmania, the North Coast, and other places. After a brief visit to Toowoomba, he returned to his home at Roma and died two months later on the afternoon of Christmas Day, 25 December 1912.

He was survived by his wife and their six sons and three daughters, Messrs. Robert, Frank, Samuel, William, Lionel, and Kenneth Bassett, and Mrs. J. C. Carlile (Cairns), Mrs. Hector Care (Roma), and Mrs. K. W. Nagel (Cairns). The funeral took place on Thursday 26 December, the interment being preceded by a short service at St. Paul's Anglican Church, and both that service and that at the graveside, at which the Reverend Dawson officiated, were attended by many residents of the town and district.
