= Bungil Creek =

Bungil
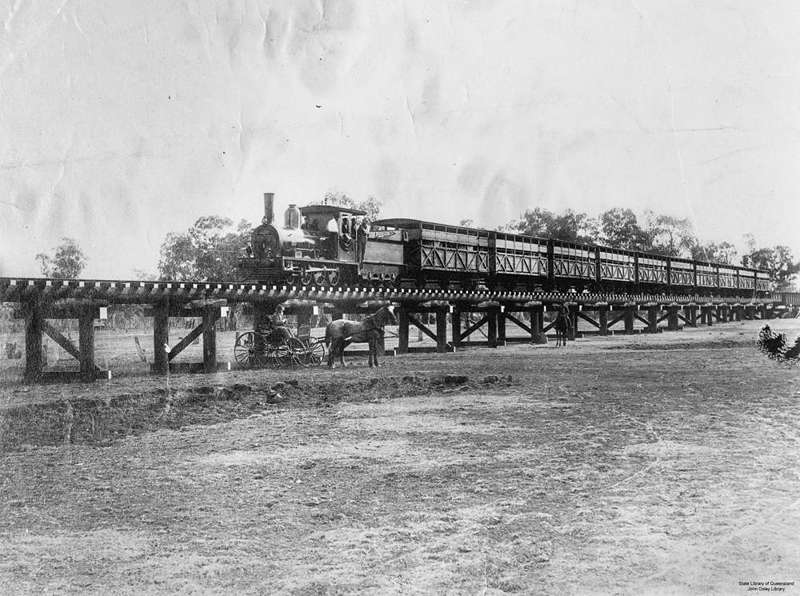

- Location of Bungil Creek mouth in Queensland

Location
- Country: Australia
- State: Queensland
- Region: South West Queensland
- Township: Roma

Physical characteristics
- Source: Great Dividing Range
  - location: below Bymount
  - coordinates: 26°04′38″S 148°35′09″E
  - elevation: 403 m (1,322 ft)
- Mouth: confluence with the Spring Creek
  - location: north of Surat
  - coordinates: 27°06′29″S 149°03′35″E
  - elevation: 244 m (801 ft)
- Length: 233 km (145 mi)

Basin features
- River system: Balonne catchment, Murray-Darling basin

The Bungil Creek, part of the Balonne catchment within the Murray-Darling basin, is a perennial stream in South West Queensland, Australia.

== Course and features ==
The headwaters of the creek rise on the south-western slopes of the Great Dividing Range, below Bymount and north of Roma. The creek flows southeast through the town of Roma, with the Carnarvon Highway following much of the course of the creek. North of Surat, the Bungil Creek reaches its confluence with the Spring Creek, a tributary of the Balonne River. The flow of the creek varies significantly from a very small trickle to a raging river after heavy rain. The creek descends 160 metres (520 ft) over its 233-kilometre (145 mi) course, with a catchment area of 710 square kilometres (270 sq mi).

The creek floods regularly, once inundating hundreds of properties in Roma. In March 2010, Bungil Creek experienced a major flood of 8.1 metres (27 ft), with a peak flood height of 7.6 metres (25 ft) in April 2011. Government funding enabled the construction of a levee for flood mitigation after devastating flooding in 2012. A ceremony to mark the commencement of construction for Stage 1 of a 5.2-kilometre (3.2 mi) long levee was held in September 2013.

== See also ==
- List of rivers of Australia § Queensland
