= The Western Star (Queensland) =

Australian newspaper

- Language: English
- Country: Australia

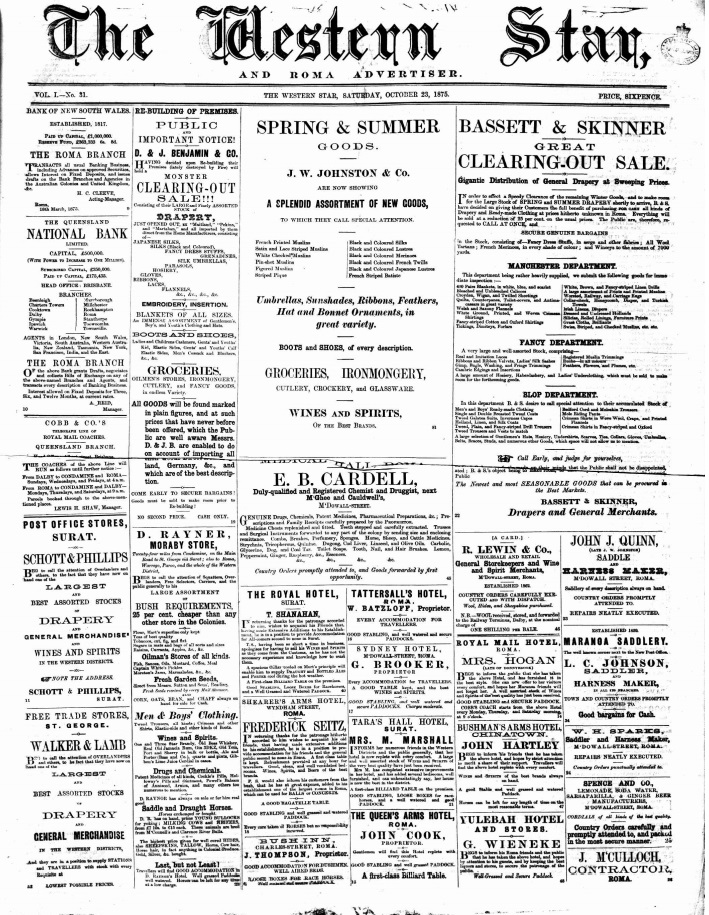
Front page of The Western Star and Roma Advertiser, 23 October 1875

The Western Star and Roma Advertiser, later published as the Western Star, is one of the longest continuously published newspapers in outback Queensland. It was published in Roma from 27 March 1875 to 1948, before continuing as the Western Star from 1948 to the present day.

== History ==
The Western Star and Roma Advertiser was published by Francis Kidner as a weekly newspaper from 1875 to 28 September 1878, a bi-weekly from 1 October 1878 to 1939, and as a weekly from 1940 to 1948. As the Western Star, it was published as a weekly from 1948 to 22 April 1949, before becoming bi-weekly once more.

From 11 January 1952, the Western Star declared itself to be "the largest bi-weekly in Queensland".

Along with many other regional Australian newspapers owned by NewsCorp, the newspaper ceased print editions in June 2020 and became an online-only publication from 26 June 2020.

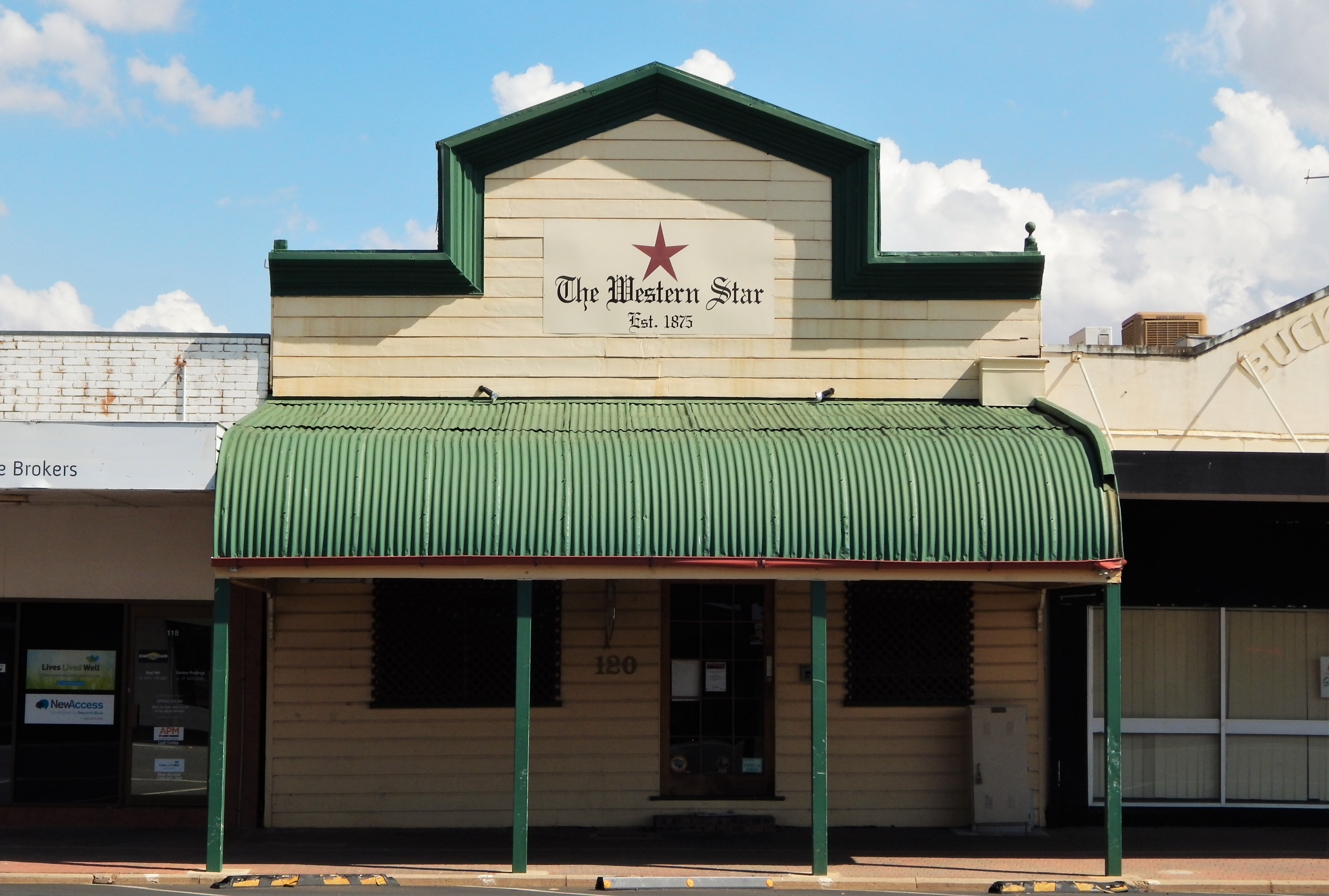
The Western Star newspaper office

== Digitisation ==
The paper has been digitised as part of the Australian Newspaper Digitisation Program of the National Library of Australia.

== See also ==
- List of newspapers in Australia
