= Roma War Memorial and Heroes Avenue =

War Memorial and Heroes Avenue
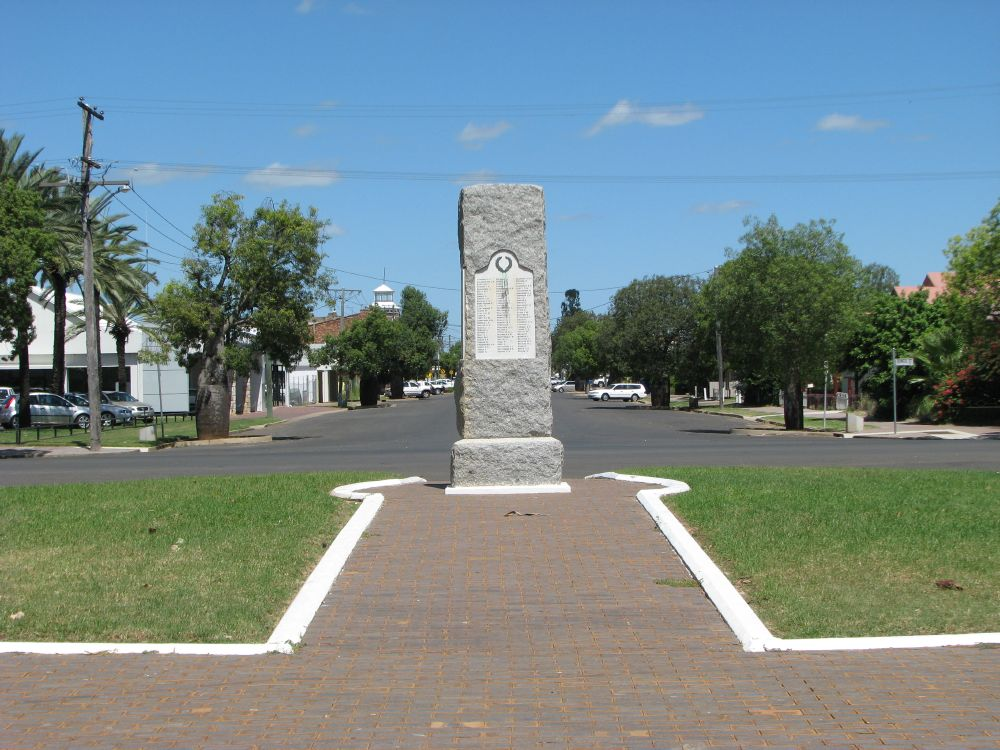
- Roma War Memorial, 2010

- Location within Queensland
- 26.5692°S 148.7886°E
- Location: Bungil Street, Roma, Maranoa Region, Queensland, Australia

History
- Design period: 1919–1930s (interwar period)
- Built: 1920

Queensland Heritage Register
- Official name: War Memorial and Heroes Avenue
- Type: state heritage (built, landscape)
- Designated: 21 October 1992
- Reference no.: 600824
- Significant period: 1920 (social); 1920, 1938, 1983 (historical); 1920s–1930s (fabric)
- Significant components: tree groups – avenue of, memorial – plaque, park / green space, memorial – cenotaph, memorial – cairn, trees of social, historic or special significance, pathway/walkway, memorial – tree/avenue of trees

War Memorial and Heroes Avenue is a heritage-listed memorial at Bungil Street, Roma, Maranoa Region, Queensland, Australia. It was built in 1920. It was added to the Queensland Heritage Register on 21 October 1992.

== History ==
The Roma War Memorial was completed in two stages; the avenues of trees followed by the cenotaph.

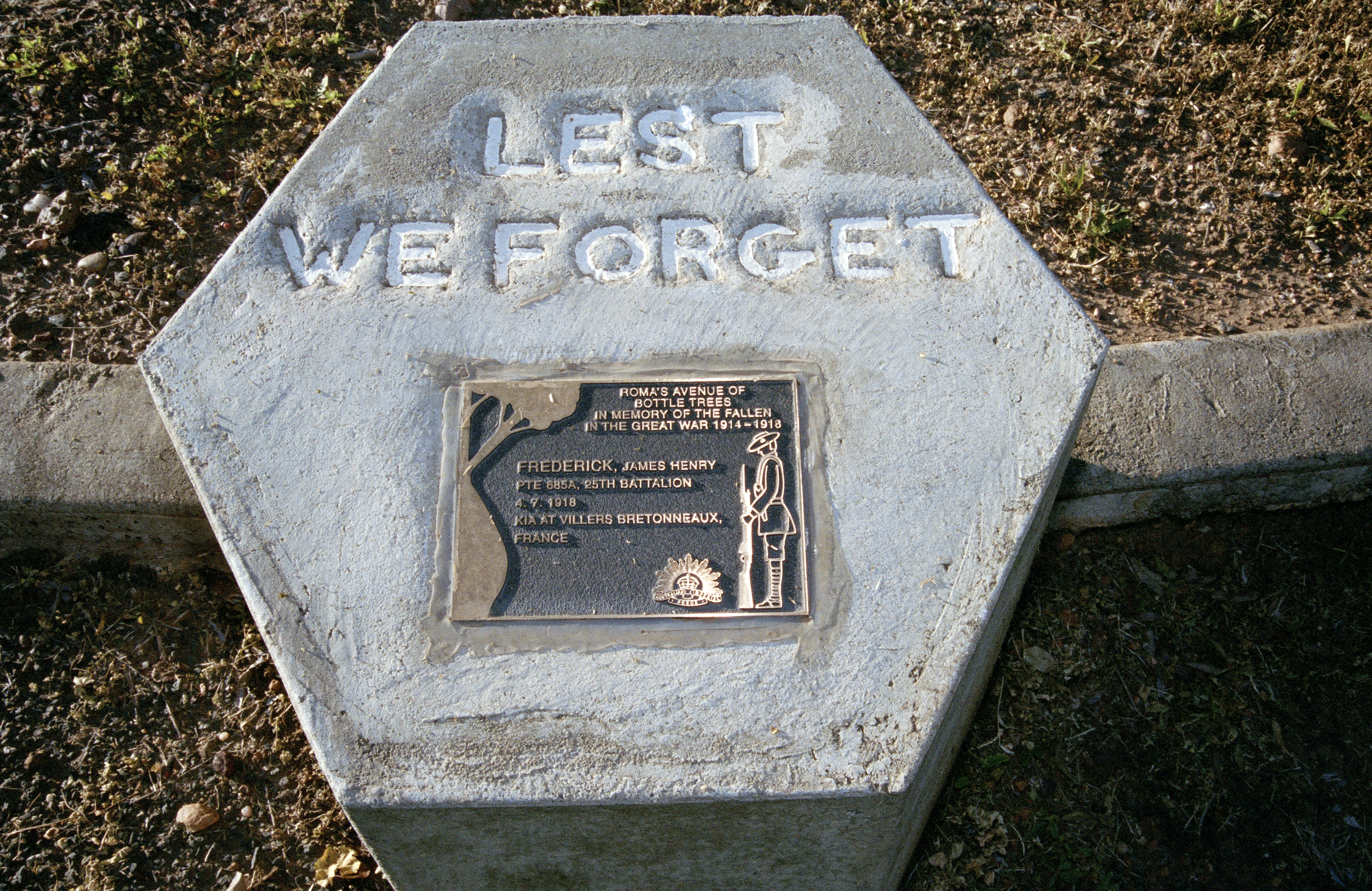
Memorial plaque to commemorate an individual World War I soldier, 2005

The Heroes Avenue of 93 bottle trees (Brachychiton rupestris) was planted by 1920, with the first 27 trees planted on 20 September 1918, and was the initial memorial to those killed in the First World War. Each tree originally bore a brass plaque stating the name of one of the 93 local men who fell during the First World War. Only one of these plaques survives, now on a cairn which was dedicated by the Roma RSL sub-branch on Remembrance Day, 1983. The cairn is located outside the Post Office near the corner of McDowell and Wyndham Streets. It also provides information regarding the rows of bottle trees and lists the 93 names originally displayed on the trees. Some of the original trees have been replaced and some have been removed to allow for increases in traffic.

The impetus for the Heroes Avenue began with the Mayor of Roma, Alderman Miscamble who had been impressed by avenues of memorial trees in southern states. The bottle tree was selected as it was a species commonly associated with Roma and it is thought that the first was planted in 1918 to commemorate the death of local soldier Lt Cpl Norman Saunders who was killed in France in 1916. This is the tree located outside the Post Office and known locally as the Tree of Knowledge. Trees were planted to commemorate subsequent deaths and although the plaques have disappeared each tree still retains its association with a particular soldier.

The Cenotaph is located in Queen's Park and was commissioned by the Local Repatriation Committee. It was unveiled on Anzac Day, 25 April 1938 by Colonel Sir Donald Cameron and honours the 93 local men who fell in the First World War (the same names that were originally recorded on the trees) and the 39 who fell in the Second World War. The erection of the cenotaph was delayed as the Committee's first priority was to provide for the welfare of returned soldiers. A memorial honour board had already been erected by the committee in the Town Hall.

Planted behind the monument are nine pine trees which were grown from seeds allegedly collected at Lone Pine, Gallipoli.

The traditional ANZAC Day march moves from the Roma railway station to the cenotaph in Queen's Park.

Australia, and Queensland in particular, had few civic monuments before the First World War. The memorials erected in its aftermath became the country's first national monuments, commemorating the devastating impact of the war on a young nation. Australia lost 60,000 people from a population of about 4 million, representing one in five of those who served. No previous or subsequent war has had such an impact on the nation.

Even before the end of the war, memorials became a spontaneous and highly visible expression of national grief. To those who erected them, they were as sacred as grave sites, substitute graves for the Australians whose bodies lay in battlefield cemeteries in Europe and the Middle East. British policy decreed that the Empire war dead were to be buried where they fell. The word "cenotaph", commonly applied to war memorials at the time, literally means "empty tomb". Australian war memorials are distinctive in that they commemorate not only the dead. Australians were proud that their first great national army, unlike other belligerent armies, was composed entirely of volunteers, men worthy of honour whether or not they paid the supreme sacrifice. Many memorials honour all who served from a locality, not just the dead, providing valuable evidence of community involvement in the war. Such evidence is not readily obtainable from military records, or from state or national listings, where names are categorised alphabetically or by military unit.

Australian war memorials are also valuable evidence of imperial and national loyalties, at the time, not seen as conflicting; the skills of local stonemasons, metalworkers and architects; and of popular taste. In Queensland, the digger (soldier) statue was the popular choice of memorial, whereas the obelisk predominated in the southern states, possibly a reflection of Queensland's larger working-class population and a lesser involvement of architects.

Many of the First World War monuments have been updated to record local involvement in later conflicts, and some have fallen victim to unsympathetic re-location and repair.

== Description ==
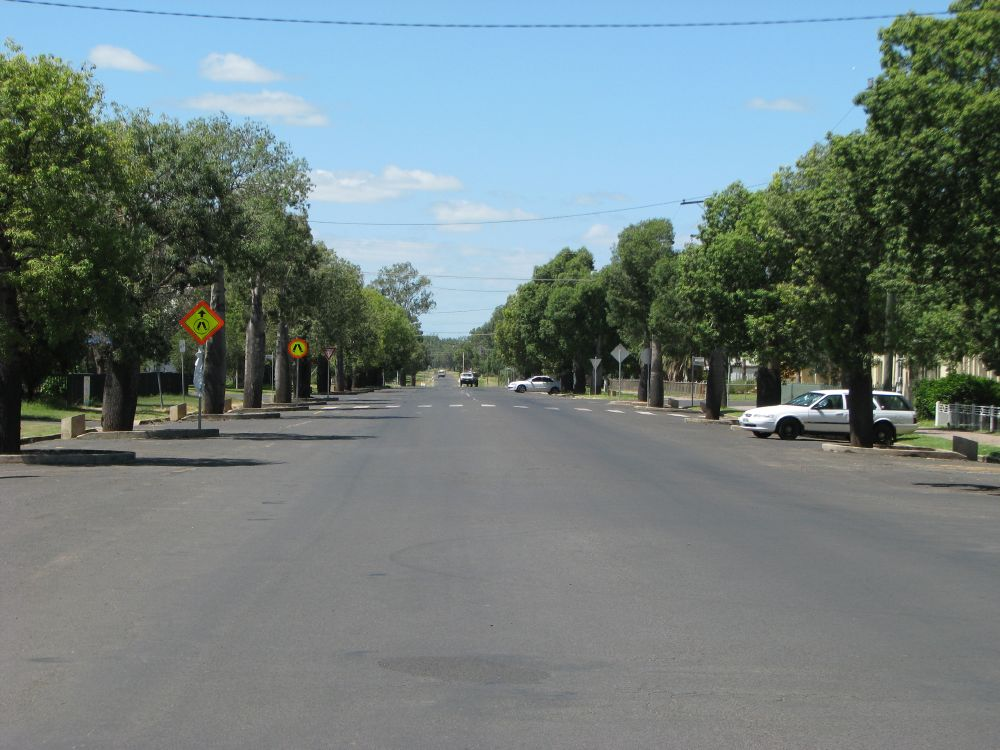
Heroes Avenue, 2010

The First World War Memorial encompasses a large area and comprises the avenues of trees, the cairn and the cenotaph.

The avenue of trees begins at the Roma railway stations, turns right into Wyndham Street and left into Bungil Street ending just after the intersection with Hawthorne Street. There are over 90 trees, all of which are bottle trees (Brachychiton rupestris).

The cairn is located outside the Post Office and is a white painted concrete pillar with a large chamfer on the top corner. The chamfered face displays a bronze plaque with the names of the 93 local men who fell in the First World War. These names were originally located on plaques attached to each tree.

The memorial located in Queen's Park comprises a cenotaph sitting on a slightly larger base, both of rock faced pale grey granite. The cenotaph has three leaded marble plaques which are recessed into the granite. The front face (facing Bungil Street) bears Laurence Binyon's ode "For the Fallen" with a bronze AIF badge above. The rear plaque bears the 93 names of the fallen with a bronze laurel wreath above. A later plaque has been added to the eastern side to commemorate the 39 local men who fell in the Second World War.

The cenotaph is located in the centre of a paved area facing the end of the avenue of bottle trees. It is surrounded by a formal setting of kerbed paths and grassed areas. Encircling it is a semi-circle of nine pine trees which are allegedly grown from seeds collected from the Lone Pine at Gallipoli.

== Fallen soldiers ==
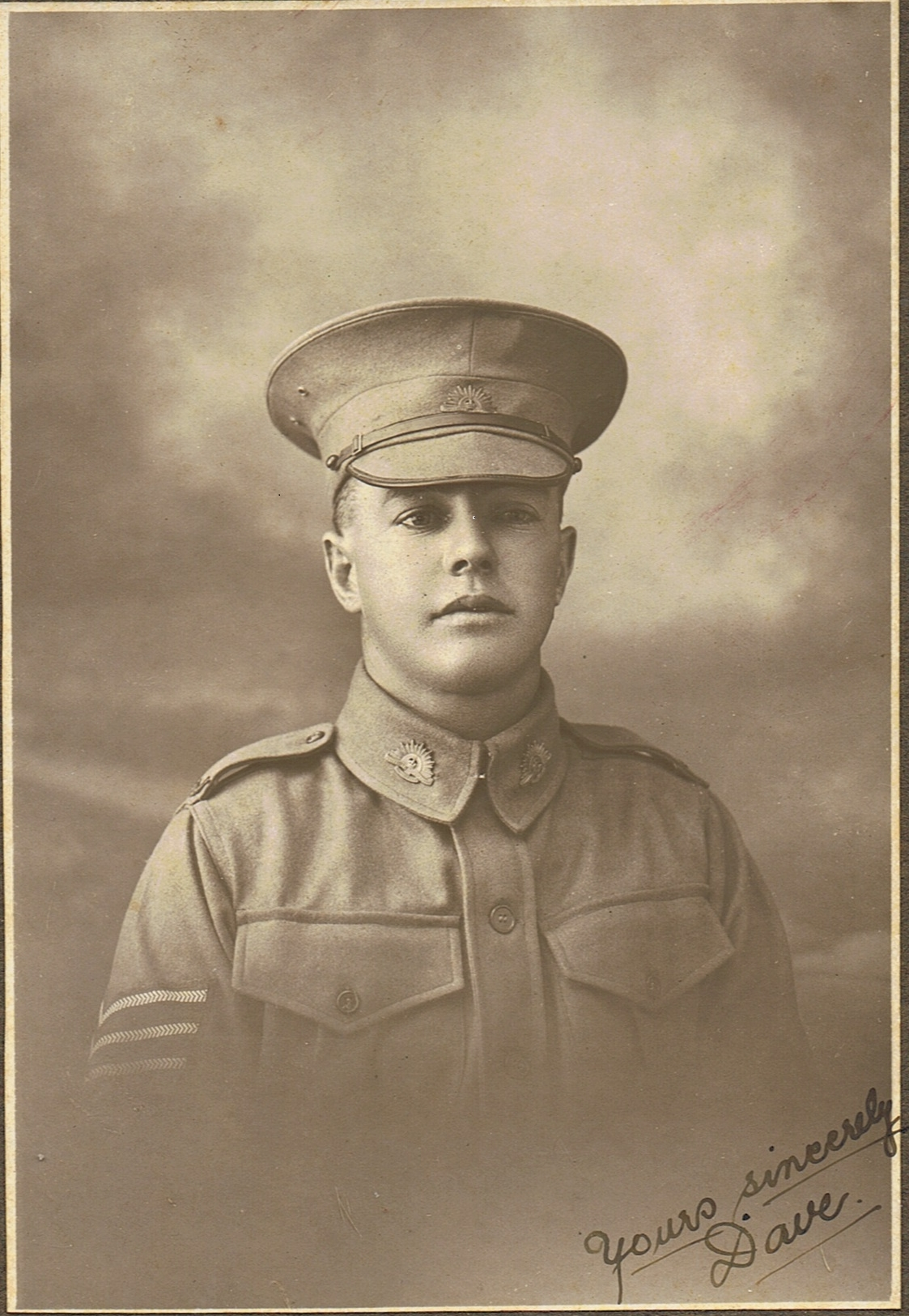
David Alexander Murphy, Lance Corporal 15th Battalion of Roma

The fallen soldiers commemorated by the War Memorial and associated avenue of bottle trees include:

- Neil McMaster Crawford, Private 31st Battalion, died 26 September 1917 at the Battle of Menin Road
- James Henry Frederick, Private 25th Battalion, died 4 July 1918, memorial at Crucifix Corner Cemetery Villers-Bretonneux, The Somme, France.
- David Alexander Murphy, Lance Corporal 15th Battalion, cabinet maker, friend of Neil Crawford, died at Polygon Wood 26 September 1917, memorial on Menin Gate, Ypres.

== Heritage listing ==
War Memorial and Heroes Avenue was listed on the Queensland Heritage Register on 21 October 1992 having satisfied the following criteria.

The place is important in demonstrating the evolution or pattern of Queensland's history.

War Memorials are important in demonstrating the pattern of Queensland's history as they are representative of a recurrent theme that involved most communities throughout the state. They provide evidence of an era of widespread Australian patriotism and nationalism, particularly during and following the First World War.

The Roma avenue of trees was planted by 1920, and the "cenotaph" was erected in 1938.

The place demonstrates rare, uncommon or endangered aspects of Queensland's cultural heritage.

Avenues of trees as memorials, and particularly those where each tree is attributed to a particular fallen serviceman are uncommon in Queensland. Most memorials erected during or after the First World War were of the monumental type.

The place is important in demonstrating the principal characteristics of a particular class of cultural places.

The monuments manifest a documentary record and are demonstrative of popular taste in the inter-war period.

It demonstrates the principal characteristics of a commemorative structure erected as an enduring record of a major historical event. This is achieved through the use of appropriate materials and design elements

The place is important because of its aesthetic significance.

The war memorial planting is arguably one of the most impressive in Queensland and is of aesthetic significance as a dominant landmark in the town.

The place has a strong or special association with a particular community or cultural group for social, cultural or spiritual reasons.

It has a strong and continuing association with the community as evidence of the impact of a major historic event and as the focal point for the remembrance of that event.
