= Butcher knife =

Knife mainly for butchering animal carcasses

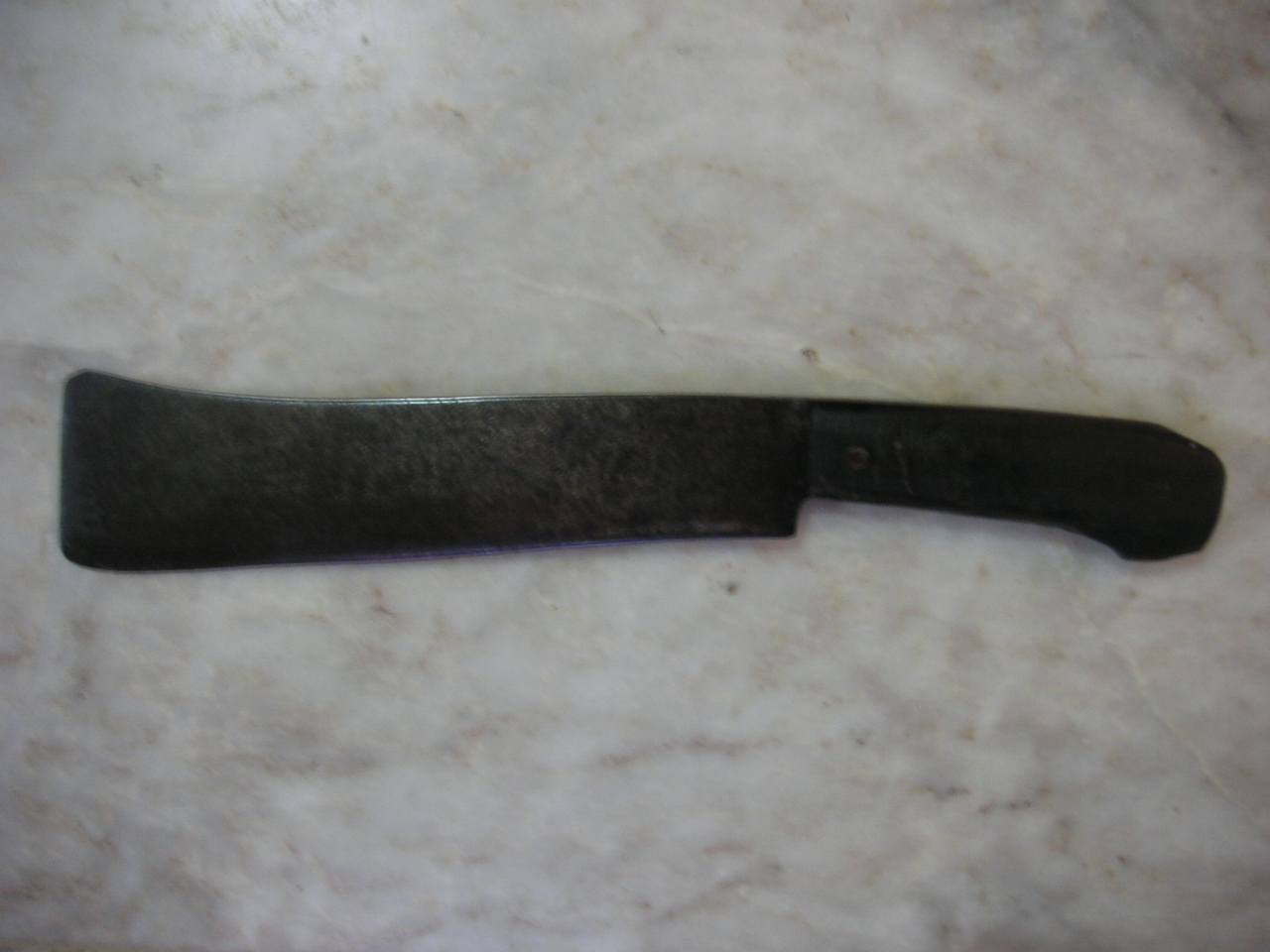
A native butcher knife from the Philippines

A butcher knife or butcher's knife is a knife designed and used primarily for the butchering or dressing of animal carcasses. There are many such types of these knives, which are the primary tool used by butchers.

== Use ==
Today, the butcher knife is used throughout the world in the meat processing trade. The heftier blade works well for splitting, stripping and cutting meat. Other similar meat-cutting knives include the carving knife and the cleaver. The carving knife is usually designed for slicing thin cuts of meat and often has a blunt or rounded point, with a scalloped or Granton blade to improve separation of sliced cuts of meat. The cleaver is similar to the butcher's knife, but has a lighter and thinner blade for precision cutting.

=== Care ===
With regular use, butcher knives, like kitchen knives and other knives and cutting tools, become blunter over time; even the "best knife" loses its sharpness due to wear and tear from the food being cut or pressure from the cutting surface. The blade edge – especially in high-quality knives – is only a few hundredths of a millimetre thick and bends even with the most careful handling during cutting. The pointed, sharp edge (burr) of the blade gradually folds over; when magnified, the burr then looks more like a fine saw. This causes the knife to become blunt and no longer retains its edge.

The edges can be sharpened using a knife sharpener. Sometimes ceramic sharpening rods or electric sharpeners are used, and occasionally whetstones, such as when using particularly hard knives made in Japan. While the function is basically the same for every device, the various models differ in the grinding material. Diamond, ceramic, or steel can be used. (To ensure the edges are sharp, the grinding material must be harder than the material of the knife blade.)

As a rule, butcher's knives are sharpened briefly before use and several times a day during use. Depending on personal preference and availability or the respective operational practice, other sharpening aids or knife sharpeners are sometimes used. Over time, the "basic grind" wears off, so that simply aligning the edge on the sharpener is no longer sufficient to achieve the desired sharpness. According to expert recommendations, the knives should then be resharpened by a specialist such as a professional knife and scissors sharpener on grinding machines, and the "basic grind" renewed. Depending on the level of use, this should be done approximately every three to six months.

The knives must be cleaned regularly or after each use. Residues from highly concentrated cleaning agents, excessive exposure to the dishwasher, and protein and meat residue can lead to stains on the blades and, over time, even surface corrosion. According to expert recommendations, butcher knives should ideally be cleaned immediately after use with a mild, alkaline-based, non-acidic cleaning agent.

== History ==
In ancient times meat processing was primarily handled by the livestock farmers themselves, but with the establishment of large cities, a separate profession gradually developed that supplied city dwellers with meat - a butcher. Therefore, the special tool requirement initially lay primarily in cleavers and knives of various sizes, supplemented by a few smaller all-purpose knives.

From the late 18th century to the mid-1840s, the butcher knife was a key tool for mountain men. Simple, useful and cheap to produce, they were used for everything from skinning beaver, cutting food, self-defense, and scalping. During this time, John Wilson, of Sheffield, England, was a major exporter of this type of knife to the Americans. These knives can be identified by brand markings and the stamp I. Wilson. Heavy cleavers were traditionally hung up on a hook for ease of access.

== Types ==
=== Boning knife ===
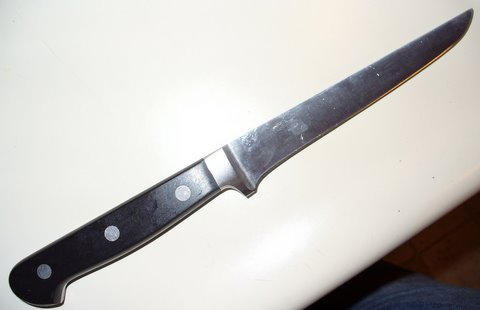
A boning knife

Depending on the meat and personal preferences, the boning knife is used with a blade length of 13–15 cm and with varying degrees of flexibility of the usually narrow blade. It is used to remove the bones and separate them from the meat, known as boning. The flexible blade can be guided close to the bone, so that as little meat as possible remains on the bone—except when cutting "meat bones." Boning knives are not as thick-bladed as some of other popular kitchen or butcher knives, as this makes precision boning, especially deep cuts and holes easier. A stiff boning knife is good for boning beef and pork, but a very flexible boning knife is preferred for poultry and fish.

=== Skinning knife ===
Used for easily separating animal skin from the meat (skinning) without damaging the meat. The special shape of the blade with its long edge allows for precise, even difficult cuts. It is available in various blade lengths.

=== Gutting knife ===
Also known as a hunting knife, a gutting knife is used to saw open the sternum of game. A section of the curved, beak-shaped, cutting edge is serrated. A ball at the tip of the cutting edge allows for safe cutting without damaging the entrails.

== See also ==
- List of butcher shops
- Butcher block
- Butcher soup
