= Butcher block =

Kitchen utensil

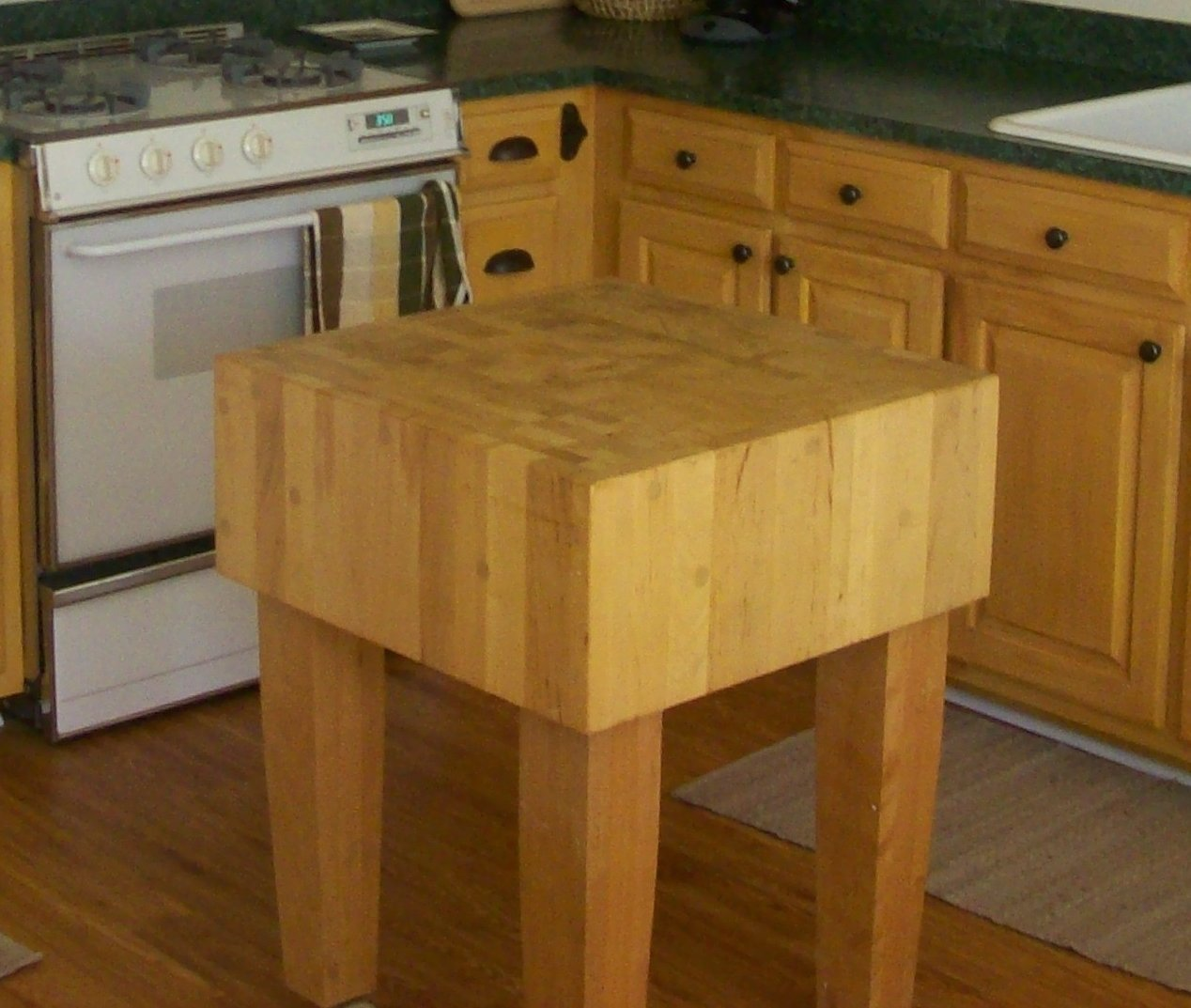
Butcher block in modern American kitchen

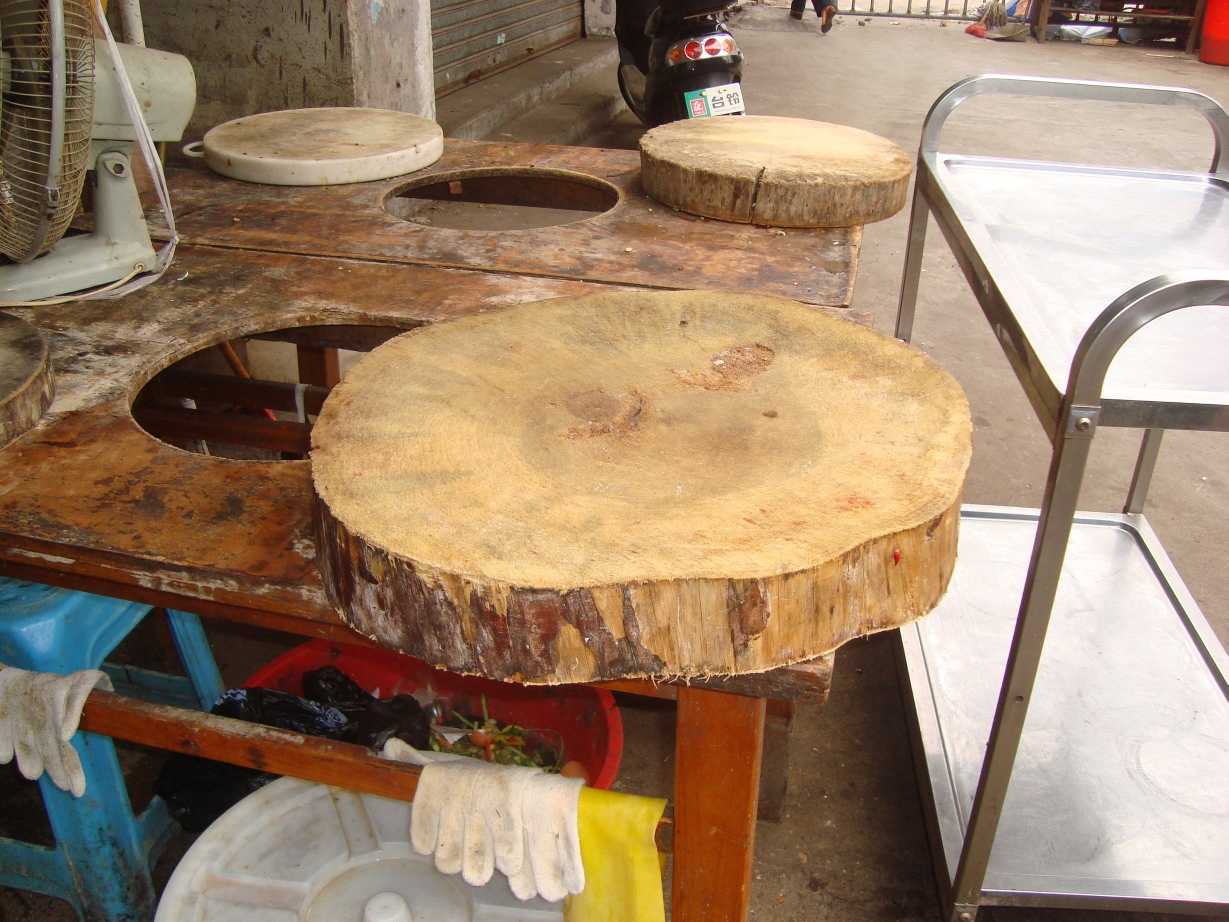
A circular chopping block used in a restaurant in Haikou, Hainan, China

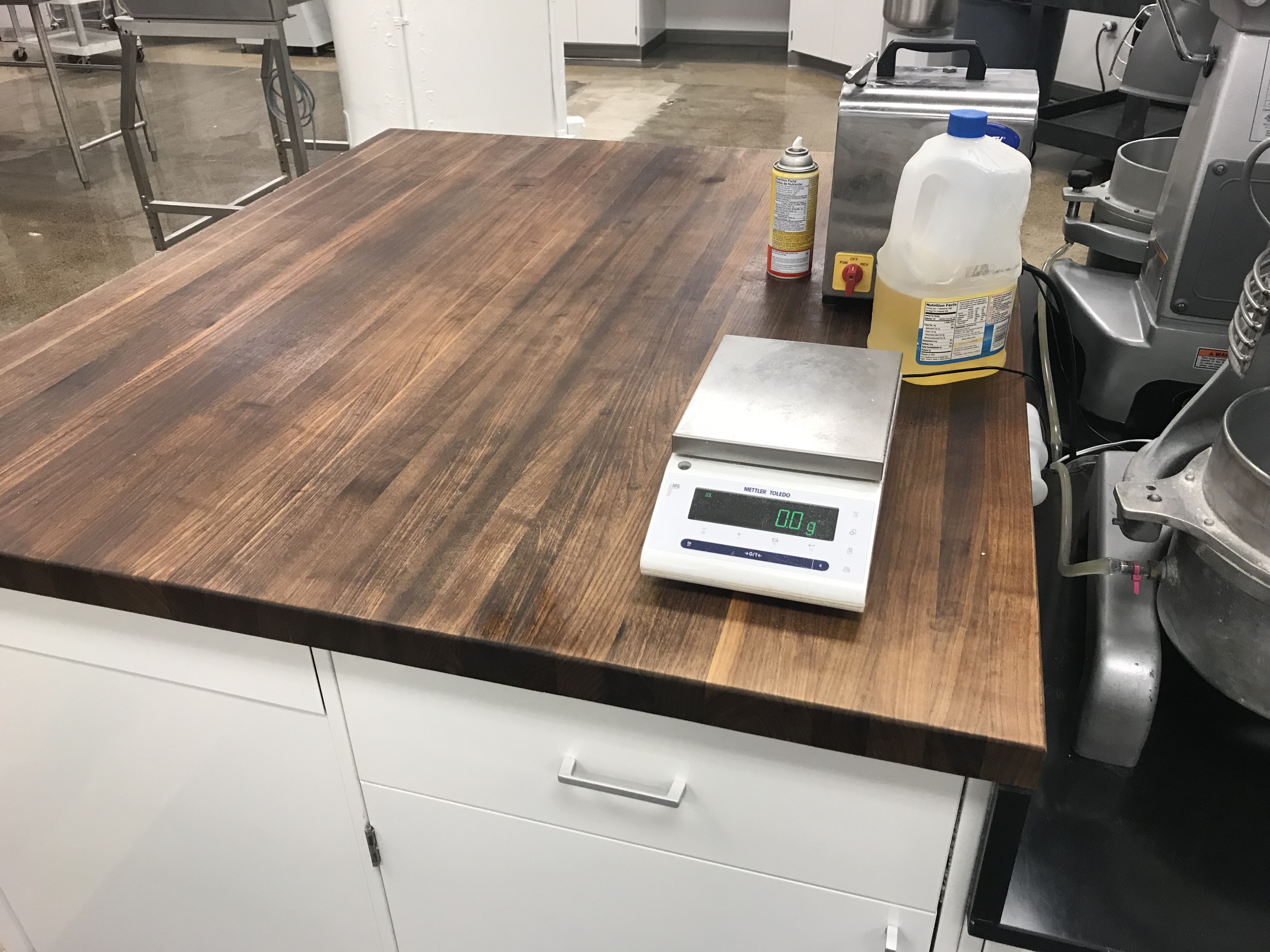
A black walnut butcher block countertop

A butcher block or butcher's block is a heavy-duty chopping block, typically laminated or hardwood. The term 'butcher block' can also refer to the pattern or style of a traditional block adapted to other functions, such as table tops and cutting boards.

Traditionally made of hard maple, it was commonly used in butcher shops and meat processing plants but has now become popular in-home use.

There are two basic styles of butcher block: end grain and edge grain. Besides maple, popular contemporary woods include teak, birch, or walnut, sometimes in alternating patterns. A simple variant of the function of a chopping block is made out of a several-inch-thick cross-section of a wide hardwood log.

== Use ==
Butcher blocks have been used in butcher shops for centuries and still are in many European countries. Increasingly, a version of butcher block is also being used in domestic kitchens as an alternative to stone and laminate countertops. This has created a new trend industry in the kitchen design arena, as it brings warmth and a natural touch to the kitchen.

Many furniture manufacturers and hardwood flooring companies are getting into the production of butcher blocks and butcher block countertops, in part because the countertops can be constructed from left-over wood that would otherwise be discarded and develops a charming pattern over time.

== See also ==
- List of butcher shops
- Butcher knife
- Butcher soup
