= Jewish Culture Month =

Multi-city Jewish culture festival (UK)

- Type: Commemorative month for British Jewish culture
- Begins: 16 May
- Ends: 15 June
- Duration: 1 month
- Frequency: Annual
- First time: 16 May 2026; 3 months ago
- Started by: Board of Deputies of British Jews

Jewish Culture Month is a multi-city festival in the United Kingdom celebrating Jewish history, literature, music, comedy, cuisine, fashion, architecture and religious heritage. The initiative was launched in 2026 by the Board of Deputies of British Jews, with the first year comprising around 150 events held between 16 May and 15 June 2026.

Participating institutions included the BBC, the Victoria and Albert Museum, the National Holocaust Museum, the British Library, the National Portrait Gallery and JW3.

According to one organiser, some in the Jewish artistic community worried that Jewish life in Britain had become too focused on trauma, antisemitism and security concerns after the 7 October attacks and the Heaton Park Synagogue attack, which took place on Yom Kippur 2025. As a result, one goal of the initiative was to present more positive narratives about the richness of Jewish life in the UK, with the 2026 slogan being “Less Oy, More Joy”.

== Programming ==
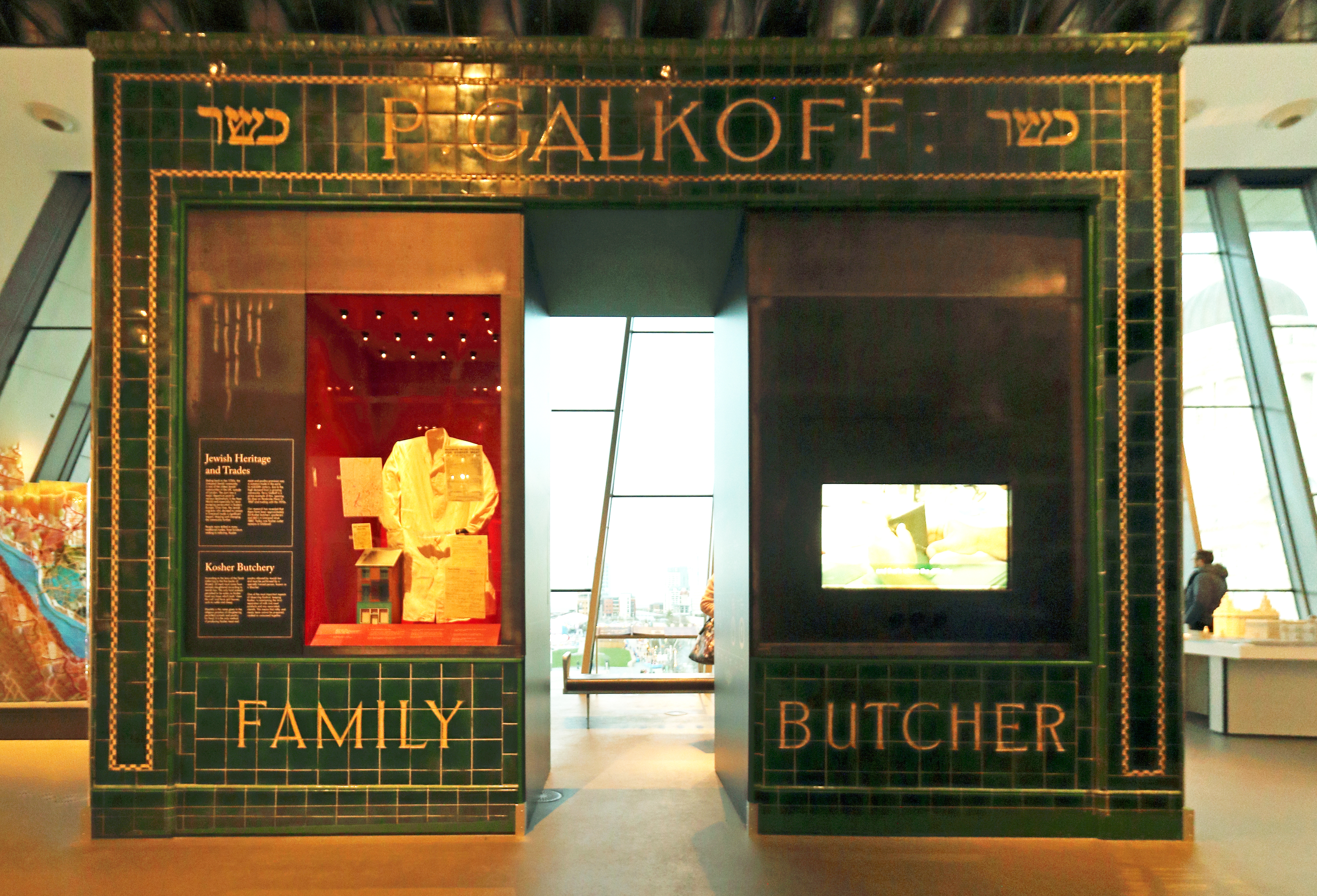
Tiles from Galkoff's kosher butcher shop, Museum of Liverpool

Jewish Culture Month seeks to highlight the ways in which British Jews have left a mark on culture in the UK, from medieval to contemporary times. In 2026, events were scheduled across various UK cities. For example, the Museum of Liverpool hosted a heritage trail that featured institutions around the city with significance to the Jewish community. This included places like Galkoff's kosher butcher shop, houses of worship, and local businesses such as Lewis's.

The programming in Manchester included a festival of short films, both comedies and dramas, that portrayed a range of Jewish experiences in the UK and Ireland. At the JW3 Arts Center in Hampstead, London, one event focused on how Jewish youth contributed to the 1970s punk scene in Britain. BBC Radio and Television featured educational content related to Jewish life, and there was also programming related to food, including a Jewish food fair in Liverpool and a panel discussion on food and culture.

Other participating institutions included the Victoria and Albert Museum, the Southbank Centre, the British Library, Oxford's Bodleian Library, the Little Theatre Cinema in Bath, the National Portrait Gallery, JW3, the Freud Museum, Museum of the Home, the Discovery Museum in Newcastle upon Tyne, the Willesden Jewish Cemetery, the Irish Jewish Museum of Dublin, and various synagogues and private homes.
