= Butchers Shop, Yungaburra =

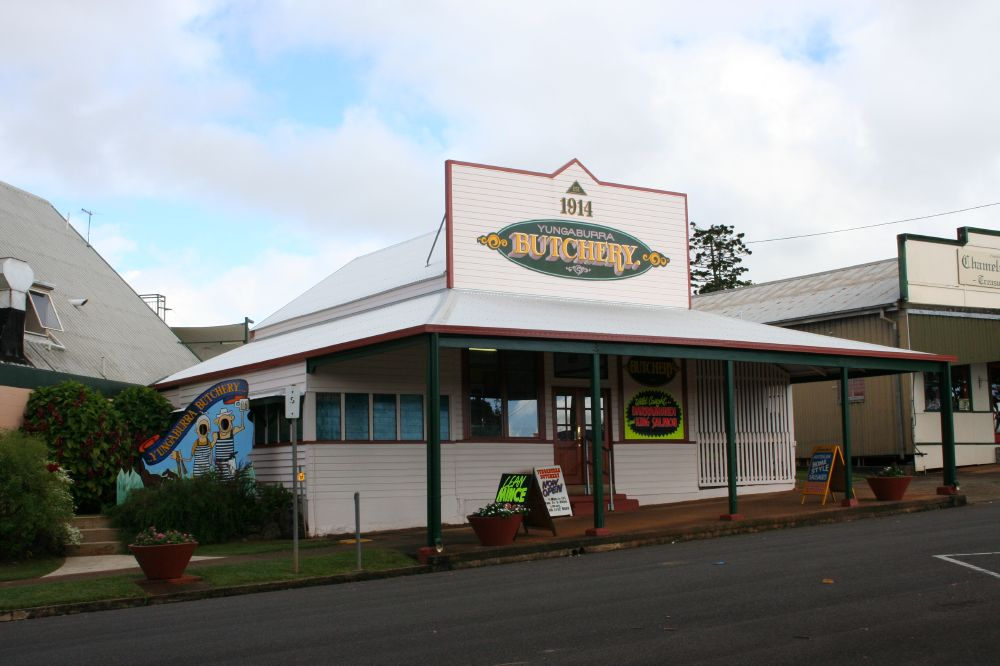
- Butchers Shop, 2007

- Location within Queensland Location within Australia
- 17.2699°S 145.5829°E
- Location: 2 Kehoe Place, Yungaburra, Tablelands Region, Queensland, Australia

History
- Design period: 1919–1930s (interwar period)
- Built: c. 1922

Queensland Heritage Register
- Official name: Butchers Shop
- Type: state heritage (built)
- Designated: 21 October 1992
- Reference no.: 600482
- Significant period: 1920s (fabric) c. 1922–ongoing (historical use)
- Significant components: strong room

Butchers Shop is a heritage-listed butcher shop at 2 Kehoe Place, Yungaburra, Tablelands Region, Queensland, Australia. It was built c. 1922. It was added to the Queensland Heritage Register on 21 October 1992.

== History ==
This shop has always been a butchery and is believed to have been built in 1922 for the Estate of HS Williams, which developed several businesses on land close to the Yungaburra railway station in the 1920s.

The first Europeans on the Atherton Tablelands were engaged in timbergetting and mining, but the rich soil and cool climate were thought particularly suitable for the development of agriculture. In 1885 a Village Settlement scheme was introduced which offered settlers 40-acre (16 ha) farm blocks with home sites clustered as a village. In 1888 a village settlement was laid out at Allumbah Pocket, later to become Yungaburra. At the same time the Tablelands railway from the port of Cairns to the Tableland was begun, although it took far longer to reach its objective than originally envisaged. The first farms at Allumbah were taken up in 1891, though the scheme proved unsuccessful. The railway reached Mareeba in 1895 and Atherton in 1903, greatly improving access to the area. Following new Land Acts in the early 1900s to encourage closer settlement which had more practical requirements, more people took up land around Allumbah. The land on which the butcher shop was later built, and which was to become the commercial heart of Yungaburra, was part of an Agricultural Farms selected by George O'Donnell in 1899. In 1900 the land was sold to George Wedderburn and subdivided into numerous small blocks in 1910. Six acres were acquired by the Railway Commissioner and the position of the new railway station caused a geographic shift in focus from the original settlement which was located towards the north west of the new commercial centre. Buildings were constructed or relocated near the railway. Two of the blocks positioned close to the station were purchased in 1911 by AS and FC Williams for a new hotel. The Williams family's interest in this area grew as they acquired land adjoining the hotel over the next few years.

H.S. Williams had arrived in Australia in the 1860s and worked in a number of occupations before taking up land at Scrubby Creek on the Tablelands. After losing his dairy cattle to tick in 1895, Williams turned to business and ran a store and butchery at Scrubby Creek and the Carriers Arms hotel at Carrington, he then acquired land in the original Allumbah settlement in 1898 and established a store. He was killed in an accident in 1905, but the family business was continued by his sons under the name of "Estate H.S. Williams". In 1907 they established a shanty hotel in Allumbah to serve packers and the navvies constructing the railway inching its way towards the town. In 1910, the railway line reached the settlement, which had been renamed Yungaburra to avoid confusion with another similarly named town. The railway link triggered a period of rapid development with the construction of a saw mill, a store and a large hotel for the Williams family opposite the railway station and a number of shops and houses. In 1911, Eacham Shire was formed.

In the 1923 post office directory the Estate of H.S. Williams is listed as operating a store, butchers and bakery and they presumably built these businesses about the same time in anticipation of the road link from Gordonvale, which had been under construction since 1920. The store was between the butchery and the hotel, but has since been demolished. In 1926 the Gillies Highway was opened and the role of Yungaburra as a gateway to the natural attractions of the Tablelands created a second period of development in the town due to the blossoming tourist trade to the nearby lakes.

In 1975 the butchery was sold and changed hands several times in the late 1970s and 80s before being purchased by the current butcher in 1992. The shop has modern equipment and interior finishes but its general appearance and functional layout appears to be substantially unchanged.

== Description ==
The butcher's shop is a single storey timber building with a steeply pitched gabled roof clad in corrugated iron. The long axis of the building is set at right angles to the street and the front has a square timber parapet. An awning with a corrugated iron roof, which is supported on timber posts with brackets, runs along the shop frontage. This awning roof has hips at each front corner and extends back along both sides of the building, though it has been enclosed at the sides to form extensions. That on the left hand side is built in with timber boards with louvres above and has a brick section at the rear left hand corner. That to the right hand side is enclosed with spaced palings at the front corner and fibrous cement sheeting and corrugated metal towards the rear.

The shop is entered by a central pair of doors flanked by windows. That to the right has been blocked. That to the left is filled with reinforced mesh, as is the transom above the door. Inside, there is a public area with a tiled floor and counter. There is a cold room to the right. To the rear of the building is a work area with a concrete floor. The built-in section on the left hand side of the butchery is used as office space and is linked to the shop area by a door. To the rear of the office is a small brick room, described as a former strong room, which is used for storage. The built in section on the right hand side is used for storage.

== Heritage listing ==
The Butchers Shop was listed on the Queensland Heritage Register on 21 October 1992 having satisfied the following criteria.

The place is important in demonstrating the evolution or pattern of Queensland's history.

As an early commercial building providing an important service, the butcher's shop marks the emergence of Yungaburra's role as a gateway to the Tablelands following the arrival of the railway in 1910 and the commencement of a road link with the coast in 1920. This facilitated the growth of agriculture and dairying on the Tablelands and heralded the development of tourism in the area.

The place is important in demonstrating the principal characteristics of a particular class of cultural places.

The butcher's shop is a good and intact example of the type of simple timber commercial building which served many new settlements and has been continuously in use as a butchery.

The place is important because of its aesthetic significance.

In its form, scale and detail it makes a substantial contribution to the built character of Yungaburra.

The place has a strong or special association with a particular community or cultural group for social, cultural or spiritual reasons.

As a building constructed as part of the Williams Estate, the butchery has in important association with the Williams family who made a major contribution to the commercial development of Yungaburra.

== See also ==
- List of butcher shops
- List of oldest companies in Australia
