= State Butchers Shop, Roma =

Australian historic building of WWI in Queensland

State Butchers Shop
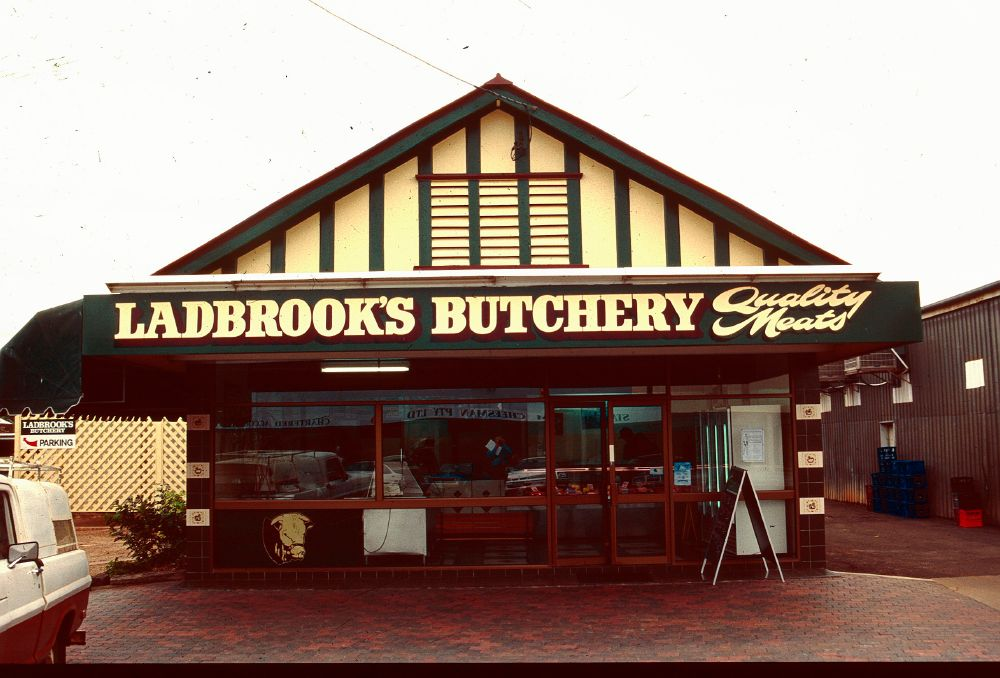
- State Butchers Shop, Roma, 2000

- Location within Queensland Location within Australia
- 26.5726°S 148.7891°E
- Location: 75 Arthur Street, Roma, Maranoa Region, Queensland, Australia

History
- Design period: 1914–1919 (World War I)
- Built: 1919

Site notes
- Architect: Government Architect's Office

Queensland Heritage Register
- Official name: State Butchers Shop (former), Bushell's Meats, Dore & Donald Butchers, Ladbrook's Butchery
- Type: state heritage (built)
- Designated: 27 April 2001
- Reference no.: 602155
- Significant period: 1919 (fabric); 1910s–1920s (historical)
- Significant components: cold room/cold store, toilet block/earth closet/water closet

State Butchers Shop is a heritage-listed butcher shop at 75 Arthur Street, Roma, Maranoa Region, Queensland, Australia. It was designed by Government Architect's Office and built in 1919. It is also known as Bushell's Meats, Dore & Donald Butchers, and Ladbrook's Butchery. It was added to the Queensland Heritage Register on 27 April 2001.

== History ==
This single-storeyed brick shop was erected in 1919 for the Queensland Government as a purpose-designed State Butcher's Shop. From 1915 to 1929, 90 State butcher's shops operated in Queensland for various periods, mostly in leased or purchased premises. The peak number of shops operating at any one time was 72, in 1922–1923. The Roma shop was one of Queensland's few purpose-designed State butcheries, and one of the more substantial of the regional State butcher's shops.

In 1915 T. J. Ryan's Labor government won office in wartime Queensland on the strength of promises to improve living standards - principally by addressing the problems of high commodity prices, price-fixing and the emergence of monopolies. The Labor party in general and Ryan and his Treasurer, Ted Theodore, in particular, advocated public ownership of key economic activities, in competition with private enterprise, but at fair prices. They argued that by operating at a reduced profit margin (the State butcher's shops average one-fifth of a penny profit on every pound of meat sold), the cost of goods and services provided by State-run enterprises would be reduced, and that the flow-on effect would be to reduce and stabilise prices for similar goods and services provided by the private sector. In the period 1915–1925 the Queensland Government instituted or acquired a diversity of business enterprises, including a State Insurance Office, a Public Curator's Office, the Golden Casket State Lottery, sawmills and joinery works, mining and fishing ventures (including a string of State Fish Shops), a hotel, a sugar mill, cold stores, plant nurseries, cattle stations and a network of butcher's shops, the process being formalised with the passing of the State Enterprises Act of 1918. These activities were part of a broader, pragmatic Labor platform which advocated State intervention in the private sector to protect individuals against capitalist exploitation, not as a means of involving workers in the control of production, or of raising wage levels. Labor politicians regarded State enterprise as "State capitalism" rather than "State socialism".

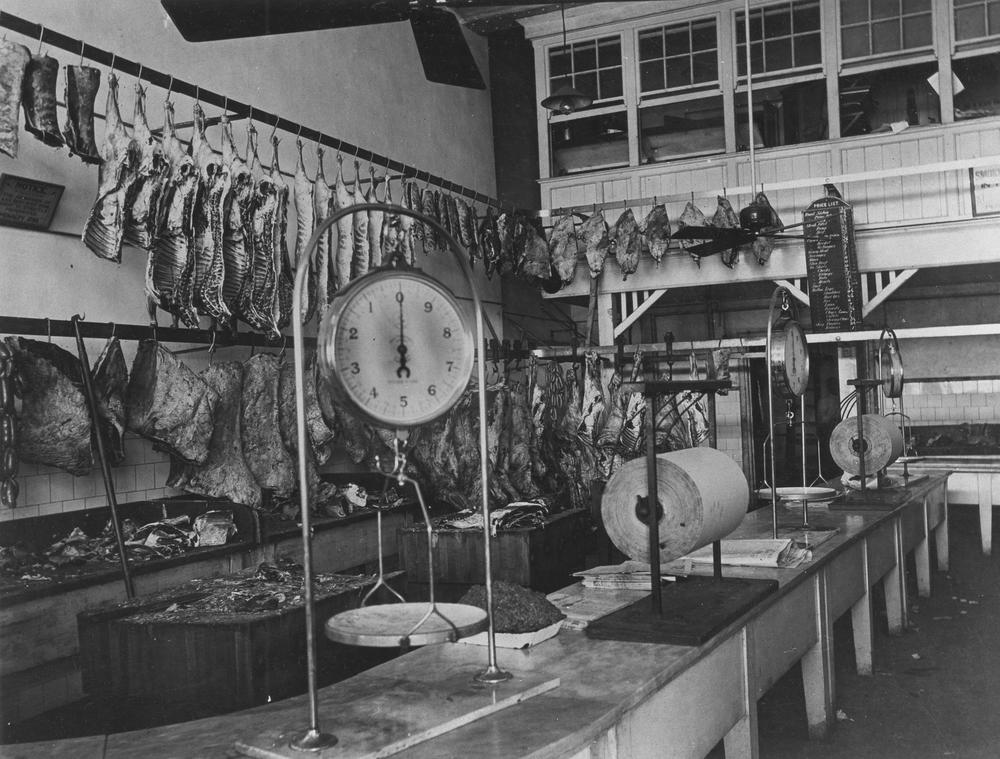
Interior of the State butchers shop in Roma Street, Brisbane, circa 1917

In 1915 cattle raising was one of the principal economic activities of the State, and meat was considered a staple food. Believing that all Queenslanders should have access to meat at fair prices, and needing to maintain a regular supply of cheap meat to the Allied fighting forces, the Ryan government introduced a Statewide system of State-owned butcher's shops which proved to be among the more successful of the numerous State enterprises. The first State butcher's shop was opened in Roma Street, Brisbane, on 12 November 1915, and soon other shops were established in Brisbane suburbs and in regional centres such as Rockhampton, Gympie, Townsville, Charters Towers, and Mount Morgan, following the railway lines via which frozen meat was distributed to the State butcheries. During the life of the scheme 90 shops were opened throughout the State.

The town of Roma was established officially in 1862 to service the Maranoa pastoral district, and as a government administrative centre. With the extension of the Western railway line to Roma and Charleville in the 1880s, linking Western Queensland to the coastal ports, Roma boomed, and emerged as an important regional centre. Roma was considered an important centre in the Statewide chain of butcher's shops established by the Labor government from 1915. It was a substantial town serving a wide pastoral and agricultural district, and functioned as an important distribution centre for meat slaughtered at the State-owned Charleville Meatworks, further west along the railway.

Toward the end of 1918 moves were made to open a State butcher's shop at Roma. In fairness to established butcheries, when the State intended to open a butcher's shop in a town or suburb, inspections were made of existing butcheries, to assess the possibility of State acquisition. At Roma, at least two butchers were keen to sell their business and/or premises, but inspection revealed that these shops were not sufficiently well-equipped, and recommendation was made to erect purpose-designed premises of the most up-to-date kind. The recommendation was accepted, but while an appropriate site for new premises was being sought, two State butcher's shops opened in Roma on 1 March 1919, in leased premises in Wyndham and Arthur Streets.

By May 1919 a vacant allotment in Arthur Street had been resumed, and an adjacent allotment was purchased subsequently from Henry Hoffman. A cottage on this second land parcel was removed to Charleville Meatworks to make room for the construction of the State butcher's shop. Plans were prepared in the office of the Queensland Government Architect. The new building was completed by late October, and opened on 18 September 1919, at which time the leased shops in Arthur and Wyndham Streets were closed. The new premises was of brick construction, and at a cost of £4,061/13/3, was one of the more expensive of the purpose-built State butcher's shops. It contained an office, shop, breaking-down room, salting-room, cold room, country order department, store, and engine-room. In 1920, just over £300 was spent on stables.

Only six purpose-designed butcher's shops were constructed in Queensland, each apparently built to an individual design: a retail butchery within the Central State Fish Market, South Brisbane (the markets were a substantial brick complex erected 1917–18 at a cost of over £45,500); Booval State Butchery (erected c. 1919 at a cost of just over £600); Roma State Butchery (brick, erected 1919 at a cost of just over £4,000 (this figure possibly includes plant)); Ayr State Butchery (brick and wood, erected c. 1920 at a cost of just over £2,000); Mackay State Butchery (fibrous-cement and wood, erected c. 1921 at a cost of just over £2,600); and Walkerston State Butchery (erected 1922–23 at a cost of about £536). Cold stores and additions were erected at various butcher's shops, but no other purpose-designed shop was constructed.

Initially the State butcher's shops were supplied with frozen meat from meatworks companies, but from 1921 they purchased their own stock which they killed at their own slaughter-yards, ensuring that the State butcher's shops were supplied always with fresh meat at very competitive prices. It has not been established whether the Roma shop continued to be supplied from Charleville Meatworks.

Despite benefits such as the provision of employment, assistance to small farmers and small business, and the provision of cheaper meat to thousands, the State Enterprises scheme proved an economic failure. Some State enterprises had been purchased at an inflated price; others were located in unsuitable areas or were badly managed; others suffered the effects of economic recession, or of the mid-1920s drought. Following the passing of the Profiteering Prevention Act of 1920, other mechanisms were in place for controlling prices. By 1926, Labor premier William McCormack had declared publicly his intention of disposing of unprofitable State Enterprises, although little action was taken at the time. Some of the State butcher shops were disposed of in the period 1926–1928 (including the Roma shop), and when Labor was defeated at the 1929 election, the in-coming Country/Progressive/Nationalist coalition government disposed of most of the remaining State Enterprises, including the 39 remaining State butcher's shops, which ceased trading as of 30 June 1929.

In their 14 years of operation, the State butcher's shops sold over £5 million worth of meat and had made an overall profit to the Treasury of £185,000, but when interest and other charges were factored in, they lost about £6,000. However, this pales by comparison with the combined £2 million loss sustained by the State stations and the State-acquired Chillagoe railway, mines and smelter.

The State butchery in Arthur Street, Roma, was sold in July 1928 to Roma butchers Dore and Donald Ltd. Edwin Arnold Donald, son of a Roma grazier, built up a successful butcher's business in Roma in the 1910s, and it appears to have been his two Roma shops which were leased briefly by the State Butcheries Department in 1919.

The original street awning supported on timber posts has been replaced with a cantilevered awning, and the shop front has been modernised. A small office, where customers paid for their meat, was removed when the front section of the shop was refurbished c. 1999.

In 2016, the former Roma State Butcher's Shop remains a privately owned butchery (Ladbrook's Butchery).

== Description ==
The former Roma State Butcher's Shop is located in Arthur Street, Roma, in the town centre, south of the intersection with McDowall Street.

It a rectangular, single-storeyed brick building with a gabled roof to the front (east) elevation and hipped gablet roof to the rear (west) elevation. There is a hipped roof wing on the south side. All roofs are covered in corrugated iron. To the rear of the wing is a modern car/van port structure. The front (east) elevation has a decorative gable comprising evenly spaced vertical painted timbers on plaster. Centrally placed in the gable is a timber louvred ventilation panel. There is a cantilevered awning, with a cloth "Dutch style" blind on the south side, beneath which is a modern aluminium shopfront.

To the south side there are two original high level windows, now blocked-in. The hipped roof wing, originally open, is now partly built in by a brick wall with a window, with the remainder enclosed in vertical metal sheeting. There is a decorative timber trellis screen fence to the street (east) elevation of the wing. The van/car port is a flat roof metal structure with vertical metal cladding to the south side. In the wall beneath this structure there is a timber door with a skylight over, either side of which are 4:4 pane timber vertical sash windows. To the rear (north) elevation there is a timber lean-to structure clad in weatherboarding, with a centrally placed opening. The rear brick wall of the building is painted with a centrally placed door. In the west side wall there are 3 closely spaced 4:4 pane timber vertical sash windows at the northern end, a door, and two original high level windows, now blocked in, at the southern end. The external brickwork is a combination of stretcher bond to the front and sides of the building, indicating cavity construction, and English bond to the rear, indicating solid wall construction.

Internally there is an L-shaped shop area with modern counters. There is a door from this area into a large cold room store on the north side and a door into the meat preparation area. Beyond the preparation area is a store/staff room area.

The c. 1920 stables do not survive. There is a small detached toilet block to the northeast corner of the building, but no other structures. The south side of the site has an access road leading to parking at the rear. There is a car width access way along the north side.

== Heritage listing ==
The former State Butchers Shop was listed on the Queensland Heritage Register on 27 April 2001 having satisfied the following criteria.

The place is important in demonstrating the evolution or pattern of Queensland's history.

The Former State Butcher's Shop, Roma, erected in 1919, is important in illustrating the pattern of Queensland's history. In particular, the place is illustrative of the highly co-ordinated, statewide system of State butcheries which provided cheaper meat to thousands of Queensland families in the years 1915–1929. During this period successive Queensland Labor governments established various State enterprises, with the network of State butcher's shops being among the more successful of these experiments. The Roma State Butcher's Shop was considered an important distribution centre for meat supplied from the State-owned Charleville Meatworks, which is illustrated in the construction of a substantial brick building with state-of-the-art butchery equipment and facilities.

The place demonstrates rare, uncommon or endangered aspects of Queensland's cultural heritage.

The Roma shop was one of only six purpose-designed State butcher's shops constructed 1917–1923 – most of the State butcher's shops operated from leased or purchased premises - and was among the more substantial (full brick construction) of these.

The place is important in demonstrating the principal characteristics of a particular class of cultural places.

The place has remained a butcher's shop, and is important in illustrating the principal characteristics of a purpose-designed State butcher's shop of its era.

== See also ==
- List of butcher shops
- List of oldest companies in Australia
