= Victor Churchill =

Australian butcher shop

- Type: Private
- Industry: Butchery
- Founded: 1876; 150 years ago
- Founder: Victor Churchill
- Headquarters: Woollahra, New South Wales, Australia
- Key people: Anthony Puharich
- Products: Meat, charcuterie, pâtés, terrines, sauces and marinades
- Parent: Vic's Meat
- Website: Official website

Victor Churchill is an Australian butcher. It was founded in 1876 in Woollahra, New South Wales by Victor Churchill and is Australia’s oldest continually run butcher shop.

The store became known for its high-end interior design, bespoke service model and theatrical presentation of meat, charcuterie and prepared products. Its Woollahra redesign won an International Retail Design award in New York, and Anthony Bourdain described it as "the most beautiful butcher shop in the world". Victor Churchill later expanded to Melbourne, opening in Armadale in 2021, with a further steak restaurant and bar planned for Crown Melbourne in 2027.

== History ==
Victor Churchill occupies a Woollahra site associated with butchery since 1876, while its present luxury retail format was opened by Anthony Puharich in 2009. The business was developed by the father-and-son team Victor and Anthony Puharich, who had started a butchery business in eastern Sydney in 1996.

Anthony Puharich came from a family with a long involvement in butchery. His father Victor had worked as a butcher after migrating to Australia from what was then Yugoslavia, now Croatia. Anthony studied finance and economics at Bond University and worked as an equity analyst at Bankers Trust before persuading his father to enter business with him. Their first shop, opened on Oxford Street in Darlinghurst in 1996, struggled as a retail operation, leading Anthony Puharich to seek wholesale customers among nearby restaurants. Within about a year, the company had begun supplying restaurants including Level 41, Tetsuya and Buon Ricordo, and in 1998, the Puharich family bought a factory in Mascot.

In 2005, Puharich expanded outside Australia by opening facilities near Shanghai and in Singapore, but the overseas ventures were closed by 2008. After that setback, he opened Victor Churchill in Woollahra during the global financial crisis, investing about $2.5 million in the shop's fit-out. The store exceeded his early sales expectations in its first week and later became the best-known retail expression of the wider Vic's Meat business.

== Retail concept and design ==
Victor Churchill was conceived as a high-end butcher shop intended to challenge conventional expectations of meat retailing. The Woollahra store uses full-length glass display cabinets and presents premium meat, house-made pâtés, terrines, sauces and marinades in a setting closer to luxury retail than a traditional butcher shop. Its interior includes decorative elements such as sausage-shaped door handles, mirrored cabinets, a glass dry-ageing room and a wall of backlit Himalayan salt bricks.

The redesign of the Woollahra store won an International Retail Design award in New York. Anthony Bourdain later described Victor Churchill as "the most beautiful butcher shop in the world", a description that became closely associated with the brand.

The store's service model places butchers in view of customers and emphasizes custom cutting, customer interaction and a bespoke retail experience. Broadsheet described the shop as designed to turn meat shopping into an experience rather than a routine transaction.

== Vic's Meat and restaurant supply ==
Victor Churchill is part of Anthony Puharich's broader meat business, Vic's Meat, which operates from a 3,500-square-metre facility in Mascot, Sydney. The Mascot operation was refurbished in 2014 at a cost of about $19 million and uses equipment including portioning machinery, conveyor systems, digital tagging and computerised cutting instructions. The facility processes beef, pork, lamb, poultry and game, and uses digital tracking to connect meat with its farm of origin and restaurant destination.

Vic's Meat supplies restaurants including Quay, Aria, Sepia, Marque and Movida. The Australian Financial Review also reported that Vic's Meat was a primary butcher for major restaurant groups and supplied independent restaurants including Brae and Attica. Puharich's dry-ageing program has been linked by the Australian Financial Review to dishes served at restaurants including Bennelong and Firedoor.

By 2019, Puharich said the wider company had an annual turnover of about $90 million and that he wanted retail and wholesale activity to be evenly balanced by 2025. The company had also begun shifting toward online retail, with plans to ship chilled meat to home customers using packaging designed for that purpose. Anthony Puharich later said that online sales had been accelerated so that Victor Churchill products could be sold beyond the physical store.

== Expansion ==
Victor Churchill gained wider public attention through Anthony Bourdain, who visited the Woollahra store during a Sydney trip in 2012 and later featured it on No Reservations. Puharich considered expanding Victor Churchill to New York after Bourdain proposed including the butcher in a planned New York food market. Bourdain's market project did not proceed, and Puharich later explored a separate New York opening with contacts introduced through Bourdain. After Bourdain's death in 2018, Puharich abandoned the New York plan, saying the project no longer felt right without Bourdain's involvement.

After shelving the New York project, Puharich shifted his expansion plans to Melbourne. The company opened Victor Churchill Armadale in 2021 as a retail space, restaurant and bar.

The Crown Melbourne project was planned as a steak restaurant and bar rather than only a butcher shop. The venue was expected to include a 120-seat dining room and a 60- to 80-seat bar, with a dedicated entrance in Crown Towers and views across the river and skyline. Puharich was working with the New York design studio Avroko on the fit-out.

Monty Koludrovic was appointed head of culinary for the Crown Melbourne project. Koludrovic, originally from Byron Bay, had worked at Sydney's Icebergs and later in Los Angeles, including as culinary director at the private members' club Living Room.

== Media profile ==
Bourdain wrote the foreword to Anthony Puharich's book Meat, which covered meat preparation and recipes.

Puharich developed a media presence alongside the retail and wholesale business. His activities included a podcast, a television series made for Foxtel and later shown on SBS, and writing for food magazines including Gourmet Traveller and delicious. He also launched a cooking app in 2009 that calculated cooking times for meat.

== See also ==
- List of butcher shops
- List of oldest companies in Australia
