= C Lidgate =

Butchers shop in Holland Park, London, England

Coordinates: 51.506780°N 0.207369°W

- Industry: Butchers
- Founded: London (1850)
- Founder: Charles Lidgate
- Headquarters: London, United Kingdom
- Number of locations: Holland Park
- Website: lidgates.com

C Lidgate is a butchers shop in Holland Park, London. It was founded in 1850 by Charles Lidgate and remains in the hands of his descendants today.

== History ==
Charles Lidgate founded C Lidgate in 1850 at 110 Holland Park Avenue. It is currently run by the fifth generation of the Lidgate family, Danny Lidgate, who recently took over from his father David Lidgate. David inherited the business in 1959 at the age of 19 when his father died.

In 2012, the store twice appeared on Gordon Ramsay's Ultimate Cookery Course on Channel 4. Fifth generation employee Danny Lidgate explained to chef Gordon Ramsay in one episode about poultry and then later in the series about pork and beef. The shop has also appeared on Gordon Ramsay's Christmas Cookalong and the Alan Titchmarsh Show. Following the 2013 meat adulteration scandal, sales of pies and minced beef were reported to have increased by 10%. An increase in the sales of rabbit was noted during the previous year which was up some 20% from the year prior to that.

As well as Gordon Ramsay, other celebrity chefs have stated that Lidgate's is a favourite. These include Mark Hix of Hix Oyster and Chop House, Fergus Henderson of St. John restaurant, Tom Aikens, and Nigella Lawson. Other non-chef celebrities who have noted Lidgate's include Cerys Matthews and Richard Branson. The products on sale include meat from the Highgrove Estate, owned by Prince Charles and scotch eggs made in-house from quail's eggs and cumberland sausage.

== Reception ==
Tania Ballantine at Time Out named C Lidgate as one of the best butchers in London and recommended them following the 2013 meat adulteration scandal. In a similar article in the Evening Standard, the shop was named one of the ten best in London. The Independent named C Lidgate as one of the top fifty food shops in London.

The store has won a variety of Great Taste Awards. These include a three star award for Wagyu sirloin steak in 2012, four two star awards and four one star awards.

== See also ==
- List of butcher shops
