= Allens of Mayfair =

London's oldest butchers shop

Coordinates: 51.51002°N 0.14874°W

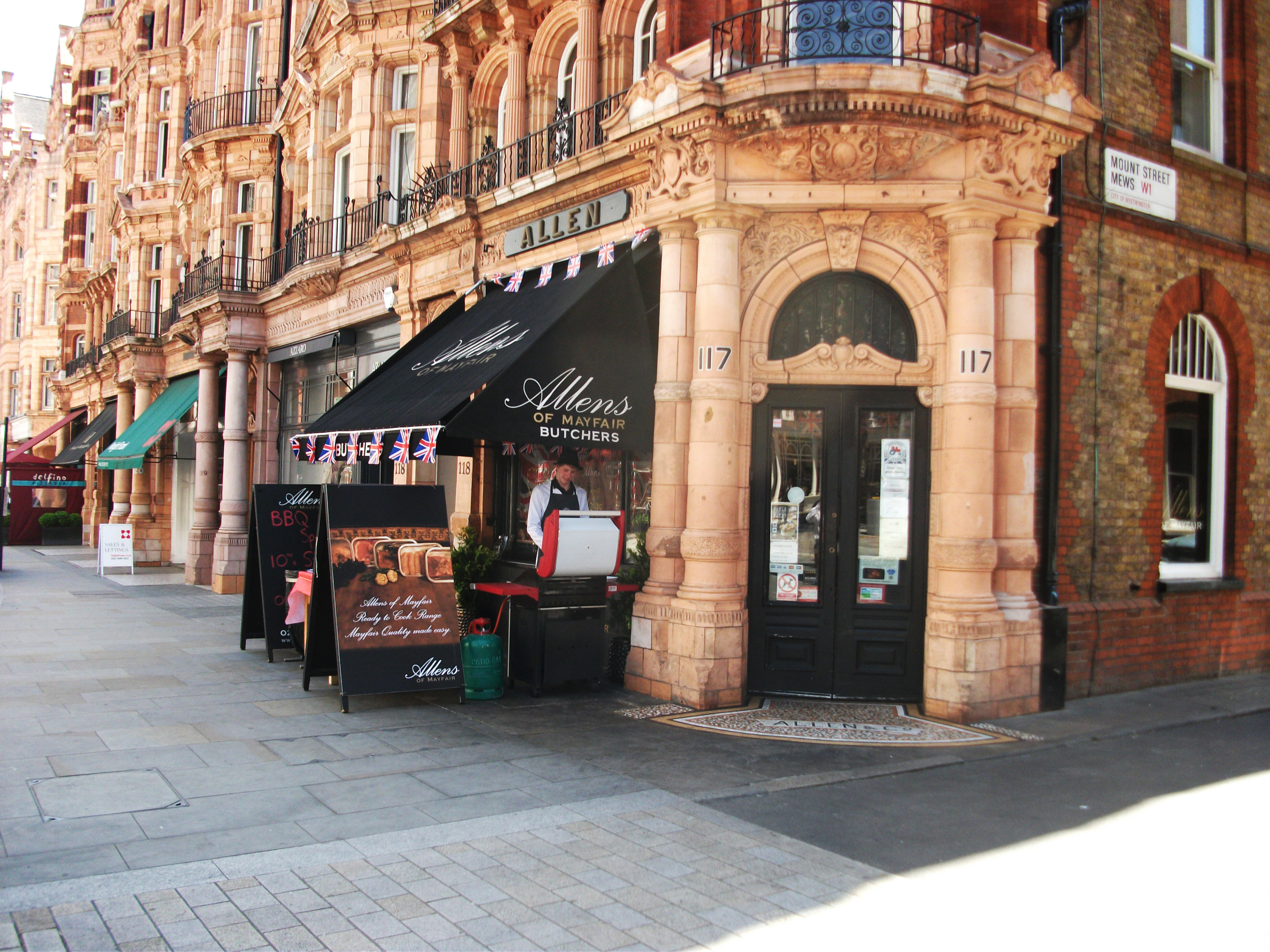
Allens of Mayfair butchers shop a few years before it closed its doors.

Allens of Mayfair was a butchers shop based in London. It opened in Mayfair in 1830 and closed in 2015. Allens Scottish beef was bred especially for them in the Cairngorm National Park. The shop ran butchery classes between 2007 and its closure.

== History ==
Allens was opened in South Audley Street in 1830, and moved to its final location on Mount Street in 1880. It was London's oldest butchers shop to date. It was one of only four shops that the Duke of Westminster officially mandated. By May 2006, Allens was taken over by the owners of Rare Butchers of Distinction. Over £1 million was spent in refurbishing the Grade II listed building, and installing new modern equipment inside the shop and attached office. In 2008 Allens bought Simply Real Sausages, which supply many of London's top kitchens, including The Dorchester and the Soho House group.

The landlord, Grosvenor Estate, said that the management had 'fallen into administration' and that the court's administrator had not renewed the lease.

Allens Scottish beef was bred especially for them in the Cairngorm National Park. Butchery classes were held weekly since 2007.

== Products and services ==
Allens Scottish beef was bred especially for them in the Cairngorm National Park. All of the pork, beef, lamb, geese and turkey sold came from farms in the UK, and all meat sold could be traced back to the farm.

Butchery classes were held weekly around the hexagonal butchers block in the middle of the shop. Introduced in 2007, they were designed to prevent butchery becoming a thing of the past. Allens' butchery classes achieved number 60 on GQ magazine's "100 Best Things in the World" in December 2009.

== See also ==
- List of butcher shops
