= Beast and Cleaver =

Butcher shop and restaurant in Seattle, Washington, U.S.

- Interactive map of Beast and Cleaver

Restaurant information
- Location: 2362 NW 80th Street, Seattle, King, Washington, 98117, United States
- Coordinates: 47°41′13″N 122°23′13.5″W

Beast and Cleaver is a butcher shop and restaurant in Seattle's Ballard neighborhood, in the U.S. state of Washington.

== History ==
After funds were raised via Indiegogo, owners opened Beast and Cleaver on New Year's Eve in 2019. Kevin Smith is a co-owner.

The business experienced an upsurge in early March 2020, during the start of the COVID-19 pandemic. Beast and Cleaver has hosted small dinners on weekends under the moniker 'Peasant'.

== Reception ==
Aimee Rizzo of The Infatuation wrote, "Eating here feels like sneaking into a museum to have a sleepover, only the display cases here showcase your prospective dinner instead of fossilized pterodactyl tracks." Jade Yamazaki Stewart included the restaurant in Eater Seattle's 2022 list of 18 "restaurants that make Ballard one of Seattle's best dining neighborhoods". The website's Gabe Guarente and Megan Hill included Beast and Cleaver in a 2022 overview of "where to get great steak in Seattle". The business was also included in Eater Seattle's 2022 list of "the 38 essential restaurants in Seattle". Allecia Vermillion included Beast and Cleaver in Seattle Metropolitan's 2022 "guide to Seattle's best butcher shops and meat markets".

== See also ==
- List of butcher shops
