= Michael Kirk (butcher) =

Family firm of butchers in Wolverhampton, England

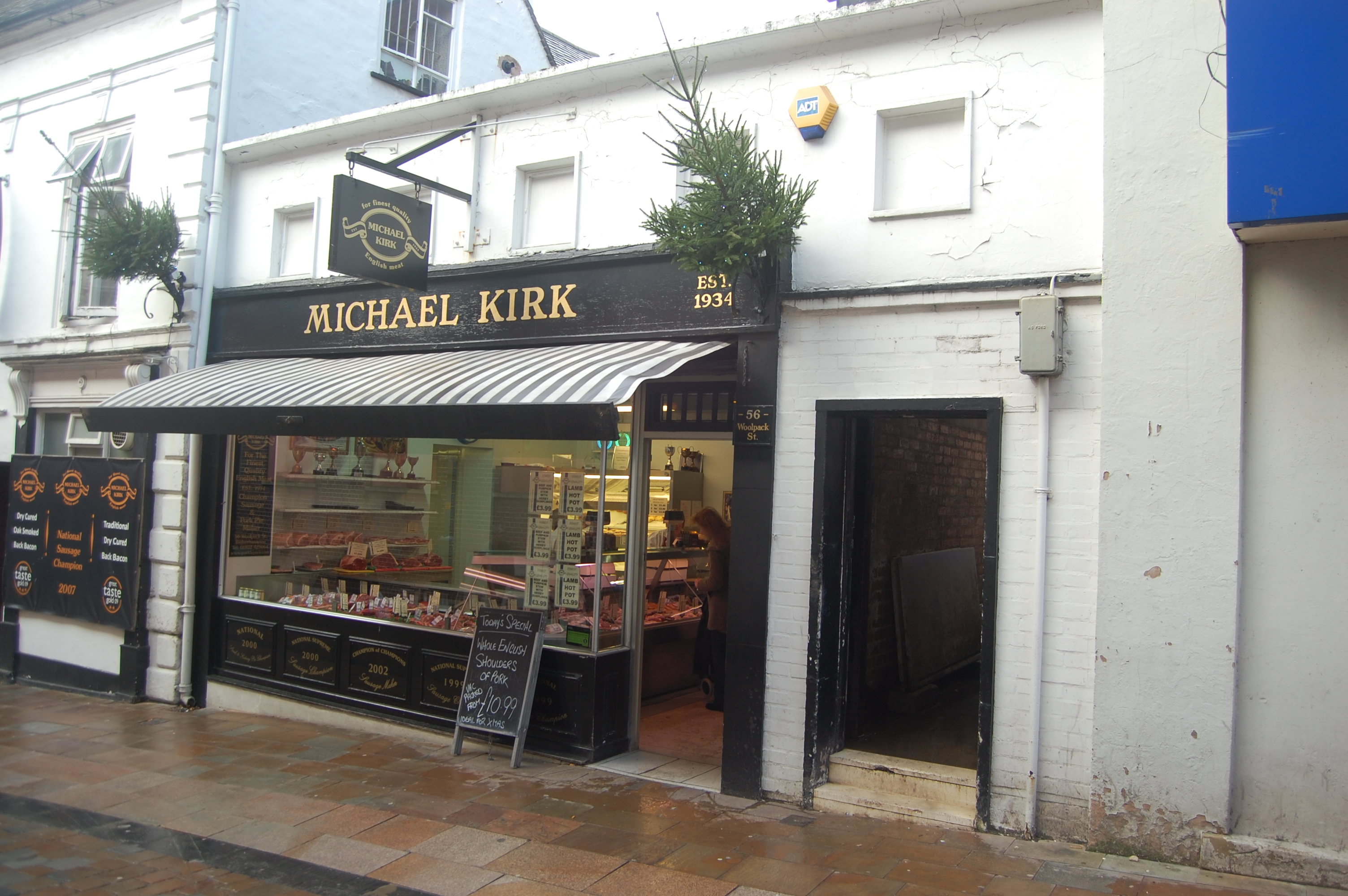
- The shop in November 2013, with Christmas trees displayed
- Type: Butcher
- Founded: 1934
- Headquarters: 56, Woolpack Street, Wolverhampton; 52.585380°N 2.127802°W, England
- Products: Pork pies; Sausages
- Website: porkiepies.com

Michael Kirk is a small family firm of butchers in Wolverhampton, England, established in 1934, which has won several prizes for their pies, including National Pork Pie Champion, 2005, and for their sausages.

Owner Michael Bachyk says of his pork pies:

I base my recipe on the traditional Melton Mowbray-style pie, which doesn't use cured meat like most Yorkshire pies... You wouldn't roast pork and expect it to come out pink, and mine looks much more like roast pork, a greyish colour. But it's all down to personal taste. That's just how we like them here.

== See also ==
- List of butcher shops
