= Ginger Pig =

British butchery chain

Coordinates: 51.5023°N 0.2425°W

The branch in Shepherd's Bush

Ginger Pig is a butchery which used to raise livestock in the Vale of Pickering and North York Moors and retail the meat in its shops in London and supplies restaurants and other specialist butchers. It was founded by Tim Wilson in 2003. A series of Ginger Pig cookbooks based upon their produce was released in 2013.

== History ==
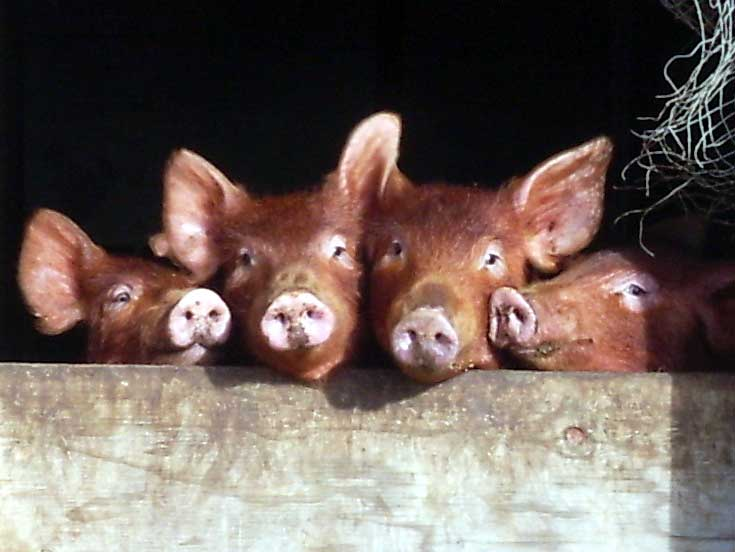
The gingery bristles of the Tamworth breed give the enterprise its name

Tim Wilson came from a farming background but initially dealt in antiques and property development. He acquired an old farm in Nottinghamshire and kept three saddleback pigs there to make good use of the pigsty. When they were grown and slaughtered, he bought three gilt Tamworth sows, Milli, Molly and Mandy and a Tamworth boar named Dai Bando. These bred quickly and so he soon had an abundance of pork. He learnt how to make sausages and, in 1998, his friend Anne Wilson started a stall at the Borough Market selling his sausages. The stall was successful and became a permanent outlet. Chef Paul Hughes then joined the business, bringing expertise in charcuterie and, together, they opened a butcher's shop in the Marylebone district of London. The business continued to prosper and in 2012 had grown to three farms, five shops and a series of cookery books.

== See also ==
- List of butcher shops

== Bibliography ==
- Ginger Pig Meat Book - Fran Warde and Tim Wilson (Mitchell Beazley, 2011) ISBN 9781845335588
- Ginger Pig Farmhouse Cookbook - Fran Warde and Tim Wilson (Mitchell Beazley, 2013) ISBN 9781845337247
