= Jack O'Shea's =

Coordinates: 50.8462°N 4.3892°E

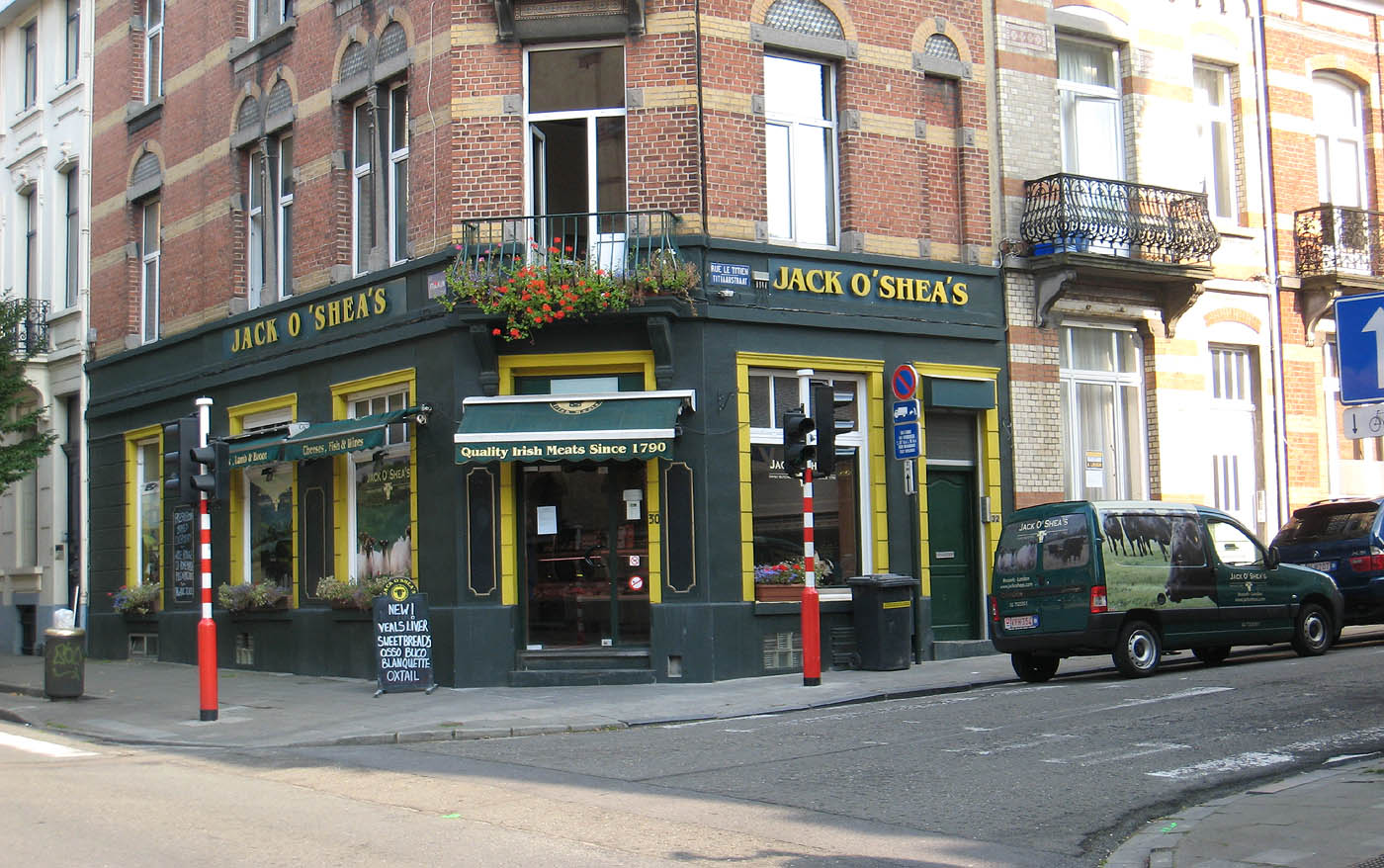
Jack O'Shea's, Brussels

Jack O'Shea's is an Irish butcher located in London, selling organic fresh meat. The chain was formerly located in Selfridges, but had its contract terminated in 2012 after breaking the store's ethical code on selling foie gras.

== History ==
Jack O'Shea (born Cathal O'Shea) is descended from eight generations of Irish butchers, but could not find an outlet to sell high-quality produce. In 1998, he opened his own butcher's shop in Brussels. In 2006, he opened a second shop in Knightsbridge, London, run by his brother and co-owner Darragh O'Shea.

Both sell high-quality meat, including grass-fed Black Angus beef from farms and abattoirs in southwest Ireland and have been listed 3rd in The Guardian's top ten meat suppliers. Jack O'Shea has also appeared in Hello!, GQ, The Observer and The Telegraph Magazine

== Controversy ==
In November 2008, O'Shea's opened a counter in Selfridges food hall, on Oxford Street. In 2009, former James Bond star Sir Roger Moore led a campaign to stop Selfridges selling foie gras, the French delicacy created by force-feeding geese enriched corn meal. In the run-up to Christmas 2011, a customer spotted the O'Shea's counter in Selfridges selling foie gras. Investigated by the Evening Standard, it exposed that if a customer approached the O'Shea's counter and asked for "French fillet", then 750g packets of foie gras were supplied at a cost of £39.40. The counter was closed from O'Shea's ejection, and the contract terminated for failing "to adhere to exacting best practice standards in hygiene and food safety".

== Awards ==
- 2009 The Independent's Butcher of the year.

== See also ==
- List of butcher shops
