= R J Balson & Son =

Butcher in Dorset, England

Coordinates: 50.73427°N 2.76348°W

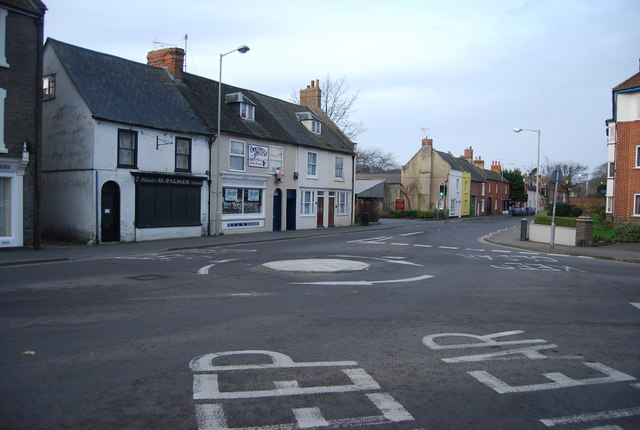
Butchers premises in Bridport seen from across the road

R J Balson & Son is a high-street butcher in the market town of Bridport, Dorset. According to the Institute for Family Business, it is the oldest continuously trading family business in the United Kingdom. It has been in the Balson family since 1515 when Robert Balson rented a market stall on Bridport Shambles.

Since 1892 its butcher's shop has been located at 9 West Allington, Bridport, not far from its original location.

It was featured in the BBC Four television programme Hidden Histories: Britain’s Oldest Family Businesses, broadcast on 15 January 2014.

In September 2015, the business celebrated its 500th anniversary and in 2025, its 510th anniversary.

== See also ==
- List of butcher shops
