= Kesäkeitto =

Finnish traditional soup

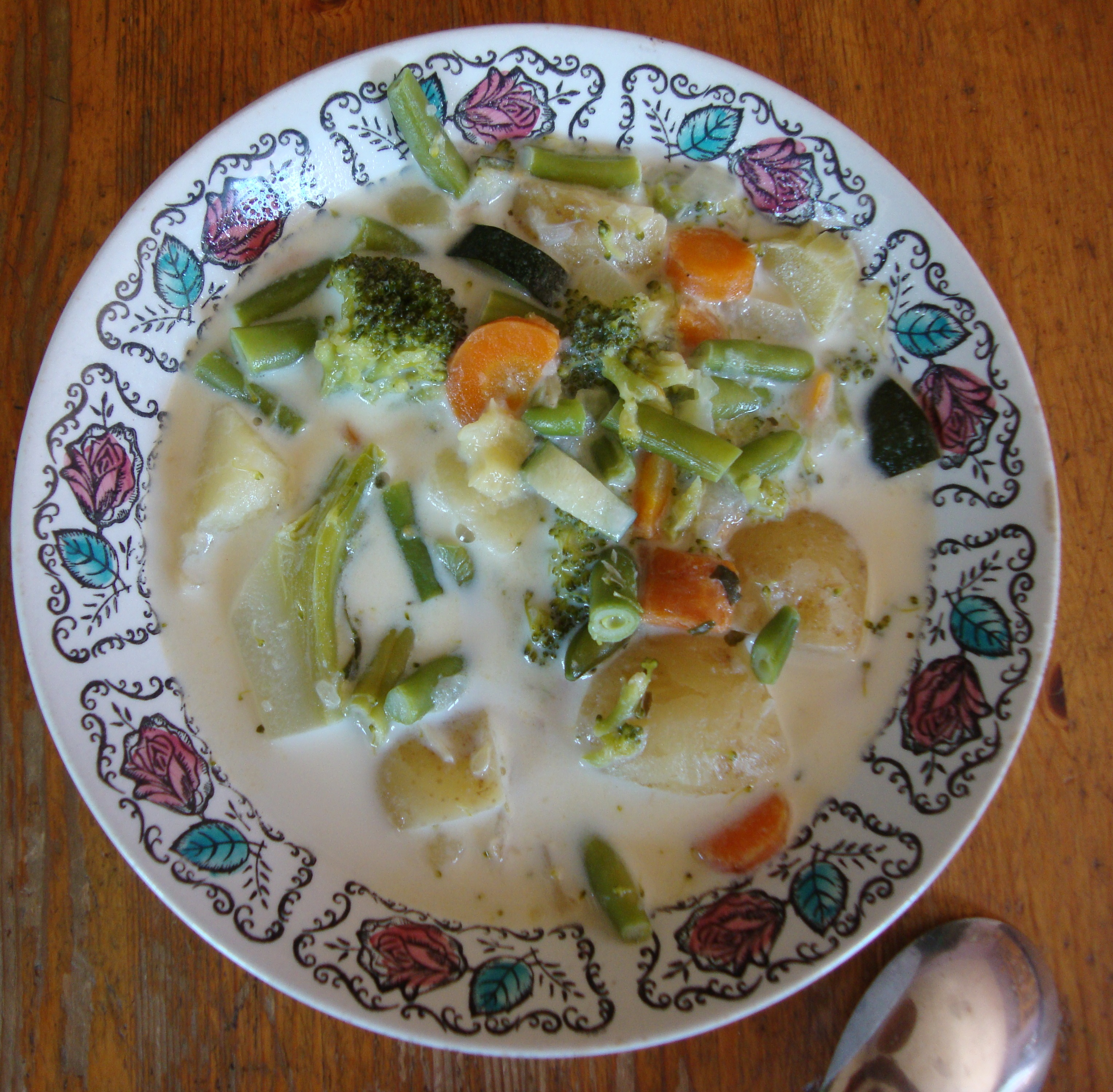
A bowl of kesäkeitto

Kesäkeitto (Finnish: [ˈkesæˌkei̯t̪ːo]; lit. 'summer soup') is a traditional vegetable soup in Finnish cuisine cooked in milk with butter, potatoes, carrots, peas, cauliflower and possibly other vegetables of the season. During the wars in the 1940s, summer soup was very popular in Finland because the availability of many foods was inconsistent, it was satisfying, and it could be made with ingredients from the garden. For this reason, the Finno-Swedes called it snålsoppa (snål means "stingy").

== See also ==
- List of soups
- Mykyrokka

== Sources ==
- Tero Kallio, Kimmo Saira: Simply Scandinavian: Travelling in Time with Finnish Cuisine and Nature. Raikas Publishing Ltd., 2009. ISBN 9529996217
