= Old Butcher's Shop, Childers =

Old Butcher's shop, Childers
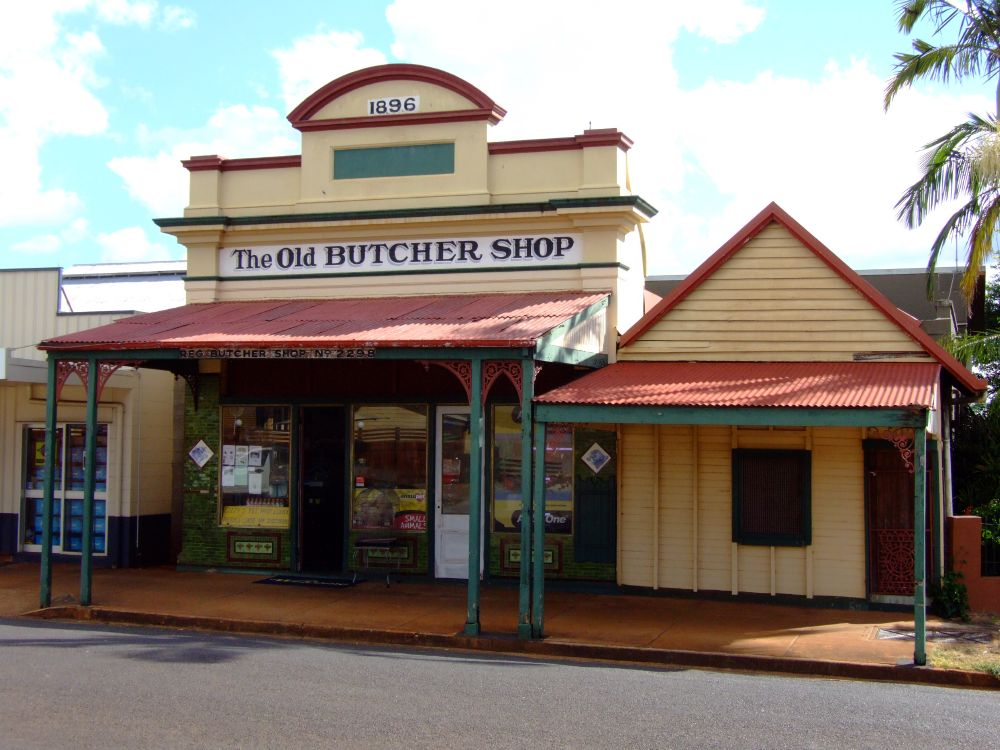
- Old Butcher's Shop, 2008

- Location within Queensland Location within Australia
- 25.2359°S 152.277°E
- Location: 6 North Street, Childers, Bundaberg Region, Queensland, Australia

History
- Design period: 1870s–1890s (late 19th century)
- Built: c. 1896–c. 1902

Queensland Heritage Register
- Official name: The Old Butcher's shop complex, HR Lassig butchers, Leatherarts, Wrench and Thompson butchers
- Type: state heritage (built)
- Designated: 21 October 1992
- Reference no.: 600631
- Significant period: 1890s, 1900s (fabric) c. 1896–1960s (historical use as a butchers)
- Significant components: furniture/fittings, residential accommodation – housing, shop/s

The Old Butcher's shop is a heritage-listed former butcher shop at 6 North Street, Childers, Bundaberg Region, Queensland, Australia. It was built from c. 1896 to c. 1902. It is also known as HR Lassig butchers, Leatherarts, and Wrench and Thompson butchers. It was added to the Queensland Heritage Register on 21 October 1992.

== History ==
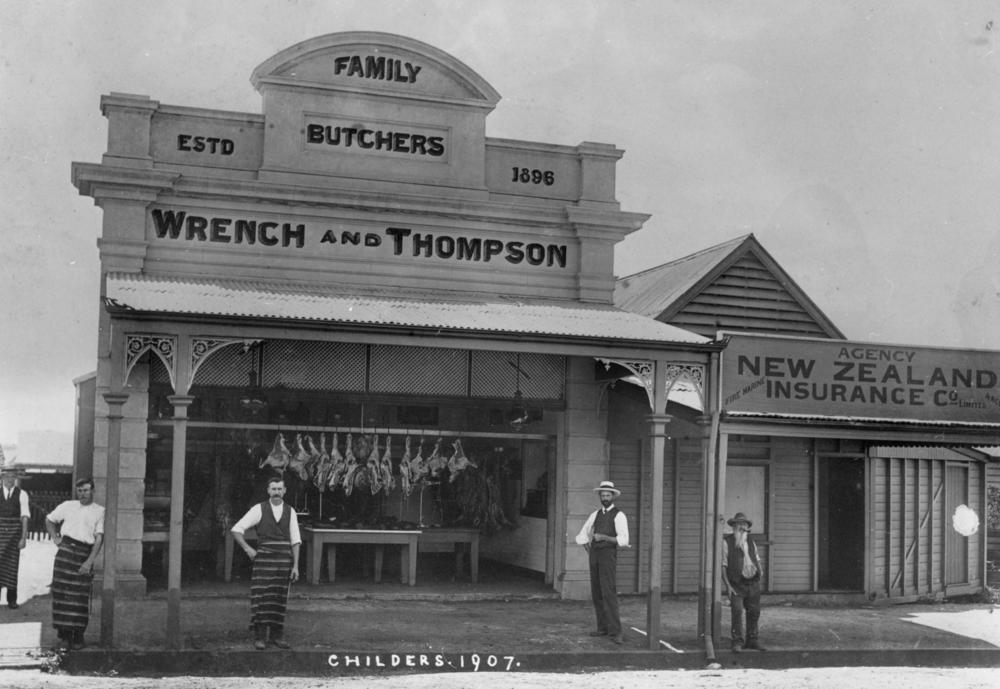
Wrench and Thompson butchers shop in Childers, 1907

The Old Butcher's Shop is located just off the main street of Childers and near to the Federal Hotel. The complex includes the former brick butcher's shop, an adjoining timber shop and a dwelling act the rear. It served several generations in Childers as a butcher's shop.

Following logging of the dense Isis Scrub in the 1870s, Childers, in the heart of the scrub, was promoted in the 1880s by Maryborough interests, as an agricultural district. The land in the immediate vicinity of the present town of Childers was surveyed in 1882 into 50 acres (20 ha) farm blocks. There was no official town survey and Childers developed following private subdivision of land at the railhead of the 1887 Isis railway line from Isis Junction. This was opened on 31 October 1887 and was intended principally to facilitate the transport of timber from the scrub.

The coming of the railway not only promoted the development of the town of Childers; it also proved the catalyst for the establishment of a sugar industry in the district in the late 1880s. At the opening of the railway to Childers, Robert Cran, owner of Maryborough's Yengarie mill, announced that he would erect a double crushing juice mill at Doolbi, to supply his mill at Yengarie. This was completed in 1890, with the juice being brought in railway tankers from the Isis district. Further expansion of the sugar industry in the Isis was closely related to the activities of the Colonial Sugar Refining Company, which erected a central crushing mill in the district 1893–94, and began crushing in 1895. By 1895, at least three other mills had been established in the Isis, with another two under construction, and Childers had emerged as the flourishing centre of a substantial sugar-growing district.

The land on which the shops are situated was originally granted as a selection to Ernest Dyne but changed hands before being extensively subdivided into town lots in 1892. William Ashby, a hotelier, bought subdivisions 1 and 3. It is not known if he built on this land and subdivided and sold the section on which the butchers shop stands in 1905, before building the Federal Hotel on the corner of Churchill and North Streets in 1907. This area of North Street appears to have developed as an offshoot of the nearby shopping area in the main street and was no doubt assisted by the presence of the hotel. The facade of the Old Butcher's shop bears the date "1896" which may refer to the establishment of either a butchery on this site, or of the establishment in trade of the proprietor. Given the similarities between this building and those erected in the main street after the 1902 fire, the building may well have been built during this era of reconstruction in the town rather than in 1896. although the timber building adjoining it may well have been an earlier butcher.

In 1905 the property was transferred to Eliza Wrench, wife of Robert Wrench who is listed in the Post Office Directory as manager of Childers Cash Butchery, although a 1907 photograph of the shop shows the name of the proprietors as Wrench and Thompson. Wrench had been a butcher in Childers since 1896, though by 1907 he was also acting as an insurance agent and may have run the New Zealand Insurance agency in the timber building. He eventually worked only as an insurance and commission agent and valuer. The land was divided into two and that with the butcher shop complex was sold in 1911 to Hermann Lassig, also a butcher. His change to the signage of the building consisted simply of substituting his name for that of Wrench & Thompson and removing the New Zealand Insurance hoarding. The front of the shop in this and the earlier photograph show an open front to the shop. It is not known when the closed and tiled shopfront was installed.

In 1915 the property was purchased by Daniel and Peter O'Regan, Daniel having been a butcher in Childers since at least 1900. In 1921 it was bought by the partnership of Robert Gant, William Branch, Richard Webb and William Webb and also run as a butchery. In 1928 it was purchased by Alexander Adie, Chairman of the Board of Directors of the Isis Central Sugar Mill, who was to own five butchers shops. Adie died in 1940 and in 1944 the business became Stehbens Bros butchers, then Frank Slack, Butcher, before becoming Kings Meats Pty Ltd in 1962. Mr King was the last butcher to operate from the shop after a continuity of use that lasted over 60 years.

The shop is said to have been used as an iceworks and was empty for some time before being purchased in 1976 by Leonard and Cheryl Derley who used it to establish a leathergoods and pottery business and several government agencies. The shop was bought in 1988 by Anita Campden-Main who opened it as a museum and tourist attraction. The property was sold in 1996.

== Description ==
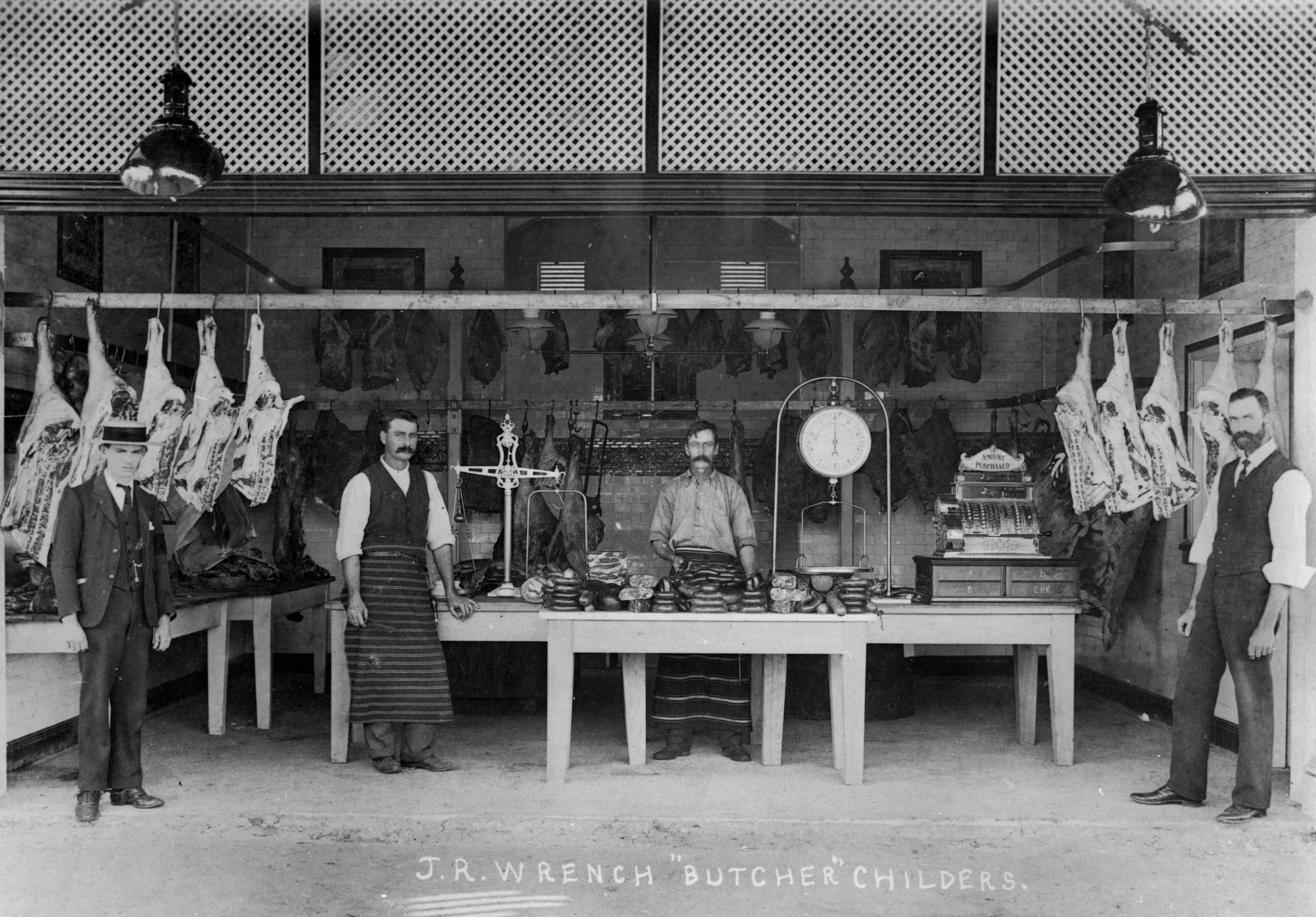
Interior of J.R. Wrench the butcher, circa 1926

The old Butcher's shop complex is located in North Street a short distance from Churchill Street and the Federal Hotel. The site comprises masonry butchers shop and adjoining timber shop with a dwelling at the rear.

The main shop is constructed of brick and is a rectangular building with its long axis at right angles to the street. It has a gabled roof clad with corrugated iron and concealed by a parapet featuring a raised central section with an arched top, similar to shops in Churchill street. The shopfront is divided into two tenancies and has large display windows between and flanking the two panelled doors. It is shaded by an awning supported on two pairs of posts and is tiled at street level. The tiles are a glossy moss green with panels of geometric and stylised floral tiles in reds and greens beneath each window. Beside the windows at each side of the shop front are inset white feature tiles painted with the images of a bull and a ram in blue.

The adjoining shop is a simple timber building with an exposed stud frame and corrugated iron gabled roof. It also has a corrugated iron street awning which is supported on plain timber posts. Behind the shop is a timber dwelling which was not inspected. The butcher's shop includes fittings and furniture from its use as a butcher.

== Heritage listing ==
The Old Butcher's shop was listed on the Queensland Heritage Register on 21 October 1992 having satisfied the following criteria.

The place is important in demonstrating the evolution or pattern of Queensland's history.

As a handsome masonry commercial building in the commercial centre of Childers, the shop illustrates the change which took place in many Queensland towns as the simple timber and corrugated iron buildings of frontier settlement were replaced by more sophisticated premises as towns became stable and prosperous. The timber shop which adjoins it underlines this contrast. It is also an example of the fashion for building in brick in many country towns following the terrible fires which devastated commercial centres during the "King" drought of the early 1900s, caused by a combination of closely built timber structures and a water supply insufficient for fire-fighting.

The place has potential to yield information that will contribute to an understanding of Queensland's history.

It contains much of its original equipment which has the potential to provide information on the way in which meat was processed for public sale and the equipment available to butchers, such as sausage machines, brine pumps, presses and mincers.

The place is important in demonstrating the principal characteristics of a particular class of cultural places.

The old Butcher's Shop complex in Childers is an exceptionally good and intact example of this kind of premises.

The place is important because of its aesthetic significance.

The shops, particularly the masonry butcher's shop, which is constructed in a style similar to the rows of shops in Churchill Street, make a major contribution to the character of the streetscape of Childers.

== See also ==
- List of butcher shops
- List of oldest companies in Australia
