= Reid's Butcher Shop =

Reids Butcher shop
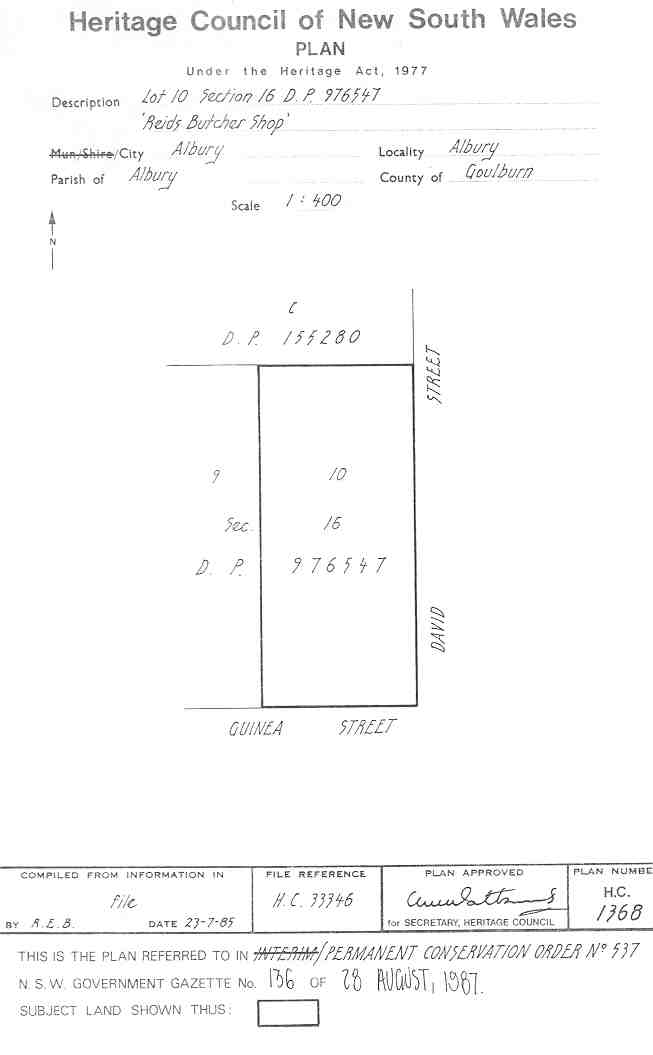
- Heritage boundaries

- Location within New South Wales Location within Australia
- 36.0745°S 146.9214°E
- Location: 462 Guinea Street, Albury, City of Albury, New South Wales, Australia

Site notes
- Owner: John and Margaret-Anne Baker

New South Wales Heritage Register
- Official name: Reids Butcher shop & dwelling
- Type: state heritage (built)
- Designated: 2 April 1999
- Reference no.: 537
- Type: historic site

Reid's Butcher Shop is a heritage-listed former shop at 462 Guinea Street, Albury, City of Albury, New South Wales, Australia. The property is owned by John and Margaret-Anne Baker. It was added to the New South Wales State Heritage Register on 2 April 1999.

== History ==
The building dates from the 1870s. It remained a butcher's shop until 1962.

It underwent major renovations in the late 2000s, funded by Heritage New South Wales in conjunction with private funding.

== Description ==
It is a Victorian-era corner shop and residence with a verandah that extends to the kerb.

== Heritage listing ==
Reid's Butcher Shop was listed on the New South Wales State Heritage Register on 2 April 1999.

== See also ==
- List of butcher shops
- List of oldest companies in Australia
