= Curt's Famous Meats =

Meat market in Independence, Missouri

Coordinates: 39.0951°N 94.4583°W

Curt's Famous Meats storefront

Curt's Famous Meats (also known as Curt's Meat Market or shortened to Curt's) is a meat market located on East Truman Road in Independence, Missouri. Although it is in Independence, they are a known part of Kansas City-style barbecue history. Their products have won over 35 local and national barbecue awards, including their eight American Royal wins. They serve a variety of meats, ranging from common livestock and poultry to seafood and even frog legs. They also act as a small retail store, selling snacks and house hold items on one side of the store. Curt's currently has a clientele from all across the United States.

== History ==
Curtis Jones and his wife, Hazel Jones, originally owned a meat market called Bristol Market in Independence, Missouri. In 1947 Curtis and his wife moved their business to a nearby produce market and renamed it Curt's Market. Since its founding, it has been active in the Maywood community's history, in which it resides. The store also has a history of award-winning meat products that has stemmed from Kansas City's already long history of barbecue. Harry S. Truman and his wife, Bess Truman, are some of Curt's most notable customers; Truman lived about one mile from the market and frequented it often. Since its founding, The store has also been visited by every mayor of Independence, Missouri. Curtis Jones owned and operated the store until 1989, when he decided to sell it. He was initially hesitant about selling the store to a woman, but Donna Pittman, the current owner, convinced him to do so. The name of the market was changed to Curt's Famous Meats in 2004.

== Current operations ==
Donna Pittman serving a customer

The store has a staff that is predominately female. They are known locally as the Lady Meat Cutters, although they do have a few male meat cutters.

The store holds a small Socrates Café organized by Van Horn High School. They have met every spring through summer since 2009. There, students, teachers, and Pittman discuss local and national events and issues using the socratic method of discussion. Local political faces have also joined in discussions, including Independence mayor Don Reimal.

== Awards ==
Curt's Famous Meats has many awards, both locally and nationally, and has been recognized for its performance as a small business.

- American Royal winner: 1989, 1992, 1994, 1997, 2004, 2007, 2008, 2009, 2010
- Lenexa Barbecue winner: 1989, 1999, 2003, 2004, 2010, 2011
- Blue Springs Blaze Off winner: 1990, 1992, 2003, 2004, 2005
- Raytown Barbecue winner: 1989, 1991, 1996, 2002, 2006, 2008
- Sedalia Barbecue winner: 2008, 2009
- Tonganoxie Barbecue winner: 2004, 2007, 2008
- Peculiar Barbecue winner: 2006, 2008
- Laurie Barbecue winner: 2005, 2007, 2008, 2010
- Sugar Creek Barbecue winner: 2010, 2011
- Small Business Monthly's “25 Under 25” award: 2003

== See also ==
- Kansas City-style barbecue
- List of butcher shops
