= List of butcher shops =

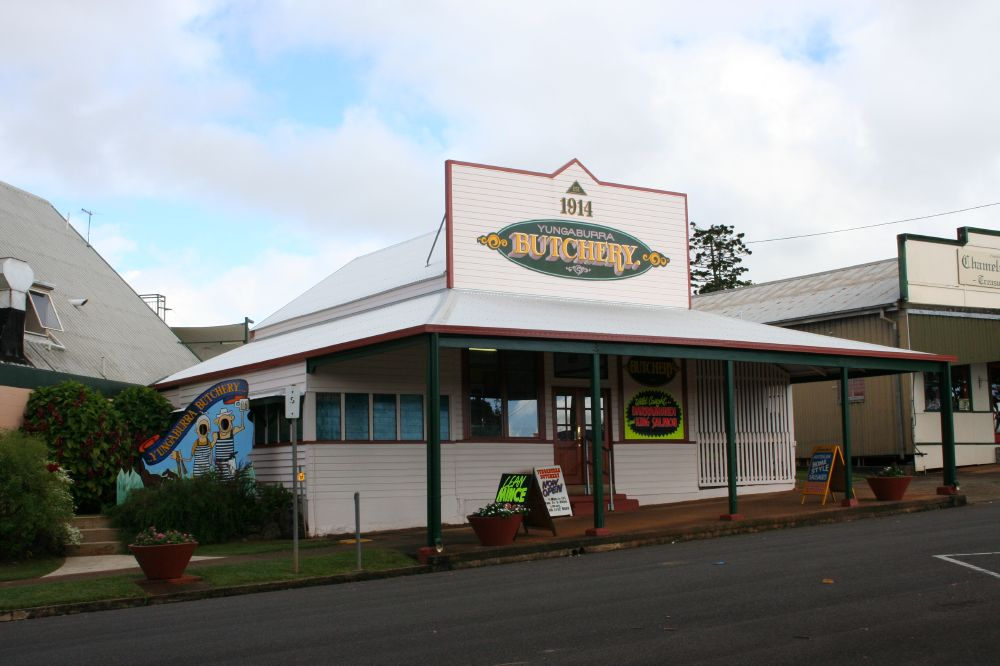
Butchers Shop, Yungaburra

Curt's Famous Meats

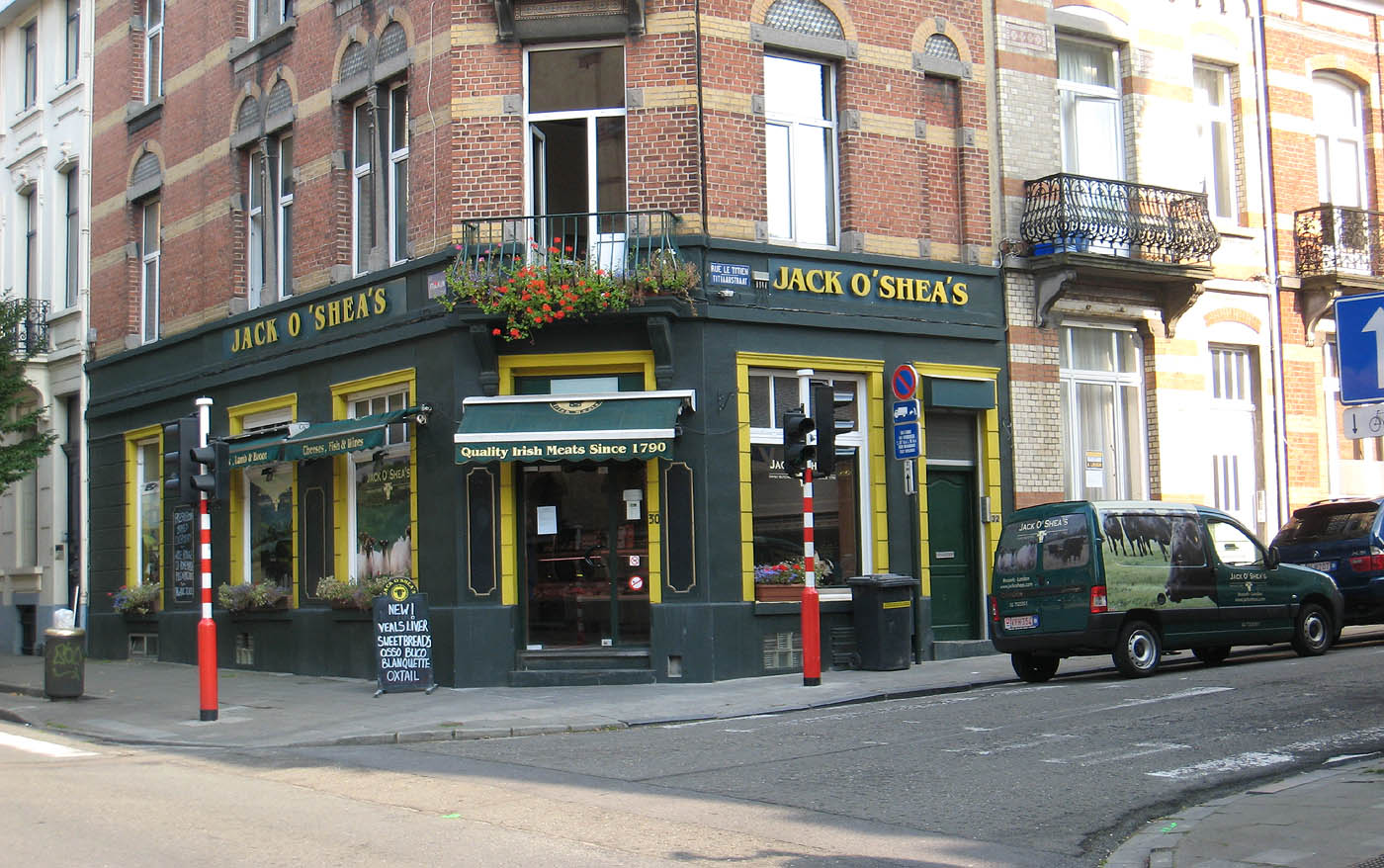
Jack O'Shea's

Following is a list of notable butcher shops:

- Allens of Mayfair, London, U.K.
- Beast and Cleaver, Seattle, Washington, U.S.
- Butchers Shop, Yungaburra, Queensland, Australia
- C Lidgate, London
- Curt's Famous Meats, Independence, Missouri, U.S.
- Galkoff's, Liverpool
- Ginger Pig, London
- Keevil and Keevil, U.K.
- Michael Kirk, U.K.
- Mzoli's, Cape Town, South Africa
- Old Butcher's Shop, Childers, Queensland, Australia
- Jack O'Shea's
- Pasture PDX, Portland, Oregon
- Petrini's
- R J Balson & Son
- Reid's Butcher Shop, Queensland, Australia
- The Shambles
- State Butchers Shop, Roma, Queensland, Australia
- Victor Churchill, Queensland, Australia
- Walkerston State Butcher's Shop, Queensland, Australia

== See also ==
- Butcher block
- List of bakeries
