= Galkoff's, Liverpool =

Coordinates: 53°24′32″N 02°58′09.80″W

Galkoff's
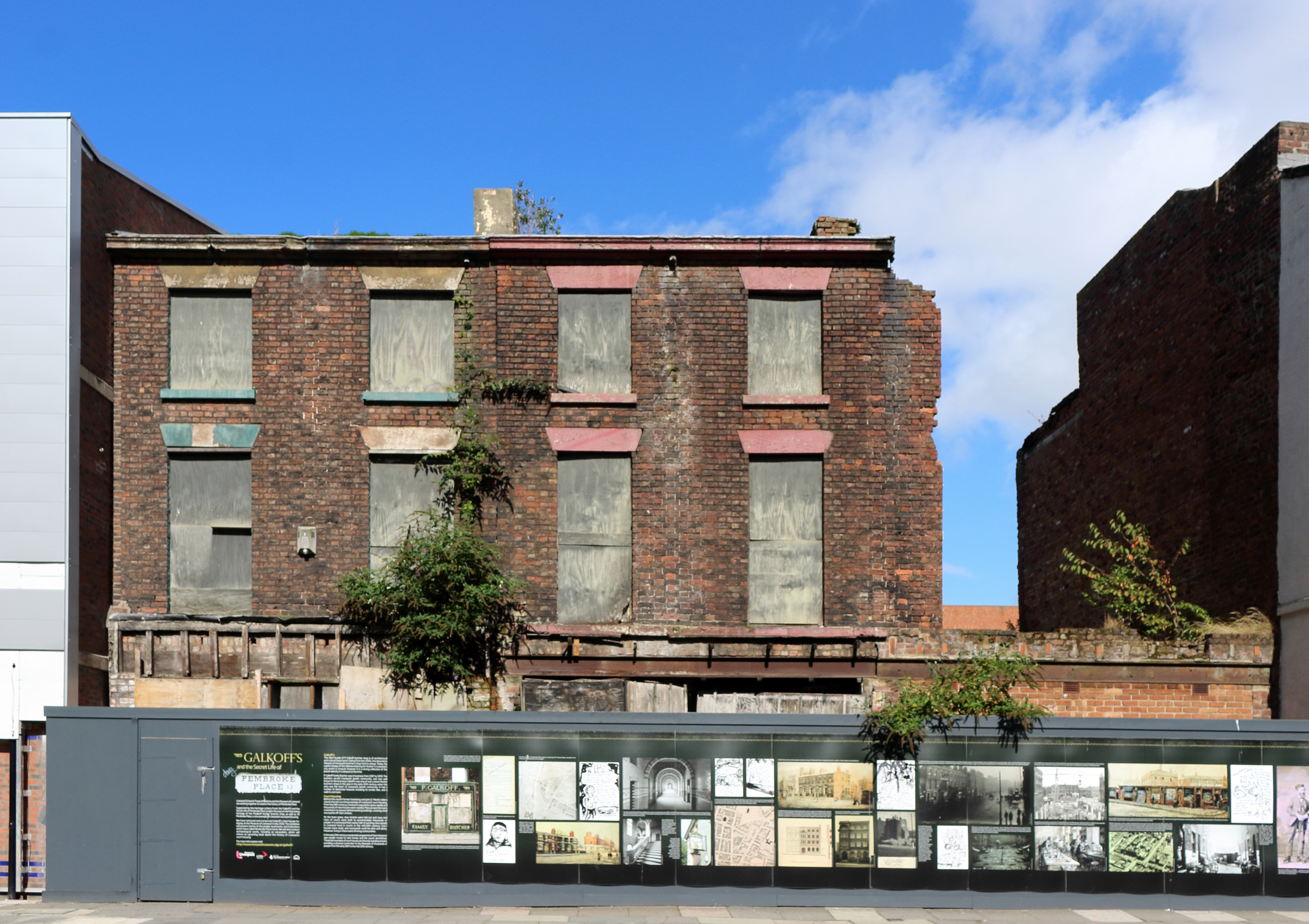
- The frontage in 2018 after removal of the tiling.
- Interactive map of Galkoff's
- Location: 29 Pembroke Place, Liverpool

History
- Built: 1820

Listed Building – Grade II
- Designated: 4 April 2007
- Delisted: 22 May 2020
- Reference no.: 1391920

Galkoff's was a kosher butcher shop in Liverpool during the early and mid-20th century. Its location at 29 Pembroke Place, Liverpool L3 was at the then heart of the Jewish community in the city. Whilst the shop ceased trading in 1979 and the site is now derelict, the site was Grade II listed in April 2007 in recognition of its significance to Liverpool's Jewish community and for the elegance of its tiled exterior. The building was further protected by a hoarding which had a mural, designed by local artist Donna Berry and executed by the children of King David School, depicting scenes of the life of Liverpool's Jewish community. The building was demolished around 2019-2020 and the site is now a car park.

== The shop ==
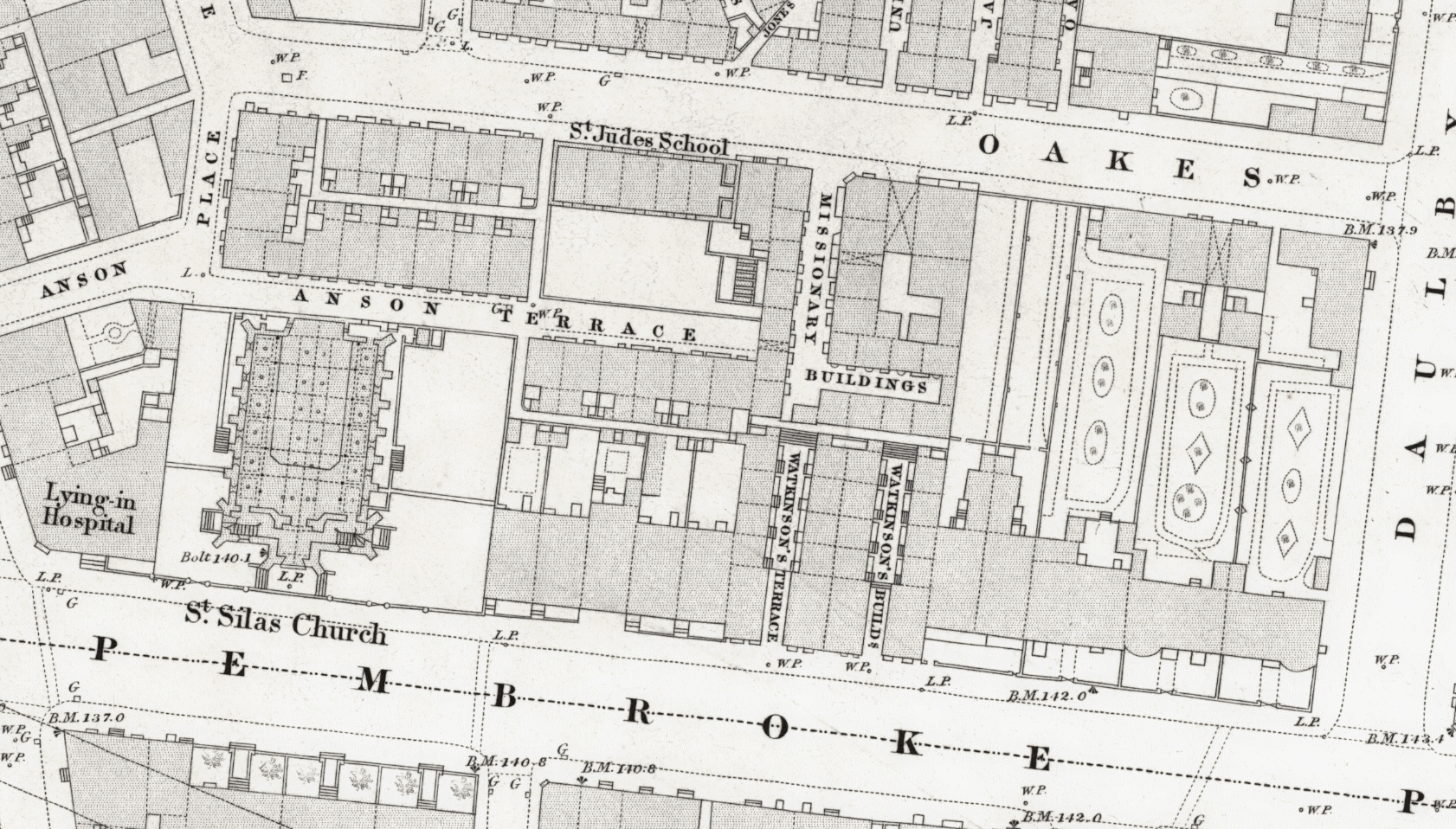
Ordnance Survey map of Pembroke Place, circa 1850

29 Pembroke Place was one of a terrace of Georgian town houses built in 1820. In 1907 it was purchased by Percy Galkoff, a Jewish emigré from Poland, who had it reconstructed as a kosher butcher's shop. In 1933 he added the tiled shop front which is a feature of the building The business was run by him and his family until 1979, when it was sold to Liverpool City Council. The building changed hands several times, becoming derelict despite remedial work, and afflicted throughout by planning blight. The current owners, Liverpool School of Tropical Medicine, have co-operated with the Museum of Liverpool Life to preserve the frontage of No.29 and the neighbouring Grade II listed court dwellings, in their “Secret Life of Liverpool” project. The building structure of Galkoff's at 29 Pembroke Place was demolished around 2019–2020, shortly before its Grade II listing was officially removed in May 2020. The frontage is now on display at the museum.

== The frontage ==
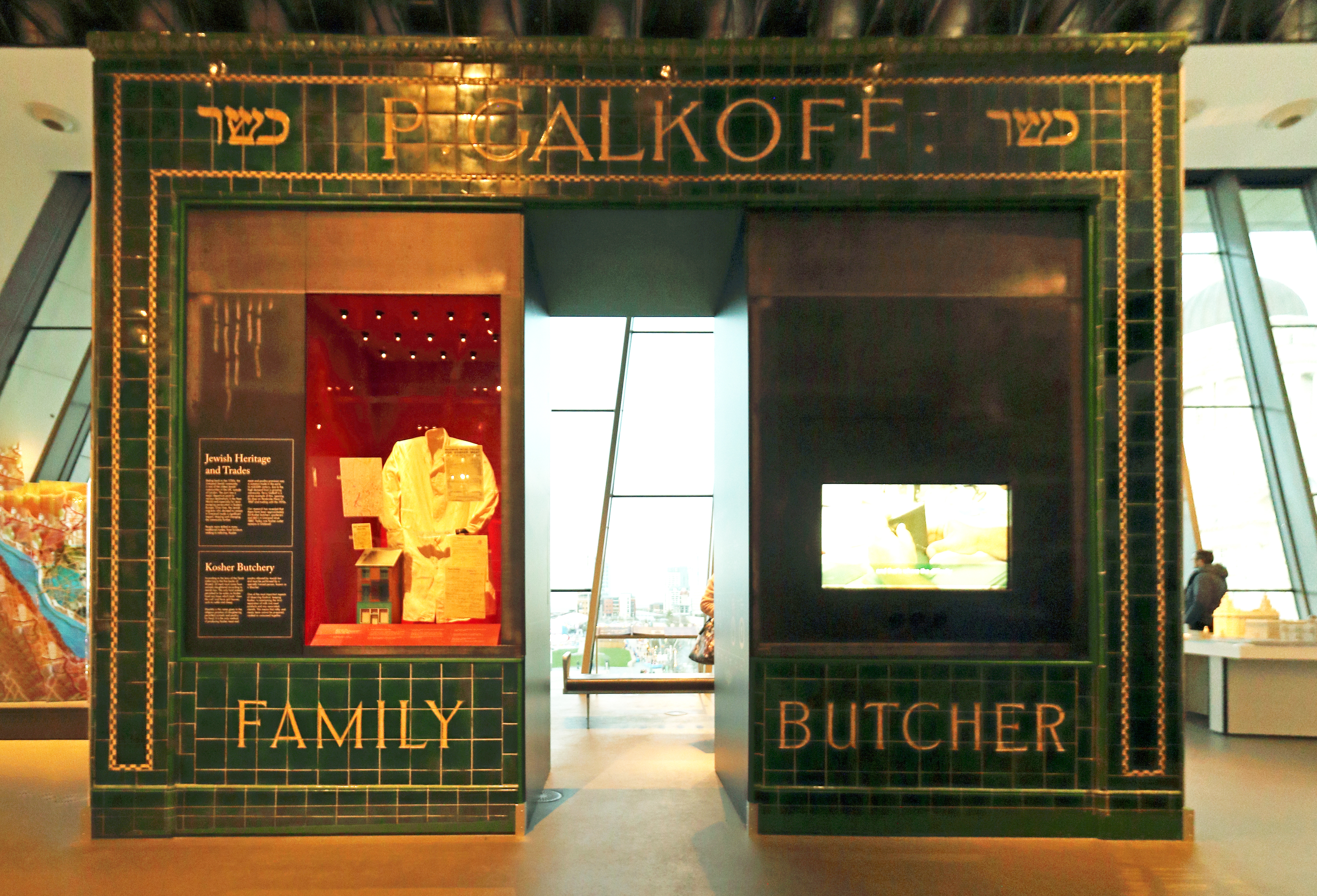
The façade, restored and on display in the Museum of Liverpool

The shop front of No. 29 was added for Percy Galkoff by local builder, John Tomkinson. It comprised a facing of green faience tiles with gold patterning, and bearing the legend “P. Galkoff Family Butcher”. It also bore the word “Kosher” in Hebrew lettering, also in gold.

== The mural ==
The site was protected for many years by a hoarding, which was decorated with a mural in 2007. The mural, the product of the Galkoff's Centenary Art Project, was designed by local artist Donna Berry in collaboration with the pupils of King David school. It depicted the history of the Jewish community in Liverpool, and notable people (such as singer Frankie Vaughan, Beatles manager Brian Epstein, and Lord Mayor Louis Caplan) and places (Princes Road Synagogue, Harold House Community Centre) in that community. Many of the images are preserved in the Galkoff exhibit at the Museum of Liverpool Life.

== See also ==
- List of butcher shops
