= Mykyrokka =

Traditional Finnish soup

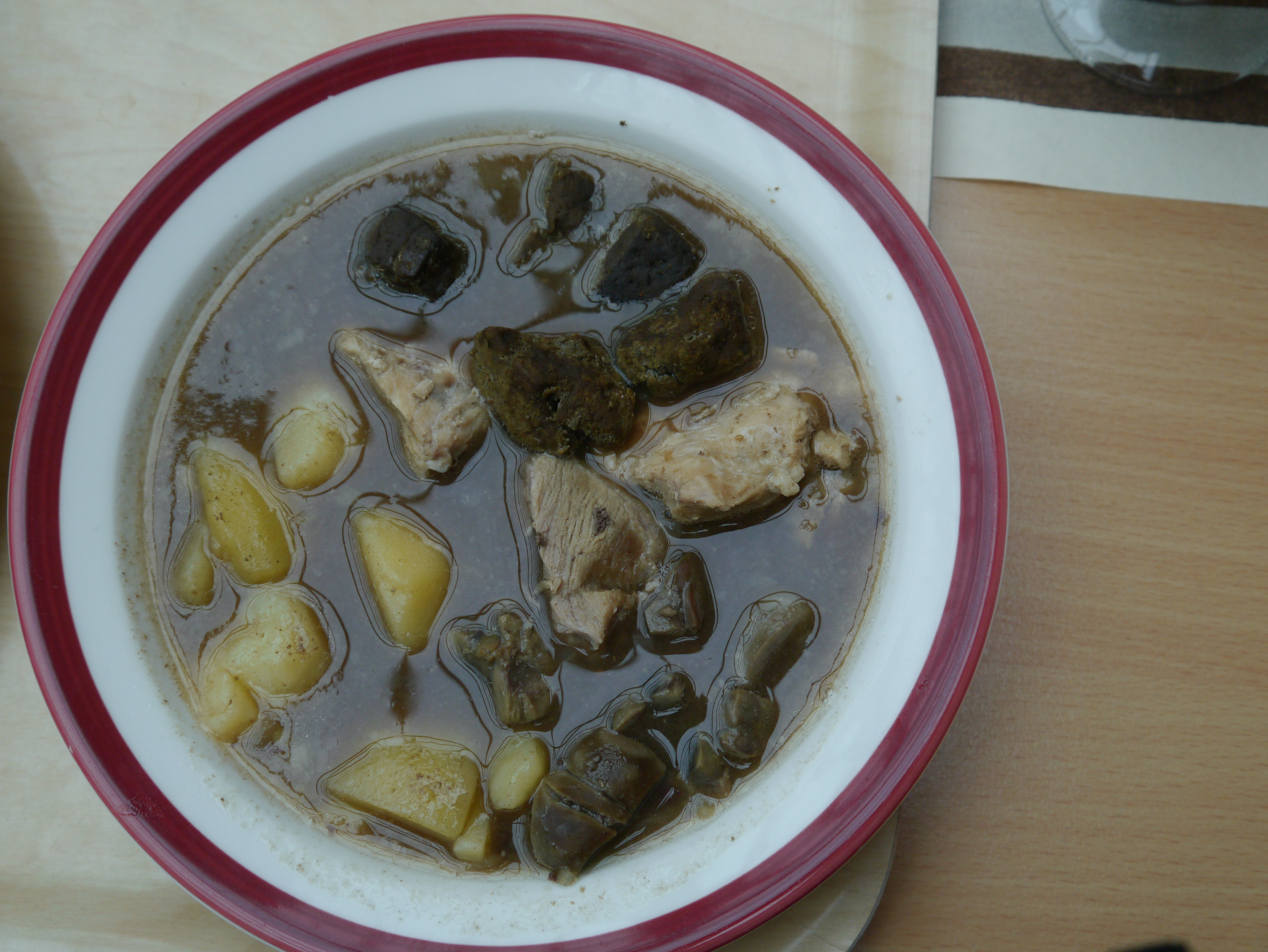
- A bowl of mykyrokka
- Alternative names: Tappaiskeitto ("Butchery soup")
- Type: Soup
- Course: Main course
- Place of origin: Finland
- Region or state: Savonia (Eastern Finland Province)
- Serving temperature: Hot
- Main ingredients: Dumplings (blood and barley flour), fatty meat, offal, potatoes, onions, salt, black pepper, water

Mykyrokka (Finnish: [ˈmykyˌrokːɑ]) is a soup that is a typical traditional dish in eastern Finland (Savo region). The main ingredient is myky: a palm sized dumpling made from blood and barley flour. The dumplings are cooked in the soup. The soup also contains potatoes, onions, fatty meat, and offal such as kidneys, liver and or heart. Salt and black pepper are the usual seasonings.

This soup is also called tappaiskeitto (i.e., "butchery soup") referring to an old farm custom of autumn butchery when some animals were butchered and the meat and organs were made into sausages, hams, and other meats, and what remained was put into the soup.

Soup is also considered the traditional parish dish of the Heinola town in the 1980s.

== See also ==
- Kesäkeitto
