= Shire of Burnett =

Coordinates: 24°48′56″S 152°27′44″E

- Local government area
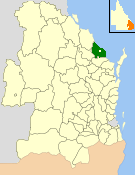
- Location within Queensland

- Country: Australia
- State: Queensland
- Region: Wide Bay–Burnett
- Established: 1994
- Council seat: Bargara (160 Hughes Rd)

Area
  - Total: 2,000.8 km^{2} (772.5 sq mi)

Population
  - Total: 27,232 (2006 census)
  - Density: 13.6106/km^{2} (35.2512/sq mi)
- Website: Shire of Burnett
LGAs around Shire of Burnett
Kolan	Miriam Vale	Coral Sea
Kolan	Shire of Burnett	Coral Sea
Isis	Isis	Hervey Bay

The Shire of Burnett was a local government area located in the Wide Bay–Burnett region of Queensland, Australia. It surrounded, but did not include, the regional city of Bundaberg, and covered an area of 2,000.8 square kilometres (772.5 sq mi). It existed as a local government entity from its creation through the amalgamation of the Shire of Gooburrum and the Shire of Woongarra in 1994 until 2008, when it amalgamated with the City of Bundaberg and other councils in the region to form the Bundaberg Region.

== History ==
On 21 November 1991, the Electoral and Administrative Review Commission, created two years earlier, produced its second report, and recommended that local government boundaries in the Bundaberg area be rationalised. The Local Government (Bundaberg and Burnett) Regulation 1993 was gazetted on 17 December 1993, in effect amalgamating the Shires of Gooburrum and Woongarra, and transferring a newer urban area to the City of Bundaberg. On 30 March 1994, the Shire of Burnett came into being.

On 15 March 2008, under the Local Government (Reform Implementation) Act 2007 passed by the Parliament of Queensland on 10 August 2007, the Shire of Burnett merged with the City of Bundaberg and the Shires of Isis and Kolan to form the Bundaberg Region.

== Population ==
Year	Population (total)	Population (Gooburrum)	Population (Woongarra)
1921	5,435	2,922	2,513
1933	7,202	3,915	3,287
1947	7,170	3,825	3,345
1954	7,835	4,131	3,704
1961	8,521	4,372	4,149
1966	9,710	4,776	4,934
1971	9,669	4,519	5,150
1976	14,018	5,227	8,791
1981	15,126	5,261	9,865
1986	17,832	5,917	11,915
1991	23,608*	7,117	16,491
1996	21,218*		
2001	23,598		
2006	27,232		

* Excluding the area transferred to City of Bundaberg in 1994, the population of Burnett was 15,417 in 1991.

== Towns and localities ==
The Shire of Burnett included the following settlements:

North Burnett area:

- Abbotsford
- Avondale
- Bucca
- Fairymead
- Gooburrum
- Littabella
- Meadowvale
- Miara
- Moore Park
- Moorland
- Oakwood
- Rosedale^{1}
- Sharon
- South Kolan
- Watalgan
- Waterloo
- Waterloo
- Winfield
- Yandaran

South Burnett area:

- Alloway
- Bargara^{2}
- Branyan
- Burnett Heads
- Calavos
- Coonarr
- Coral Cove^{2}
- Electra
- Elliott
- Elliott Heads^{2}
- Givelda
- Innes Park^{2}
- Kalkie^{2}
- Kinkuna
- Mon Repos^{2}
- Pine Creek
- Port of Bundaberg
- Qunaba^{2}
- Rubyanna^{2}
- South Bingera
- Windermere^{2}
- Woongarra

^{1} - split with Gladstone Region
^{2} - split with the former City of Bundaberg
