= City of Bundaberg =

Coordinates: 24°51′53.89″S 152°20′55.15″E

- Local government area
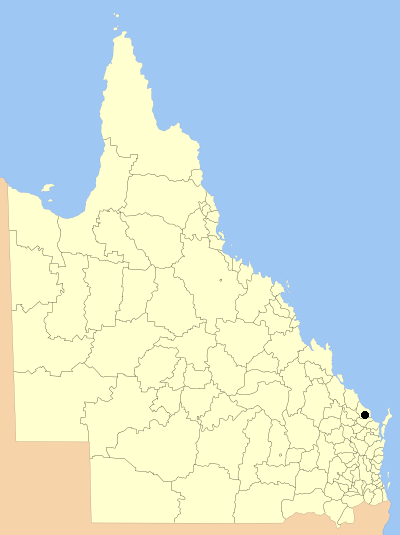
- Location within Queensland

- Country: Australia
- State: Queensland
- Region: Wide Bay–Burnett
- Established: 1860
- Council seat: Bundaberg

Government
  - State electorate: Bundaberg, Burnett
  - Federal division: Hinkler

Area
  - Total: 95.5 km^{2} (36.9 sq mi)

Population
  - Total: 45,802 (2006 census)
  - Density: 479.60/km^{2} (1,242.2/sq mi)
- Website: City of Bundaberg

The City of Bundaberg was a local government area located in the Wide Bay–Burnett region of Queensland, Australia, encompassing the centre and inner suburbs of the regional city of Bundaberg. The city covered an area of 95.5 square kilometres (36.9 sq mi), and existed as a local government entity in various forms from 1881 until 2008, when it amalgamated with several other councils in the surrounding area to form the Bundaberg Region.

== History ==
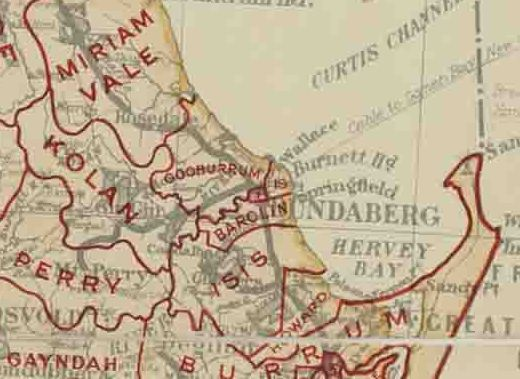
Map of Bundaberg Municipality and adjacent local government areas, March 1902. Legend: Bundaberg Municipality (1), Woongarra Division (19)

Local government in the Bundaberg area began on 11 November 1879 with the creation of the Bundaberg Division as one of 74 divisions around Queensland under the Divisional Boards Act 1879 with a population of 776.

On 22 April 1881, a 4.1-square-kilometre (1.6 sq mi) area with a population of 1,192 was split from the Division and incorporated as the Borough of Bundaberg under the Local Government Act 1878.

In 1902, the municipality constructed waterworks and water supply facilities at a cost of £22,492. The reservoir capacity was 6850 ft and the pumping power being 960,000 gallons per 24 hours.

With the passage of the Local Authorities Act 1902, Barolin Division became the Shire of Barolin and the Borough of Bundaberg became the Town of Bundaberg on 31 March 1903.

In 1909, the borough was area of 1¾ square miles, with 30 miles of streets, 1400 rate-payers, a capital value of £157,085, and collected £4597 in rates (in 1908). The indebitness of the town on account of Government loans totals £39,717 13s, the annual repayment being £2532.

On 22 November 1913, the Town of Bundaberg was proclaimed a city becoming the City of Bundaberg.

On 21 December 1917, the Shire of Barolin was abolished and its area split between the City of Bundaberg and the Shire of Woongarra. Bundaberg grew to 45.2 square kilometres (17.5 sq mi) and was united with what was then its entire suburban extent.

On 21 November 1991, the Electoral and Administrative Review Commission, created two years earlier, produced its second report, and recommended that local government boundaries in the Bundaberg area be rationalised. The Local Government (Bundaberg and Burnett) Regulation 1993 was gazetted on 17 December 1993, and on 30 March 1994, a portion of the Woongarra (the rest of which was merged into the new Shire of Burnett) was transferred to the City, more than doubling its area and increasing its population by 8,200 in 1991 census terms.

On 15 March 2008, under the Local Government (Reform Implementation) Act 2007 passed by the Parliament of Queensland on 10 August 2007, the City of Bundaberg merged with the Shires of Burnett, Isis and Kolan to form the Bundaberg Region.

== Suburbs ==
The City of Bundaberg included the following settlements:

- Ashfield
- Avenell Heights
- Avoca
- Bargara^{1}
- Branyan
- Bundaberg Central
- Bundaberg East
- Bundaberg North
- Bundaberg South
- Bundaberg West
- Coral Cove^{1}
- Elliott Heads^{1}
- Innes Park^{1}
- Kensington
- Kalkie^{1}
- Kepnock
- Millbank
- Mon Repos^{1}
- Norville
- Qunaba^{1}
- Rubyanna^{1}
- Svensson Heights
- Thabeban
- Walkervale
- Windermere^{1}

^{1} - split with the former Shire of Burnett

== Population ==
Year	Population
1921	9,276
1933	11,466
1947	15,926
1954	19,951
1961	22,839
1966	25,402
1971	27,324
1976	30,456
1981	30,937
1986	31,427
1991	32,737*
1996	42,554
2001	43,146
2006	45,901

* The population of the 1996 area in 1991 was 41,219.
