= Sunnyside Sugar Plantation =

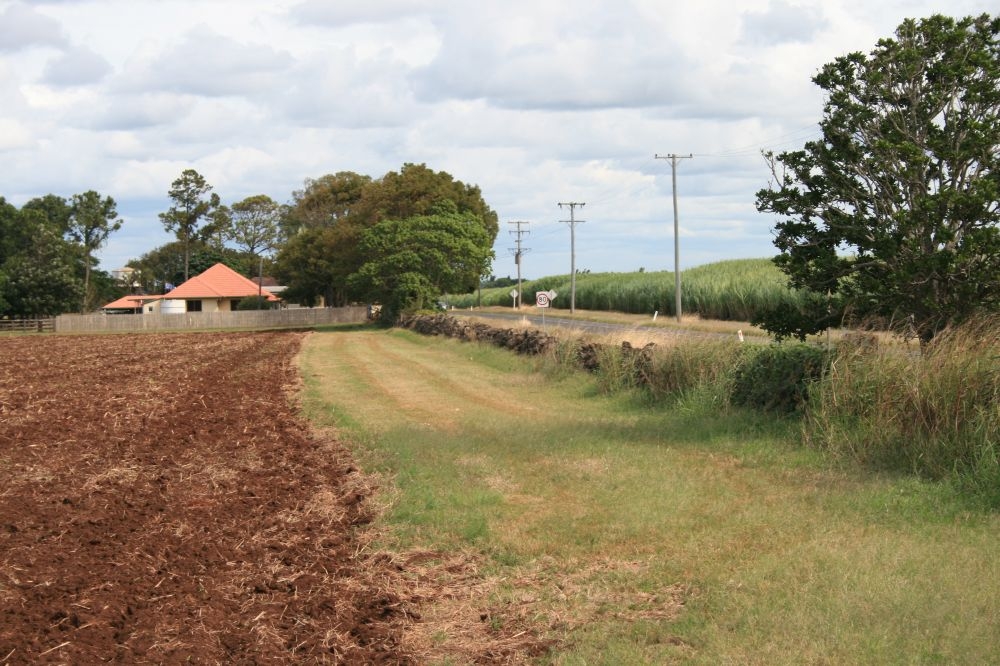
- Sunnyside Sugar Plantation, 2009

- Location within Queensland Location within Australia
- 24.8543°S 152.4152°E
- Location: 94 Windermere Road, Windermere, Bundaberg Region, Queensland, Australia

History
- Design period: 1870s - 1890s (late 19th century)
- Built: c. 1880s

Queensland Heritage Register
- Official name: Sunnyside Sugar Plantation (former) Remains, Dry-rubble Boundary Wall, Sunnyside Sugar Plantation
- Type: state heritage (archaeological, built)
- Designated: 13 May 1996
- Reference no.: 601700
- Significant period: 1880s (fabric); 1880s-1900s early (historical)
- Builders: South Sea Islander labour

Sunnyside Sugar Plantation is the heritage-listed remains of a former sugar plantation at 94 Windermere Road, Windermere, Bundaberg Region, Queensland, Australia. It was built in c. 1880s by South Sea Islander labour. It is also known as Dry-rubble Boundary Wall. It was added to the Queensland Heritage Register on 13 May 1996.

== History ==
The former Sunnyside sugar plantation, which initially comprised 100 acres (40 hectares), is situated on Windermere Road, to the east of Bundaberg. The property was established by Edward Turner in 1875, and used to grow sugar from the early 1880s, in which work South Sea Islanders were employed until the turn of the century. In 1884 Turner established a juice mill on the property, piping his cane juice to the Millaquin refinery. Remnants of the sugar plantation era include two weeping fig trees (Ficus benjamina), an area of 29 burials in three rows, as well as a dry-rubble wall along Windermere Road. Initially the wall extended almost the full road frontage of Portion 85, but it has been reduced to about half this length (201 metres (659 ft)).

The economy of Bundaberg was underpinned by the sugar industry from the early 1880s. During the late 19th century when South Sea Islanders were employed, it progressed from being the second largest sugar producing region in Queensland to the largest by 1900. The employment of Islanders was always controversial; a raft of legislation being introduced to protect their welfare in response to incidents of exploitation, and then to phase out their employment in favour of the use of white labour.

The township of Bundaberg was established on the banks of the Burnett River. Timbergetters came through the area in the 1860s and were later followed by sugar planters taking advantage of the lands made available under the Crown Lands Alienation Act 1860 and the 1865 Coffee and Sugar Regulations. By 1868 the district surveyor John Thompson was instructed to mark out a town on the south bank of the river. This was completed by 1869 and the town was declared a port of entry in June 1871. The port serviced the copper mines of Mount Perry, although in competition with the nearby port of Maryborough. Sugar became the industry which underpinned the prosperity of Bundaberg, with the first of many sugar mills there established by Richard Palmer in 1872.

Edward Turner, his wife Janet and daughter Pauline arrived in Hervey Bay aboard the "Sultana" in 1866. A native of Oswestry, Shropshire, England and a stonemason/bricklayer by trade, Turner reputedly first went prospecting on the Palmer River goldfields. He then worked as a stonemason for Robert Cran at his plantation Yengarie, west of Maryborough. Turner purchased a town allotment in Churchill Street, Maryborough, in 1867 which he sold in mid 1874. He then selected 100 acres (40 ha) in the Woongarra Scrub to the east of Bundaberg in June 1874. His selection, Portion 85, comprised 60 acres (24 ha) of agricultural land and 40 (16ha) of second class pastoral. He lived on the property which he named "Sunnyside" from January 1875. By the following year Turner had cleared and cultivated 18 acres. He built a slab house with three rooms and a kitchen with a brick oven and a number of outbuildings; established a waterhole and a well; built a pigsty and a calf paddock and was growing maize at this time. By 1880 he had 20 acres under cultivation, with an unknown crop. Turner fulfilled the conditions of his selection under the Crown Lands Alienation Act 1868 and in 1881 he applied to purchase the property, and a deed of grant was issued.

Turner used South Sea Islander labour, as did most farmers in the district. The use of South Sea Islander labour had been pioneered in Australia in the 1840s by Benjamin Boyd in the New South Wales (NSW) Riverina District, employing them as shepherds in lieu of convict labour. The procurement of South Sea Islander labour to Queensland was initiated by Captain Robert Towns. He had been involved in the importation of Asiatic labourers during the 1840s and 1850s in NSW, and was also part of a push for the use of Indian coolie labour in the early 1860s in Queensland. At the time the concept that labouring in the tropics was unhealthy for Europeans had widespread currency. The Queensland Government removed restrictions on the introduction of Asiatic labour in May 1861, which led to the introduction of South Sea Island labourers to Queensland.

Robert Towns' first group of 67 South Sea Islanders arrived in Brisbane on the "Don Juan" on 14 August 1863. They went to work on his cotton plantation Townsvale (later Veresdale) on the Logan River, where Towns hoped to capitalise on declining cotton production in America during the Civil War. Captain Claudius Whish used Islanders on his Oaklands Sugar Mill near Caboolture as did Captain Louis Hope on his Ormiston sugar plantation at Ormiston, near Cleveland. In 1865 a group of Islanders was landed at Bowen, to be employed by pastoralists. By March 1868, 2107 Islanders had been brought to Queensland, employed in various capacities including agricultural and pastoral work, and as servants in the towns. They lived and worked anywhere from Mackay and Bowen, to the Wide Bay district and west to Roma. South Sea Islanders were generally employed on three-year contracts bound by the Masters and Servants Act 1861.

By 1868, there were reports that the recruitment of South Sea Islanders had devolved into kidnapping (a practice known as blackbirding). In response the Polynesian Labourers Act 1868, was enacted to regulate recruitment. Under the Act, the Islanders were required to sign a contract for up to three years, on a minimum wage of £6 per year plus rations and a trip home after three years. Deaths and desertions were to be reported to the nearest magistrate. In 1870 government agents were appointed to sail with the recruiting vessels to supervise the conditions of appointment. During the 1870s and 1880s there was ongoing public criticism and political debate about the use of Islander labour. The number of recruitments increased from 1539 in 1868 to 10,057 by 30 June 1884.

A number of Acts of Parliament were introduced to protect the Islanders from unscrupulous recruiters and employers including the Kidnapping Act of 1872 and the Pacific Islanders Labourers Act 1875. Following a Select Committee enquiry into Polynesian Labour, further amendments were initiated in 1877 and 1878 but not legislated. Then in December 1880 new Premier Thomas McIlwraith rescinded the 1868 Act, introducing a new Pacific Islander Labourers Act 1880 which set limitations on the age of recruits, their living conditions, medical service and ration provisions. Islanders could only be employed in tropical or semi-tropical agriculture, including the cultivation of sugar cane, cotton, tea, coffee, rice and spices.

South Sea Islanders working in Bundaberg had initially arrived through Maryborough. The first direct shipment into the Port of Bundaberg occurred in May 1879, by the schooner "Lucy and Adelaide". The Islanders numbered 81 males and seven females. The number contracted to each farm or plantation is unknown. Labourers were recruited from a number of locations including the Solomon Islands, New Hebrides, and Loyalty Islands, all with different languages and customs. This region is now known as Melanesia, and includes the Bismark Archipelago of Papua New Guinea. Despite claims that Edward Turner was personally involved in the recruitment trade, no evidence has been found indicating his ownership of any boat engaged in recruiting Islanders.

Turner continued to plan the development of his farm. In December 1883 he subdivided a two and a half acre lot (Sub 1, Portion 185) (1ha) from the north-western corner of his allotment along Windermere Road. A juice mill was established on this site, in partnership with Frederic and Charles Buss. They had a number of sugar plantations and numerous business interests in the region, including a store in town that became Buss and Turner in 1886 after James Edwin Turner (no relation to Edward Turner) from Sydney joined the firm. Edward Turner's juice mill was operational by 1884, when cane was crushed and the juice piped 3 miles (4.8 km) to the Millaquin Refinery (established 1881) for treatment. Juice mills were commonplace in the area with 24 established between 1882 and 1884, including at Ashgrove, Avoca, Fairymead, Glenmorris, Grange, Kepnock, Mabbro, Summerville, Windermere, and Woodbine by October 1883. Hummock, Oakwood, and Spring Hill mills were established in 1883 and Seaview, Mon Repos, and Sunnyside and Woodlands in 1884.

Sunnyside's juice mill site (Sub 1), was transferred to Edward Turner's sole ownership in March 1888. In order to ensure the viability of the juice mill, Turner acquired another parcel of land on the southern slopes of The Hummock (Portion 87) in October 1888. This expanded his property to 190 acres (77 ha), financed by a £2000 mortgage from the Commercial Banking Company of Sydney against the Sunnyside property. Sunnyside was typical of the smaller family-run sugar plantations in Bundaberg, which were generally between 150 and 200 acres (61 and 81 ha). Many had their own juice mills, piping juice to Millaquin refinery - as opposed to the large plantations such as Fairymead, of 1,252 acres (507 ha) and Bingera of 1,150 acres (470 ha) which had large mills.

The type of work undertaken by the South Sea Islanders on the property and their conditions were summarised by the eldest son Herbert Turner in his 1955 publication: "Rural Life in Sunny Queensland". He indicated that a property of approximately 150 acres with a juice mill required about 45 Islanders. The first duty of an owner was to supply each Islander with a new blanket, clothing, and a hat, a plug of tobacco, which was subsequently supplied weekly, and the clothing half-yearly. His pay was between £20 and £25 which was paid half yearly at the Immigration Depot in the presence of the Inspector of Polynesians. Three meals were supplied daily, as specified by Government regulations.

While some of the properties had been cleared initially by the selectors, the role of the Islanders was to clear the remaining virgin scrub: felling, burning and clearing the large volcanic stones, which were collected and sometimes drilled and blasted. Rocks unearthed during this process were placed on wooden sleds, pulled by draught horses. Big rocks which would not fit on the sled would be broken up with spalling hammers. These pieces would then be placed on corn bags; an Islander on each corner, it would then be carried to the sled. When full, the sleds were taken to the end of the paddock where they were unloaded. Dry-rubble walls were constructed in layers, with larger stones placed around the outside and smaller stones used for infill. This seems to have been a common construction method in the Woongarra and was employed at Sunnyside to make a wall along the northern boundary of the property. About 6 examples of it remain in the Bundaberg district, including one associated with the former Mon Repos sugar plantation and entered in the Queensland Heritage Register (the South Sea Islander Wall). Edward Turner was a stonemason and it is probable that he directed construction of the wall at Sunnyside. The creation of dry-stone boundary walls was commonplace in England where many of Queensland's settlers originated.

Islanders were also employed in planting cane, by following behind a horse-drawn plough driven by a European, and dropping cane plants into the furrows. Similarly at harvest time, the Islanders would be involved in cutting and loading cane into horse-drawn drays driven by Europeans.

Inspectors of Polynesians monitored the health and welfare of the Islanders. The first appointed to oversee Bundaberg and Maryborough in 1875 was also the sub-collector of customs. His 1877 replacement Charles Horrocks regularly inspected accommodation, clothing and weighed the food rations for the Islanders. Instances of large numbers of Islanders dying on individual farms were investigated, with one of the worst examples being those employed by Robert Cran at his Maryborough plantations of Yerra Yerra, Yengari and Illawarra. Seven deaths occurred at Yerra Yerra in 1878 due to dysentery from contaminated water. Again in 1880 a high mortality rate led to a medical investigation which blamed poor food, long working hours, bad water, and a lack of proper care for the sick.

The first inspector to be specifically allocated to Bundaberg was William O'Connell in 1882. The death rate remained high amongst the Islander population. Statistics provided to Parliament in 1888 indicated there had been 40,861 Islanders brought to Queensland since 1868, with 23,700 returned to their islands and 7635 deaths, although it was noted that not all deaths had been reported. While the statistics provided annually were broken down by district, they were not provided in relation to specific plantations. For example, in 1892, there were 186 deaths in Bundaberg, which was 66 more than the previous year, with dysentery a common cause. The rates remained high in subsequent years also, with 181 Islanders dead in 1893 and 175 in 1894. Economic historian Ralph Schlomowitz suggests that a general lack of immunity to a range of diseases to which Europeans had developed a partial immunity, such as measles, smallpox, influenza, tuberculosis, pneumonia, typhoid, dysentery and meningitis, proved fatal to both indigenous Australians and South Sea Islanders. He argued that the overall death rate of Pacific Islanders decreased from an average of 80 per 1000 (1879–87) to 35 per 1000 by 1893, suggesting that immunity built up over time. However, Islander deaths in Bundaberg appeared to be increasing. This was evidenced in statistics provided for the large plantations between December 1895 and December 1900, where Bingera experienced 135 deaths and Fairymead 58, both with increasing annual rates during this timeframe.

Deaths on Sunnyside occurred in both the Turner family and amongst the Islander labourers in the late 1880s to early 1890s. The Bundaberg Genealogical Association, using newspaper sources, identified seven reported deaths of Islanders on Sunnyside plantation; these being Coora, 9/09/1887; Tartal 24/04/1888; Yantircca 12/03/1888; Byeena 21/08/1888; Beeteah 12/01/1889; Charlie 18/02/1889 and Neeoo 17/02/1889. The causes of these people's deaths are unknown, and the location of their burials is not known. It was commonplace to bury Islanders on the sugar plantations on which they worked. Over 600 Islanders were also buried in the Bundaberg general cemetery, the earliest recorded in 1879.

Oral tradition states that a number of Islanders who worked on Sunnyside were buried on the property. Investigations undertaken by the Bundaberg Regional Council in 2012–13 indicated the location of 29 possible graves to the south-east of the two mature fig trees.

Deaths in the Turner family over this period have been attributed to typhoid, reputedly from drinking contaminated water from the well. Eldest daughter Pauline Fielding died in November 1889, followed by fourteen year old Isabella in December. Then their mother Janet Turner died in January 1890. It is likely that some Islanders on Sunnyside may also have succumbed to typhoid at this time. A further family death occurred in October 1894, when Edward's 19-year-old son Clarence drowned in the waterhole after suffering an epileptic fit. His body was found by his brother-in-law, Henry Albert Cattermull.

In the meantime, a change in government in 1883 led to new laws aimed at excluding Islander labour. The preference for white labour was implicit in the Pacific Islanders Labourers Act 1884 which was much more specific than the 1880 Act in relation to the type of work an Islander could be employed in, specifically restricting them to field work. The Pacific Island Labourers' Amendment Act 1885 legislated against the issue of recruitment licences for Islanders after 31 December 1890. The Crown Lands Act 1884 in tandem with the Sugar Works Guarantee Act 1884 moved to establish small family-run farms underpinned by the opening up of former crown land and leases. Interim measures to compensate for the loss of cheaper Islander labour included the commencement of the government-supported, co-operatively- owned central mill system and some government-owned mills. The first of these was established in Mackay in 1886, to only crush cane cut by white labour.

In early 1889, a Royal Commission inquired into the viability of the sugar industry which was in decline at that time. From its 1865 initiation by Louis Hope, the industry had expanded rapidly over the subsequent twenty years. However, there was a marked decline between 1885 and 1893, attributed to drought and a slump in world sugar prices. Bundaberg farmers formed a small company which set up a rum distillery in 1888 which helped the industry through these hard times. Edward Turner's evidence to the commission indicated that he owned 250 acres (100 ha) in total, 110 (44.5ha) of which were under sugar cultivation, and a further 20 (8ha) cultivated for other purposes. He employed seven Europeans and 45 Islanders. His total wage bill for 1888 was £588 to Europeans and £1420 to the Islanders, which indicates an annual income of £84 for a European and £31.10/- for an Islander. At that time he considered he could not successfully run the plantation without South Sea Islander labour.

By the end of 1891 it was evident that the prohibition of Islander labour would lead to the collapse of the sugar industry. New legislation was enacted in April 1892, stipulating conditions of employment for Islanders. It has been argued in Raymond Evans' "History of Queensland" (2007) that following the rewriting of the legislation the recruitment of Islanders was a reformed business, with so many pieces of protective legislation, regulation and inspection schedules in place that the prospects of exploitation and ill- treatment of workers were substantially reduced. Islanders became more skilled in negotiations and bargained for higher wages and more liberal contracts. This occurred on Sunnyside in 1893.

A new Inspector of Polynesians in Bundaberg, Henry St George Caulfield was appointed in April 1887. Caulfield had 13 years experience overseeing immigrant labour in Ceylon, and was thought to be "zealous in his duties as an inspector of plantations, and investigator of islanders' complaints against their employers". In July 1893, seven Islanders from Sunnyside Plantation complained to Caulfield that they were not being given enough food. Earlier that week they had burnt down one of their huts and set fire to the cane in protest. The Capricornian newspaper described the events as a "Kanaka strike".

The Inspector came to Sunnyside and after interviewing others on the farm agreed they had not been given enough food. Caulfield referred to an earlier case dating from 1890 where it was proved Edward Turner supplied insufficient food. Turner was charged with breaching the Masters and Servants Act, and was fined. The agreement with the Islander named Tong, who brought the charge to the court, was cancelled. Tong said he had never received good food from Turner in the five years he had worked there, but that this was the first time he had complained to Caulfield. Turner had remarried a widow, Sarah Barney, who brought five children to the marriage. It was Sarah's responsibility to provide food, although Edward was held accountable. Turner was also charged with assaulting an Islander named Raincombe. This occurred during the July banking crisis, where eight of Queensland's banks closed, including the Commercial Banking Company of Sydney with which Turner had his £2000 mortgage. While this would not justify the insufficient supply of food to Islander labourers on Sunnyside, it does suggest one reason for it to have happened. Most banks reopened by August.

Initiatives to improve the general health and welfare of South Sea Islanders in Bundaberg included an Islanders' hospital, designed by the Government Architect and built at a cost of £512 in 1893. The provision of a hospital had been referred to in the Pacific Islanders Immigration Act 1892, although it was not mandatory. Christian guidance was provided by Florence Young of Fairymead Plantation who started the Queensland Kanaka Mission in 1886, as an evangelical and non-denominational church (South Sea Islander Church). The Anglican Church was active in converting the Islanders who attended Sunday Service, while also providing evening classes teaching them to read.

The process of sugar growing, crushing and refining changed dramatically in the late 19th and early 20th centuries, initiated in part by the Sugar Works Guarantee Act 1893 which provided for construction of government-supported central mills, employing white labour. Sixty farmers from Gin Gin were the first in the region to successfully establish a co-operative mill in 1896.

Bundaberg was the second largest sugar producing region in Queensland between 1880 and 1900 when Islanders were employed. It produced 5797 tons (5890 tonnes) to Mackay's 12,023 tons (12,215 tonnes) in 1884. While all centres continually improved their output during the late 19th century, Bundaberg's output gradually closed the gap with Mackay. In 1893 Bundaberg produced 23,423 tons (23,798 tonnes) to Mackay's 24,872 (25,271 tonnes). By 1900, some sugar produced in Childers, Maryborough and Tiaro was processed in Bundaberg, and their production statistics were then included with Bundaberg, skewing the statistics in Bundaberg's favour. In 1900, 59,076 tons (60,023 tonnes) were produced, compared with 17,521 (17,802 tonnes) in Mackay. By that time Ingham had out-produced Mackay with 20,222 tons (20,546 tonnes).

During 1901–1902 the Sunnyside property, including the juice mill site was transferred into the ownership of Edward Turner's eldest son Herbert Turner and son-in-law Henry Cattermull. They had phased out Islander labour on the property by then. In February 1902, Herbert married Annie Thomas, the daughter of William Thomas, the engineer who designed and managed the Millaquin Mill. They built a house on The Hummock property, Portion 107, which was known in the family as "Top Farm". Edward Turner moved to a new property at Maroondan near Gin Gin. Sunnyside was reputedly one of the few plantations in the Bundaberg district able to produce and crush during the drought of 1900–1903.

Following Federation, the White Australia Policy predicated the end of Islander labour. New acts were introduced by the Commonwealth Government, requiring the end of South Sea Islander recruitment from 31 March 1904 and deportation of all Islanders by 31 December 1906. However, there were exemptions for those who had arrived prior to 1879; who had married women not of their race; whose children were being educated in state schools; and those who possessed freehold land or who were fearful of their lives if returned to their former homes.

The Sugar Labour Commission, established to report on the repatriation of Pacific Islanders, took evidence in Bundaberg in April 1906. Frank Courtice, city organiser of the Bundaberg District Workers Union, said he supported the development of the State refinery system and the cutting up of plantations into smaller farms run by individual farmers. This concept was supported by Henry Albert Cattermull, overseer on Sunnyside, who said he had used white labourers since 1902, who were mostly local farmers' sons, and he found them more reliable than itinerant workers. Henry St George Caulfield also gave evidence in relation to the number of Islanders still in the district, which he estimated to be 1100. There had been some problems returning South Sea Islanders to their homes and others were keen to remain in Queensland.

During the 1893 economic crisis, the Queensland National Bank formed a company known as Qunaba (QUeensland NAtional BAnk) which took over the financially struggling Millaquin refinery. It erected a new juice mill on site in 1906, making the small private juice mills obsolete. Millaquin then acquired numerous other plantations in the early 1900s. Sunnyside sold its cane to Windermere in 1911, and then Millaquin acquired both Windermere and The Hummock by 1912.

Changes in Sunnyside's ownership occurred in the early 20th century. Edward Turner died in April 1910, having been thrown from his horse at Maroondan. His property was divided between his son Herbert and son-in-law Henry Albert Cuttermull and his unmarried daughter Gertrude. His second wife Sarah had committed suicide in April 1907. The Sunnyside juice mill was closed down in 1911. In 1922 the Sunnyside Plantation was transferred to Benjamin and Sydney Herbert Courtice. They took out a £6000 mortgage with Cattermull. By that time Cattermull was a local councillor, having been president of the Cane Growers Union formed in 1908.

Ben Courtice was later Chairman of the Cane Growers Association. Cattermull died in 1935 and the mortgage over the plantation was transferred to his executors. Another of the Courtice brothers, Fred, was a Labor Party member of the Queensland Legislative Council and became Chairman of the Woongarra Shire in the 1940s. Ben Courtice became a Senator in 1937 and was Minister for Trade and Customs from 1946 until 1949. The former Sunnyside plantation remains in the ownership of the Courtice family. The grave of former owner Sidney Thomas Courtice 1/04/1922–13/08/2007) is located under the westernmost of the two mature fig trees on the northern part of the property and is not considered to be of state heritage significance. Some subdivision has occurred on Sunnyside, with a number of large house sites excised along Windermere Road including Lot 5 on RP 179915 in 1981; Lot 7 on RP 893076 in 1995; and Lot 8 on RP 825941 in 1997.

The two mature fig trees on the property were likely to have been planted toward the end of the period that Islanders worked there and were used to mark the entrance to the house (original house no longer extant).

Weeping fig trees (Ficus benjamina) are not native to the Bundaberg region and were known to have been introduced as street trees in Bourbong Street in 1891 (Bourbong Street Weeping Figs). It is also known that local bank manager, member of the Queensland Acclimatisation Society and trustee of the Bundaberg Botanic Gardens, William Fullerton, was cultivating them for distribution around the town in 1897. It is likely the two fig trees growing at Sunnyside today were planted after this time.

The Bundaberg and District South Sea Islanders Action Group was formed in the 1980s to improve understanding of the history of South Sea Islander peoples in the area and their important contribution to the sugar industry, and to locate sites significant to this history. The group has indicated it has a strong association with the fig trees, burials and dry-rubble wall on Sunnyside.

The listing originally focused on the wall remains, but was substantially expanded in 2013 to include the fig trees and graves after a long campaign by the Action Group in conjunction with the current owner, former federal MP Brian Courtice, a staunch advocate of recognising the abuses that occurred at Sunnyside and the graves of those who had died as a result. Ground penetrating radar was used on the site, finding 29 graves. The discovery spurred the Heritage Council to accede to the campaign and grant the current listing; it was ultimately successful despite a hostile initial report by the relevant Department that had recommended listing only the trees.

== Description ==
The former Sunnyside Sugar Plantation, now known simply as Sunnyside, comprises about 40.4 hectares of arable land, with some fenced areas for horses and cattle and an area comprising a house, gardens and various sheds. The dry-rubble wall runs along the north-eastern boundary with Windermere Road, while the two mature fig trees stand about 100 metres (330 ft) to the south of the road in the north-west corner of 9/SP155824, and the burials site about 50 metres (160 ft) to the south-east of them.

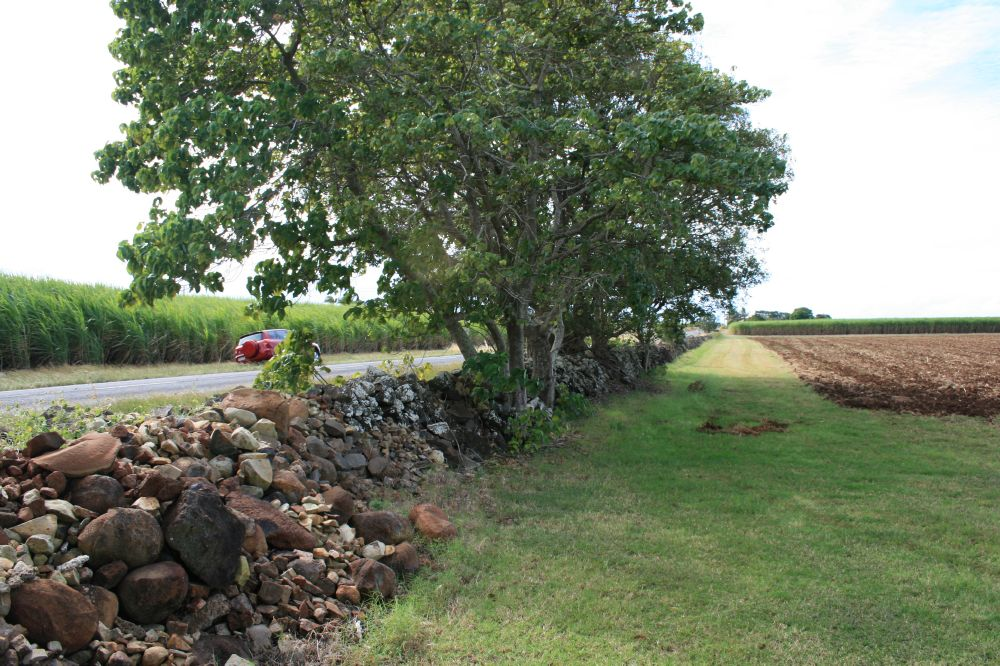
Dry-rubble wall, 2009

The dry-rubble wall extends for about 201 metres (659 ft) along the frontage of the former Sunnyside Sugar Plantation along Windermere Road. It is constructed of local surface volcanic rock, colloquially known as blue metal, collected when the land was being cleared for sugar cultivation in the 1880s. Some of the rocks show signs of spalling prior to removal from the fields. The wall is composed of larger rocks on the outside with smaller rocks piled into the cavity and used to fill the gaps between the larger ones. This process has been repeated upwards in the layers. There is no mortar used in the construction.

Two mature weeping fig trees (Ficus benjamina) are also located on the property to the south-west of the wall. Planted approximately 22 metres (72 ft) apart, they have trunks of about 1.5 metres (4 ft 11 in) in diameter and their height is estimated at 17 metres (56 ft) in 2012. They are set back approximately 110 metres (360 ft) from the Windermere Road property boundary (to centreline of trunks) in the north-west corner of the allotment, and were planted in front of the early house on the property (removed in 1957). The heritage boundary part taking in these trees is set off from the outermost edge of the tree canopies of the trees by two metres. All other features and structures within this area are not considered to be of cultural heritage significance, including fencing, the house (a nineteenth-century house relocated to the property in 1957) and its garden, the grave of Sidney Thomas Courtice and its marker, and a recent metal shed to the west of the house.

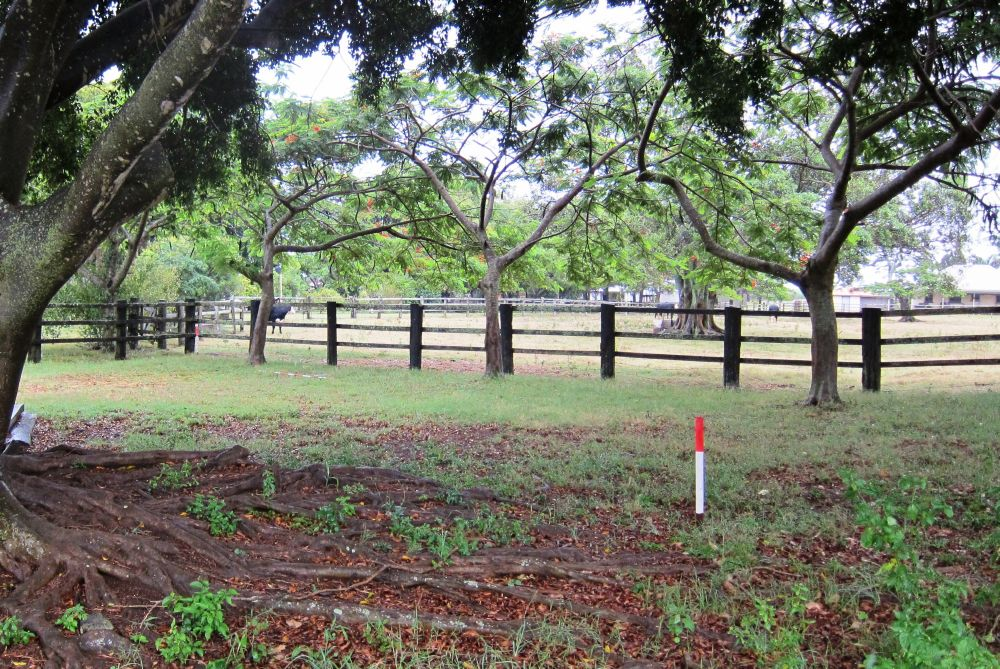
Burials area, 2013

The site of 29 South Sea Islander labourer burials mapped by Bundaberg Regional Council in 2012 is located about 50 metres (160 ft) to the south-east of the fig trees. The burials were mapped in three rows aligned approximately parallel to the lot boundaries. The northernmost row comprised 13 ground anomalies interpreted as burials. That to the south comprised 10 burials while that south again, 6 burials. A number of trees and post-and-rail fences stand within the area of the heritage boundary part that takes in these burials. These features are not considered to be of cultural heritage significance. Also identified in this area was a raised, linear ground feature believed to be part of a roadway-also known as a headland-dating from the sugar plantation era.

== Heritage listing ==
The former Sunnyside Sugar Plantation was listed on the Queensland Heritage Register on 13 May 1996 having satisfied the following criteria.

The place is important in demonstrating the evolution or pattern of Queensland's history.

The dry-rubble boundary wall and burial site on the former Sunnyside Sugar Plantation survive as important evidence of the enormous contribution made by South Sea Islanders to the establishment of a viable sugar industry in Queensland. In particular, they remain as testament to their contribution to the development of the sugar industry in the Bundaberg region, one of the major sugar districts in the state. The wall is also important physical evidence of the manual nature of this contribution, for without the availability of indentured labour, Woongarra Scrub farmers could not have converted their lands to an activity as initially labour-intensive as sugar growing.

The place demonstrates rare, uncommon or endangered aspects of Queensland's cultural heritage.

The boundary wall, which is approximately 200 metres (660 ft) in length, survives as one of the more intact examples of its type in the Bundaberg district, which around the turn of the century was chequered with such structures. In this sense it is rare.

The place has potential to yield information that will contribute to an understanding of Queensland's history.

The dry-rubble wall and burial site on the former Sunnyside Sugar Plantation are significant for their potential to contribute to further study and better understanding of the role of South Sea Islanders in the sugar industry and Queensland's history; and their burial practices, working conditions and health.

The place is important in demonstrating the principal characteristics of a particular class of cultural places.

Although diminished in length, what survives of the dry-rubble wall is substantially intact, and provides a good example of this type of construction employed in the Bundaberg district in the late 19th century.

The place has a strong or special association with a particular community or cultural group for social, cultural or spiritual reasons.

The South Sea Islander community of Bundaberg has indicated that this place facilitates a strong and special spiritual association with their ancestors who lived and worked on Sunnyside plantation.

The dry-rubble wall, two fig trees and burial site on the former Sunnyside represent a distinctive phase of Queensland's history and may potentially be used to illustrate events which have had a profound effect on the lives of descendants of the South Sea Islanders and of their communities.

The place has a special association with the life or work of a particular person, group or organisation of importance in Queensland's history.

The dry-rubble wall, fig trees and burial site at Sunnyside have an important association with the exploitation of the large South Sea Islander workforce employed in the Bundaberg district in the late 19th and early 20th centuries.
