= Woongarra =

Woongarra may refer to:

- Woongarra, Queensland, a locality in the Bundaberg Region, Australia
- Woongarra (Pemberton) railway line, a railway line in Queensland, Australia
- Shire of Woongarra, a former local government area in Queensland, Australia
