= Woongarra (Pemberton) railway line =

Former railway line in Queensland, Australia

The Woongarra Railway (so called as the majority of it was built by the Woongarra Shire Council) was a railway line from Bundaberg to Pemberton in Central Queensland, Australia.

The initial three kilometre section was privately built to link the Millaquin Sugar Refinery on the eastern outskirts of Bundaberg to the North Coast line, opening on 9 July 1894. It carried coal and sugar products and serviced the Millaquin sugar mill. A crossing of Saltwater Creek a short distance east of Bundaberg station was necessary, and sidings were located at Barolin Street, Tantitha Street and (later) Woongarra Junction.

Woongarra Shire Council funded a 20 km extension of the line further east via East Bundaberg, Bunda Street, Rubyanna, The Grange and Mon Repos to service a sugar mill at Qunaba (derived from Queensland National Bank), then south via Neilson Park, Bargara and Hollands to service mills at Windermere and Pemberton. The extension opened on 3 December 1912 at which point the Queensland Railways Department purchased the line as far as Woongarra Junction (located near the Millaquin mill).

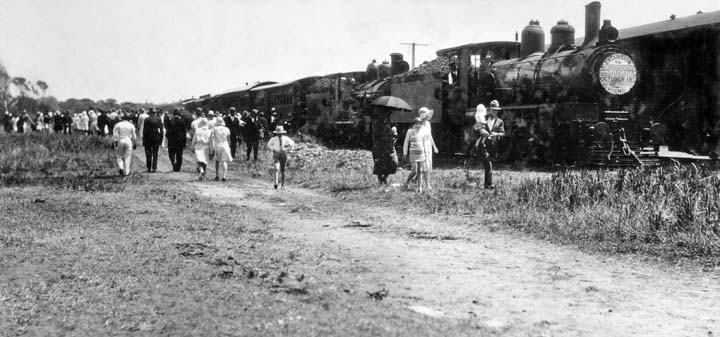
The arrival of an excursion train at Nielson Park, circa 1931

Neilson Park had a beach and with a railway connection soon became a popular seaside destination and "excursion" trains operated on the route.

Windermere and Pemberton mills were later closed and cane was railed to Qunaba for processing. Despite running at a loss, the Queensland Railways Department purchased the remainder of the line (from Woongarra Junction to Pemberton) on 1 January 1918.

In 1913, a stop en route at Sandhills was renamed Bargara derived by amalgamating the words Barolin and Woongarra. A daily rail motor operated between Bundaberg and Pemberton from 1919 to 1921 but thereafter only seaside trains ran during the summer months. As occurred elsewhere, road transport took over carriage of sugar cane.

A short spur from Qunaba would have brought the line to the new Bundaberg Port at the mouth of the Burnett River. However, sugar interests feared that rail strikes might interfere with production and road haulage to the port was preferred.

The line from Qunaba to Pemberton closed on 30 May 1948 and from Bunda Street (a short distance east of Woongarra Junction) to Qunaba closed on 1 August 1959. The line between Bundaberg and Bunda Street is closed but has since been lifted.

== See also ==
- Rail transport in Queensland
