= Bundaberg (disambiguation) =

Bundaberg is a city in Queensland, Australia

Bundaberg may also refer to:

- Bundaberg Airport, a regional airport serving Bundaberg, and used as a Royal Australian Air Force training base during World War II
- Bundaberg Base Hospital, a public hospital
- Bundaberg Brewed Drinks, an Australian soft drink manufacturer
- Bundaberg Central, Queensland, the suburb at the centre of Bundaberg
- Bundaberg Christian College, a private school
- Bundaberg East, Queensland, an eastern suburb of Bundaberg
- Bundaberg Hummock, a volcano remnant
- Bundaberg North, Queensland, a northern suburb of Bundaberg
- Bundaberg railway station
- Bundaberg Red Cup, a semi-professional rugby league competition based in New South Wales
- Bundaberg Red Racing, the commercial name for the V8 Supercar Walkinshaw Racing team
- Bundaberg Rum, a dark rum produced in Australia
  - 1936 Bundaberg distillery fire
  - Bundaberg Rum Stadium, the former, sponsorship-derived name for Cazaly's Stadium
  - Bundaberg Rum Test, the sponsorship-derived name for the ANZAC Test between 2004 and 2008
- Bundaberg Spirit, a team in the Queensland State League association football competition
- Bundaberg South, Queensland, a southern suburb of Bundaberg
- Bundaberg Regional Council, the local government area encompassing the city of Bundaberg from 2008
- Bundaberg West, Queensland, a western suburb of Bundaberg
- City of Bundaberg, the local government area encompassing the city of Bundaberg from 1902 to 2008
- Electoral district of Bundaberg, a state electoral district in Queensland
- HMAS Bundaberg, two ships of the Royal Australian Navy
