= Shire of Woongarra =

Coordinates: 24°52′13.15″S 152°20′43.8″E

Shire of Woongarra Queensland
- Population: 16,491 (1991 census)
  - Density: 22.8281/km^{2} (59.124/sq mi)
- Established: 1885
- Area: 722.4 km^{2} (278.9 sq mi)
- Council seat: Bundaberg
- Region: Wide Bay–Burnett
LGAs around Shire of Woongarra:
Gooburrum	Bundaberg	Pacific Ocean
Kolan	Shire of Woongarra	Pacific Ocean
Isis	Isis	Isis

The Shire of Woongarra was a local government area located to the south and east of the regional city of Bundaberg. The shire, administered from Bundaberg itself, covered an area of 722.4 square kilometres (278.9 sq mi), and existed as a local government entity from 1885 until 1994, when it amalgamated with Gooburrum to form the Shire of Burnett.

== History ==
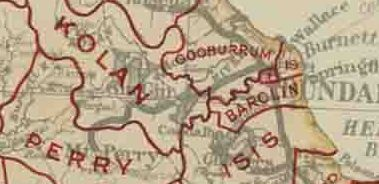
Map of Barolin Division and adjacent local government areas, March 1902. Legend: Bundaberg Municipality (1), Woongarra Division (19)

The Barolin Division was established on 11 November 1879 under the Divisional Boards Act 1879. On 30 October 1885, part of Barolin Division was separated to create Woongarra Division to serve the region south of the Burnett River.

With the passage of the Local Authorities Act 1902, Woongarra Division became the Shire of Woongarra on 31 March 1903, while Barolin Division became the Shire of Barolin.

In 1909, the Woongarra Shire had an area of 35½ square miles, with a population of 3200, with 736 ratepayers and a capital value of properties totalling £206,736. The rates collected in 1908 totalled £2378, and the loan indebtedness is £4956 9s 9d.

On 21 December 1917, the Shire of Barolin was dissolved and its area was split between the City of Bundaberg and the Shire of Woongarra.

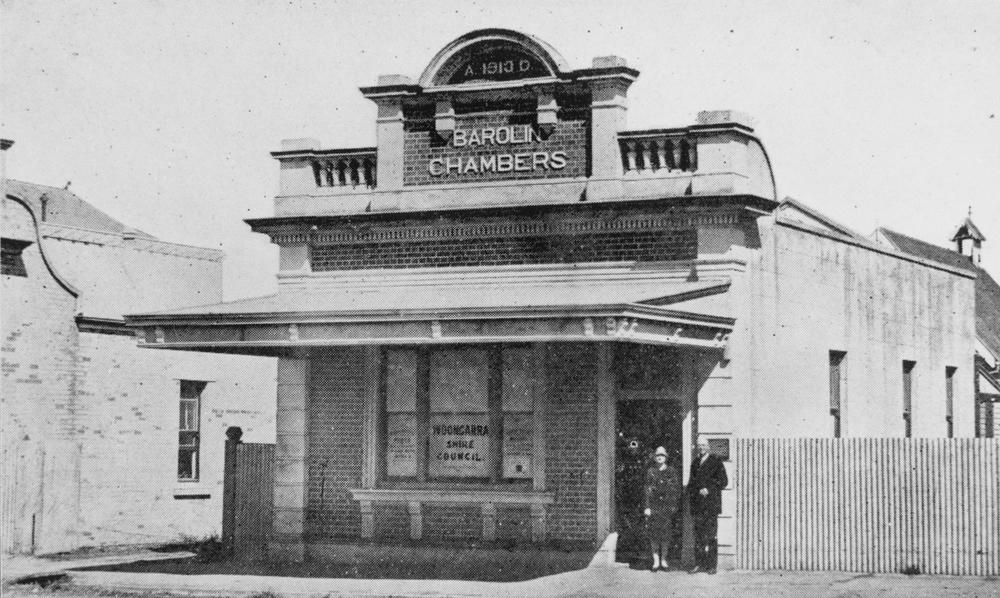
Barolin Chambers, Woongarra Shire Office, 1928 (built in 1913)

The Shire's offices were located in 9 Barolin Street, Bundaberg.

On 21 November 1991, the Electoral and Administrative Review Commission, created two years earlier, produced its second report, and recommended that local government boundaries in the Bundaberg area be rationalised. The Local Government (Bundaberg and Burnett) Regulation 1993 was gazetted on 17 December 1993, and on 30 March 1994, the Shire of Woongarra was amalgamated with the Shire of Gooburrum to form the Shire of Burnett.

== Towns and localities ==
- Alloway
- Ashfield
- Avoca
- Bargara
- Branyan
- Burnett Heads
- Calavos
- Coonarr
- Coral Cove
- Electra
- Elliott
- Elliott Heads
- Givelda
- Innes Park
- Kalkie
- Kensington
- Kepnock
- Kinkuna
- Millbank
- Mon Repos
- Pine Creek
- Port of Bundaberg
- Qunaba
- Rubyanna
- South Bingera
- Thabeban
- Windermere
- Woongarra

== Population ==
Year	Population
1921	2,513
1933	3,287
1947	3,345
1954	3,704
1961	4,149
1966	4,934
1971	5,150
1976	8,791
1981	9,865
1986	11,915
1991	16,491

== Chairmen ==
- 1885–1886 John Cran
- 1887–1889: J. Y. Walker
- 1890–1893 John Cran (again)
- 1894–1895 T. Williams
- 1897: John Cran (again)
- 1898: G. A. Waite
- 1905: W. J. Clements
- 1927: Robert Oswald Nowell Strathdee
