= Kalkie State School =

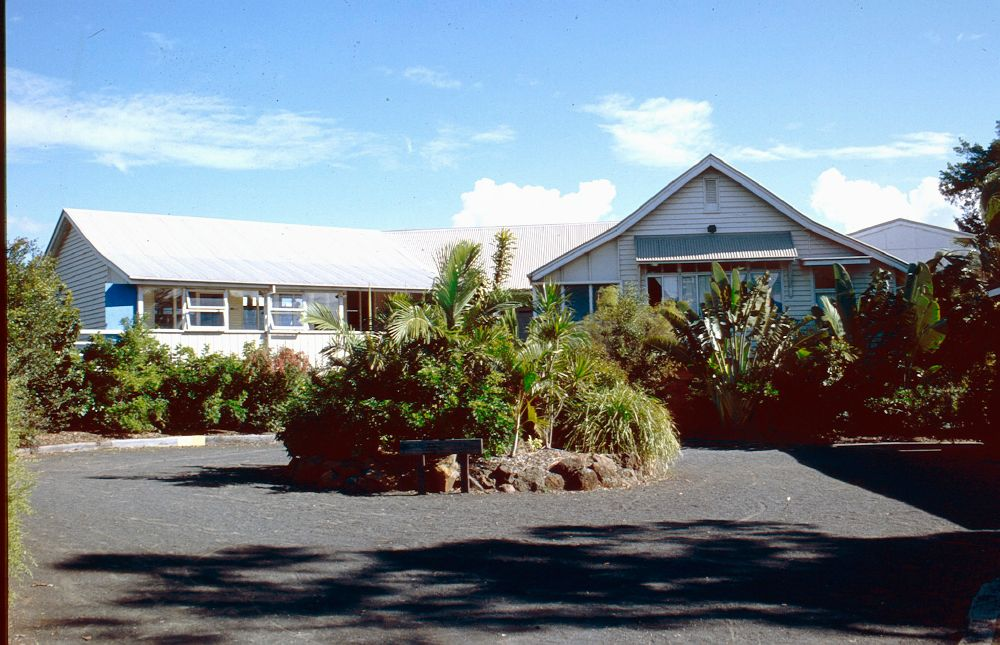
- Kalkie State School, 1994

- Location within Queensland Location within Australia
- 24.846°S 152.3973°E
- Location: 257 Bargara Road, Kalkie, Bundaberg Region, Queensland, Australia

History
- Design period: 1870s–1890s (late 19th century)
- Built: 1877–1937

Site notes
- Architect: Queensland Department of Public Works

Queensland Heritage Register
- Official name: Kalkie State School
- Type: state heritage (built, landscape)
- Designated: 21 October 1992
- Reference no.: 600971
- Significant period: 1870s (historical); 1870s–1930s (fabric school); 1870s–ongoing (social); 1930s (fabric residence)
- Significant components: play shed, trees of social, historic or special significance, school/school room
- Builders: Franz Kuhnel, William Starke

Kalkie State School is a heritage-listed state school at 257 Bargara Road, Kalkie, Bundaberg Region, Queensland, Australia. It was designed by the Queensland Department of Public Works and built in 1877 by Franz Kuhnel and William Starke. It was added to the Queensland Heritage Register on 21 October 1992.

== History ==
The earliest building at Kalkie State School was erected in 1877, with the playshed constructed in 1879–80. It was the first state school established in the Woongarra Scrub, and is the oldest school in Woongarra Shire. The playshed is one of the earliest surviving shingle-roofed playsheds in Queensland.

The school was established to serve the needs of the small farming community of Kalkie, which developed in the early 1870s in the heart of the Woongarra Scrub, about 4 miles (6.4 km) east of Bundaberg. The area was open to selection from 1869, following resumption of half of Branyan Station (taken up in 1855) for closer settlement under the 1868 Crown Lands Alienation Act. In the early 1870s, the area attracted a substantial number of British, German and Scandinavian families. In the early years the principal cash crop was maize, but in 1876 the price of maize fell by 600%, and by the early 1880s, the Kalkie/Woongarra farmers had turned to sugar. In 1882 the large Millaquin sugar refinery was established, and numerous juice mills, whose output was piped to the refinery, were erected in the Kalkie/Woongarra district in the following decade.

From its inception, the school served as a focus for a variety of community activities, including a meeting on 10 December 1879 in which prospective ratepayers of the Barolin Division, which encompassed the Woongarra scrub, agreed to seek permission to elect their first divisional board under the new Divisional Boards Act. Whether the first board met at the school subsequently has not been established.

In April 1875, Kalkie residents petitioned the Board of Education for the establishment of a national school in their district. Henry Easther, Secretary of the School Committee, offered a 5-acre site, to be surveyed from his homestead selection (portion 388, parish of Kalkie), for school purposes. The block was on a corner location, on the Sandhills Road (now Bargara Road). An alternative site, a little west along the Sandhills Road, was presented by a Mr Hermann, but in mid-1876 the district inspector for schools recommended Mr Easther's block, which had the advantage of dual road frontages. The committee was informed in November 1876 that their request for a school at Kalkie had been approved, subject to the conditions of the new Education Act of 1875, which stipulated that the school committee must raise one-fifth of the cost of construction. Subscriptions to the building fund were slow, with local farmers struggling to make a living from maize cropping. The school committee also appear to have been responsible for clearing the front half of the block, the whole of which was covered in dense scrub.

In November 1876, the new Department of Public Instruction requested the Department of Public Works to call tenders for a school and teacher's residence at Kalkie, to be based on plans then in preparation for a school at Wivenhoe, in the Brisbane Valley. Tenders were called in December 1876, but were considered too high. Subsequently, tenders were called in April 1877 for a combined school and residence, based on the plans then being prepared for Tallebuggera. The contract was let to Bundaberg builders Franz Kuhnel and William Starke, with a contract price of £375/12/- and construction period of 13 weeks. The building, which comprised a schoolroom 30 feet (9.1 m) long and an attached teacher's residence of 8 rooms at the rear, was erected on the southern corner of the block, with the schoolroom facing the Sandhills Road, and the residence facing the side road, which became known as School Lane (now Zielke Avenue). Both sections were constructed of weatherboards, set on timber stumps, and roofed with timber shingles (replaced in 1898 with galvanised iron). Construction was completed early in 1878, and the school opened on 11 February that year.

In October 1879, the School Committee informed the Department of Public Instruction that a subscription of £15 had been raised toward fencing and clearing the school grounds, and erecting a playshed. Tenders were called in November, and the contract let to H Hunt of Bundaberg. The price of the shingle-roofed playshed was £59, and the fencing consisted of 14.5 chains (960 ft; 290 m) of split two-rail fence, and 5.5 chains (360 ft; 110 m) of two-rail and paling fence, and 2.2 chains (150 ft; 44 m) of sawn batten fence with gates. Hunt's work was completed by March 1880. The fencing has since been replaced, but the playshed remains in its original location. The shingles on the northern end were replaced in 1970, as a combined Rotary and Kalkie P & C project, but those on the southern end may be original.

By 1884 the school, which had been erected to accommodate approximately 30 students, was grossly overcrowded, with an average attendance of 60 to 70. There was no verandah, and the head teacher was forced to accommodate pupils in the attached residence. Tenders for additions, comprising a 20-foot (6.1 m) classroom extension and a verandah 50 by 8 feet (15.2 by 2.4 m) along the length of the building, with a hat room and lavatory at each end, were called in late May 1884. Despite tenders being called, the work was let by private contract in June, for the price of £230, which was substantially lower than the tendered prices.

It appears that the Cook pines (Araucaria columellaris) near the playshed date to the 1880s.

In 1977–78, students who had attended Kalkie State School in the late 1890s recalled climbing these trees, which were then about 5 metres (16 ft) tall. The pines are native to French New Caledonia and surrounding islands, and may have some connection with the large South Sea Islander population brought to the Kalkie/Woongarra district in the 1880s and 1890s, to work on sugar cropping.

In 1900, the School Committee requested that the school be detached from the residence and removed to another part of the site, and the residence upgraded. This work was undertaken in 1906, with the school building re-located to the north, behind the playshed. A new verandah was added to the rear of the classroom block, with two new windows and a door cut into the wall to which the residence had been attached. Most of these and the original window openings were enlarged later, in the 1920s.

In 1934, the District Works Supervisor recommended that a new teacher's residence be provided, and that the school be extended with the addition of a standard teachers' room, 15 by 12 feet (4.6 by 3.7 m). Tenders for the new teachers' room and repairs and painting to the school building were called in mid-1935, and the contract was let to SJH Byrne of Bundaberg, with a price of £229. A southern wing was added later, probably in the 1940s, and the present staffroom was added in the early 1960s. These have been included in the heritage listing.

The new teacher's residence was finally erected in 1937, at a cost of approximately £1200. The second residence was erected in front of the 1877 house, where the schoolroom was located originally, facing the main road to Bundaberg. It was described as a standard Type 5 Teacher's Residence, constructed of timber and galvanised iron roofing, with 3 bedrooms, hall, bathroom, living room, dining verandah, kitchen, maid's room, front and side verandahs, a laundry under the house, an earth closet in the backyard, and two 1,000 imperial gallons (4,500 L; 1,200 US gal) tanks. At the request of the then head teacher, Arctic glass was substituted for plain glass specified for the windows. This building also is included in the heritage listing. In late 1937, the first residence was sold and removed from the site.

An expanding school population has necessitated the construction of a number of buildings and structures at Kalkie State School since the 1970s. These are not included in the heritage listing.

In 2014, Kalkie State School had an enrolment of 308 students with 29 teachers (24 full-time equivalent).

== Description ==
Kalkie State School, located on a level site on the western corner of Bargara Road and Zielke Avenue, includes an early school building, a playshed, groups of mature trees and a residence.

The early school building, consisting of two intersecting wings fronting Zielke Avenue to the northeast, is a two-storeyed weatherboard structure with tall concrete stumps and corrugated iron gable roofs. The ground level contains storage rooms and play areas with a concrete floor, while the first level has class rooms, offices and verandahs.

The northwest wing, separated from the angled intersecting eastern wing by verandah space, has undergone a number of changes and now contains a class room at either end with office and corridor space between. The western class room has diagonally boarded raked ceilings with exposed rafters and collar-beams, and the northern class room has boarded ceilings raked to collar-beam level and contains an enclosed section of the northwest verandah. Both rooms have louvred rectangular skylights, vertically jointed boarding to walls and a combination of aluminium framed louvres and timber casement and hopper windows.

The angled intersecting eastern wing contains a class room, principal's office, staff room and northern verandah. This wing has hardboard sheeting to walls and ceilings, and aluminium framed louvred and timber hopper windows.

The playshed, located to the south of the early school building behind the row of trees fronting Bargara Road, consists of a timber shingle gable roof with kick-out eaves to the boarded gable ends. The roof is supported by ten timber posts and has no ceiling with the roof structure visible. The playshed has a brick paved floor and perimeter bench seating.

The mature trees include four figs, two Cook pines and one camphor laurel to the Bargara Road frontage; two Cook Pines near the playshed; three figs to the northwest of the school and two figs to the Zielke Avenue frontage. The Cook Pines are exceptionally tall and narrow, and together with the fig trees, create a substantial local landmark.

The residence, located at the eastern corner of the site, is a two- storeyed weatherboard structure with tall concrete stumps and a hipped corrugated iron roof with projecting front gable above a bay window. The building has verandahs, which have been enclosed with insect screens, to the northeast and southeast with timber batten balustrades and angled timber brackets. The southwest elevation has casement windows and timber batten window hoods.

== Heritage listing ==
Kalkie State School was listed on the Queensland Heritage Register on 21 October 1992 having satisfied the following criteria.

The place is important in demonstrating the evolution or pattern of Queensland's history.

Kalkie State School is significant as the first state school established in the Woongarra Scrub, and as the oldest school in Woongarra Shire. The first classroom block, the original playshed, and the early plantings of Cook pines, figs and camphor laurel trees, are important for their association with the earliest establishment of the school. They also provide evidence of the initial development of the Kalkie area in the 1870s and 1880s.

The place demonstrates rare, uncommon or endangered aspects of Queensland's cultural heritage.

The playshed is a highly decorative example of its type, and is one of the earliest surviving shingle-roofed playsheds in Queensland.

The place is important in demonstrating the principal characteristics of a particular class of cultural places.

The residence is an intact example of an interwar Type 5 Teacher's Residence, which, together with the first school building, playshed and mature trees, form the nucleus of the school.

The place is important because of its aesthetic significance.

The Cook Pines, together with the group of fig trees, create an exceptional and substantial local landmark which also act as an identity marker for the school. The playshed and Cook Pines also form the school's focal point and are used to comprise the school's emblem.

The place has a strong or special association with a particular community or cultural group for social, cultural or spiritual reasons.

It has had a long association with the Kalkie/Woongarra community as the centre of local education and a focus for community activity.
