= Bundaberg Region =

Coordinates: 24°49′57.65″S 152°27′35.69″E

- Local government area
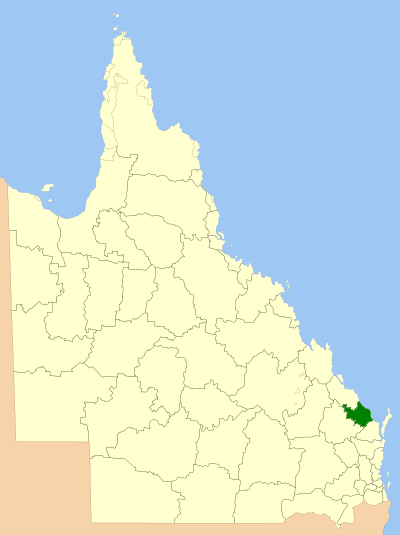
- Location within Queensland

- Interactive map of Bundaberg Region
- Country: Australia
- State: Queensland
- Region: Wide Bay–Burnett
- Established: 2008
- Council seat: Bundaberg

Government
  - Mayor: Helen Blackburn
  - State electorates: Bundaberg; Burnett; Callide
  - Federal divisions: Hinkler; Flynn

Area
  - Total: 6,431 km^{2} (2,483 sq mi)

Population
  - Total: 99,215 (2021 census)
  - Density: 15.4276/km^{2} (39.957/sq mi)
- Website: Bundaberg Region
LGAs around Bundaberg Region
Gladstone	Gladstone	Coral Sea
North Burnett	Bundaberg Region	Coral Sea
North Burnett	North Burnett	Fraser Coast

The Bundaberg Region is a local government area in the Wide Bay–Burnett region of Queensland, Australia, about 360 kilometres (220 mi) north of Brisbane, the state capital. It is centred on the city of Bundaberg, and also contains a significant rural area surrounding the city. It was created in 2008 from a merger of the City of Bundaberg with the Shires of Burnett, Isis and Kolan.

The Bundaberg Regional Council, which administers the Region, has an estimated operating budget of A$89 million.

In the 2021 census, the Bundaberg Region had a population of 99,215 people.

== History ==
Prior to the 2008 amalgamation, the Bundaberg Region existed as four distinct local government areas:

- the City of Bundaberg;
- the Shire of Burnett;
- the Shire of Isis;
- and the Shire of Kolan.

Local government in the Bundaberg area began on 11 November 1879 with the creation of 74 divisions around Queensland under the Divisional Boards Act 1879. These included the Barolin, Burrum and Kolan divisions.

The first eight years saw several areas break away and become self-governing due to increases in local population. The first was Bundaberg itself, which with an area of 4.1 square kilometres (1.6 sq mi) and a population of 1,192, split from Barolin on 22 April 1881 to form the Municipality of Bundaberg under the Local Government Act 1878. Areas to the south (Woongarra) and north (Gooburrum) of the Burnett River split from Kolan on 31 December 1885, and Barolin on 30 January 1886 respectively, while on 1 January 1887, the Isis Division further to the south split away from Burrum. Thus by 1887, the Municipality of Bundaberg and the Barolin, Gooburrum, Isis, Kolan and Woongarra Divisions covered the entire territory of what is now the Bundaberg Region.

On 31 March 1903, after the passage of the Local Authorities Act 1902, the Municipality became a Town while the Divisions became Shires. On 22 November 1913, Bundaberg was proclaimed a City.

On 21 December 1917, the Shire of Barolin was abolished and its area split between the City of Bundaberg and the Shire of Woongarra. Bundaberg grew to 45.2 square kilometres (17.5 sq mi) and was united with what was then its entire suburban extent.

On 21 November 1991, the Electoral and Administrative Review Commission, created two years earlier, produced its second report, and recommended that local government boundaries in the Bundaberg area be rationalised. The Local Government (Bundaberg and Burnett) Regulation 1993 was gazetted on 17 December 1993, and on 30 March 1994, the Shires of Gooburrum and Woongarra were abolished, with most transferred into a new Shire of Burnett. A portion of Woongarra was transferred to the City, more than doubling its area and increasing its population by 8,200 in 1991 census terms.

On 15 March 2008, under the Local Government (Reform Implementation) Act 2007 passed by the Parliament of Queensland on 10 August 2007, the City of Bundaberg merged with the Shires of Burnett, Isis and Kolan to form the Bundaberg Region.

== Divisions and councillors ==
Although the Commission recommended the council be undivided with ten councillors and a mayor, the gazetted form was that of 10 divisions each electing a single councillor, plus a mayor representing the whole region.

Those elected at the 2024 local government election were:

- Mayor: Helen Blackburn
- Division 1 Councillor: Jason Bartels
- Division 2 Councillor: Bill Trevor OAM
- Division 3 Councillor: Deb Keslake
- Division 4 Councillor: Tracey McPhee
- Division 5 Councillor: Larine Statham-Blair
- Division 6 Councillor: Carmen McEneany
- Division 7 Councillor: Gary Kirk
- Division 8 Councillor: Steve Cooper
- Division 9 Councillor: May Mitchell
- Division 10 Councillor: John Learmonth

== Mayors ==
Term start	Term end	Mayor	Notes
2008	May 2012	Lorraine Pyefinch	
May 2012	March 2016	Malcolm Foreman	
March 2016	March 2024	Jack Dempsey	
March 2024	current	Helen Blackburn	

== Suburbs ==
The Bundaberg Region includes the following settlements:

Inner Bundaberg area:

- Ashfield
- Avenell Heights
- Avoca
- Branyan
- Bundaberg Central
- Bundaberg East
- Bundaberg North
- Bundaberg South
- Bundaberg West
- Kensington
- Kepnock
- Millbank
- Norville
- Svensson Heights
- Thabeban
- Walkervale

Outer Bundaberg-Burnett area:

- Burnett Heads
- Mon Repos
- Bargara
- Coral Cove
- Elliott Heads
- Innes Park
- Kalkie
- Qunaba
- Rubyanna
- Windermere

Kolan area:

- Gin Gin
- Bullyard
- Bungadoo
- Dalysford
- Delan
- Gaeta
- Horse Camp
- Kalpowar
- Maroondan
- McIlwraith
- Moolboolaman
- Morganville
- Tirroan
- Wallaville

North and West Burnett area:

- Abbotsford
- Avondale
- Bucca
- Fairymead
- Gooburrum
- Littabella
- Meadowvale
- Miara
- Moore Park
- Moorland
- Oakwood
- Rosedale^{1}
- Sharon
- South Kolan
- Watalgan
- Waterloo
- Welcome Creek
- Winfield
- Yandaran

Isis area:

- Childers
- Apple Tree Creek
- Booyal
- Buxton
- Cordalba
- Doolbi
- Farnsfield
- Goodwood
- Horton
- Isis Central
- Kullogum
- North Isis
- Redridge
- South Isis
- Woodgate

Other Burnett area:

- Alloway
- Calavos
- Coonarr
- Electra
- Elliott
- Givelda
- Kinkuna
- Pine Creek
- Port of Bundaberg
- South Bingera
- Woongarra

^{1} – split with Gladstone Region

== Demographics ==
The populations given relate to the component entities prior to 2008.

Year	Population (Region total)	Population (Bundaberg)	Population (Gooburrum)	Population (Woongarra)	Population (Isis)	Population (Kolan)
1921	20,731	9,276	2,922	2,513	3,500	2,520
1933	25,387	11,466	3,915	3,287	3,778	2,941
1947	29,237	15,926	3,825	3,345	3,639	2,502
1954	34,531	19,951	4,131	3,704	4,243	2,502
1961	37,968	22,839	4,372	4,149	3,951	2,657
1966	41,444	25,402	4,776	4,934	3,718	2,614
1971	43,332	27,324	4,519	5,150	3,666	2,673
1976	51,084	30,456	5,227	8,791	3,926	2,684
1981	52,444	30,937	5,261	9,865	4,023	2,358
1986	55,990	31,427	5,917	11,915	4,082	2,649
1991	64,188	32,737*	7,117	16,491	4,825	3,018
1996	73,846	42,554	21,218		5,878	4,196
2001	77,323	43,146	23,598		6,045	4,534
2006	84,434	45,901	27,232		6,663	4,638
2011	89,810					
2016	93,897					
2021	99,215					

* The population of the 1996 area of Bundaberg in 1991 was 41,219.

== Libraries ==
The Bundaberg Regional Council operate public libraries in Bundaberg Central, Childers, Gin Gin, and Woodgate Beach.
