= Ashfield, Queensland =

Ashfield Bundaberg, Queensland
- Coordinates: 24.8719°S 152.3983°E
- Population: 1,152 (2021 census)
  - Density: 235.1/km^{2} (609/sq mi)
- Postcode(s): 4670
- Area: 4.9 km^{2} (1.9 sq mi)
- Time zone: AEST (UTC+10:00)
- Location: 6.2 km (4 mi) E of Bundaberg CBD; 317 km (197 mi) SE of Rockhampton; 361 km (224 mi) N of Brisbane
- LGA(s): Bundaberg Region
- State electorate(s): Bundaberg
- Federal division(s): Hinkler
Suburbs around Ashfield:
Bundaberg East	Kalkie	Rubyanna
Kepnock	Ashfield	Windermere
Avenell Heights	Woongarra	Woongarra

Ashfield is a mixed residential and rural locality in the Bundaberg Region, Queensland, Australia. In the 2021 census, Ashfield had a population of 1,152 people.

== Geography ==
Ashfield is on the eastern edge of the city of Bundaberg, approximately 6.2 kilometres (3.9 mi) by road from Bundaberg CBD, 10.7 kilometres (6.6 mi) by road from the coastal town of Bargara and 361 kilometres (224 mi) by road from the state capital Brisbane. It is bordered by Kalkie to the North, Windermere to the East, Woongarra to the South and Kepnock to the West.

The suburb covers an area of approximately 4.9 square kilometres, and comprises two public parks that represent nearly 1.4% of the land area.

While still a rural locality with some farming areas, residential development is growing in the west with construction of three suburban estates. The farming and residential districts are serviced by the Bundaberg Ring-Road to the suburb's west, and a 15-minute drive to the regional Bundaberg Airport.

The Woongarra Main Water Channel runs through the center of the locality from west-to-east, providing one of few sources of water supply to the city.

== History ==
The Apostolic Church of Queensland commenced in Bundaberg in 1890, opening their first church on Ashfield Road in 1896. On 26 June 1958, a new Apostolic Cathedral was officially opened on the site.

Bundaberg Christian College opened in 1996.

== Demographics ==
In the 2011 census, Ashfield had a population of 446 people.

In the 2016 census, Ashfield had a population of 793 people.

In the 2021 census, Ashfield had a population of 1,152 people.

== Education ==
Bundaberg Christian College is a private primary and secondary (Prep-12) school for boys and girls at 234 Ashfield Road (24.8677°S 152.4075°E). In 2018, the school had an enrolment of 581 students with 57 teachers (45 full-time equivalent) and 40 non-teaching staff (27 full-time equivalent). It also provides early child care services from ages of 15 months to school age through the Chrysalis Early Learning Centre located alongside the P-12 campus on Ashfield Road.

There are no government schools in Ashfield. The nearest government primary schools are Bundaberg East State School in neighbouring Bundaberg East to the north-west, Kalkie State School in neighbouring Kalkie to the north, Woongarra State School in neighbouring Woongarra to the south, and Walkervale State School in Walkervale to the west. The nearest government secondary school is Kepnock State High School in neighbouring Kepnock to the west.

== Facilities ==
Although located in the suburb of Windermere, Ashfield is serviced by the Ashfield Country Practice; a mixed billing General Practice located at 279 Ashfield Road, Windermere. The region's House Call Doctor provides home health care services to Ashfield and the greater Bundaberg local area.

== Amenities ==
The Bundaberg Apostolic Church is located in the suburb's east at 302-316 Ashfield Road (24.8736°S 152.4107°E). It is the cathedral for the Northern Apostle District.

== Transport ==
Major Roads include the Bundaberg Ring-Road, Ashfield Road, Elliott Heads Road and FE Walker Street.

Ashfield is serviced by a number of bus routes, including:

- 41AM Service: East Bundaberg; Kalkie; Belle Eden; Kepnock
- 41PM Service: Norville; City; East; Kalkie; Kepnock; Belle Eden
