= Burnett Heads, Queensland =

Burnett Heads
- Town
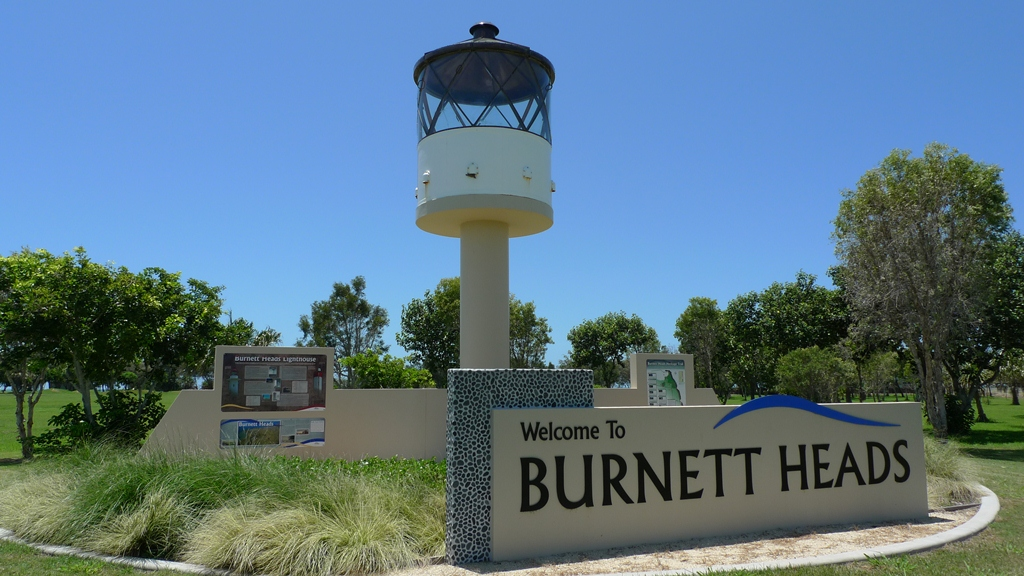
- Entering Burnett Heads

- Interactive map of Burnett Heads
- Coordinates: 24.7741°S 152.4172°E
- Country: Australia
- State: Queensland
- LGA: Bundaberg Region
- Location: 10.1 km (6.3 mi) NNW of Bargara; 17 km (11 mi) NE of Bundaberg; 374 km (232 mi) N of Brisbane

Government
  - State electorate: Burnett
  - Federal division: Hinkler

Area
  - Total: 17.7 km^{2} (6.8 sq mi)

Population
  - Total: 2,908 (2021 census)
  - Density: 164.3/km^{2} (425.5/sq mi)
- Time zone: UTC+10:00 (AEST)
- Postcode: 4670
Localities around Burnett Heads
Fairymead	Coral Sea	Coral Sea
Fairymead	Burnett Heads	Coral Sea
Rubyanna	Qunaba	Mon Repos

Burnett Heads is a coastal town and locality in the Bundaberg Region, Queensland, Australia. In the 2021 census, the locality of Burnett Heads had a population of 2,908 people.

== Geography ==
The locality of Burnett Heads is on the southern side of the Burnett River at its mouth into the Coral Sea.The river forms the western and northern boundaries, while the ocean forms most of the eastern boundary.

The land use is a mixture of residential (mostly with proximity to the coast), industrial (mostly the Port of Bundaberg) and some agricultural use (growing sugarcane). There is a network of cane tramways to transport the harvested sugarcane to the Millaquin sugar mill for processing.

== History ==
The Barolin run was leased by Alfred Henry Brown from 1862. This was on a coastal strip of the Barolin Plain which stretched from the southern side of the Burnett River to the northern side of the Elliott River.

Burnett Heads Provisional School opened on 3 April 1878. On 17 September 1888, it became Burnett Heads State School.

In February 1883, land surveyed by Charlton and Gardiner, licensed surveyors, in the township of New Bundaberg was offered for sale in the Victoria Hall, Bundaberg. The locality map advertising the sale also shows land in the Barolin Marine Township Estate to be offered for sale on the same day. The same map shows the lighthouse, pilot station and public telegraph office at South Head. New Bundaberg is now Port Bundaberg and the Barolin Marine Township Estate is the current Burnett Heads township. Both townships are part of the current Burnett Heads locality.

The Maryborough Chronicle later reported that the New Bundaberg town allotments sold well, recording the buyers and prices paid while the Barolin estate did not sell so well on the day. The auction was conducted three auctioneers: Bryant and Co., John Cameron and W. E. Curtis.

In 1883, the Maryborough Barolin Syndicate proposed to build a private tramline and railway station from New Bundaberg to connect with the terminus of the Bundaberg and Burrum railway. In 1884 the New Bundaberg Land, Building, and Investment Co., Limited acquired the rights to the land reserved for that purpose. The tramline did not eventuate.

In 1917, New Bundaberg was described as a mosquito Infested swamp.

Methodist services were held at the Burnett Heads State School, until the Burnett Heads Methodist Church was opened on Thursday 6 August 1903. It was on the eastern side of Burnett Heads Road halfway down the school hill. In 1967, it was relocated to its present site in Zunker Street. In 1977, the Methodist Church entered into an amalgamation to create the Uniting Church in Australia; the church then became known as Burnett Heads Uniting Church.

Burnett Heads Post Office opened by 1919 (a receiving office had been open from 1888), closed in 1924 and reopened around 1942.

On Sunday 3 May 1931, Archbishop James Duhig consecrated a new Roman Catholic Church in Burnett Heads. It was entirely funded by the Zunker family in memory of their dead parents. Over 1000 people attended the ceremony. It was closed and sold in 1991 and has been demolished. It was at 33 Zunker Street (24.76344°S 152.40572°E).

Archbishop William Wand laid the foundation stone for St John the Divine Anglican Church on Sunday 6 August 1939. The land for the church had been donated by Christian Mittleheuser. The church was consecrated on Sunday 4 February 1940 by Bishop Dixon.

In 1958, the Port of Bundaberg was established at Burnett Heads to better support the sugar industry and the larger ships being employed. The port of Bundaberg originally operated from the town reach of the Burnett River at Bundaberg with the Bundaberg Harbour Board being established in 1895. A major dredging project was undertaken in 2001 to cater for even larger vessels.

== Demographics ==
In the 2016 census, the locality of Burnett Heads had a population of 2,656 people. Aboriginal and Torres Strait Islander people made up 3.8% of the population. 80.5% of people were born in Australia. The next most common country of birth was England at 4.0. 91.9% of people spoke only English at home. The most common responses for religion were No Religion 31.0%, Anglican 22.5%, Catholic 16.3% and Uniting Church 7.7%.

In the 2021 census, the locality of Burnett Heads had a population of 2,908 people.

== Heritage ==
The town's most notable feature is its historic timber lighthouse, the Old Burnett Heads Light, dating from 1873. The structure, originally sited on South Head (the southern entrance to the Burnett River), was replaced by a modern structure in 1971; the original lighthouse was restored and moved to a local park off Mittelheuser Street. It includes the original Fresnel lens.

== Economy ==
The Port of Bundaberg is located on the Burnett River at Wharf Drive (24.771°S 152.383°E). It is operated by Gladstone Ports Corporation. It has two wharves:

- Sir Thomas Hiley Wharf for sugar, gypsum, wood pellets, bulk liquids, molasses and formerly silica sand.
- John T. Fisher Wharf for molasses imports, but is no longer in use due to aged wooden wharf needing major works, all imports and exports are handled by the Sir Thomas Hiley Wharf, there is however plans to repurpose the John T Fisher Wharf so it can be used to load items such as woodchip etc.

== Education ==
Burnett Heads State School is a government primary (Prep-6) school for boys and girls at 52 Burnett Heads Road (24.7717°S 152.4145°E). In 2018, the school had an enrolment of 146 students with 11 teachers (9 full-time equivalent) and 13 non-teaching staff (8 full-time equivalent).

There are no government secondary schools in Burnett Heads. The nearest government secondary school is Kepnock State High School in Kepnock to the south-east.

== Facilities ==
Burnett Heads Fire Station is at 15 Brewer Street (24.7639°S 152.4100°E).

Burnett Heads SES Facility is at 13 Brewer Street beside the fire station (24.7637°S 152.4100°E).

Volunteer Marine Rescue Bundaberg has its base at 51 Harbour Esplanade (24.7608°S 152.4014°E). Its area of coverage is approximately 4,000 square nautical miles (14,000 km^{2}; 5,300 sq mi) off the Central Queensland coast from Fairfax Islands (23.856°S 152.371°E) to the north, to Burrum River (25.179°S 152.614°E) to the south, and to the ocean side of Fraser Island (approx 24.694°S 153.295°E) to the east.

== Amenities ==
St John the Divine Anglican Church is at 1 Paul Mittelheuser Street (24.7634°S 152.4080°E). A service is held every Saturday.

Burnett Heads Uniting Church is at 14 Zunker Street (24.7648°S 152.4113°E). A service is held every Sunday morning.

There are a number of parks in the area:

- 4BU Park (24.7620°S 152.4017°E)
- Abberton Park (24.7765°S 152.3893°E)
- Dorothea Mackellar Park (24.7793°S 152.4202°E)
- Gorman Park (24.7606°S 152.4106°E)
- Jack Strathdee Memorial Park (24.7640°S 152.4151°E)
- Memorial Park (24.7636°S 152.4037°E)
- Pilot Station Reserve (24.7617°S 152.4139°E)
- QCWA Park (24.7637°S 152.4086°E)
- Simpson Park (24.7755°S 152.4167°E)

== Events ==
In recognition of its lighthouses, Burnett Heads stages the annual Lighthouse Festival on the last Saturday in October.
