= Kalkie, Queensland =

Kalkie Bundaberg, Queensland
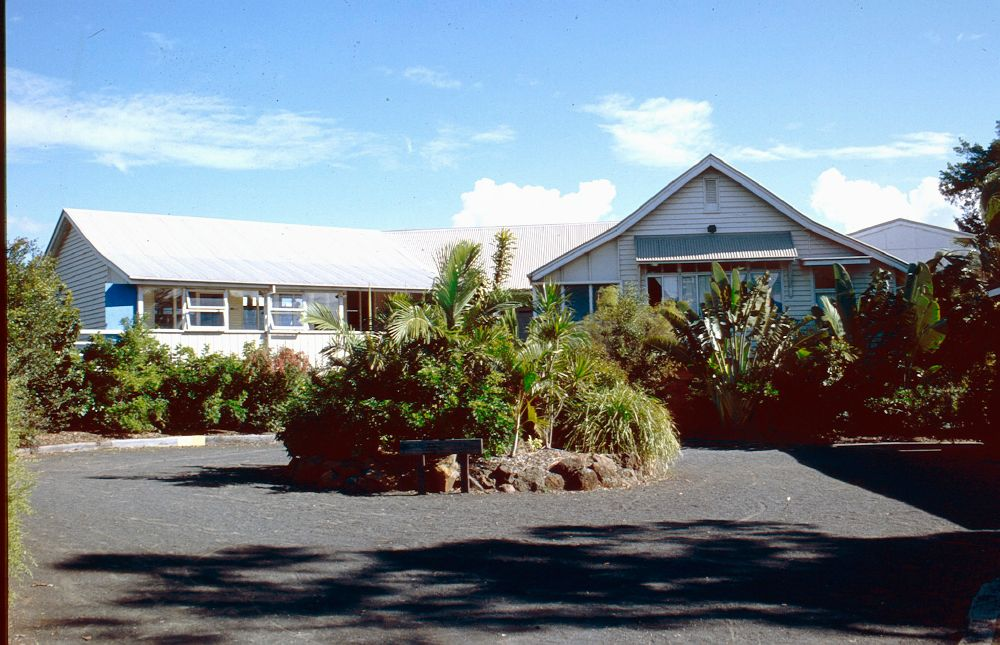
- Kalkie State School (1994)

- Coordinates: 24.8455°S 152.3858°E
- Population: 2,968 (2021 census)
  - Density: 322.6/km^{2} (836/sq mi)
- Postcode(s): 4670
- Area: 9.2 km^{2} (3.6 sq mi)
- Time zone: AEST (UTC+10:00)
- Location: 5.3 km (3 mi) ENE of Bundaberg; 292 km (181 mi) SE of Rockhampton; 367 km (228 mi) N of Brisbane
- LGA(s): Bundaberg Region
- State electorate(s): Bundaberg
- Federal division(s): Hinkler
Suburbs around Kalkie:
Gooburrum	Rubyanna	Rubyanna
Bundaberg North	Kalkie	Rubyanna
Bundaberg East	Ashfield	Windermere

Kalkie is a suburb of Bundaberg in the Bundaberg Region, Queensland, Australia. In the 2021 census, Kalkie had a population of 2,968 people.

== Geography ==
Kalkie is bounded to the west by the Burnett River.

The Bundaberg-Bargara Road runs through from west to east, and the Bundaberg-Port Road runs along the southern boundary.

== History ==
Kalkie State School opened on 11 February 1878.

A Primitive Methodist church was built at South Kalkie in 1878. Thirty years later it was relocated to Seaview Road, Bargara.

A Primitive Methodist church was built in Kalkie on Sunday 4 August 1878. It was sold many years later.

St Luke's Anglican School opened in 1994.

== Demographics ==
In the 2011 census, Kalkie had a population of 2,410 people.

In the 2016 census, Kalkie had a population of 2,692 people.

In the 2021 census, Kalkie had a population of 2,968 people.

== Heritage listings ==
Kalkie has a number of heritage-listed properties, including:

- Kalkie State School, 257 Bargara Road

== Education ==
Kalkie State School is a government primary (Prep-6) school for boys and girls at 257 Bargara Road (24.8464°S 152.3974°E). In 2018, the school had an enrolment of 235 students with 22 teachers (19 full-time equivalent) and 20 non-teaching staff (11 full-time equivalent). It includes a special education program.

St Luke's Anglican School is a private primary and secondary (Prep-12) school for boys and girls at 4 Mezger Street (24.8526°S 152.3849°E). In 2018, the school had an enrolment of 717 students with 58 teachers (56 full-time equivalent) and 42 non-teaching staff (35 full-time equivalent).

There is no government secondary school in Kalkie. The nearest government secondary school is Kepnock State High School in Kepnock to the south.

== In popular culture ==
Kalkie inspired the iconic Australian song, Sounds of Then (This is Australia), by Gang Gajang.
