= Bundaberg Christian College =

Coordinates: 24°52′04.52″S 152°24′24.83″E

- Bundaberg, Queensland; Australia

Information
- Type: Private
- Motto: Education with Wisdom
- Established: 1996
- Principal: Brendan Hosking
- Enrolment: 954 (2026)
- Campus: 234 Ashfield Road, Ashfield 4670
- Colours: Navy blue, pacific aqua
- Website: www.bcc.net.au

Bundaberg Christian College (BCC) is an independent, non-denominational Christian, co-educational, P-12, school, in the suburb of Ashfield in the city of Bundaberg, in Queensland, Australia. It is administered by Independent Schools Queensland, with an enrolment of 954 students and a teaching staff of 109, as of 2026.

In 2026 the College celebrates its 30th year in providing Christian education to the Bundaberg Region.

== History ==
The school opened on 1 January 1996.

In 2016, the school installed the largest hybrid solar system in Australia at the time, with exactly 740 solar panels, and approximately 170 batteries, with 200KW battery storage.

2022 saw the expansion of the Junior School, with the Prep to Year 6 cohort being designated in one section of the school, which had not occurred in 15 years.

In 2025, the College officially opened its new sports complex and commenced development on a dedicated performing arts and library precinct, alongside upgrades to the existing multipurpose hall.

2026, the College celebrates its 30th Anniversary.

== Cultural ==
Bundaberg Christian College has been involved in many cultural events including Eisteddfods and sporting events. The school has many bands including Junior, Senior, Year 5 and Stage, many choirs including Junior, Senior and Voiceworx and many orchestras including Junior, Senior, Year 4 and Year 8 Chamber. A stringed instrument is compulsory in Year 4 and a brass or woodwind in Year 5. In Year 6+ students have the option of learning percussion instruments.

== Discipline ==
The school had a policy of corporal punishment until mid-2012, making it one of the last schools in Queensland to use this form of discipline. Paddling or caning was given for "serious verbal or physical abuse, theft or misbehaviour". In 2008 the school's paddle was used, with parental agreement, on 10 occasions, and 7 occasions the previous year.

== See also ==
- List of schools in Queensland
