= St Luke's Anglican School =

Location
- 4 Mezger Street, Kalkie, Bundaberg, Queensland; Australia; 24°51′14″S 152°23′16″E

Information
- Type: Independent co-educational early learning, primary and secondary day school
- Motto: Faith, Performance, Honour
- Religious affiliation: Anglicanism
- Denomination: Anglican
- Established: 1994; 32 years ago
- Principal: Matthew Hughes
- Head teacher: Catherine Donaldson (Early Learning Centre) Tonia Lassman (Primary School) Mark Fancourt (Middle School) Robyn Deer (Senior School)
- Years: Early learning to Prep–12
- Enrolment: 1000
- Language: English
- Colours: Blue, green, red and yellow
- Website: www.stlukes.qld.edu.au

St Luke's Anglican School is an independent Anglican co-educational early learning, primary and secondary day school located in Bundaberg, Queensland, Australia.

Established in 1994 and includes an Early Learning Centre (Junior, Kindy, and Pre-Prep), and Primary School, Middle School, and Senior School. The school's motto is Faith, Performance, Honour.

== International students ==
St Luke's Anglican School accepts international students from diverse range(s of) cultures. They are registered to accept students who are studying on a 500 Student Visa from Year 1–12. St Luke's also offers support and accommodation with the homestay program. All international students under the age of 18 are required by law to live with their parents/guardians or with a school approved Homestay Provider.

== Houses ==
The college has four houses that compete throughout the year with each other in cultural and sporting competitions. The main events are the yearly: swimming carnival, athletics carnival, cross country carnival and the rock-pop-mime which is hosted by the Year 12 students.

The houses (with house colours) that compete are as follows:

- Hoog House
- Morris House
- Browning House
- Noble House

The house colours are taken from the school's coat of arms. The houses are named after important figures in the Australian Anglican Church.

== See also ==
- List of schools in Queensland
- List of Anglican schools in Australia
- Schools in Bundaberg
