= Windermere, Queensland =

Windermere
- Suburb
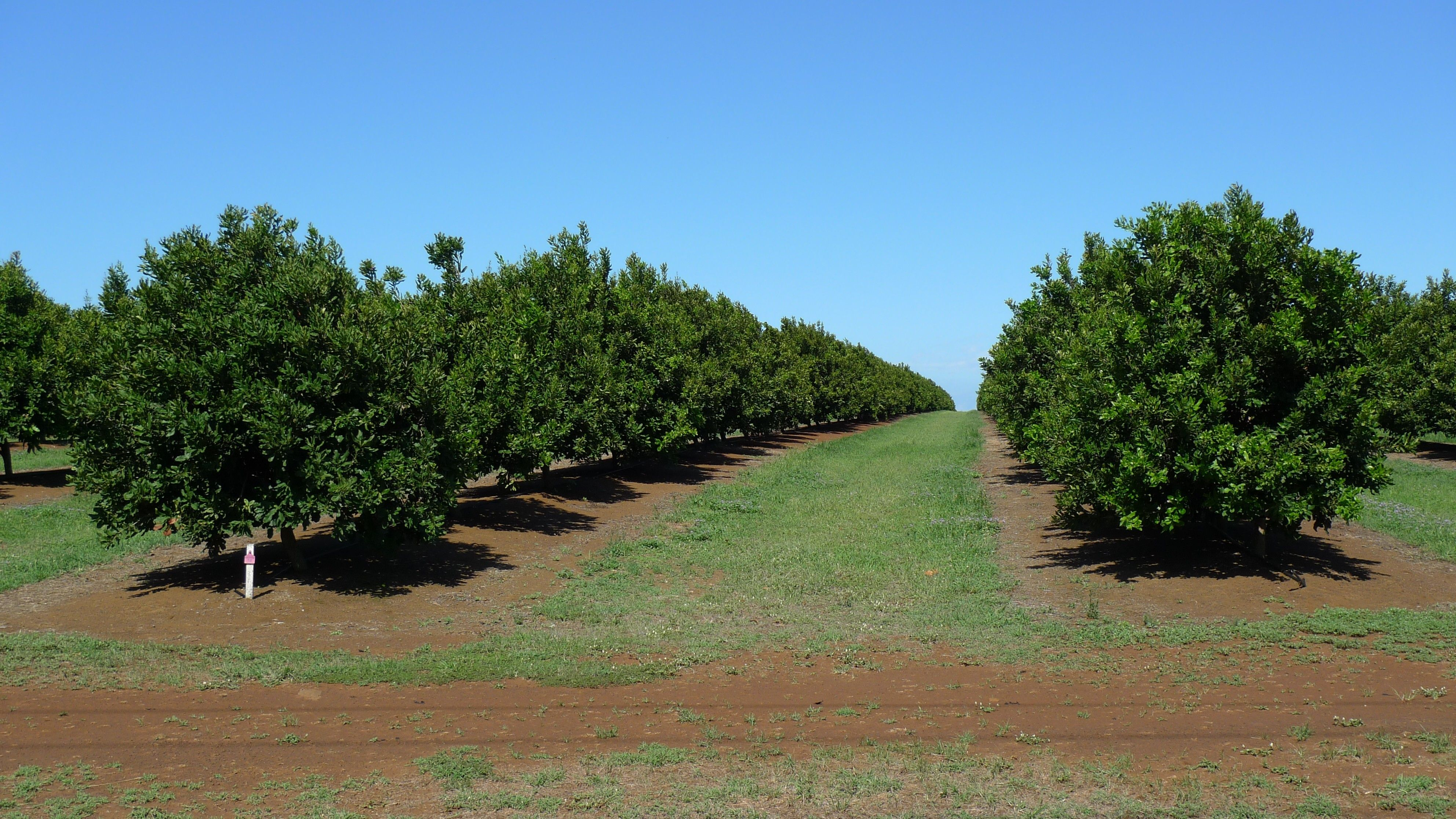
- Windermere macadamia plantation, 2012

- Interactive map of Windermere
- Coordinates: 24.8602°S 152.4338°E
- Country: Australia
- State: Queensland
- LGA: Bundaberg Region
- Location: 9.2 km (5.7 mi) E of Bundaberg CBD; 361 km (224 mi) N of Brisbane

Government
  - State electorate: Burnett
  - Federal division: Hinkler

Area
  - Total: 12.0 km^{2} (4.6 sq mi)

Population
  - Total: 188 (2021 census)
  - Density: 15.67/km^{2} (40.58/sq mi)
- Time zone: UTC+10:00 (AEST)
- Postcode: 4670
Suburbs around Windermere
| Qunaba | Qunaba | Bargara |
| Kalkie; Rubyanna; Ashfield | Windermere | Innes Park |
| Woongarra | Woongarra | Woongarra |

Windermere is a rural locality in the Bundaberg Region, Queensland, Australia. In the 2021 census, Windermere had a population of 188 people.

== Geography ==
Pemberton is a neighbourhood in the south of the locality (24.8666°S 152.45°E).

== History ==
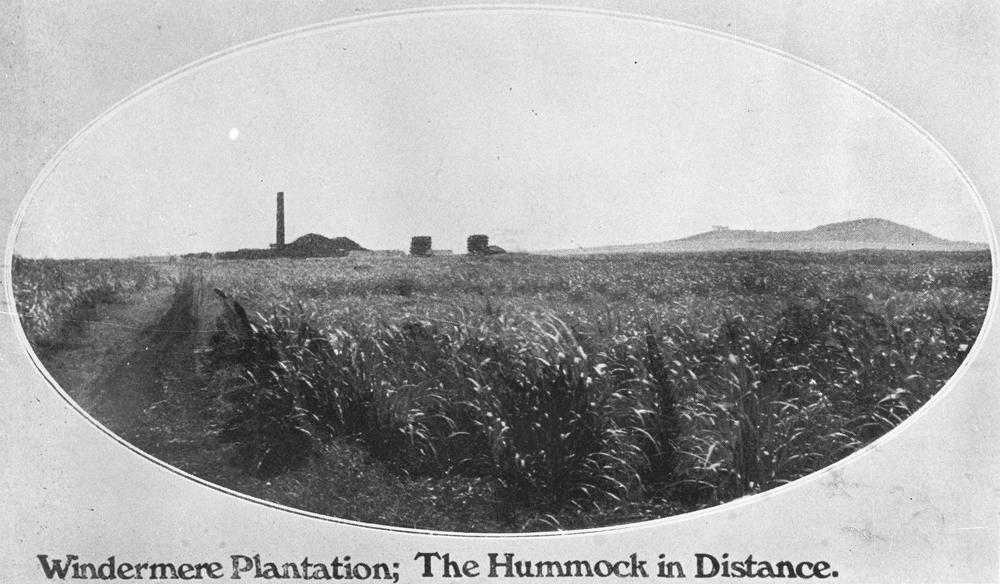
Windermere Mill with the Hummock in the background, 1907

Barolin Provisional School opened in 1884. On 1 November 1886, it became Barolin State School. It closed in 1974. It was at 14 School Lane (24.8672°S 152.4467°E) on the north-west corner of its intersection with Elliott Heads Road.

In 1995, the Coral Coast Christian Church congregation was established from the Bundaberg Baptist Church. In 2000 the church building was erected.

== Demographics ==
In the 2016 census, Windermere had a population of 184 people.

In the 2021 census, Windermere had a population of 188 people.

== Heritage listings ==
Windermere has a number of heritage-listed sites, including:

- Sunnyside Sugar Plantation, 94 Windermere Road

== Education ==
There are no schools in Windermere. The nearest government primary schools are Woongarra State School in neighbouring Woongarra to the south-west, Kalkie State School in neighbouring Kalkie to the north-west, and Bargara State School in Mon Repos to the north. The nearest government secondary school is Kepnock State High School in Kepnock to the south-west.

== Amenities ==
Coral Coast Christian Church is at 596 Windermere Road (24.8491°S 152.4617°E).

== Facilities ==
Innes Park SES Facility is in School Lane (24.8673°S 152.4463°E).
