= Rubyanna, Queensland =

Rubyanna Bundaberg, Queensland
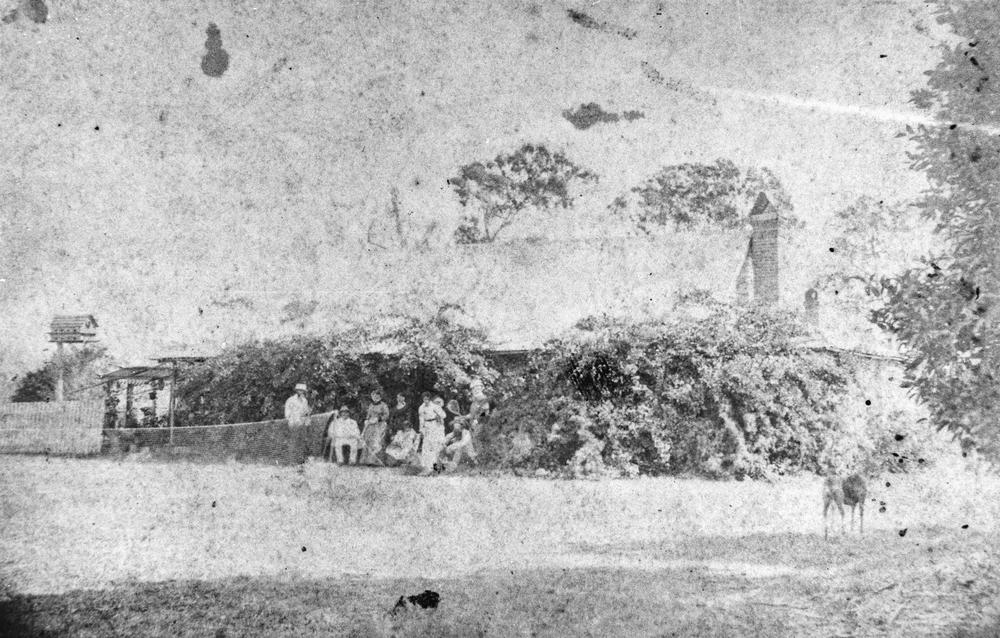
- Sugar Plantation, Rubyanna, 1880s

- Coordinates: 24.8250°S 152.3877°E
- Population: 257 (2021 census)
  - Density: 11.79/km^{2} (30.53/sq mi)
- Postcode(s): 4670
- Area: 21.8 km^{2} (8.4 sq mi)
- Time zone: AEST (UTC+10:00)
- Location: 10.5 km (7 mi) NE of Bundaberg CBD; 368 km (229 mi) N of Brisbane
- LGA(s): Bundaberg Region
- State electorate(s): Burnett
- Federal division(s): Hinkler
Suburbs around Rubyanna:
| Fairymead | Burnett Heads | Burnett Heads |
| Gooburrum | Rubyanna | Qunaba |
| Kalkie | Ashfield | Windermere |

Rubyanna is a rural locality in the Bundaberg Region, Queensland, Australia. In the 2021 census, Rubyanna had a population of 257 people.

== Geography ==
The Bundaberg-Bargara Road runs through the southern tip from west to east, and the Bundaberg-Port Road runs along the eastern and northern boundaries.

== History ==
The name Rubyanna comes from the sugarcane plantation of surveyor John Charlton Thompson, whose plantation was supposedly named for his wife, but this claim has been questioned as his wife's name was Hannah Elizabeth (née Breeze).

Rubyanna Provisional School opened circa 1899. In 1904, the school was commended by the school inspector for its "effective discipline, sound progress, and satisfactory general condition". It closed in 1905. It was on the Rubyanna sugar plantation (approx 24.81790°S 152.38896°E).

== Demographics ==
In the 2016 census, Rubyanna had a population of 244 people.

In the 2021 census, Rubyanna had a population of 257 people.

== Education ==
There are no schools in Rubyanna. The nearest government primary schools are:

- Kalkie State School in neighbouring Kalkie to the south-west
- Bargara State School in Mon Repos to the east
- Burnett Heads State School in neighbouring Burnett Heads to the north
- Bundaberg East State School in Bundaberg East to the south-west

The nearest government secondary school is Kepnock State High School in Kepnock to the south.

== Amenities ==
Bundaberg Bible Church is at 400 Bargara Road (24.8429°S 152.4079°E).

There is a boat ramp at Four Knots Point, off Strathdees Road on the south bank of Burnett River (24.7972°S 152.3839°E). It is managed by the Bundaberg Regional Council.
