= Shire of Barolin =

Local government area of Queensland, Australia

Coordinates: 24.9459°S 152.268°E

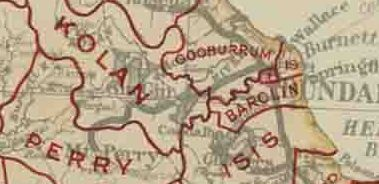
Map of Barolin Division and adjacent local government areas, March 1920. Legend: Bundaberg Municipality (1), Woongarra Division (19)

The Shire of Barolin was a local government area located in the Wide Bay–Burnett region of Queensland, Australia. It was the area south of the Burnett River but excluding the urban area of Bundaberg which was initially in Bundaberg Division. It existed from 1879 to 1917.

== History ==
The Barolin Division was one of the original divisions, established on 11 November 1879 under the Divisional Boards Act 1879 with a population of 1051.

On 30 October 1885, part of Barolin Division was separated to create Woongarra Division to serve the region south of the Burnett River.

On 31 March 1903, with the passage of the Local Authorities Act 1902, the Barolin Division became the Shire of Barolin, while the Woongarra Division became the Shire of Woongarra.

In 1909, the Barolin Shire had an area of 226 square miles, a population of 1655, and 671 ratepayers. The receipt from rates in 1908 was £1330, and the indebtedness to the Government totals £1567, the annual repayment due being £419.

On 21 December 1917, the Shire of Barolin was dissolved and its area was split between the City of Bundaberg and the Shire of Woongarra.
