= Bargara, Queensland =

Suburb of Bundaberg, Australia

Bargara
- Town
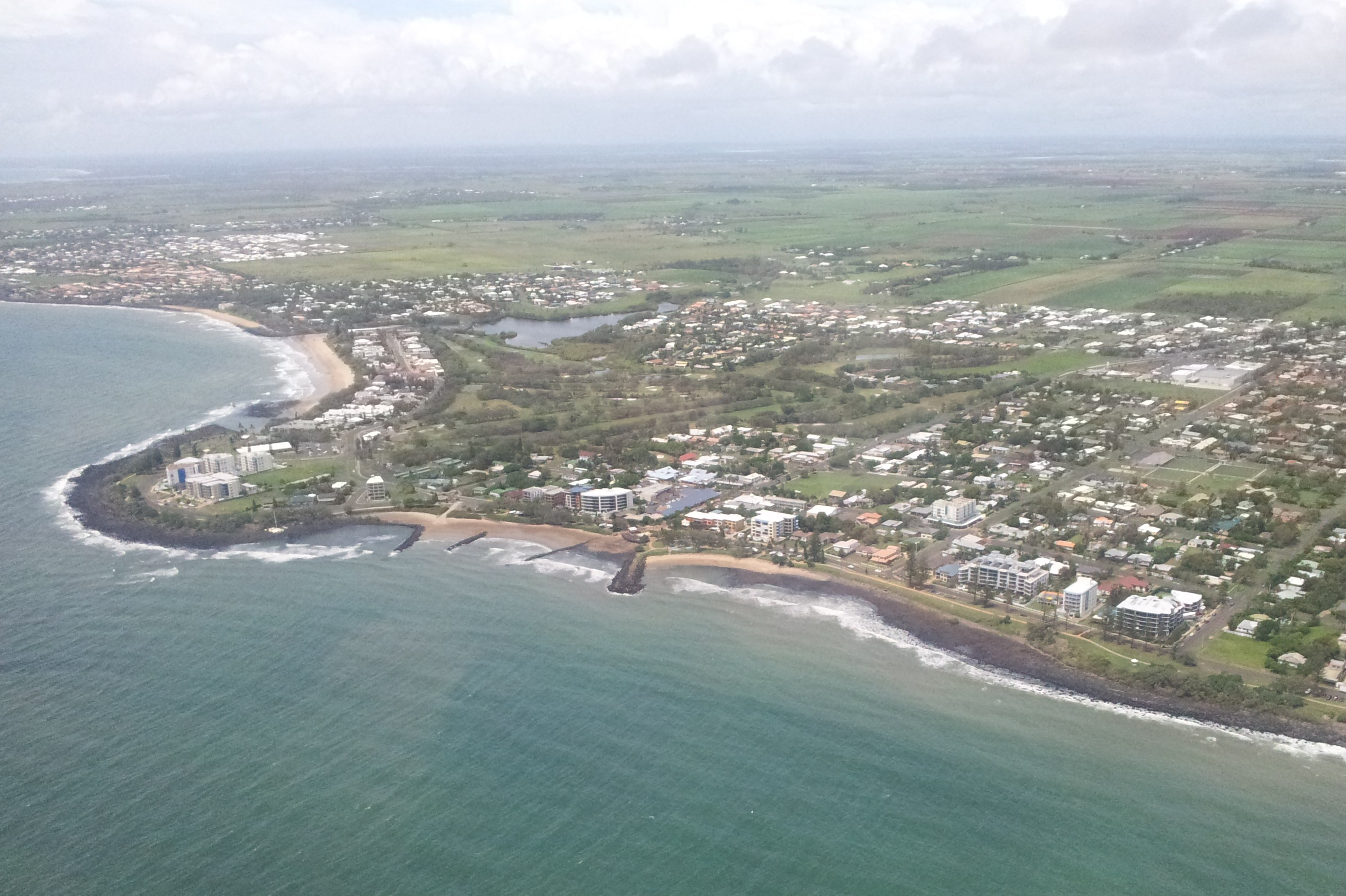

- Interactive map of Bargara
- Coordinates: 24.8205°S 152.4625°E
- Country: Australia
- State: Queensland
- LGA: Bundaberg Region
- Location: 12.3 km (7.6 mi) NE of Kepnock; 13.3 km (8.3 mi) NE of Bundaberg CBD; 371 km (231 mi) N of Brisbane

Government
  - State electorate: Burnett
  - Federal division: Hinkler

Area
  - Total: 9.3 km^{2} (3.6 sq mi)
- Elevation: 0–10 m (0–33 ft)

Population
  - Total: 8,883 (2021 census)
  - Density: 955/km^{2} (2,474/sq mi)
- Time zone: UTC+10:00 (AEST)
- Postcode: 4670
Localities around Bargara
Mon Repos	Coral Sea	Coral Sea
Qunaba	Bargara	Coral Sea
Windermere	Innes Park	Coral Sea

Bargara /bəˈɡɑːrə/ is a coastal town and suburb in the Bundaberg Region, Queensland, Australia. In the 2021 census, the suburb of Bargara had a population of 8,883 people.

The town of Bargara lies 384 kilometres (239 mi) north of the state capital Brisbane and just 13 kilometres (8 mi) east of Bundaberg. Bargara is considered to be a satellite suburb of Bundaberg, with only sugarcane fields separating the two centres.

Nielson Park is a coastal town in the north of the locality (24.8075°S 152.4566°E), only 1.5 kilometres (0.93 mi) from the town of Bargara.

== Geography ==
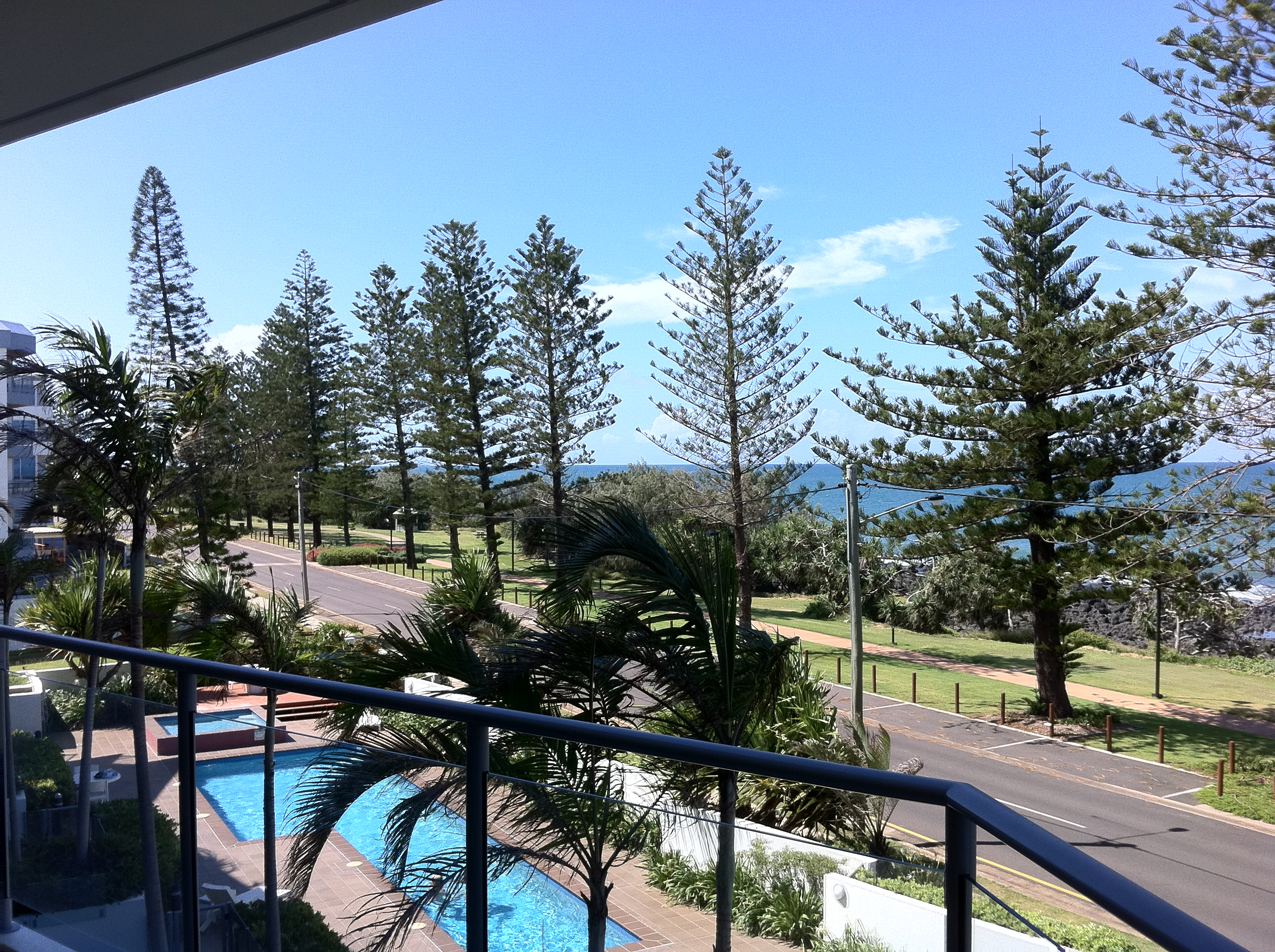
Bargara foreshore, looking through Norfolk Island pines to the Coral Sea, 2011

The main streets of Bargara are The Esplanade and Bauer Street. The Esplanade runs along the Bargara Beach foreshore, and is lined with several modern holiday homes and units. Bauer Street contains several hotels, restaurants and clothing shops. Bargara is also a popular fishing, swimming and surfing location.

The Mon Repos turtle rookery is located just north of Bargara. A wall in the reserve dating back to the very early days of settlement was constructed using Kanaka labour and rocks taken from the nearby sugarcane fields. Most of the coastline of Mon Repos is part of the Mon Repos Conservation Park, established to protect the nesting areas of sea turtles. Inland of the conversation park, much of the land is state reserves or subject to other restrictions designed to support the wildlife objectives of the conversation park.

Although officially separate towns, Nielson Park and Bargara are effectively a continuous urban area, and Nielson Park is generally regarded just as a picnic ground and beach area of Bargara.

Bargara has the following beaches:

- Bargara Beach near the town centre (24.8147°S 152.4649°E)
- Kellys Beach south of the town centre near the golf course (24.8221°S 152.4659°E)

== History ==
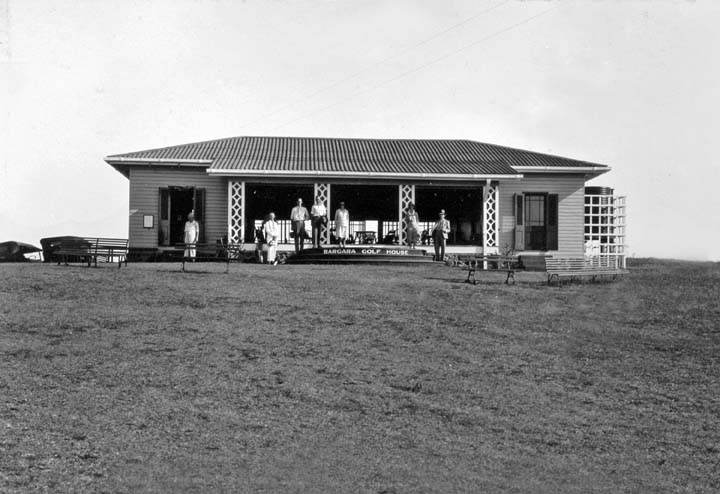
Bargara Golf Clubhouse, October 1931

The district was originally known as Sandhills, but was renamed Bargara in 1913. The name Bargara is derived from the names of two adjacent localities, Barolin and Woongarra.

Sandhills Provisional School opened in 1893 and was renamed Bargara State School in 1921.

A Primitive Methodist church was built at South Kalkie in 1878. Thirty years later, circa 1908, it was relocated to Seaview Road at Bargara.

Between 1912 and 1948, the Woongarra (Pemberton) railway line connected Bargara to Bundaberg.

In January 1922, the Methodist Church at Sandhlls was relocated to Bargara.

Bargara Post Office opened by 1923 (a receiving office had been open since 1912).

In 1924, the Bargara Golf Club was established and purchased an area of swamps and sand dunes to turn into a golf course. By 1954 the club had achieved its goal of an 18-hole course. In 1988 a new layout for the course was implemented. In 1997 a new club house was built.

In August 1945, the Anglican residents decided to erect a church. St Peter's Anglican Church was dedicated in 1951.

In February 2012, the Bargara Lions Club Park for the Disabled was renamed the Bill Fritz Park for the Disabled in honour of the late Bill Fritz, who was a long-time active member of the Lions Club and other community groups.

Bargara has grown significantly over the last decade, becoming a popular tourist and retirement destination.

On Australia Day 2013, Bargara was struck by a tornado spawned by ex-Cyclone Oswald. The tornado damaged over 150 properties, and injured up to 17 people, 2 seriously.

== Demographics ==
In the 2011 census, the suburb of Bargara had a population of 6,893 people.

In the 2016 census, the suburb of Bargara had a population of 7,485 people. Aboriginal and Torres Strait Islander people made up 2.7% of the population. 76.3% of people were born in Australia. The next most common countries of birth were England 6.4%, New Zealand 3.2% and South Africa 1.6%. 90.8% of people only spoke English at home. The most common responses for religion were No Religion 25.3%, Anglican 21.3%, Catholic 19.9% and Uniting Church 7.6%.

In the 2021 census, the suburb of Bargara had a population of 8,883 people.

== Retirement resorts ==
Bargara is serviced by two major retirement resorts that cater to a predominantly older demographic: Palm Lake Resort and Carlyle Gardens Retirement Village.

== Commerce ==
The main commercial precincts are the strips on Bauer Street between See Street and The Esplanade, and the section of See Street south of Bauer Street.

Bargara Central Shopping Centre located at the corner of Davidson Street and Bargara Road is the main large-scale shopping centre servicing the town. It has two supermarkets, Woolworths and Aldi. There are several restaurants and fast food stores.

Three other plazas lie adjacent to the Bauer Street commercial precincts, namely Coral Coast Plaza, Bargara Beach Plaza. One more small shopping complex exists at the entrance to the Carlyle Gardens Retirement Village on Woongarra Scenic Drive.

== Education ==
There are no schools in Bargara. Despite its name, Bargara State School is in the neighbouring locality of Mon Repos to the north-west. The nearest government secondary school is Kepnock State High School in Kepnock, Bundaberg, to the south-west.

== Transport ==
The town is serviced by the main roads of Bargara Road, Bauer Street, See Street, The Esplanade, Miller Street and Woongarra Scenic Drive.

Bus route no. 4 connects Bargara with the City and Sugarland Shopping Centre, running 7 days a week via Bauer Street, The Esplanade, Miller Street and Innes Park North.

== Amenities ==
There is a boat ramp at Bargara Beach off the Esplanade near Burkitt Street (24.8155°S 152.4653°E). It is managed by the Bundaberg Regional Council.

=== Churches ===
There are a number of churches in Bargara, including:

- St Peter's Anglican Church, 19-21 Bauer Street (corner of Tanner Street, 24.8163°S 152.4614°E)
- Bargara Uniting Church, 22 Blain Street (corner of Hughes Road, 24.8244°S 152.4548°E)
- St James' Catholic Church, 38 See Street (24.8119°S 152.4613°E)

=== Sports ===
Bargara Golf Club is an 18-hole golf course open to members and visitors at 120 Miller Street (24.8177°S 152.4668°E).

Other sports clubs include:

- Sandhills Sports Club
- Bundaberg Surf Lifesaving Club
- Bargara Football Club

=== Parks ===
There are a number of parks in the area:

- Bargara Esplanade Park, also known as Bargara Turtle Playground (24.8138°S 152.4638°E)
- Bargara Lakes Park (24.8393°S 152.4719°E)
- Bargara Rotary Park (24.8268°S 152.4634°E)
- Bauers Lookout (24.8332°S 152.4717°E)
- Bill Fritz Park for the Disabled (24.8155°S 152.4654°E)
- Coral Reef Park (24.8454°S 152.4775°E)
- Crawford Park (24.8277°S 152.4672°E)
- Davidson Street Park (24.8214°S 152.4554°E)
- Fairway Drive Park (24.8245°S 152.4612°E)
- Hansen-Woodhouse Park (24.8377°S 152.4746°E)
- Ian A Cossart Park (24.8281°S 152.4628°E)
- Jayteens Park (24.8041°S 152.4543°E)
- Kelly's Beach Park (24.8255°S 152.4659°E)
- Mary Kinross Park (24.8493°S 152.4763°E)
- Moneys Creek Park (24.8261°S 152.4649°E)
- New Bargara Park (24.8160°S 152.4553°E)
- Nielson Park (24.8056°S 152.4534°E)
- Nudibranch Park (24.8407°S 152.4783°E)
- Parkside Mead Park (24.8404°S 152.4687°E)
- Paul Petrie Park (24.8444°S 152.4755°E)
- Settlement Court Park (24.8467°S 152.4689°E)
- Tiny Tots Park (24.8131°S 152.4586°E)
- Tom Riley Park (24.8258°S 152.4604°E)
- Tom Whalley Park (24.8171°S 152.4493°E)
- Toysons Park (24.8134°S 152.4584°E)
- Turtle Cove Park (24.8526°S 152.4809°E)
- Windermere Park (24.8502°S 152.4716°E)

== Gallery ==
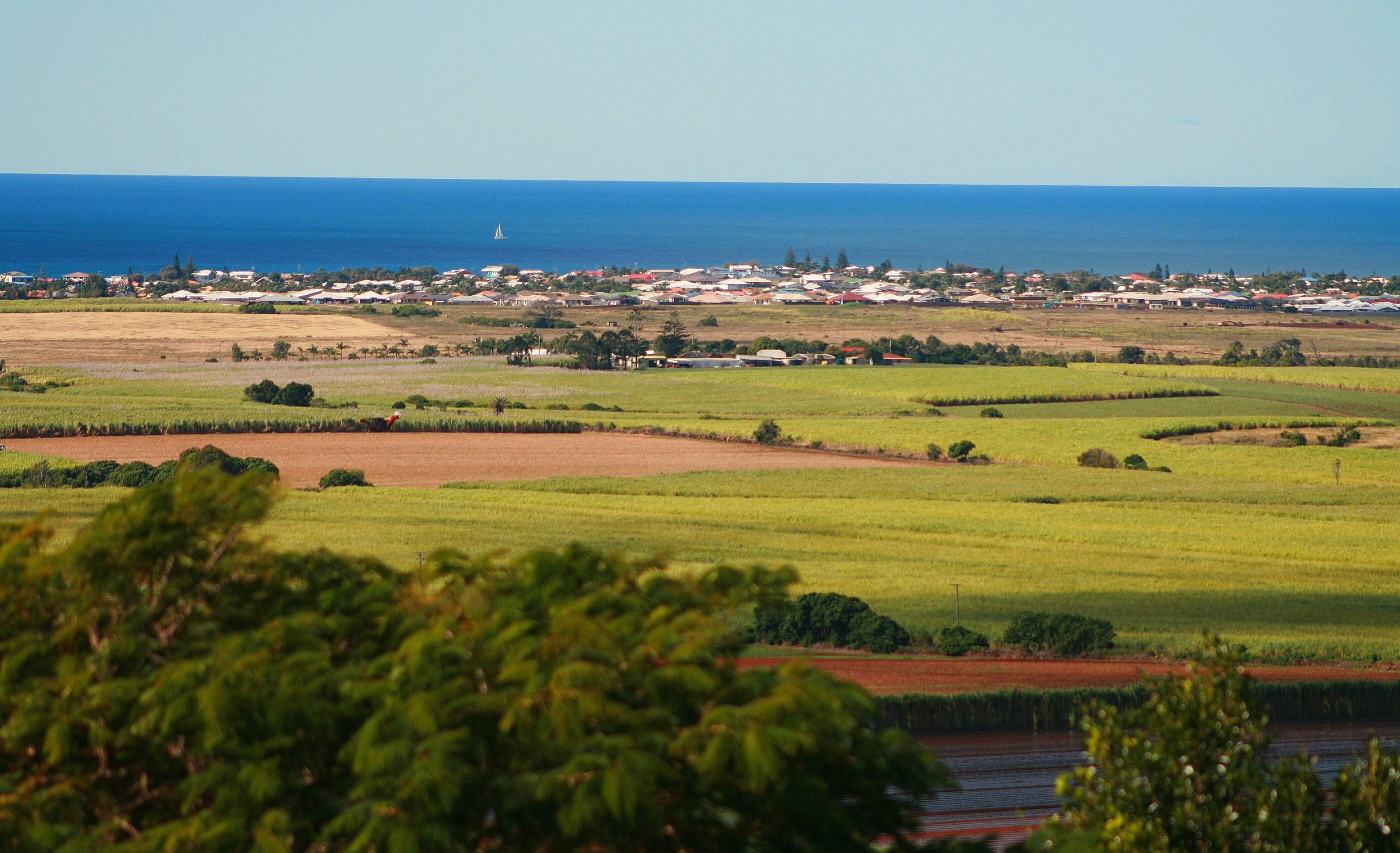
View from the Hummock

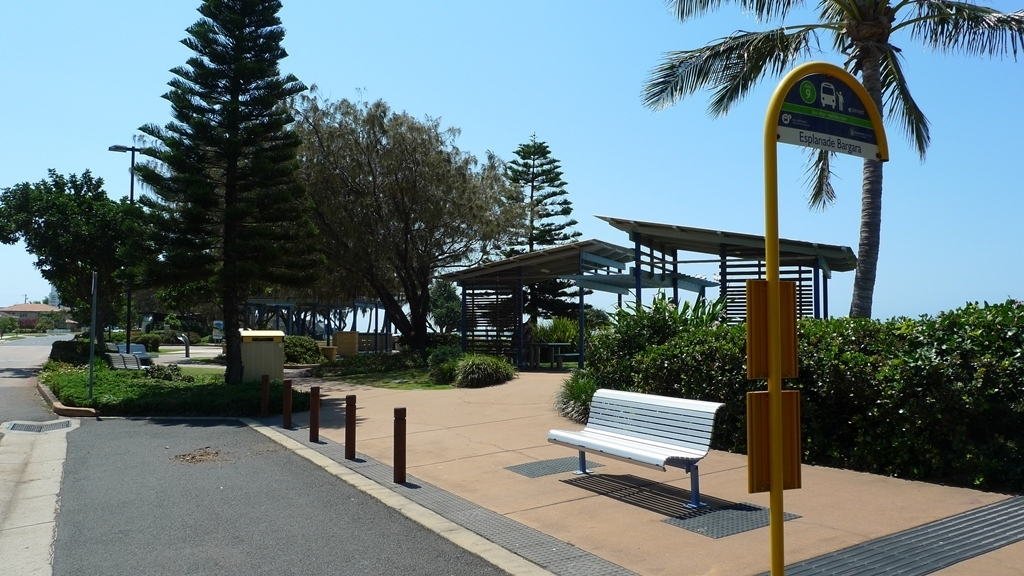
Bus stop on The Esplanade

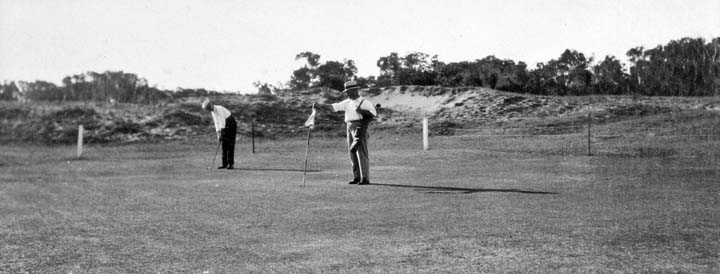
Bargara Golf Club, c. 1931

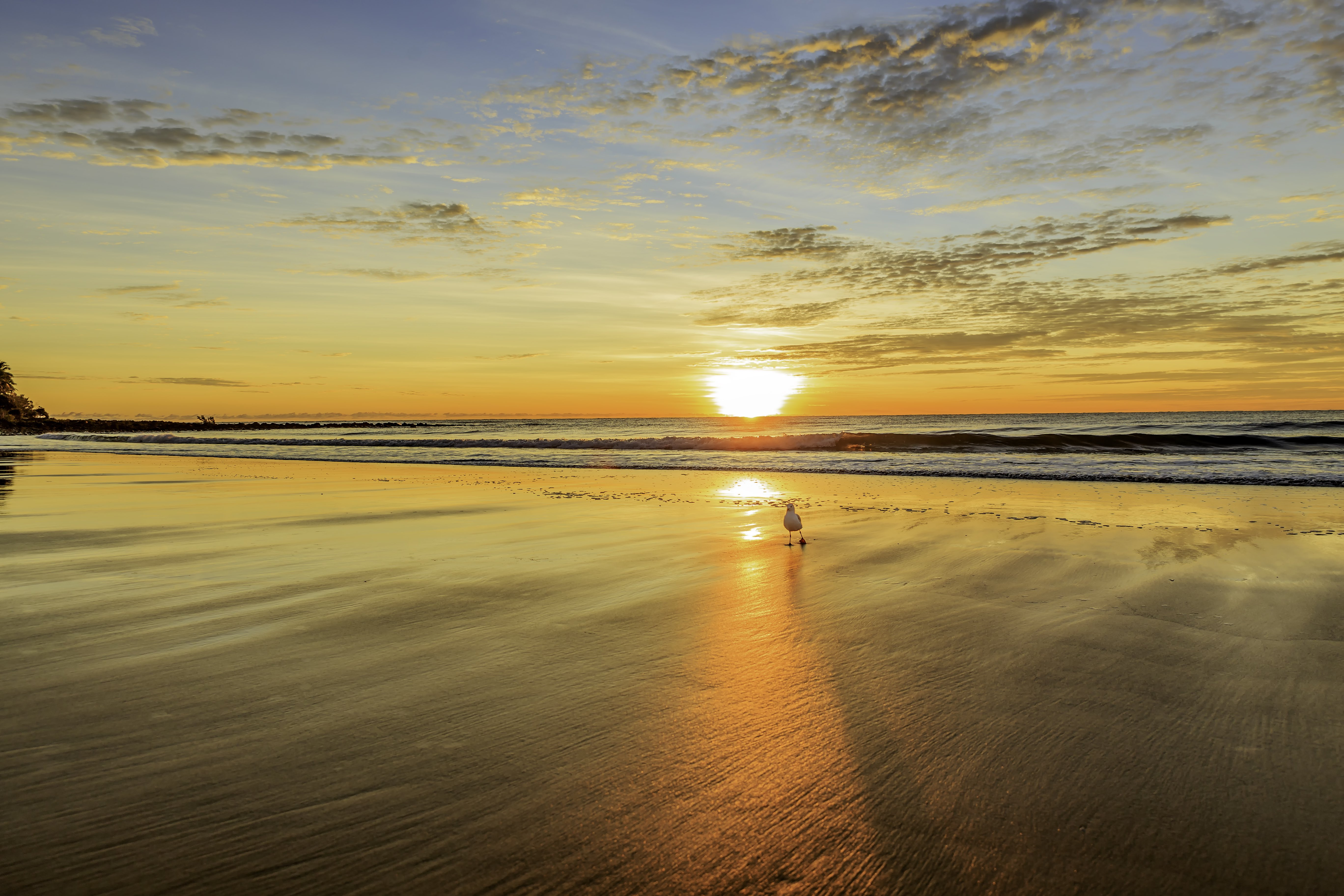
Kelly's Beach Sunrise
