= Woongarra, Queensland =

Woongarra
- Suburb
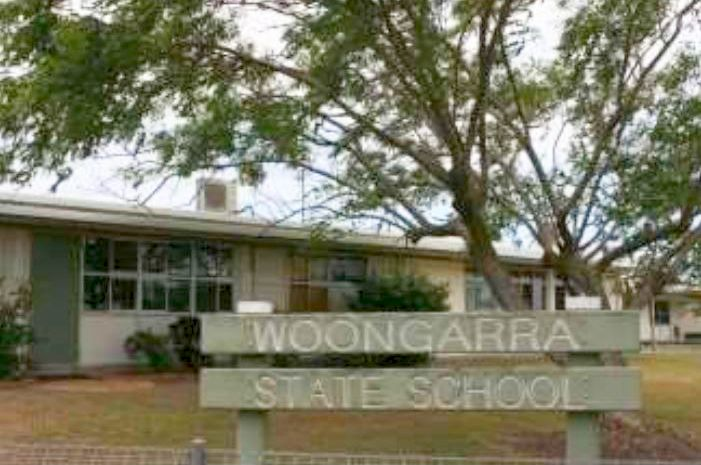
- Woongarra State School, 2015

- Interactive map of Woongarra
- Coordinates: 24.8944°S 152.4133°E
- Country: Australia
- State: Queensland
- City: Bundaberg
- LGA: Bundaberg Region
- Location: 10.7 km (6.6 mi) SE of Bundaberg; 369 km (229 mi) N of Brisbane

Government
  - State electorates: Burnett; Bundaberg
  - Federal division: Hinkler

Area
  - Total: 34.2 km^{2} (13.2 sq mi)

Population
  - Total: 585 (2021 census)
  - Density: 17.11/km^{2} (44.30/sq mi)
- Time zone: UTC+10:00 (AEST)
- Postcode: 4670
Suburbs around Woongarra
Ashfield	Windermere	Innes Park
Avenell Heights	Woongarra	Elliott Heads
Thabeban	Alloway	Calavos

Woongarra is a rural locality in the Bundaberg Region, Queensland, Australia. In the 2021 census, Woongarra had a population of 585 people.

== Geography ==
Located to the immediate south-east of the Bundaberg urban area, the locality is bounded to the north and east by Elliotts Head Road and to the south by Three Chain Road.

The terrain is relatively flat ranging from 10 to 40 metres (33 to 131 ft) above sea level. The land use is predominantly crop growing (mostly sugarcane and macadamia) and some grazing on native vegetation. There is a network of cane tramways in the locality to transport the harvested sugarcane to the local sugar mills for processing.

== History ==
The name Woongarra is an Aboriginal word meaning the brigalow tree.

In December 1878, tenders were called to erect a school and teacher's residence. When Woongarra State School opened on 13 August 1879 with 16 students, it was on the corner of Wallace's Road and Lovers Walk Road (approx 24.88679°S 152.40594°E). It moved to its present location on Elliott Heads Road in 1901.

A Primitive Methodist Church opened circa August 1878.

St John's Anglican church was dedicated on 14 October 1883. It held its last service on 29 October 1967 because of a declining population.

== Demographics ==
In the 2016 census, Woongarra had a population of 547 people.

In the 2021 census, Woongarra had a population of 585 people.

== Education ==
Woongarra State School is a government primary (Prep-6) school for boys and girls at 468 Elliott Heads Road (24.8789°S 152.4056°E). In 2017, the school had an enrolment of 459 students with 36 teachers (31 full-time equivalent) and 25 non-teaching staff (15 full-time equivalent). A special education program is available at the school.

There are no secondary schools in Woongarra. The nearest government secondary schools are Kepnock State High School in Kepnock to the north-west and Bundaberg State High School in Bundaberg South also to the north-west.
