= Port of Bundaberg =

- Interactive map of Port of Bundaberg
- Location within Australia

Location
- Country: Australia
- Location: 20 kilometres northeast of Bundaberg
- Coordinates: 24.7702°S 152.382°E
- UN/LOCODE: AUBDB

Details
- Opened: 1958
- Owned by: Gladstone Ports Corporation
- Type of Harbor: Natural
- No. of berths: 2
- No. of wharfs: two
- Draft depth: 11.0 m.
- Manager: Jason Pascoe

Statistics
- Annual cargo tonnage: 266,192 (2008-09)
- Website www.gpcl.com.au/operations/port-of-bundaberg/

Port of Bundaberg is located at Burnett Heads, 20 kilometres (12 mi) northeast of the city of Bundaberg, 5.6 nautical miles from the mouth of the Burnett River in Queensland, Australia. The port is a destination for ships from Australia and overseas. It is predominantly used for out shipping raw sugar, other goods related to that industry, such as Bundaberg Rum and molasses and importing Gypsum to supply a Knauf factory situated adjacent. Bundaberg Port is wholly owned and managed by the Gladstone Ports Corporation.

Bulk raw sugar can be stored in two large sheds, which are loaded via a travelling gantry loader. Bulk molasses is stored in three tanks and are loaded via a pipeline. Ship size is limited to 200 metres (660 ft) in length overall. There are two berths.

== History ==
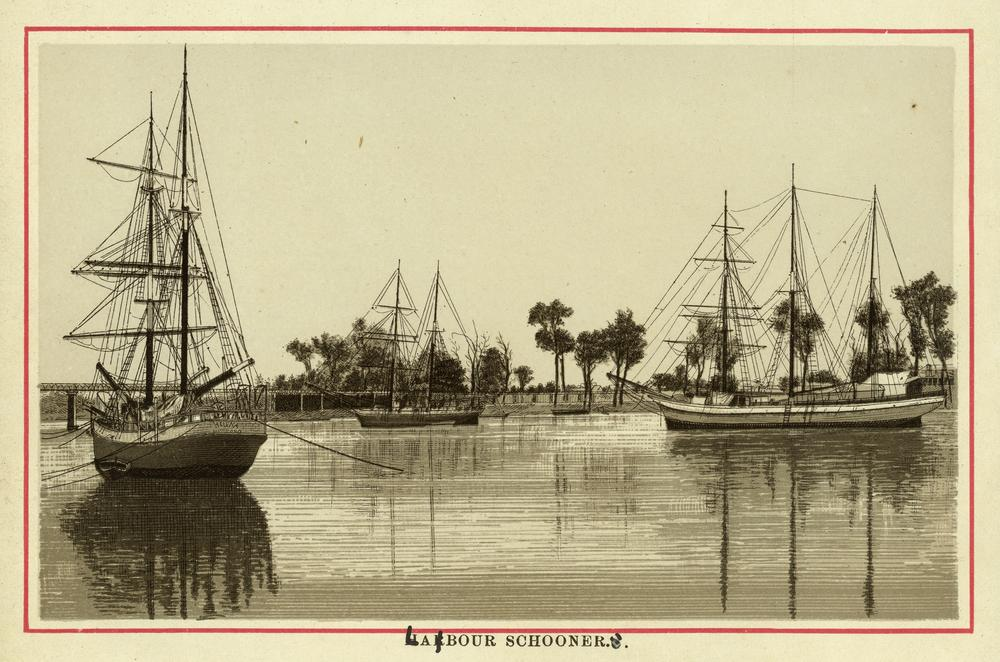
Schooners at the first upriver port, 1894

Port facilities began in the town reach of the Burnett River. This site became unsuitable for larger bulk ships. The port moved to the mouth of the river and was opened in 1958. In late December 2010, the port was closed due to the flooding of the Burnett River during the 2010–2011 Queensland floods. Emergency dredging occurred the following February to reopen the port, which was opened on 4 March 2011.

== See also ==
- List of ports in Australia
