= Kepnock, Queensland =

Kepnock
- Suburb
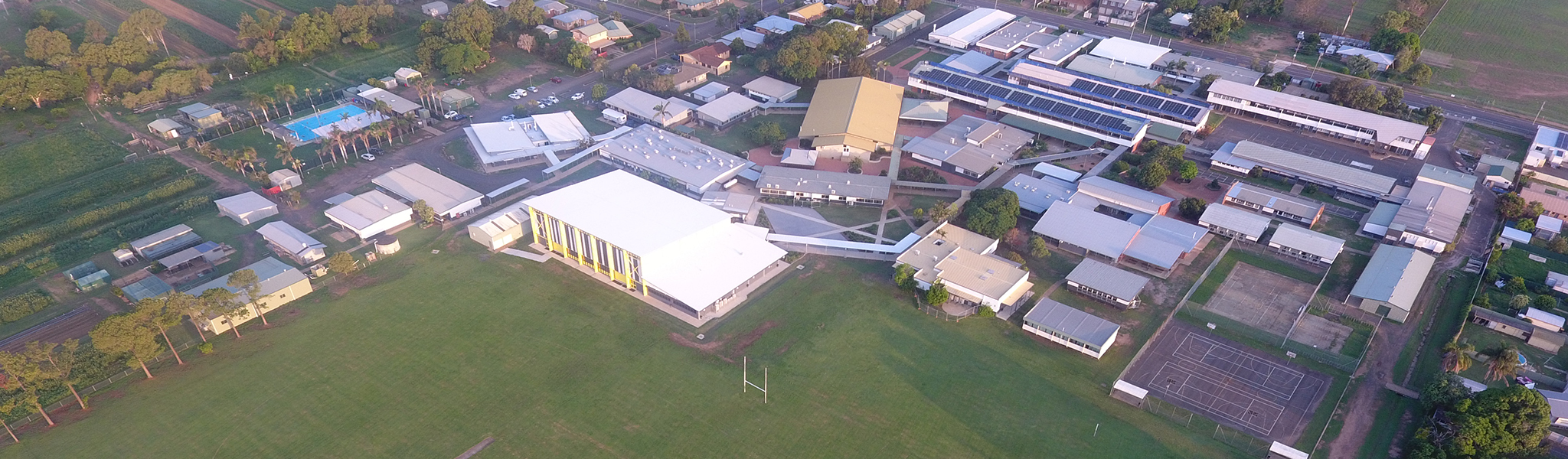
- Aerial view, Kepnock State High School, 2020

- Interactive map of Kepnock
- Coordinates: 24.8761°S 152.3761°E
- Country: Australia
- State: Queensland
- City: Bundaberg
- LGA: Bundaberg Region
- Location: 3.9 km (2.4 mi) SE of Bundaberg Central; 361 km (224 mi) N of Brisbane

Government
  - State electorate: Bundaberg
  - Federal division: Hinkler

Area
  - Total: 3.2 km^{2} (1.2 sq mi)

Population
  - Total: 4,501 (2021 census)
  - Density: 1,407/km^{2} (3,640/sq mi)
- Time zone: UTC+10:00 (AEST)
- Postcode: 4670
Suburbs around Kepnock
Bundaberg South	Bundaberg East	Bundaberg East
Bundaberg South	Kepnock	Ashfield
Walkervale	Avenell Heights	Avenell Heights

Kepnock is a suburb of Bundaberg in the Bundaberg Region, Queensland, Australia. In the 2021 census, Kepnock had a population of 4,501 people.

== Geography ==
Kepnoch is almost entirely a residential area, with small convenience stores along Bundaberg–Port Road (Elliot Heads Road).

== History ==
Kepnock State High School opened on 28 January 1964.

== Demographics ==
At the 2011 census, Kepnock had a population of 4,533 people.

In the 2016 census, Kepnock had a population of 4,441 people.

In the 2021 census, Kepnock had a population of 4,501 people.

== Education ==
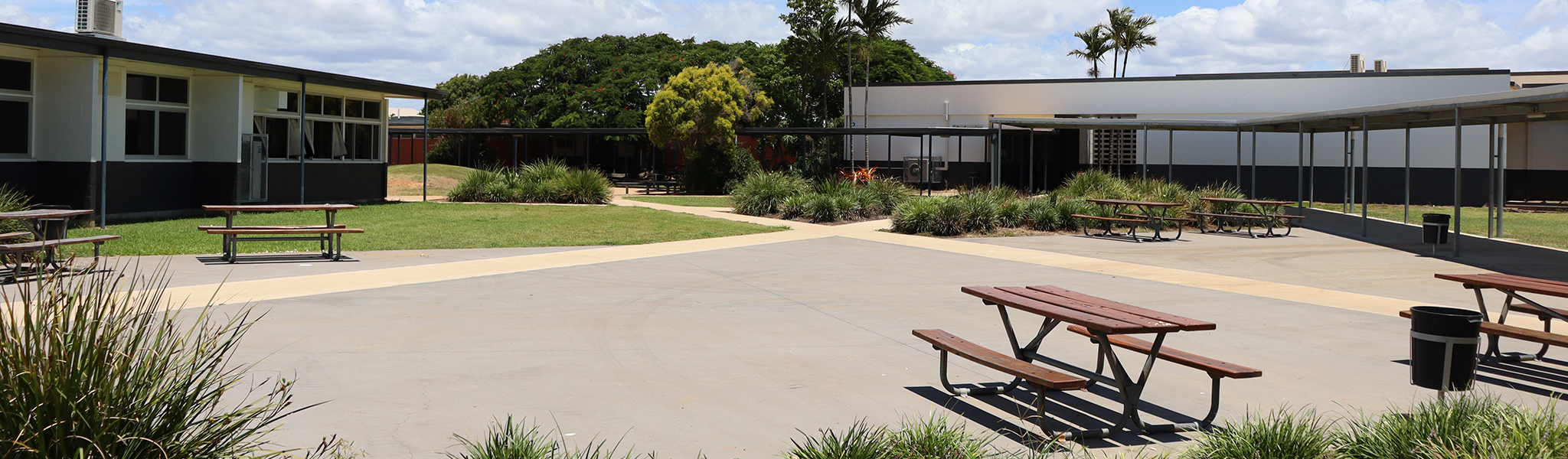
Kepnock State High School, 2019

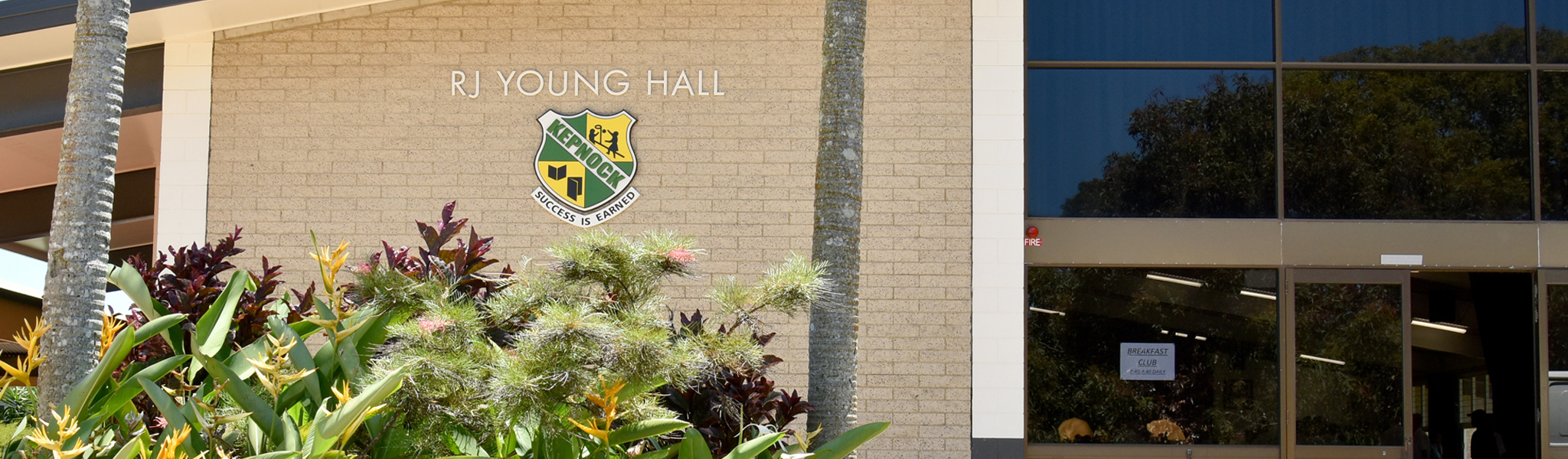
RJ Young Hall, Kepnock State High School, 2019

Kepnock State High School is a government secondary (7–12) school for boys and girls at 43 Kepnock Road (24.8762°S 152.3772°E). In 2017, the school had an enrolment of 1,365 students with 114 teachers (105 full-time equivalent) and 58 non-teaching staff (42 full-time equivalent). In 2018, the school had an enrolment of 1,354 students with 120 teachers (110 full-time equivalent) and 60 non-teaching staff (43 full-time equivalent). The school offers a special education program.

There are no primary schools in Kepnock. The nearest government primary school is Bundaberg East State School in neighbouring Bundaberg East to the north.

== Amenities ==
There are a number of parks in the suburb, including:

- CJ Neilson Park (24.8700°S 152.3749°E)
- Clive Crescent Park (24.8751°S 152.3840°E)
- FE Walker Street Park (24.8712°S 152.3795°E)
- Quinn Street Park (24.8761°S 152.3677°E)
- Scotton Street Park (24.8808°S 152.3776°E)
- Stehbens Park (24.8773°S 152.3784°E)
