= Bundaberg–Port Road =

Road in Queensland, Australia

Bundaberg–Port Road Queensland

General information
- Type: Road
- Length: 19.7 km (12 mi)

Major junctions
- Southwest end: Isis Highway, Bundaberg West
- Goodwood Road; Elliott Heads Road; Bundaberg Ring Road; Bundaberg–Bargara Road; Burnett Heads Road
- North end: Buss Street, Burnett Heads (Port of Bundaberg)

Location(s)
- Major suburbs: Walkervale, Kepnock, Ashfield, Rubyanna

Bundaberg–Port Road (known as Burnett Heads Road) is a state-controlled district road (number 175) in the Bundaberg region of Queensland, Australia. It runs from the Isis Highway in Bundaberg West to Buss Street (Port of Bundaberg) in Burnett Heads, a distance of 19.7 kilometres (12.2 mi).

== Route description ==
Bundaberg–Port Road starts at an intersection with the Isis Highway (Takalvan Street) on the Bundaberg West / Svensson Heights midpoint. It runs east between these localities as Walker Street, then turns northeast between Bundaberg South and Walkervale. Here it passes the exit to Goodwood Road (Barolin Street) to the southeast. Next it runs between Bundaberg South and Kepnock, where it passes the exit to Elliott Heads Road to the southeast. It passes through Kepnock and crosses Bundaberg Ring Road before running between Ashfield and Kalkie.

Turning north as Burnett Heads Road it runs between Qunaba and Rubyanna, crossing Bundaberg–Bargara Road. At the Qunaba / Rubyanna / Burnett Heads tripoint the road turns west as Port Road, while Burnett Heads Road continues north. Port Road runs between Burnett Heads and Rubyanna before turning north in Burnett Heads, where it ends at an intersection with Buss Street. The pyysical road continues through the port as Buss Street.

The Bundaberg Ring Road provides an alternative route from the Isis Highway to the Bundaberg–Port Road at Ashfield, thus bypassing Walker Street. Bundaberg–Port Road carries over 500,000 tonnes (490,000 long tons; 550,000 short tons) of trade goods per year.

== History ==
In 1867, timber-getters and farmers, John and Gavin Steuart, established the Woondooma property which consisted of a few houses and a wharf on the northern banks of the Burnett River where Bundaberg North now stands. An official survey of the area was undertaken in 1869 by John Charlton Thompson, and the town of Bundaberg was gazetted across the river on the higher, southern banks. Burnett Bridge, the first steel bridge across the river, was constructed in 1900.

Port facilities began in the town reach of the Burnett River. This site became unsuitable for larger bulk ships. The port moved to the mouth of the river and was opened in 1958.

== Intersecting state-controlled roads ==
This road intersects with the following state-controlled roads:

- Goodwood Road, Bundaberg
- Elliott Heads Road
- Bundaberg Ring Road
- Bundaberg–Bargara Road
- Burnett Heads Road

=== Goodwood Road, Bundaberg ===
Goodwood Road
- Location: Bundaberg–Port Road, Bundaberg South to Bruce Highway, Childers (via Goodwood)
- Length: 52 km (32 mi)

Goodwood Road is a state-controlled district road (number 171), rated as a local road of regional significance (LRRS). It runs from Bundaberg–Port Road in Bundaberg South, via Goodwood, to the Bruce Highway in Childers, a distance of 52 kilometres (32 mi). It intersects with the Bundaberg Ring Road in Thabeban.

=== Elliott Heads Road ===
Elliott Heads Road
- Location: Bundaberg–Port Road, Bundaberg South to Lihs Street, Elliott Heads
- Length: 17.3 km (10.7 mi)

Elliott Heads Road is a state-controlled district road (number 172), rated as a local road of regional significance (LRRS). It runs from Bundaberg–Port Road in Bundaberg South to Lihs Street in Elliott Heads, a distance of 17.3 kilometres (10.7 mi). It intersects with the Bundaberg Ring Road in Ashfield, Bundaberg–Bargara Road in Rubyanna, and Innes Park Road (see below) in Innes Park.

=== Burnett Heads Road ===
Burnett Heads Road
- Location: Bundaberg–Port Road, Burnett Heads to Zunker Street, Burnett Heads
- Length: 3.5 km (2.2 mi)

Burnett Heads Road is a state-controlled district road (number 1751), rated as a local road of regional significance (LRRS). It runs from Bundaberg–Port Road in Burnett Heads to Zunker Street in Burnett Heads, a distance of 3.5 kilometres (2.2 mi). This road has no major intersections.

== Associated state-controlled road ==
Innes Park Road intersects with Elliott Heads Road:

=== Innes Park Road ===
Innes Park Road
- Location: Elliott Heads Road, Innes Park to Back Windemere Road, Innes Park
- Length: 1.7 km (1.1 mi)

Innes Park Road is a state-controlled district road (number 1720), rated as a local road of regional significance (LRRS). It runs from Elliott Heads Road in Innes Park to Back Windemere Road in Innes Park, a distance of 1.7 kilometres (1.1 mi). This road has no major intersections.

== Major intersections ==
All distances are from Google Maps. The entire road is within the Bundaberg local government area.

Location	km	mi	Destinations	Notes
Bundaberg West / Svensson Heights midpoint	0	0.0	Isis Highway (Takalvan Street) – southwest – Apple Tree Creek, Bruce Highway – northeast – Bundaberg Central, Bundaberg North	Southwestern end of Bundaberg–Port Road. Road runs east as Walker Street.
Bundaberg South / Walkervale midpoint	2.4	1.5	Goodwood Road (Barolin Street) – northwest/southeast – Bundaberg Central / Goodwood	Road continues northeast as Walker Street.
Bundaberg South / Walkervale / Kepnock midpoint	3.4	2.1	Boundary Street – north/south – Bundaberg South / Walkervale	Road continues northeast as Fe Walker Street.
Bundaberg South / Kepnock midpoint	3.7	2.3	Elliott Heads Road – southeast – Elliott Heads	Road continues northeast.
Ashfield / Bundaberg East midpoint	6.0	3.7	Bundaberg Ring Road – south – Ashfield, Isis Highway – north – Bundaberg East	Road continues northeast.
Kalkie / Windermere / Ashfield tripoint	8.0	5.0	Ashfield Road – northwest/southeast – Kalkie / Ashfield	Road continues northeast as Burnett Heads Road.
Qunaba / Rubyanna midpoint	9.9	6.2	Bundaberg–Bargara Road – northeast/southwest – Bargara / Bundaberg Central	Road continues north.
Qunaba / Rubyanna / Burnett Heads tripoint	15.2	9.4	Burnett Heads Road – northwest – Burnett Heads	Road turns west and name changes to Port Road.
Burnett Heads	19.7	12.2	Buss Street – northeast – Port of Bundaberg	Northern end of Bundaberg–Port Road.
1.000 mi = 1.609 km; 1.000 km = 0.621 mi: Route transition

== See also ==
- List of numbered roads in Queensland
