= Svensson Heights, Queensland =

Svensson Heights
- Suburb
- Interactive map of Svensson Heights
- Coordinates: 24.8844°S 152.3330°E
- Country: Australia
- State: Queensland
- City: Bundaberg
- LGA: Bundaberg Region
- Location: 3.1 km (1.9 mi) SE of Bundaberg CBD; 110 km (68 mi) NW of Hervey Bay; 358 km (222 mi) N of Brisbane

Government
  - State electorate: Bundaberg
  - Federal division: Hinkler

Area
  - Total: 2.9 km^{2} (1.1 sq mi)

Population
  - Total: 3,334 (2021 census)
  - Density: 1,150/km^{2} (2,980/sq mi)
- Time zone: UTC+10:00 (AEST)
- Postcode: 4670
Suburbs around Svensson Heights
Millbank	Bundaberg West	Bundaberg West
Kensington	Svensson Heights	Norville
Kensington	Norville	Norville

Svensson Heights is a suburb in the Bundaberg Region, Queensland, Australia. In the 2021 census, Svensson Heights had a population of 3,334 people.

== Geography ==
The suburb is bounded by Takalvan Street to the west and Walker Street to the north.

The land use is residential in the north of the suburb and industrial in the south.

== Demographics ==
In the 2016 census, Svensson Heights had a population of 3,203 people.

In the 2021 census, Svensson Heights had a population of 3,334 people.

== Education ==
There are no schools in Svensson Heights. The nearest government primary schools are Norville State School in neighbouring Norville to the south-east, Bundaberg West State School in neighbouring Bundaberg West to the north, and Bundaberg Central State School in Bundaberg Central to the north-east. The nearest government secondary school is Bundaberg State High School in Bundaberg South to the north-east.

There are also a number of non-government schools in Bundaberg's suburbs.
