= Bundaberg–Bargara Road =

Road in Queensland, Australia

Bundaberg–Bargara Road Queensland

General information
- Type: Road
- Length: 14.4 km (8.9 mi)

Major junctions
- West end: Isis Highway, Bundaberg West
- Bundaberg–Gin Gin Road; Bundaberg Ring Road; Bundaberg–Port Road
- East end: Holland Street, Bargara

Location(s)
- Major suburbs: Bundaberg East, Kalkie, Qunaba

Bundaberg–Bargara Road is a state-controlled district road (number 174) in the Bundaberg region of Queensland, Australia. It is rated as a local road of regional significance (LRRS). It runs from the Isis Highway in Bundaberg West to Holland Street in Bargara, a distance of 14.4 kilometres (8.9 mi).

== Route description ==
Bundaberg–Bargara Road starts at an intersection with the Isis Highway (Takalvan Street and Mulgrave Street) in Bundaberg West. It runs northeast as Bourbong Street until it reaches Maryborough Street in Bundaberg Central. Here it diverts from Bourbong Street by following Maryborough Street to the northwest, Quay Street to the northeast, and Toonburra Street to the southeast. It passes the exit to Bundaberg–Gin Gin Road (Burnett Bridge) to the northwest as it enters Quay Street.

Returning to Bourbong Street the road runs northeast into Bundaberg East, where it turns east on Scotland Street and then northeast on Princess Street, which soon becomes Bargara Road. It passes the exit to Bundaberg Ring Road to the southeast as it enters Kalkie. Continuing northeast across Kalkie and the southern tip of Rubyanna the road crosses Bundaberg–Port Road (known as Burnett Heads Road) as it enters Qunaba. After crossing Qunaba it enters Bargara, where it ends at an intersection with Holland Street. The physical road continues to the Esplanade as Bauer Street.

This road supports a substantial tourism industry in addition to the resident population and business community.

== Upgrade projects ==
A project to upgrade targeted sections of Bundaberg–Bargara Road, at an estimated cost of $10 million, was in the planning stage in early 2023.

A project to upgrade Quay Street, Bundaberg Central, at an estimated cost of $32 million, was in the planning stage in late 2019. The Bundaberg Regional Council has completed a preliminary business case for the "demaining" of Quay Street, at a total estimated cost of $66 million.

NOTE: Demaining means transferring control of the street from state to council.

== History ==
In 1867, timber-getters and farmers, John and Gavin Steuart, established the Woondooma property which consisted of a few houses and a wharf on the northern banks of the Burnett River where Bundaberg North now stands. An official survey of the area was undertaken in 1869 by John Charlton Thompson, and the town of Bundaberg was gazetted across the river on the higher, southern banks. Burnett Bridge, the first steel bridge across the river, was constructed in 1900.

Bargara, then known as Sandhills, was developed for holiday homes from the late 1880s. Between 1912 and 1948, the Woongarra (Pemberton) railway line connected Bargara to Bundaberg.

== Intersecting state-controlled roads ==
This road intersects with the following state-controlled roads:

- Bundaberg–Gin Gin Road
- Bundaberg Ring Road
- Bundaberg–Port Road

=== Bundaberg Ring Road ===
Bundaberg Ring Road
- Location: Isis Highway, Kensington to Bundaberg–Bargara Road, Kalkie
- Length: 14.3 km (8.9 mi)

Bundaberg Ring Road is a state-controlled regional road (number 177). It runs from the Isis Highway in Kensington to Bundaberg–Bargara Road in Kalkie, a distance of 14.3 kilometres (8.9 mi). It intersects with Goodwood Road in Thabeban, Elliott Heads Road in Ashfield, and Bundaberg–Port Road in Bundaberg East.

The Bundaberg Ring Road provides an alternative route from the Isis Highway to the Bundaberg–Port Road at Ashfield, thus bypassing Walker Street. It also provides an alternative route from the Isis Highway to the Bundaberg–Bargara Road at Kalkie, thus bypassing the Bundaberg CBD.

== Major intersections ==
All distances are from Google Maps. The entire road is within the Bundaberg local government area.

Location	km	mi	Destinations	Notes
Bundaberg West	0	0.0	Isis Highway (Takalvan Street) – southwest – Apple Tree Creek, Bruce Highway (Mulgrave Street) – northeast by north – Bundaberg North	Western end of Bundaberg–Bargara Road. Road runs northeast by east as Bourbong Street.
Bundaberg Central	0.9	0.56	Maryborough Street – north/south – Bundaberg Central; Bourbong Street – east – Bundaberg East	Road turns north as Maryborough Street.
Bundaberg Central	1.0	0.62	Quay Street – east/west – Bundaberg Central	Road turns east as Quay Street.
Bundaberg Central	1.1	0.68	Bundaberg–Gin Gin Road (Burnett Bridge) – north – Bundaberg North	Road continues east as Quay Street
Bundaberg Central	2.1	1.3	Toonburra Street – south – Bundaberg Central	Road turns south as Toonburra Street
Bundaberg Central	2.2	1.4	Bourbong Street – west – Bundaberg Central – east – Bundaberg East	Road turns east as Bourbong Street
Bundaberg East	3.1	1.9	Scotland Street – east/west – Bundaberg East	Road continues east as Scotland Street
Bundaberg East	3.3	2.1	Princess Street – southwest – Bundaberg South – northeast – Kalkie	Road continues northeast as Princess Street, which soon becomes Bargara Road
Bundaberg East / Kalkie midpoint	5.4	3.4	Bundaberg Ring Road – southeast – Ashfield	Road continues northeast as Bargara Road
Kalkie / Qunaba midpoint	8.2	5.1	Bundaberg–Port Road (Elliott Heads Road) – north – Elliott Heads, Port of Bundaberg – south – Ashfield	Road continues northeast as Bargara Road
Bargara	14.4	8.9	Holland Street – northwest / southeast – Bargara	Eastern end of Bundaberg–Bargara Road. Physical road continues northeast to the Esplanade as Bauer Street.
1.000 mi = 1.609 km; 1.000 km = 0.621 mi: Route transition

== See also ==
- List of numbered roads in Queensland
