= Thabeban railway station =

Former railway station in Queensland, Australia

Thabeban

General information
- Location: Thabeban Road, Avenell Heights, Queensland
- Coordinates: 24°53′38.4″S 152°21′10″E
- Line: North Coast Line
- Connections: no connections

History
- Closed: Yes

Services
Preceding station	Queensland Rail	Following station
Clayton towards Brisbane	North Coast line	Bundaberg towards Cairns
Location

Thabeban Railway Station is a closed railway station on the North Coast railway line in Queensland. It is located on the outskirts of Bundaberg on the boundary of the suburbs of Norville and Avenell Heights (and not in the suburb of Thabeban as the name might suggest).

== History ==
In 1873 it was decided to build a racecourse for Bundaberg so a site was reserved well outside the town with construction commencing in June 1873. When the North Coast railway line reached Bundaberg in 1889, the racecourse was modified so that the grandstand opened directly onto the Racecourse railway station. In 1893, the name of the station was changed to Thabeban railway station, which has been suggested was an Aboriginal name meaning sports ground.
