= Kensington, Queensland =

Kensington Bundaberg, Queensland
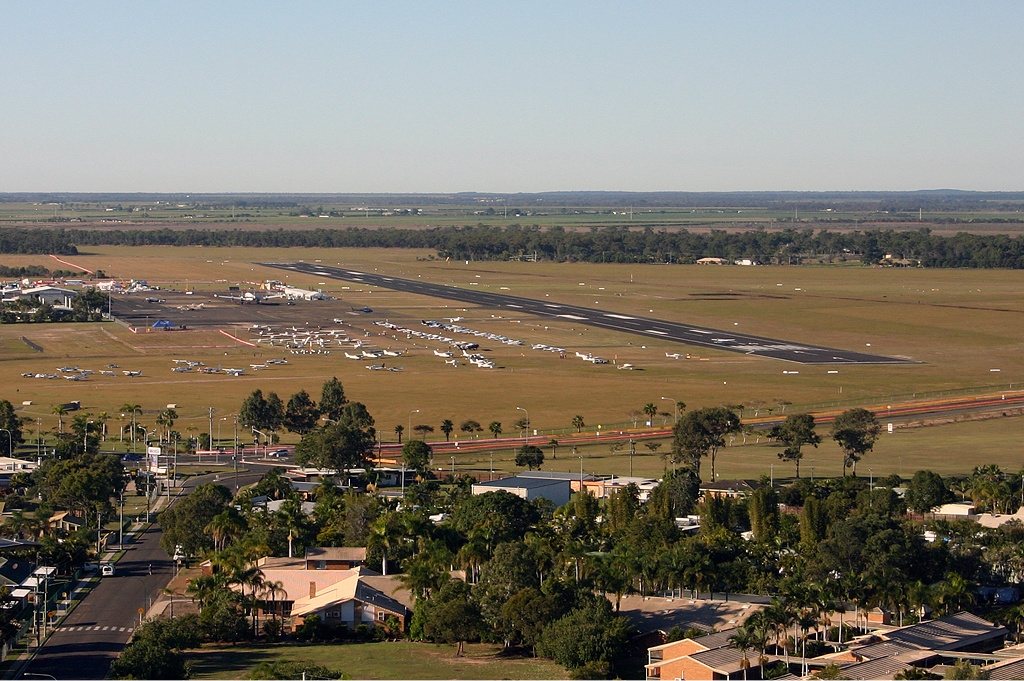
- Bundaberg Airport, 2005

- Coordinates: 24.915°S 152.3205°E
- Population: 722 (2021 census)
  - Density: 46.28/km^{2} (119.9/sq mi)
- Postcode(s): 4670
- Area: 15.6 km^{2} (6.0 sq mi)
- Time zone: AEST (UTC+10:00)
- Location: 10.1 km (6 mi) SW of Bundaberg CBD; 356 km (221 mi) N of Brisbane
- LGA(s): Bundaberg Region
- State electorate(s): Burnett; Bundaberg
- Federal division(s): Hinkler
Suburbs around Kensington:
Avoca	Millbank	Svensson Heights; Norville
Branyan	Kensington	Thabeban
Branyan	Elliott	Alloway

Kensington is a mixed-use locality in the Bundaberg Region, Queensland, Australia. Traditionally a rural area on the south-western outskirts of Bundaberg, there is increasing commercial and residential development within the locality. In the 2021 census, Kensington had a population of 722 people.

== Geography ==
The locality is bounded to the south-west and west by Childers Road and to the north-west by Takalvan Road. The Bundaberg Ring Road enters the locality in the south-west from Childers Road and exits to the east (Thabeban).

Bundaberg Airport is in the north-west of the locality on Airport Drive (24.9019°S 152.3198°E), while the north-east of the locality is predominantly commercial developments.

There are areas of rural residential housing in the west and south-west of the locality, while most of the south of the locality is used for growing sugarcane.

== History ==
Bundaberg Aerodrome (now the Bundaberg Airport) was officially opened by Frank Forde on Saturday 12 December 1931. 3000 people attended and were entertained with an aerial pageant with seven aeroplanes competing. During World War II, it was one of 36 air bases in Australia that hosted the Empire Air Training Scheme. From 1942, the Allied Works Council constructed a number of buildings at the airport, some of which still exist and are listed on the Bundaberg Regional Local Heritage Register.

The athletics track at Bundaberg Super Park opened in 2014.

== Demographics ==
In the 2016 census, Kensington had a population of 569 people.

In the 2021 census, Kensington had a population of 722 people.

== Education ==
There are no schools in Kensington. The nearest government primary schools are:

- Avoca State School in neighbouring Avoca to the north-west
- Norville State School in Norville to the north-east
- Thabeban State School in neighbouring Thabeban to the east
- Branyan Road State School in neighbouring Branyan to the west

The nearest government secondary school is Bundaberg State High School in Bundaberg South to the north-east.

There are also a number of non-government schools within Bundaberg and its suburbs.

== Amenities ==
Bundaberg Super Park has an athletic facility with a full synthetic athletic surface and has World Athletics Class Two Certification. It also has a netball facility with 12 synthetic courts. It is at 40 Enid Ethel Drive (24.9028°S 152.3280°E) and is operated by the Bundaberg Regional Council.

There are a number of parks in the area:

- Commercial Street Park (24.8946°S 152.3274°E)
- Enid Lane Park (24.8887°S 152.3237°E)

== Facilities ==
Bundaberg Private Day Hospital is at 51 Commercial Street (24.8970°S 152.3269°E).
