= Avoca, Queensland =

Avoca
- Suburb
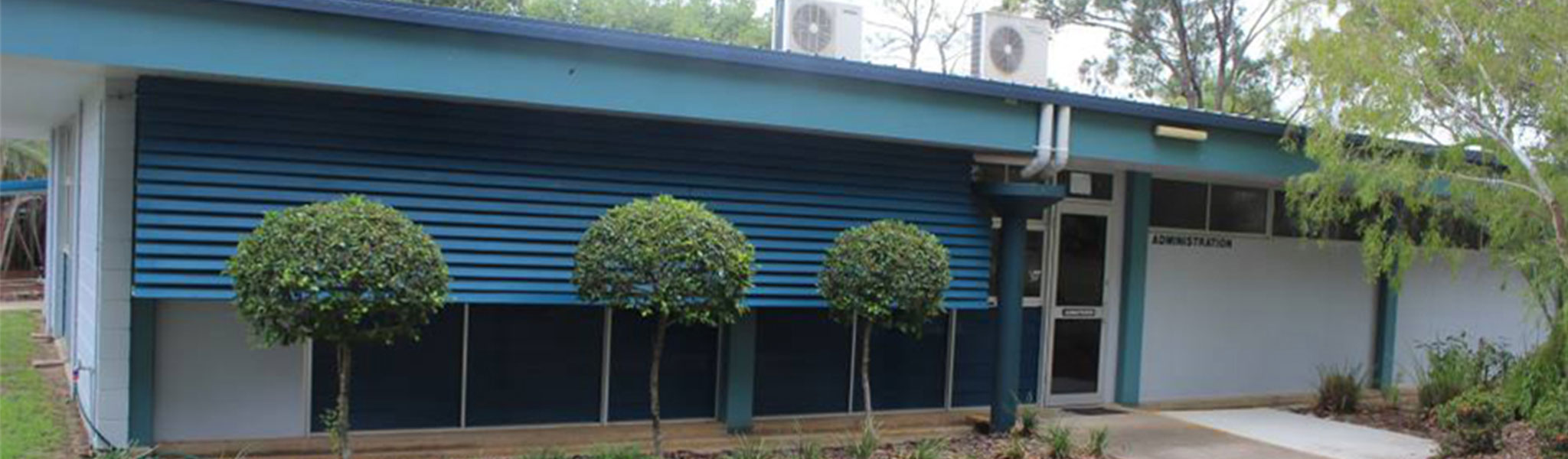
- Avoca State School, 2024

- Interactive map of Avoca
- Coordinates: 24.8830°S 152.3080°E
- Country: Australia
- State: Queensland
- City: Bundaberg
- LGA: Bundaberg Region
- Location: 4.3 km (2.7 mi) W of Bundaberg Central; 366 km (227 mi) N of Brisbane

Government
  - State electorate: Bundaberg
  - Federal division: Hinkler

Area
  - Total: 5.8 km^{2} (2.2 sq mi)

Population
  - Total: 4,912 (2021 census)
  - Density: 847/km^{2} (2,193/sq mi)
- Time zone: UTC+10:00 (AEST)
- Postcode: 4670
Suburbs around Avoca
| Sharon | Oakwood | Millbank |
| Sharon | Avoca | Millbank |
| Branyan | Branyan | Kensington |

Avoca is a south-western suburb of Bundaberg in the Bundaberg Region, Queensland, Australia. In the 2021 census, Avoca had a population of 4,912 people.

== Geography ==
Avoca is bordered by the Burnett River to the north and west, and the suburb of Millbank and Isis Highway to the east.

Tomato Island 85.8-hectare (212-acre) island in the river which is within the suburb of Avoca (24.8753°S 152.2975°E). Boral operate a quarry there.

The land use in the suburb is mostly residential, with some crop growing and grazing on native vegetation near the river.

== History ==
Sugarland Plaza shopping centre opened in 1978.

Avoca State School opened on 29 January 1980.

== Demographics ==
In the 2011 census, Avoca had a population of 5,045.

In the 2016 census, Avoca had a population of 4,904 people.

In the 2021 census, Avoca had a population of 4,912 people.

== Education ==
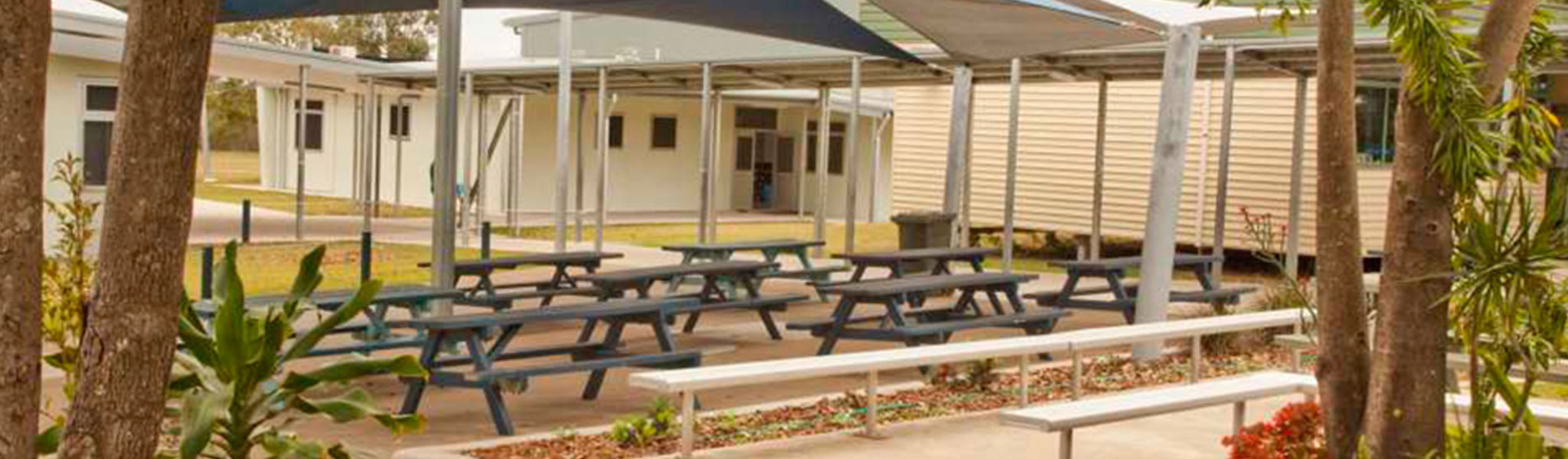
Outdoor area, Avoca State School, 2024

Avoca State School is a government primary (Prep-6) school for boys and girls at 1 Twyford Street (24.8836°S 152.3134°E). In 2017, the school had an enrolment of 363 students with 33 teachers (26 full-time equivalent) and 16 non-teaching staff (11 full-time equivalent). It includes a special education program.

There are no secondary schools in Avoca. The nearest government secondary school is Bundaberg State High School in Bundaberg South to the east.

== Amenities ==
Sugarland Plaza Bundaberg is a shopping centre at 115 Takalvan Street (24.8872°S 152.3184°E). It is anchored by Woolworths, Big W, Best & Less and has over 65 speciality stores.
