= Bundaberg South State School =

Bundaberg South State School may refer to:

- the present-day Bundaberg South State School in Bundaberg South
- the former Bundaberg South State School, now the Bundaberg Central State School
