= Country Comfort =

Country Comfort may refer to:

- Country Comfort (TV series), an American comedy series released by Netflix on March 19, 2021
- Country Comfort KWVT-LD music video show
- Country Comfort Motel Millbank, Queensland
- "Country Comfort", song by Elton John from Tumbleweed Connection
- Country Comfort, band led by Billy Kaui and members of Kalapana (band)
