= Millbank, Queensland =

Millbank
- Suburb
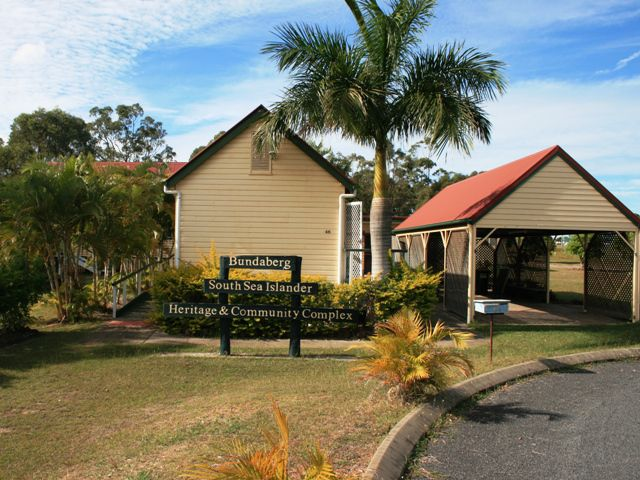
- South Sea Islander Church and Hall, 2009

- Interactive map of Millbank
- Coordinates: 24.8747°S 152.3219°E
- Country: Australia
- State: Queensland
- City: Bundaberg
- LGA: Bundaberg Region
- Location: 3.6 km (2.2 mi) W of Bundaberg Central; 362 km (225 mi) N of Brisbane

Government
  - State electorate: Bundaberg
  - Federal division: Hinkler

Area
  - Total: 3.4 km^{2} (1.3 sq mi)

Population
  - Total: 2,499 (2021 census)
  - Density: 735/km^{2} (1,904/sq mi)
- Time zone: UTC+10:00 (AEST)
- Postcode: 4670
Suburbs around Millbank
Oakwood	Bundaberg North	Bundaberg East
Avoca	Millbank	Bundaberg West
Avoca	Kensington	Avenell Heights

Millbank is a mixed-use suburb in the Bundaberg Region, Queensland, Australia. In the 2021 census, Millbank had a population of 2,499 people.

== Geography ==
The suburb is bounded to the north by the Burnett River.

The Bundaberg General Cemetery occupies the southern corner of the suburb extending west into Avoca. The northern part of the suburb is used for agriculture, a mix of growing sugarcane and grazing on native vegetation. The rest of the suburb is used for residential purposes.

== History ==
In 1869 a cemetery was established a block bounded by Woongarra, Maryborough, Woondooma and McLean Streets (in present-day Bundaberg Central). It was quickly recognised this could not be a long-term option and a new site of 40 acres (16 ha) was reserved for a new cemetery (now within Millbank) and burials commenced there in 1873. In 1881 the deteriorating condition of the old cemetery led to calls to exhume and relocate the burials from the old cemetery to the new, with the rationale that the proceeds of selling the land of the old cemetery would outweigh the cost of relocating the graves. The relocation of the graves was completed by January 1882.

== Demographics ==
In the 2011 census, Millbank had a population of 2,601 people.

In the 2016 census, Millbank had a population of 2,512 people.

In the 2021 census, Millbank had a population of 2,499 people.

== Heritage listings ==
Millbank has a number of heritage-listed sites, including:

- 46 Johnston Street (24.8812°S 152.3216°E): South Sea Islander Church

== Education ==
There are no schools in Millbank. The nearest government primary schools are Avoca State School in neighbouring Avoca to the west and Bundaberg West State School in neighbouring Bundaberg West to the east. The nearest government secondary school is Bundaberg State High School in Bundaberg South to the east.

== Facilities ==
Bundaberg General and Lawn Cemetery is a block bounded by Takalvan Street, Hampson Street, Johnson Street and Bolewski Streets (24.8831°S 152.3223°E).

Millbank Wastewater Treatment Plant is a sewage treatment plant at Duffy Street (24.8660°S 152.3176°E). It discharges the treated water into the adjacent Burnett River.

== Amenities ==
Millbank has quite a range of small restaurants and businesses, as well as some larger franchises. Smaller businesses are generally located in the centre of the suburb and include a fish and chip shop and Thai restaurant. Larger services are located along Takalvan Street.

There are a number of parks in the locality, including:

- Alexandra Park (24.8678°S 152.3318°E)
- Avoca Street Park (24.8775°S 152.3166°E)
- Jubilee Park (24.8763°S 152.3264°E)
- Letinic Street Park (24.8749°S 152.3137°E)
