= Avenell Heights, Queensland =

Avenell Heights Bundaberg, Queensland
- Coordinates: 24.8886°S 152.3691°E
- Population: 5,028 (2021 census)
  - Density: 1,676/km^{2} (4,340/sq mi)
- Postcode(s): 4670
- Area: 3.0 km^{2} (1.2 sq mi)
- Time zone: AEST (UTC+10:00)
- Location: 3.1 km (2 mi) S of Bundaberg Central; 369 km (229 mi) N of Brisbane
- LGA(s): Bundaberg Region
- State electorate(s): Bundaberg
- Federal division(s): Hinkler
Suburbs around Avenell Heights:
Walkervale	Walkervale	Kepnock
Norville	Avenell Heights	Ashfield
Thabeban	Thabeban	Woongarra

Avenell Heights is a southern suburb of Bundaberg in the Bundaberg Region, Queensland, Australia. In the 2021 census, Avenell Heights had a population of 5,028 people.

== Geography ==
The North Coast railway line forms the western boundary of the suburb.

The suburb is flat land used almost entirely for residential purposes with the exception of the Bundaberg Racecourse at 28 Maynard Street on a 36.01-hectare (89.0-acre) site in the north-west of the suburb (24.8878°S 152.3537°E).

== History ==
The suburb was officially named by Queensland Place Names Board on 1 January 1967. It was officially bounded on 16 June 2000.

The now-abandoned Thabeban railway station once served the suburb. It was adjacent to the south-western corner of the racecourse (24.8926°S 152.3525°E).

Avenell Heights Church of Christ was built from timber in 1950. A new brick church was built in 1980 with the 1950 church now serving as the church hall.

Citicoast Church was built in 1985 from concrete blocks.

Hinkler Seventh-Day Adventist Church iwas built in 1987.

The Bundaberg Salvation Army church was built in brick in 2015.

== Demographics ==
In the 2016 census, Avenell Heights had a population of 4,871 people.

In the 2021 census, Avenell Heights had a population of 5,028 people.

== Education ==
There are no schools in Avenell Heights. The nearest government primary schools are Walkervale State School in neighbouring Walkervale to the north and Thabeban State School in neighbouring Thabeban to the south. The nearest government secondary schools are Bundaberg State High School in Bundaberg South to the north and Kepnock State High School in neighbouring Kepnock to the north-east.

== Amenities ==
Avenell Heights Progress Association operate a community hall at 2A Thabeban Street (24.89161°S 152.35869°E).

Citicoast Church is at 140 Elliott Heads Road (24.884703°S 152.3784°E). It is affiliated with the International Network of Churches.

Hinkler Seventh-Day Adventist Church is at 12 Heaps Street (24.893967°S 152.3589°E).

Avenell Heights Church of Christ is at 24 Sims Road (24.887514°S 152.3616°E). It is also known as Cross Roads Biker Church.

Bundaberg Salvation Army is at 110 McCarthy Street (24.89049°S 152.37561°E).

There are a number of parks in the area:

- Allawah Street Park (24.8866°S 152.3864°E)
- Boreham Park (24.8889°S 152.3670°E)
- Boreham Park Oval (24.8895°S 152.3674°E)
- Keys Street Park (24.8885°S 152.3747°E)
- Mccarthy Street Park (24.8923°S 152.3704°E)
- Mikkelsen Street Park (24.8958°S 152.3561°E)
- Thabeban Road Park (24.8901°S 152.3550°E)
- Woolley Street Park (24.8905°S 152.3725°E)
