= Goodwood Road =

Goodwood Road may refer to a number of roads:

- Goodwood Road, Bundaberg, a road to the south of Bundaberg, Queensland
- Goodwood Road, Adelaide, a road to the south of Adelaide, South Australia
- Goodwood Road, Hobart, link road to the Bowen Bridge in Hobart, Tasmania
