= Thabeban, Queensland =

Thabeban Bundaberg, Queensland
- Coordinates: 24.9038°S 152.3594°E
- Population: 2,971 (2021 census)
  - Density: 390.9/km^{2} (1,012/sq mi)
- Postcode(s): 4670
- Area: 7.6 km^{2} (2.9 sq mi)
- Time zone: AEST (UTC+10:00)
- Location: 4.0 km (2 mi) SSE of Bundaberg CBD; 362 km (225 mi) N of Brisbane
- LGA(s): Bundaberg Region
- State electorate(s): Burnett; Bundaberg
- Federal division(s): Hinkler
Suburbs around Thabeban:
Norville	Avenell Heights	Avenell Heights
Kensington	Thabeban	Woongarra
Alloway	Alloway	Alloway

Thabeban is a suburb of Bundaberg in the Bundaberg Region, Queensland, Australia. In the 2021 census, Thabeban had a population of 2,971 people.

== Geography ==
The Bundaberg Ring Road passes from east to west through Thabeban, while the North Coast railway line passes from south to north. Although there is a Thabeban railway station, it is not in the suburb but on the border of the suburbs to the north, Norville and Avenell Heights.

== History ==
Thabeban State School opened on 30 April 1917.

St Luke's Anglican church was dedicated by Assistant Bishop Schultz on 27 May 1984. Its closure on 21 February 2004 was approved by Assistant Bishop Appleby.

== Demographics ==
In the 2016 census, Thabeban had a population of 2,840 people.

In the 2021 census, Thabeban had a population of 2,971 people.

== Education ==
Thabeban State School is a government primary (Prep-6) school for boys and girls at 270 Goodwood Road (24.8983°S 152.3636°E). In 2018, the school had an enrolment of 138 students with 12 teachers (10 full-time equivalent) and 29 non-teaching staff (19 full-time equivalent).

There are no secondary schools in Thabeban. The nearest government secondary schools are Bundaberg State High School in Bundaberg South to the north and Kepnock State High School in Kepnock to the north-east.

There are a number of non-government schools in Bundaberg and its suburbs.
