= Clayton railway station =

Clayton railway station may refer to:

- Clayton railway station, Melbourne, on the Pakenham and Cranbourne lines in Victoria, Australia
- Clayton railway station, Queensland, a closed railway station on the North Coast railway line
- Clayton railway station (England), a closed railway station in Bradford, England

== See also ==
- Clayton West railway station, terminus of the Kirklees light railway in West Yorkshire, England
- Clayton station, on the Blue Line, St. Louis MetroLink, Missouri
