= Norville, Queensland =

Norville
- Suburb
- Interactive map of Norville
- Coordinates: 24.8913°S 152.3455°E
- Country: Australia
- State: Queensland
- City: Bundaberg
- LGA: Bundaberg Region
- Location: 3.5 km (2.2 mi) SE of Bundaberg Central; 366 km (227 mi) N of Brisbane

Government
  - State electorate: Bundaberg
  - Federal division: Hinkler

Area
  - Total: 3.5 km^{2} (1.4 sq mi)

Population
  - Total: 2,476 (2021 census)
  - Density: 707/km^{2} (1,832/sq mi)
- Time zone: UTC+10:00 (AEST)
- Postcode: 4670
Suburbs around Norville
Svensson Heights	Bundaberg West	Bundaberg South
Svensson Heights	Norville	Walkervale
Kensington	Thabeban	Avenell Heights

Norville is an inner suburb of Bundaberg in the Bundaberg Region, Queensland, Australia. In the 2021 census, Norville had a population of 2,476 people.

== History ==
St Anne's Anglican church was dedicated on 27 July 1965 by Reverend A.L. Gillespie. Its closure on 17 February 2007 was approved by Assistant Bishop Holland.

Bundaberg Special School opened on 27 January 1970.

Norville State School opened on 25 January 1971.

Shalom College opened in 1984 and is the amalgamation of the Christian Brothers College for boys and Loyola College for girls.

In 2010, eight secondary schools in the Bundaberg area along with Bundaberg TAFE College worked together to establish the Bundaberg Regional Trade Training Centre to provide advanced facilities for trade training for students of those schools.

== Demographics ==
In the 2016 census, Norville had a population of 2,409 people.

In the 2021 census, Norville had a population of 2,476 people.

== Education ==
Norville State School is a government primary (Early Childhood-6) school for boys and girls at 1 Dr Mays Road (24.8865°S 152.3365°E). In 2018, the school had an enrolment of 656 students with 58 teachers (53 full-time equivalent) and 38 non-teaching staff (23 full-time equivalent). It includes a special education program.

Bundaberg Special School is a special primary and secondary (Prep-12) school for boys and girls at 1 Dr Mays Road (24.8868°S 152.3388°E). In 2018, the school had an enrolment of 113 students with 36 teachers (32 full-time equivalent) and 49 non-teaching staff (31 full-time equivalent).

Shalom College is a Catholic secondary (7–12) school for boys and girls at 9 Fitzgerald Street (24.8944°S 152.3392°E).

Bundaberg Regional Trade Training Centre is a secondary (9-12) specialised education unit at 118 Walker Street (24.8805°S 152.3445°E) providing trade training skills to a number of local secondary schools.

There are no mainstream secondary schools in Norville. The nearest government secondary school is Bundaberg State High School in neighbouring Bundaberg South to the north-east.
