= South Sea Islander Church =

South Sea Islander Church and Hall
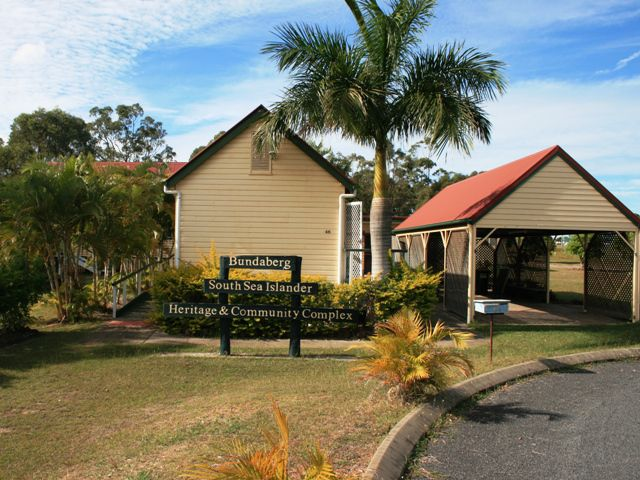
- South Sea Islander Church and Hall, 2009

- Location within Queensland Location within Australia
- 24.8812°S 152.3216°E
- Location: 46 Johnston Street, Millbank, Bundaberg, Bundaberg Region, Queensland, Australia

History
- Design period: 1919–1930s (interwar period)
- Built: c. 1920

Queensland Heritage Register
- Official name: South Sea Islander Church and Hall
- Type: state heritage (built)
- Designated: 28 July 2000
- Reference no.: 602052
- Significant period: 1920s (historical); 1920s–ongoing (social)
- Significant components: furniture/fittings, church, church hall/sunday school hall

South Sea Islander Church and Hall is a heritage-listed church at 46 Johnston Street, Millbank in Bundaberg, Bundaberg Region, Queensland, Australia. It was built c. 1920. It was added to the Queensland Heritage Register on 28 July 2000.

== History ==
The South Sea Islander Church and Hall were built c. 1920 on the Fairymead sugar plantation to cater to the spiritual needs of the South Sea Islander population, many of whom were labourers on the plantation. The church and hall were removed from the Fairymead site in 1995 and relocated to a section of the Bundaberg Cemetery where many South Sea Islander people have been buried. The land on which the Fairymead plantation was established was originally part of the cattle property "Tantitha". The owners of the property, A and AH Brown sold it to the Young family. Trading as AH and E Young, Arthur, Horace and Ernest Young harvested their first cane crop in 1882. Juice was punted to Millaquin until Fairymead became a complete sugar mill in 1884. Fairymead was floated into a public company, Fairymead Sugar Company, in 1912.

Florence Young, sister of Fairymead's founders, was secretary of the Queensland Kanaka Mission (QKM). Young ran religious and educational classes for Islanders and later did missionary work in the Pacific and Asia. In October 1895, it was reported that in Bundaberg the "... largest plantations, are Messrs. Gibson Bros, Bingera and Fairymead, the property of H and E Young". It was also reported that the "religious education [of the South Sea Islander plantation workers] is well looked after, and on the leading plantations churches and schools have been specifically provided for them ... Christianity is spreading amongst them, and making its influence felt...".

Florence Young was born in October 1856. Settling in Sydney in 1878, after the death of her parents she moved to Fairymead in 1882. Almost immediately, Young began to hold prayer meetings for planters' families. Young conducted classes in pidgin English, using pictures, biblical phrases and a chrysalis to explain resurrection. Under Young's guidance, the Queensland Kanaka Mission (QKM) was formally established at Fairymead in 1886 as an evangelical and non-denominational church. The QKM aimed to prepare South Sea Islanders for membership of established Christian churches after their repatriation and employed paid missionaries and members of Young's family. At its height in 1904–1905, the QKM engaged nineteen missionaries and 118 unpaid "native teachers" and claimed 2150 conversions. Young also established the South Sea Evangelical Mission (SSEM), which became a branch of the QKM in 1904. Florence Young administered the SSEM from Sydney and Katoomba and made annual visits to the islands until 1926.

As early as 1889, Queensland Government Inspector Caulfield believed the behaviour of several South Sea Islanders had been improved by religious teaching. One employer at first sceptical of her plans, later told Young that the lessons kept the boys on the plantation on Saturdays whereas they had formerly gone to town to drink. It has been suggested that plantation owners probably extracted as much material as possible from the missionaries' work, in categorising them as a stabilising factor in a society which viewed the repercussions of activities in town with trepidation, but it could be said that the missionaries may well have reduced the level of tension created by the presence of an alien element in Bundaberg society.

The church and hall were constructed c. 1920 on the Fairymead plantation, replacing an earlier hall. The buildings were constructed after the departure of Young from Bundaberg, who continued to travel to the islands and spent much time in Katoomba, administering the South Sea Evangelical Mission. They are, nevertheless, reminders of the continued influence of Christian Missionaries and their work in the Bundaberg area.

The South Sea Islander Church and Hall were moved to their present location in 1995 when a portion of the Bundaberg Cemetery was set aside for historical and cultural purposes. The church and hall continue to be utilised by the South Sea Islander community and remain as a tangible link between the community and the experiences of their ancestors.

== Description ==
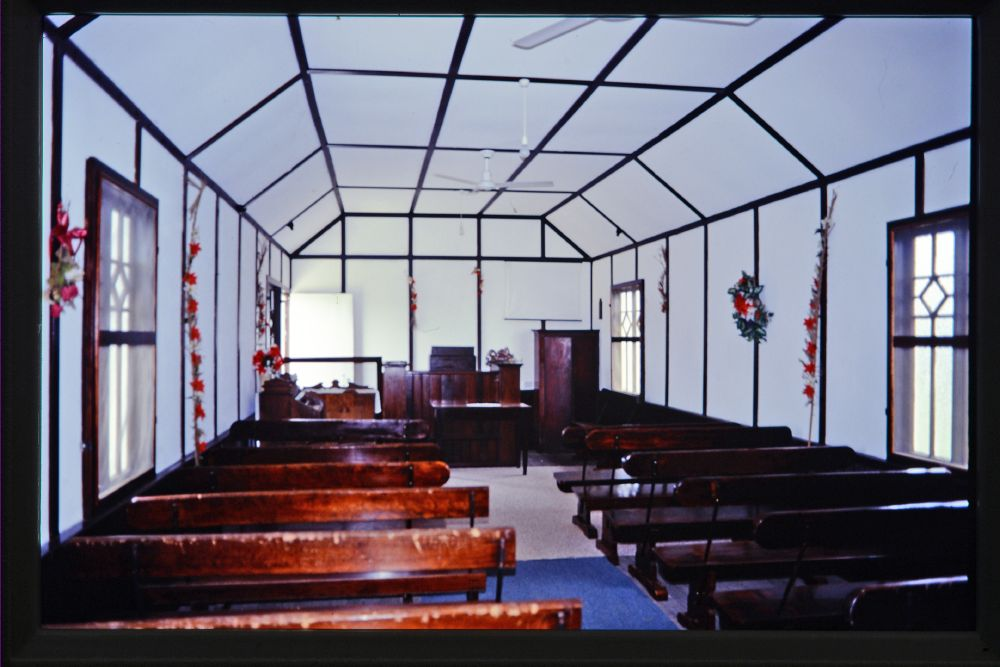
Church interior, 2000

The South Sea Islander Church is a single-storey, timber building, set on concrete stumps, with a gabled roof clad with corrugated iron. The church is clad externally with chamferboards. Louvred timber ventilators are located high in the west & east elevations (gable ends). Two sets of casement windows are located in the north & south elevations (long ends). Each window has a simple, diamond decorative motif in the central panel. There is an entry door and set of timber stairs at each end of the church in the southern elevation. Ramp access has been recently added to the church.

Internally, the timber lined church has been painted white, incorporating a stained timber framework. The church houses original timber pews, timber altar and an organ.

The hall is a single storey timber building, set on concrete stumps, clad with weatherboards and a gabled roof clad with corrugated iron. A pair of double hung sash windows are located in the western, eastern and southern elevations. Internally, as the cladding is single skin, the building framework is exposed. The floor is timber. A timber staircase is located on the southern side of the building.

Both buildings are located within picturesque grounds, including landscaped garden beds dedicated to various families.

== Heritage listing ==
South Sea Islander Church and Hall was listed on the Queensland Heritage Register on 28 July 2000 having satisfied the following criteria.

The place is important in demonstrating the evolution or pattern of Queensland's history.

A good, intact example of a simple missionary church and hall, the South Sea Islander Church and Hall are significant for their strong association with the South Sea Islander community and the exploitation of this large workforce employed in the Bundaberg district, one of the most affluent sugar districts in the state, in the late 19th and early 20th centuries. Importantly, the church and hall have a strong association for the present local South Sea Islander community and the experiences of their ancestors in Queensland.

The place is important in demonstrating the principal characteristics of a particular class of cultural places.

A good, intact example of a simple missionary church and hall.

The place is important because of its aesthetic significance.

Located within picturesque grounds, including landscaped garden beds dedicated to various families, the church and hall are important for their aesthetic contribution to the site. Internally, the original timber pews, altar and organ contribute to the aesthetic significance of the church.

The place has a strong or special association with a particular community or cultural group for social, cultural or spiritual reasons.

Moved to the site in order that they may be closer to the graves of ancestral members of the South Sea Islander community, the South Sea Islander Church and Hall are significant for their continued association with ancestral worship.
