= Shalom Catholic College =

Shalom College

Location
- 9 Fitzgerald Street, Norville; Bundaberg, Queensland; Australia; 24°53′44″S 152°20′20″E

Information
- Religious affiliation: Catholicism
- Established: 1984
- Oversight: Diocese of Rockhampton
- Principal: Dean Wearmouth
- Enrolment: c. 1,530
- Colors: Red, white, and black
- Website: www.shalomcollege.com

Shalom College is an independent Catholic secondary school, located in Norville, Bundaberg, Queensland, Australia. The college was established in 1984 after the merging of the Christian Brothers' College for Boys and the Loyola College for Girls. The school's current principal is Dean Wearmouth. In 2023, there were 1529 students enrolled at the school, as well as approximately 240 staff members.

== Campus ==
The main campus is set amongst 13 hectares (32 acres) of bushland off of Fitzgerald Street. Shalom College welcomes students of all faiths, but requires parents to agree to actively support its religious education program and Christian ethos. Shalom College's Chaverim campus of 85 hectares (210 acres) is located at South Bingera, 23 kilometres (14 mi) south-west of Bundaberg. Students can use its facilities for camps and are offered activities such as canoeing, rock-climbing or archery. The land on which the school is built was donated by Walter Adams. Adams is buried in the Catholic cemetery, adjacent to the school grounds on Fitzgerald Street. The college house "Adams" was named for him.

== Pastoral houses ==
The ten pastoral houses are as follows:

Name	Colour	Patron	Virtue	Notes
Adams	Blue	Walter Adams	Generosity	Donated the land on which the college stands
Chisholm	Lime green	Caroline Chisholm	Compassion	Assisted poor women immigrants
Hogan	Red	Joseph Hogan	Vision	Leader in Catholic education in Bundaberg
Lingiari	Orange	Vincent Lingiari	Justice	Activist for land rights and equality for Aboriginal Australians
Damien	Magenta	St Damien of Molokai	Dignity	Priest who ministered to a leper colony until his death in 1889
MacKillop	Purple	Mary MacKillop	Courage	First Australian saint and founder of the Sisters of St Joseph of the Sacred Heart
McAuley	Forest green	Catherine McAuley	Mercy	Founder of the Sisters of Mercy
McCormack	Teal	Sr Irene McCormack RSJ	Solidarity	Australian nun who worked as a missionary in Peru until her assassination by members of Sendero Luminoso in 1991
Rice	Yellow	Edmund Rice	Liberation	Founder of the Christian Brothers in Ireland
Walsh	Maroon	Paddy Walsh	Valour	Parish priest in Bundaberg and chaplain in Changi Prisoner-of-War Camp

Each house has four house leaders: traditionally two male and two female, although this is not enforced.

== Sports ==
A range of sports and extra-curricular activities are offered. These activities include soccer, basketball, softball, netball, rugby league, rugby union, rowing, surfing and tenpin bowling. SCASA, (Shalom College After School Activities) run 4 afternoons a week with students receiving afternoon tea.

== Notable alumni ==
- Simon Doyle – Australian 1500m men's champion 1990
- Felise Kaufusi – rugby league footballer for Redcliffe Dolphins and Queensland

== See also ==
- List of schools in Queensland
- Catholic education in Australia
