= Bundaberg Central State School =

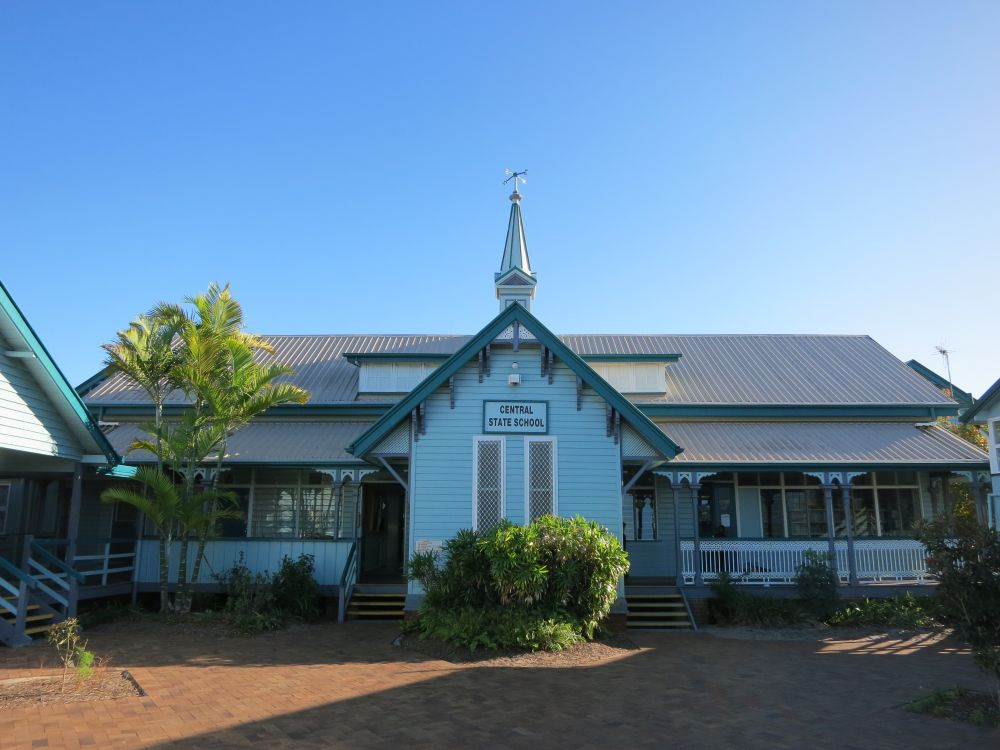
- Bundaberg Central State School central block, 2014

- Location within Queensland
- 24.8694°S 152.3482°E
- Location: 13 Crofton Street, Bundaberg Central, Bundaberg, Bundaberg Region, Queensland, Australia

History
- Built: 1890, 1900–1907, Playsheds (1900, 1907)
- Built for: Department of Public Instruction

Site notes
- Architect(s): Robert and John Ferguson; Queensland Department of Public Works
- Architectural style: Carpenter Gothic

Queensland Heritage Register
- Official name: Bundaberg Central State School; Bundaberg South State School
- Type: state heritage
- Designated: 28 November 2014
- Reference no.: 601533
- Type: Education, research, scientific facility: School-state
- Theme: Educating Queenslanders: Providing primary schooling
- Builders: William Calvert

Bundaberg Central State School is a heritage-listed state school at 13 Crofton Street, Bundaberg Central, Bundaberg, Bundaberg Region, Queensland, Australia. It was designed by Robert and John Ferguson and the Queensland Department of Public Works and built in 1890 by William Calvert. It is also known as Bundaberg South State School. It was added to the Queensland Heritage Register on 28 November 2014.

== History ==
The school now known as Bundaberg Central State School was established, as Bundaberg South State School in January 1875, on a site in Bourbong Street, transferring to its current site at Crofton Street in July 1890. The original school building on the Crofton Street site was completed in 1890 to a standard design by architects Robert and John Ferguson. As the town and pupil numbers grew, the school expanded, with two playsheds (1900, 1907) and landscape elements such as mature trees and a forestry plot of hoop pine trees (ca.1955). The school has been a focus for the local community as a place of important social and cultural activity for more than a century.

Traditionally the land of the Kalki people, European settlement of the Burnett area began with pastoral settlement in the 1840s and 1850s. Timber cutters arrived in the mid-1860s. Selection of land around Bundaberg started in 1867 under the "Sugar and Coffee Regulations" of the Crown Lands Alienation Act 1860, which aimed to promote agriculture and closer settlement. The site of Bundaberg was officially surveyed in 1869. The town's development as a port and service centre was boosted by growing coastal traffic and by its designation as the port for Mount Perry's copper mining from 1881. Surrounded by sugar plantations and the site of two sugar refineries, Bundaberg became an important sugar town as the sugar industry boomed from the 1880s.

In 1871 a school reserve was created on the site of Bundaberg's present day Buss Park, Christ Church Anglican Church and the Civic Centre in the centre of town. The local community raised the required finance for the first buildings of Bundaberg South State School, which were completed by January 1875. The average attendance was 123 pupils in July 1875.

The provision of state-administered education was important to the colonial governments of Australia. National schools were established in 1848 in New South Wales and continued in Queensland following the colony's creation in 1859. After the introduction of the Education Act 1860, Queensland's public schools grew from four in 1860 to 230 by 1875. The State Education Act 1875 provided for free, compulsory and secular primary education and the establishment of the Department of Public Instruction. This further standardised the provision of education, and despite difficulties, achieved the remarkable feat of bringing basic literacy to most Queensland children by 1900.

The establishment of schools was considered an essential step in the development of early communities and integral to their success. Locals often donated land and labour for a school's construction and the school community contributed to maintenance and development. Schools became a community focus, a symbol of progress, and a source of pride, with enduring connections formed with past pupils, parents, and teachers. The inclusion of war memorials and community halls reinforced these connections and provided a focus/venue for a wide range of community events in schools across Queensland.

In September 1883, separation of the school into a boys' school and a girls' and infants' school was approved by the Department of Public Instruction. Bundaberg South Boys' School opened in a new building on the site, while the Bundaberg South Girls' and Infants' School opened as a separate school in the existing school building.

By the 1880s the school site had become valuable real estate, prompting the town council to repeatedly attempt to have the school moved. Finally, in 1889, the Minister for Public Instruction directed that the school transfer to a new site, two blocks to the south of the existing school, as it was in the interest of the public to have the old site for business purposes.

Consequently, a new building for the Girls' and Infants' School was built by William Calvert for £2600 on the new site, which occupied a whole block bounded by Woondooma, Barolin, Crofton and Maryborough streets. The Boys' School and its building were moved to the new site and the new Girls' and Infants' School was completed by July 1890.

Bundaberg South Girls' and Infants' State School was built to a standard plan supplied by the Queensland Government. The government developed standard plans for its school buildings to help ensure consistency and economy. From the 1860s until the 1960s, Queensland school buildings were predominantly timber-framed, an easy and cost-effective approach that also enabled the government to provide facilities in remote areas. Standard designs were continually refined in response to changing needs and educational philosophy and Queensland school buildings were particularly innovative in climate control, lighting, and ventilation. Standardisation produced distinctly similar schools across Queensland with complexes of typical components.

In 1879 the Department of Public Instruction appointed architect Robert Ferguson as its first superintendent of school building design. He immediately revised the design of schools to address deficiencies in ventilation and lighting and this period of school design was pivotal in this regard. Ferguson introduced tall and decorative ventilation spires to the roof and louvred panels to the gable apex to vent the classrooms. Additional and larger windows were introduced with high sill heights that did not allow draughts and sunlight to enter the room. The overall form was lowset on brick piers and in larger schools, multiple classrooms were arranged symmetrically around a parade ground. The designs remained single-skin to eliminate "receptacles for germs and vermin" but were lined externally rather than internally to address the previous weathering problem. Importantly, Ferguson's buildings were decoratively treated with a variety of elaborate timber work and were heralded by educationalists as "far superior in design, material and workmanship to any we have before built".

In 1885 Robert Ferguson was replaced as Superintendent of Buildings by his brother John Ferguson who continued to implement his brother's designs until John's death in 1893, when responsibility for school buildings passed back to the Department of Public Works. The Ferguson period (1879–1893) is distinct and marked by extensive redesign of school buildings including associated structures and furniture. The Ferguson brothers' designs were reflective of education requirements of the time, responsive to criticism of previous designs, revolutionary in terms of internal environmental quality, technically innovative, popular and successful and provided a long-lasting legacy of good educational design.

The new teaching building for the Bundaberg South Girls' and Infants' State School was constructed to a standard Ferguson design. It comprised three blocks (two identical, one slightly longer) arranged in a symmetrical, U-shaped configuration around a parade ground. Each block was lowset with chamferboard-clad walls, a high-pitched gable roof, verandahs on two sides, and attached teachers' rooms. The buildings were ornamented with timber finials and brackets attached to end gables, typical of the "Carpenter Gothic" style of Ferguson schools. The ceiling structure was exposed on the interior, with the raked ceilings lined with diagonal timber boards. Verandah enclosures for hand basins and hat storage were provided on the parade ground-facing verandahs, which linked the three blocks together. Roof fleches, ventilation panels and window hoods also provided climate control and ventilation to the interiors. Also, a new teacher's residence was constructed in the northeast corner of the site in 1890.

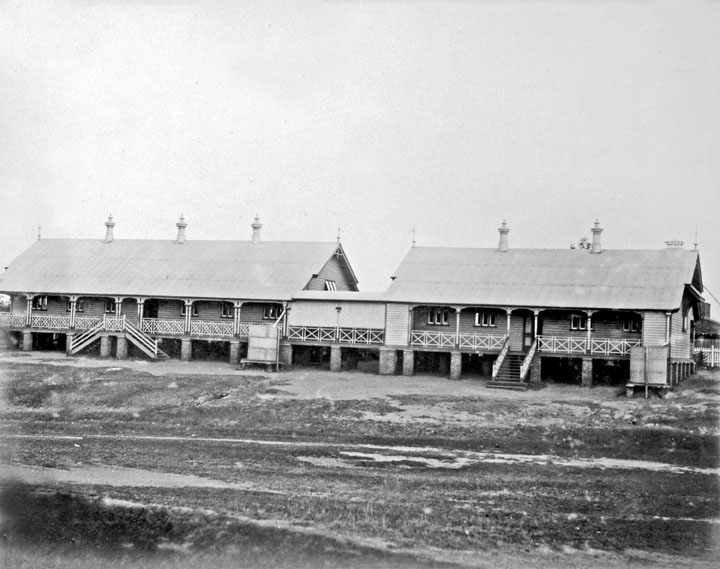
Boys' school, circa 1890

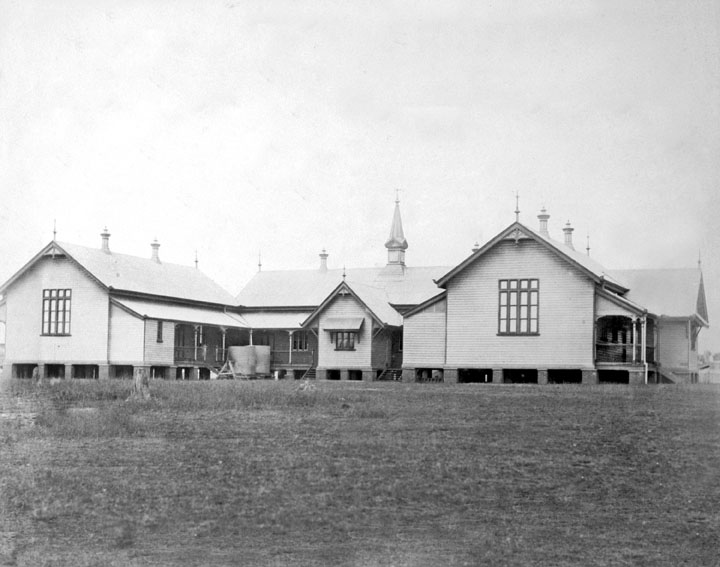
Girls' school, circa 1890

On 3 October 1894 the names of the two schools were changed to "State School for Boys, Bundaberg Central" and "State School for Girls and Infants, Bundaberg Central". The occupation of a school site by a succession of different state primary education institutions is characteristic of many of the larger urban settlements in Queensland where a number of schools were established as the settlement grew and buildings and schools were moved between sites to meet the growing demands of the local populations.

At the turn of the century, two playsheds were constructed to the north of the teaching building: a 10-post playshed in 1900 and a 12-post playshed for boys in 1907. Both were constructed of exposed timber framing and the 1907 playshed had a metal sheet roof with ventilated ridge cap. The Queensland education system recognised the importance of play in the school curriculum and, as well as classrooms, they provided plans for playsheds, free-standing shelters that provided covered play space and were often used for unofficial teaching space when needed. They were timber-framed structures, generally open on all sides although were sometimes partially enclosed with timber boards or corrugated galvanised iron sheets. The hipped (or less frequently, gabled) roofs were clad with timber shingles or corrugated iron and they had an earth or decomposed granite floor. Fixed timber seating ran between the perimeter posts. Playsheds were a typical addition to state schools across Queensland between c. 1880s and the 1950s. They were built to standard designs that ranged in size relative to student numbers. School sites were typically cleared of all vegetation and the provision of all-weather outdoor space was needed. After c. 1909 school buildings were high-set, allowing students to play in the understorey and playsheds were not frequently constructed.

Bundaberg continued to grow steadily in the early decades of the 20th century. On 26 January 1926 the two Bundaberg South schools were amalgamated as the Bundaberg Central State School. Around this time, the Boys' School building, which had been moved onto the site in 1890, was relocated to Bundaberg West State School.

Over time, the Ferguson teaching building at Bundaberg Central State School was altered to meet contemporary educational demands, particularly for improved lighting and ventilation. The Department of Public Works greatly improved the natural ventilation and lighting of classroom interiors, experimenting with different combinations of roof ventilators, ceiling and wall vents, larger windows, dormer windows and ducting. Achieving an ideal or even adequate level of natural light in classrooms, without glare, was of critical importance to educators and consequently it became central to the design of all school buildings. Windows were rearranged and enlarged to provide a greater amount of gentle, southern light into the room and desks were rearranged so that the light would fall onto students' left hand sides to avoid throwing shadows onto the pages; this presupposed that all students were right-handed. This often meant a complete transformation of the fenestration of existing buildings and during the 1920s and 1930s alterations were made to the vast majority of older school buildings. In 1933, alterations to Bundaberg Central State School included new windows added to the gable end walls of the east and west blocks to make them wider and lower than the previous tall windows. New dormer windows were also added to the roof of the central block.

Bundaberg's growth continued after World War II (WWII) with the city council promoting major revitalisation of the city. Many large building programs were completed, including new hospitals, schools, court house, customs house, civic centre, and port, transforming Bundaberg. The population of the town rose from 18,000 in 1952 to 27,000 in 1967.

Bundaberg Central State School grew substantially in the 1950s and 1960s and a number of new buildings were constructed to standard designs by the Department of Public Works and reflected the current education philosophy. Post-WWII, educationalists rejected the previous designs of school buildings, considering them outdated and favoured "lighter, loosely grouped, flexible" buildings. In existing older buildings, verandahs were enclosed for weather protection and verandah balustrades were replaced with bag racks for improved storage. Many buildings had their fenestration altered to increase the amount of light into the classrooms, and many older windows were replaced with modern awning style windows. Alterations to the Ferguson Building occurred between 1963 and 1966 when bag and hat racks replaced most verandah balustrades, glass louvres were installed, casement windows were replaced with awning windows and windows were boarded over in some places.

The school grounds retain remnants of a forestry plot in the northeast quadrant of the site. The creation of forestry plots resulted from after-school agricultural clubs, which were introduced in 1923 at primary schools, under the "home project" scheme. Curriculum-driven, these clubs had a secondary commercial value as well as disseminating information and helping to develop a range of skills. The Department of Primary Industry provided suitable plants and offered horticultural advice. School forestry plots were seen by the government as a way of educating the next generation about the economic and environmental importance of trees, as well as providing testing grounds for new species. Located throughout the state, the plots were a means of experimenting with a variety of tree species in different soil and climatic conditions. The sale of timber grown in school plots provided an additional source of income for the school, and the plots themselves were an attractive feature of school grounds. The first school forestry plot was established at Marburg State Rural School in 1928, where 275 exotic and indigenous trees were planted. Encouraged by the Education and Forestry Departments, by 1953 about 380 Queensland schools were undertaking forestry projects, with students responsible for planting, maintaining and studying the plots. The forestry plot at Bundaberg Central State School was established by 1955, with two sections of hoop pines (Araucaria cunninghamii) planted on the sloping ground between the school residence and the gully (formerly a creek) which runs diagonally across the northeast corner of the school grounds.

Alteration of the central block of the Ferguson Building occurred in 1973 to convert it into a library and included the removal of internal partitions and the relocation of some doors. Further changes to this block occurred in 1981 with insertion of partitions to form a staff room, a health services room and a waiting room. In 1978, the western (1900) playshed was rotated 90 degrees and relocated slightly to the west, providing more space for buildings constructed between the two playsheds.

Changes to the Ferguson building since the 1980s have included the removal of windows in all gable end walls, the enclosure of the parade ground-facing verandahs of the east and west blocks, and the creation of large openings between the classrooms and enclosed verandahs. Beginning around the 1970s and resulting from expansions in Queensland education provision, the partial demolition of the wall between a classroom and its enclosed verandah was a typical alteration to provide an extension of the classroom. This was a very widespread solution for older buildings to meet the increased spatial needs advocated by educationalists.

Centenary celebrations held in 1975 included the publication of a centenary history of the school and the unveiling by the Hon. Joh Bjelke-Petersen, Premier of Queensland, of a centenary plaque. A similar plaque commemorating the school's 125th anniversary, in 2000, was unveiled by local member of the Queensland Legislative Assembly, Nita Cunningham.

As at 2014, Bundaberg Central State School continues to operate from its 1890 site. The school retains the 1880s Ferguson building, the 1900 and 1907 playsheds and remnants of its forestry plot. It is important to the city having operated from the site since 1890 and having educated generations of Bundaberg students. Since establishment the school has been a key social focus for the Bundaberg community with the grounds and buildings having been the location of many social events.

== Description ==
Bundaberg Central State School occupies almost a whole city block just south of the Bundaberg CBD in a predominantly commercial area. It is bounded by Woondooma Street to the north, Barolin Street to the east, Crofton Street to the south and Maryborough Street to the west. The school addresses Crofton Street and all school buildings are located at the western end of the site. Playing fields, a forestry plot of mature hoop pines and other mature trees occupy the remainder of the school property, with a gully (formerly a creek) running diagonally across the northeast corner. The significant buildings are an 1890 Ferguson designed teaching building and two playsheds, built in 1900 and 1907. No other buildings or structures are of cultural heritage significance. The former school residence, located in the northeast corner of the block, is in private ownership and no longer forms part of the school grounds.

The Ferguson building is set back from Crofton Street with gardens and other school buildings between it and the street so that only the centre portion is visible. The building is composed of three blocks arranged symmetrically in a U-shape around a former parade ground, linked by a continuous verandah on the parade ground side. The east and west blocks are a mirror image of each other and contain two classrooms each, while the central block is slightly longer in size and contains a library and offices. Four former teachers' rooms are attached to the verandahs - one each on the outer verandah of the east and west blocks, and on both sides of the central block. The inner verandahs of the east and west blocks have been enclosed. The building retains much of its original, high-quality, finely crafted timber ornamentation.

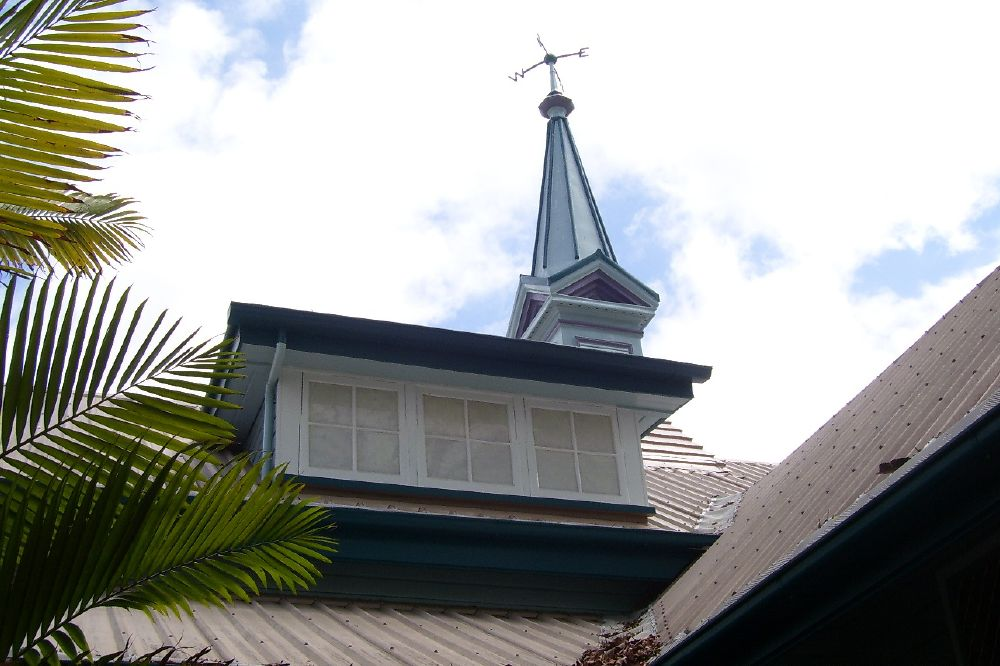
Weather vane on finial, 2006

Each block is timber-framed, lowset on brick piers with timber chamferboard wall cladding. The steeply pitched gable roofs are clad in modern rib-and-pan metal roof sheeting. The roof of the central block has four dormer windows and a large ventilation spire with weather vane finial. The gable end walls feature decorative brackets and timberwork, and have triangular ventilation panels of fixed timber louvres at the gable peak. Decorative timber brackets also support the eaves and window hoods of the former teachers' rooms.

The verandahs are timber framed with a skillion roof separate to the main roof. Their raked ceilings are lined with timber vertically jointed, tongue-and-groove boards and the exposed rafters are stop-chamfered. Triangular panels of fixed timber louvres are located at the end of each verandah section. Timber verandah posts feature decorative cornices and brackets and most are stop-chamfered. Where verandahs have been enclosed the verandah posts have been incorporated into the structure and remain visible. Sections of high-quality cast iron balustrade, supported by timber top and bottom rails, are located on the western verandah of the western block and the southern verandah of the central block. Most other balustrades have been replaced by bag racks. Small sections of early timber verandah enclosures survive at the northern ends of the eastern and western blocks. Access to the verandahs is via short flights of timber steps, most of which remain in their early locations on either side of attached teachers' rooms or in the centre of the inner verandahs.

Most early windows have been in-filled or replaced by banks of glass adjustable louvres, however some survive in the former teachers' rooms. These consist of tall, narrow, double hung sashes or casement windows. Early doors are timber, low-waisted double doors, some of which retain tall fanlights above. The eastern former teacher's room has a low-waisted, single leaf door with evidence of early door hardware.

Internally, all blocks have timber floors (lined with modern vinyl and carpet), walls lined with vertical v-jointed tongue-and-groove boards, and raked ceilings lined with diagonal v-jointed boards. The Queen post roof trusses are exposed within the rooms, revealing decorative features such as stop-chamfered edges and turned timber pendants. Early internal partition walls are single-skin with exposed timber framing and are lined with vertical, beaded tongue-and-groove boards. Large openings have been created in the classroom partition walls and in some verandah walls where the verandah has been enclosed. Some early school furniture and artefacts remain within the building, including a brass school bell with mount and swinger attachment.

The former teachers' rooms have coved ceilings and are lined internally with timber v-jointed boards or beaded tongue and groove boards. The ceilings are coved and have a ventilation panel. Walls have timber picture rails and skirtings.

An attached room (built 1965, currently used as an office) and modern partitions and suspended ceilings in the western end of the central block, forming offices and a staff room, are not of cultural heritage significance.

To the north of the Ferguson building are the two playsheds. Both are timber framed with a hipped roof clad in corrugated metal sheeting and a modern concrete slab floor. The 10-post western playshed (1900) is aligned north–south with a perimeter partition of vertical timber boards at the southern end. The 12-post eastern shed (1907) is aligned east–west and has a perimeter partition at the western end. The posts are braced to the roof framing by brackets and the roof framing is exposed.

The school oval occupies lower ground than the school, separated by a low, battered, concrete and stone wall. Along the northern edge of the oval, the forestry plot consists of two groups of hoop pine trees, planted in rows, along the sloping northern edge of the gully. Other trees, such as a row of mature gum trees, have also been planted in the area. A large mature fig tree stands to the west of the former teacher's residence. Other mature trees are found in various locations in the school grounds.

== Heritage listing ==
Bundaberg Central State School was listed on the Queensland Heritage Register on 28 November 2014 having satisfied the following criteria.

The place is important in demonstrating the evolution or pattern of Queensland's history.

Bundaberg Central State School (established 1875) is important in demonstrating the evolution of state education and its associated architecture in Queensland. It retains a complex of excellent, representative examples of standard government designs that were architectural responses to prevailing government education philosophies.

The Ferguson teaching building (1890) is an early standardised design; the two playsheds (1900, 1907) demonstrate the education system's recognition of the importance of play in the curriculum; and the forestry plot is evidence of a popular educational initiative that conveyed the economic and environmental importance of forestry to students while creating an attractive landscape feature and income for schools.

Bundaberg Central State School is important in demonstrating, through its size and high quality decorative features, the expansion of Bundaberg as a centre of the sugar industry from the 1880s, an industry important in the development of Queensland.

The place is important in demonstrating the principal characteristics of a particular class of cultural places.

Bundaberg Central State School is important in demonstrating the principal characteristics of Queensland state schools, comprising a complex of buildings constructed to standard designs by the Department of Public Works.

The Ferguson school building (1890) retains its lowset, symmetrical, U-shaped plan form of large classrooms surrounded by generous verandahs with projecting teachers' rooms; high-quality decorative features such as timberwork, cast iron balustrades and a tall ventilation spire; and internal features such as raked ceilings with exposed queen post roof trusses and some original partitions and doors.

The playsheds (1900, 1907) each have open sides and a hipped, timber-framed roof supported on braced timber posts.

The place is important because of its aesthetic significance.

Highly intact, the Ferguson teaching building has aesthetic significance as an attractive building of high-quality materials and construction with a well-composed, symmetrical plan and elevations, and decorative, finely crafted timber work, including a ventilation spire.

The place has a strong or special association with a particular community or cultural group for social, cultural or spiritual reasons.

Queensland schools have always played an important part in Queensland communities. They typically retain a significant and enduring connection with former pupils, their parents, and teachers; provide a venue for social interaction and volunteer work; and are a source of pride, symbolising local progress and aspirations. Bundaberg Central State School has a strong and ongoing association with the Bundaberg community. Operating since 1885 it has taught generations of Bundaberg children. The place is important for its contribution to the educational development of Bundaberg and is a prominent community focal point and gathering place for social events with widespread community support.

== See also ==
- List of schools in Wide Bay–Burnett
- History of state education in Queensland
