= Walkervale, Queensland =

Walkervale Bundaberg, Queensland
- Coordinates: 24.8830°S 152.3580°E
- Population: 2,981 (2021 census)
  - Density: 1,750/km^{2} (4,540/sq mi)
- Postcode(s): 4670
- Area: 1.7 km^{2} (0.7 sq mi)
- Time zone: AEST (UTC+10:00)
- Location: 1.6 km (1 mi) S of Bundaberg CBD; 372 km (231 mi) N of Brisbane
- LGA(s): Bundaberg Region
- State electorate(s): Bundaberg
- Federal division(s): Hinkler
Suburbs around Walkervale:
Bundaberg West	Bundaberg South	Bundaberg South
Norville	Walkervale	Kepnock
Norville	Avenell Heights	Avenell Heights

Walkervale is a suburb of Bundaberg in the Bundaberg Region, Queensland, Australia. In the 2021 census, Walkervale had a population of 2,981 people.

== Geography ==
The North Coast railway line runs along the western boundary of the suburb; there is no railway station in the suburb.

== History ==
In 1946, land was purchased at 139 Barolin Street (24.8851°S 152.3558°E) to build a Catholic church and school. St Mary's Catholic Church was blessed and opened on 9 December 1951 by Bishop Andrew Tynan. On Tuesday 11 February 2020, the church was destroyed by a fire, believed to be arson.

South Bundaberg Methodist Church was at 32 Alice Street (24.882769°S 152.3591°E). Designed by Cook & Kerrison, the timber church was built in 1949. Following the amalgamation of Methodist Church into the Uniting Church of Australia in 1977, it ceased to be a Methodist/Uniting church and became Bundaberg Presbyterian Church.

Walkervale State School opened on 24 January 1955. A swimming pool was built in 1961.

== Demographics ==
In the 2016 census, Walkervale had a population of 2,987 people.

In the 2021 census, Walkervale had a population of 2,981 people.

== Education ==
Walkervale State School is a government primary (Early Childhood-6) school for boys and girls at 46a Hurst Street (24.8851°S 152.3596°E). In 2017, the school had an enrolment of 437 students with 37 teachers (32 full-time equivalent) and 24 non-teaching staff (15 full-time equivalent). It includes a special education program.

There are no secondary schools in Walkervale; the nearest government secondary schools are Bundaberg State High School in neighbouring Bundaberg South to the north and Kepnock State High school in neighbouring Kepnock to the east.

== Amenities ==
Bundaberg Presbyterian Church is at 32 Alice Street (24.882769°S 152.3591°E).
