= Elliot railway station =

Former railway station in Queensland, Australia

Elliot

General information
- Location: Elliot Siding Road, Goodwood, Queensland (access from Goodwood Road)
- Coordinates: 24°58′45″S 152°22′30″E
- Line: North Coast Line
- Connections: no connections

History
- Closed: Yes

Services
Preceding station	Queensland Rail	Following station
Coonarr towards Brisbane	North Coast line	Alloway towards Cairns
Location

Elliot railway station is a closed railway station on the North Coast railway line, Queensland.
