= Alloway railway station, Queensland =

Former railway station in Queensland, Australia

Alloway

General information
- Location: Alloway Siding Road, Alloway, Queensland (access from Goodwood Road)
- Coordinates: 24°56′48.86″S 152°22′05.98″E
- Line: North Coast Line
- Connections: none

Services
Preceding station	Queensland Rail	Following station
Elliot towards Brisbane	North Coast line	Clayton towards Cairns
Location

Alloway railway station is a closed railway station on the North Coast railway line, Queensland. The name is derived from the Scottish town of Robert Burns fame.
