= Clayton railway station, Queensland =

Former railway station in Queensland, Australia

Clayton

General information
- Location: between Clayton Siding, Thomasens and Callaghans Roads, Alloway, Queensland
- Coordinates: 24°55′31.89″S 152°21′50.30″E
- Line: North Coast Line
- Connections: no connections

History
- Closed: Yes

Services
| Preceding station | Queensland Rail | Following station |
|---|---|---|
| Alloway towards Brisbane | North Coast line | Thabeban towards Cairns |
Location

Clayton railway station is a closed railway station on the North Coast railway line in Queensland. It is named after one of the early settlers in Bundaberg.
