= Land selection in Queensland =

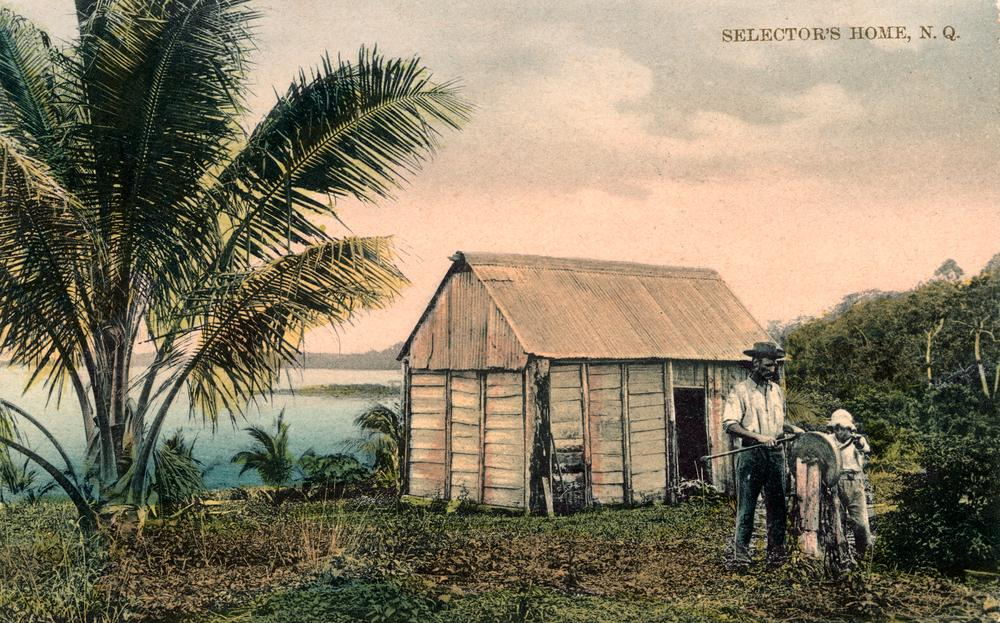
Selector's home in North Queensland, circa 1900

The process of land selection in Queensland in Australia began in 1860. It continued under a series of land acts in subsequent years. When Britain claimed possession of Australia, it did so based on terra nullius (that the land belonged to nobody) and did not acknowledge that Indigenous people had any ownership over the land. All land in Australia became Crown land and was sold or leased by the Australian colonial governments according to the needs of the colonists.

The land was considered the Queensland colony's greatest asset. The prosperity of the colony was measured according to the extent of land settlement. Rent from land leases was the colony's largest revenue earner. The initial political contest was between pastoralists and selectors led by the "town liberals" who desired that immigrants have an equitable right to small land holdings (known as closer settlement). Closer settlement for agricultural purposes was promoted by the Queensland Government who desired settlement by immigrants to Queensland and exports of agricultural produce and raw materials such as cotton and wool to Britain. No group (pastoralists or town liberals) held dominant control over land policy. Legislation was framed with the aim of a comprehensive land policy. However, it was changed from time to time following the energetic efforts by both groups to alter the occupancy conditions and priority for selection, and there was tension between free selection and long leases particularly for pastoral land. Consequently, over 50 principal and amending acts covered all land legislation up to 1910.

== Land selection ==
Queensland governments developed the most comprehensive land legislation and settlement program in Australia in the nineteenth century. The key legislation for land selections since 1860 were:

- Crown Lands Alienation Act 1860
- Crown Lands Alienation Act 1868
- Land Act 1876
- Crown Lands Act 1884
- Land Act 1897
- Land Act 1902
- Closer Settlement Act 1906
- Land Act 1910

The bulk of the land selection in Queensland occurred under the first six acts listed above. There were various land acts in between these dates which dealt with a variety of specialised land settlement policies and developments e.g. village settlements in country areas (very small blocks), commune settlements (1890s), irrigation developments etc. Village settlement land files are held by the Queensland State Archives. Files on the communes have not survived within the Queensland Government.

The various land schemes had many different types of selections. With the opening of new settlement areas the first selections were managed by the relevant agent for that land district. If the land settlement in the new areas was rapid, a new land district was often formed e.g. Cairns – Port Douglas; Cardwell – Innisfail. Land was defined as agricultural, first class pastoral or second class pastoral under the Crown Lands Alienation Act 1868, under which the initial land selection in the colony was done.

The key public servants were the land commissioners, land agents, surveyors and land inspectors. Their roles brought ordered processes and accepted administrative arrangement understood by the selectors.

A proclamation in the Queensland Government Gazette detailed the level of annual rent and the portions of land available for selection and closing date and place for applications to be received. The minimum age for a selector was 16 years and the applicant had to be a natural-born British subject or naturalised British subject; companies could not apply. Selection was competitive. If the applicant was successful, the selector paid the first year's rent and survey fee. The selection was not capable of being mortgaged or transferred (except in the case of death of the licensee). Land orders (often received as an inducement to immigrate to Queensland) could be used in payment of the deposit for a selection. Having obtained access to the land, there were conditions that the selector had to meet. Typically the selector had to "improve" the land by constructing buildings, clearing timber, creating paddocks, building fences, and commencing farming of crops or animals (these conditions were often specified in great detail). The value of each improvement was also stated so that the total invested could be compared to the legislative requirement. Where a selector held several selections located close together the selector could use residence on one as proof of residence for another; however, there were usually limits to the number of selections that a selector could hold in a particular lease area.

Having fulfilled all conditions, the selector could apply for freehold of the selection after the payment of the final rent installment and fees for the survey and the Deed of Grant.

While there were specific soldier settlement schemes for those returning from war service, selectors who undertook war service would be given relief from some of their obligations. Relief was also given to selectors who experienced natural disasters.

Apart from selected lands, other methods of tenure were pastoral leases or freehold land purchased through auctions either in agricultural reserves or as town lots or suburban lots (within 2 miles of a town).

== Crown Lands Alienation Act 1860 ==
Land was open to selection at the fixed price of £1 per acre (£2.5/ha) in agricultural reserves on the shores of navigable waters of Moreton Bay, Wide Bay, Port Curtis and Keppel Bay. The farms were between 40 and 320 acres (16 and 129 ha).

Land could also be purchased at £1 per acre (£2.5/ha) for up to 640 acres (260 ha) for mining (other than for coal or gold).

== Agricultural Reserves Act 1863 ==
This act provided for selection of land in specified agricultural reserves at £1 per acre (£2.5/ha). Six months residence was mandatory and improvements including one-sixth of the area to be cultivated and fencing constructed were essential conditions.

== Crown Land Alienation Act 1868 ==
Any lands in a settled district and not already under pastoral lease were available for selection as agricultural or pastoral land. Any lands in unsettled areas and not already under pastoral lease were available for selection as second class pastoral land. It was announced in the Queensland Government Gazette when districts were open for selection and land agents were appointed in those districts. There were maximum areas which selectors could hold in the colony – 640 acres (260 ha) of agricultural land, 2,560 acres (1,040 ha) of first-class pastoral land, and 7,680 acres (3,110 ha) second-class pastoral land.

If the Queensland Government gave notice of resuming a pastoral lease to offer it for selection, for the following year, the pastoralist had the first option on selecting the land from their leasehold area. They were entitled to select 1 acre (0.40 ha) for each ten shillings of improvements undertaken on the pastoral lease. This enabled the pastoralist to select the best parts of their pastoral lease, such as land alongside rivers and creeks and land close to railway lines, before others could select from the remainder of the pastoral lease.

Selectors paid annual rent to pay off the price of the land set by government. Agricultural land could be converted to freehold in three years if conditions were fulfilled and the balance of the rents was paid. Selections could not be transferred until the conditions were fulfilled and creditors could not obtain control of them until they were freehold.

The act also introduced that improvements could be taken into account in addition to cultivation on selections taken up under the Agricultural Reserves Act 1863 or the Leasing Act 1866.

- Agricultural, first class pastoral and second class pastoral.
- Sugar and Coffee selections. (s.65)
- Agricultural Farms – land within Agricultural Reserves selected under s.12 of under Crown Lands Alienation Act 1860 could be brought under the 1868 act if applied for within six months of assent to the 1868 act.

== Crown Lands Alienation Act 1876 ==
The major change to land selection brought by this act was that the classification of lands was abolished and land was then priced according to the demand for land in various areas of Queensland. Block sizes were reduced. The ballot process was used to deal with competition. The government became more rigorous on occupancy requirements. Efforts to reduce ‘dummying’ by pastoralists were unsuccessful.

- Leased lands before survey
- Conditional (conditional purchase)
- Homestead

== Lands Act 1884 ==
This was a watershed act – often called the ‘Dutton Act’ after the Minister for Lands. WC Hume, surveyor and Land Commissioner on the Darling Downs, became Under Secretary for Lands in 1884. It was believed that his recommendations became the basis for the new act. Pre-emptive purchases by pastoralists were abolished. Selection before survey was permitted in some cases. Agricultural Farms and Grazing Farms were defined as the forms of land selection. Up to 1,280 acres (520 ha; 5.2 km^{2}) could be selected as an Agricultural Farm and purchased (freeholded) after five years and the fulfillment of the residence requirements and investment in improvements. Up to 20,000 acres (8,100 ha; 81 km^{2}) could be selected as a Grazing Farm and held under lease for 30 years. Rents were varied over time after assessment of the selection. The larger areas allowable were due to the land being much further from settled areas and towns and because the land type was likely to be less fertile and watered. The Land Board was formed and became active in determining the annual rents and determination of lands for selection. The powers of the Land Board in respect of selections were declaration of agricultural areas on resumed runs and assess rents every five years for selections.

Criticism of the Land Board was a strong reason for the Royal Commission into Land Settlement generally.

The resulting Crown Lands Act 1897 renamed the Land Board as the Land Court and appeals were permissible. District Land Commissioners continued to deal with applications for selection, forfeitures, rent assessments and reports of fulfillment of conditions.

== Crown Lands Act 1897 ==
The act preserved all the rights under the 1884 act.

The enveloping drought meant that much pastoral land leased under the 1869 Pastoral Leases Act was deserted, but some occupation continued in informal ways.

No "pre-emptive" rights provided for under previous acts were continued.

Grazing Homesteads were to be in 20,000 acres (8,100 ha; 81 km^{2}) blocks.

Specific selection types were introduced for land infested by prickly pear. A specific act, Prickly Pear Selection Act 1901 was introduced to deal with this form of selection.

Mortgages and transfers were restricted.

Leases were to be for 14, 21 or 28 years.

A ballot system was introduced to manage competition for land and land available for selection was to be published by a schedule.

== Land Act 1902 ==
The act dealt mainly with pastoral lease land which had been severely affected by the Federation drought. It was really a relief act to assist landholders affected by the drought.

Married women were given the right to hold a Grazing Homestead in their own right, after five years of the lease had elapsed.

Section 29 provided for ringbarking to be defined as an improvement.

Section 33 allowed a freeholder to select land adjacent to their property and not have to meet the residential requirement.

Under section 40 farmers could apply for an extension of a Grazing Farm lease if the land was not required for agricultural purposes.

Pastoral lessees were empowered to select Grazing Farms or Agricultural lease on their own pastoral leases.

== Closer Settlement Act 1906 ==
This act related to re-purchased estates or land opened for selection by groups. They were numerous across the state. The first legislation on the point was the Queensland Agricultural Lands Purchase Act 1894. The government purchased land from pastoral lessees and then opened the land for selection for family agricultural farms. Many of the estates came out of large successful pastoral holdings where the owner was prepared to sell in the 1890s depression. The land was approved by the Land Board (renamed Court). The Land Board reported to the Minister on the fair value of the land to the owner, demand for land in the neighborhood, suitability of the land, permanency of water, probability of selection and absence of sufficient crown land in the area.

== Land Act 1910 ==
This act was comprehensive and was a consolidation of previous land selection acts after obsolete provisions were repealed. The Minister recorded that it repealed 32 acts, 34 schedules and 734 clauses, including the New South Wales acts of 1836, 1854 and 1858 except for titling provisions. Pre-existing rights under the 1884 and 1897 acts were brought forward.

Agricultural Farms selected under earlier acts were brought under the 1910 act.

The maximum area for a selection was increased to 2,560 acres (1,040 ha; 10.4 km^{2}) and Agricultural Homesteads were to be a maximum of 320 acres (130 ha; 1.3 km^{2}). Prickly Pear selections were to be a maximum of 2,560 acres (1,040 ha; 10.4 km^{2}). Agricultural selections taken up by members of Groups were to be a maximum of 320 acres (130 ha; 1.3 km^{2}).

Time allocated for clearing of land and time to pay rents could be varied.

== See also ==
- Selection (Australian history)
