= Bundaberg West, Queensland =

Bundaberg West
- Suburb
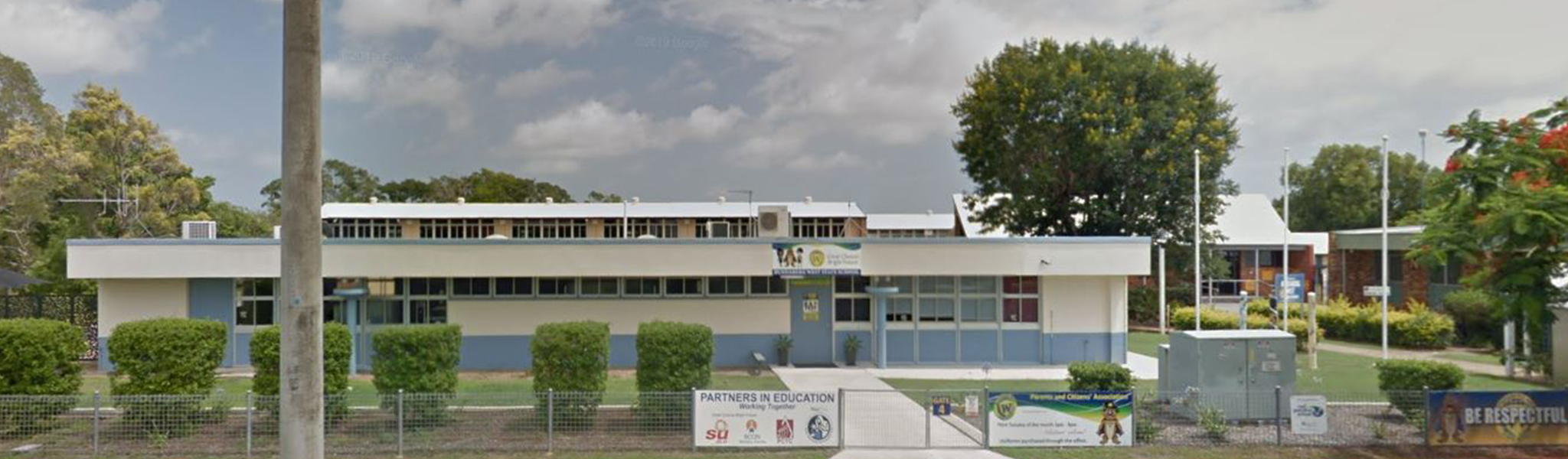
- Bundaberg West School, 2026

- Interactive map of Bundaberg West
- Coordinates: 24.8719°S 152.3386°E
- Country: Australia
- State: Queensland
- City: Bundaberg
- LGA: Bundaberg Region
- Location: 1.2 km (0.75 mi) W of Bundaberg CBD; 371 km (231 mi) N of Brisbane

Government
  - State electorate: Bundaberg
  - Federal division: Hinkler

Area
  - Total: 2.6 km^{2} (1.0 sq mi)

Population
  - Total: 2,596 (2021 census)
  - Density: 998/km^{2} (2,590/sq mi)
- Time zone: UTC+10:00 (AEST)
- Postcode: 4670
Suburbs around Bundaberg West
Bundaberg North	Bundaberg North	Bundaberg Central
Millbank	Bundaberg West	Bundaberg South
Svensson Heights	Norville	Walkerviale

Bundaberg West is a suburb of Bundaberg in the Bundaberg Region, Queensland, Australia. In the 2021 census, Bundaberg West had a population of 2,596 people.

== History ==
The Anglican Church of the Good Shepherd was dedicated in 1962 and consecrated in 1971.

Bundaberg West State School opened on 25 January 1926.

On 23 August 1936 St Patrick's Catholic Primary School was blessed and opened by Bishop of Rockhampton Romuald Denis Hayes. The school was in Harriet Street (which became Powers Street in 1940) and was a 50 x 50 feet wooden building with three classrooms. The school commenced teaching in January 1937 with less than 40 students and was operated by the Sisters of Mercy under the leadership of Sister Mary Liam.

In 1941 the Sisters of Mercy purchased the house Brabourne (originally owned by prominent citizen Frederick Buss) and established St Mary's Hostel, for women and girls working in or visiting Bundaberg. After World War II, doctors were calling for modern hospital facilities in Bundaberg, so the Sisters converted the hostel into the Mater Private Hospital, a 24-bed hospital with an operating theatre, chapel, and accommodation for the nurses and maids, officially opening on 28 July 1946. The nurses were initially all nuns, but they established a training school for other women to become nurses. The hospital expanded over the years with additional beds, operating theatres, X-ray, pathology and a dedicated children's ward. It was the first hospital in Queensland to use the Zeiss ophthalmic microscope, the first regional hospital in Queensland to have a lymphoedema clinic, and to use facial recognition technology for endoscopic sinus surgery.

== Demographics ==
In the 2011 census, Bundaberg West had a population of 2,529 people.

In the 2016 census, Bundaberg West had a population of 2,500 people.

In the 2021 census, Bundaberg West had a population of 2,596 people.

== Heritage listings ==
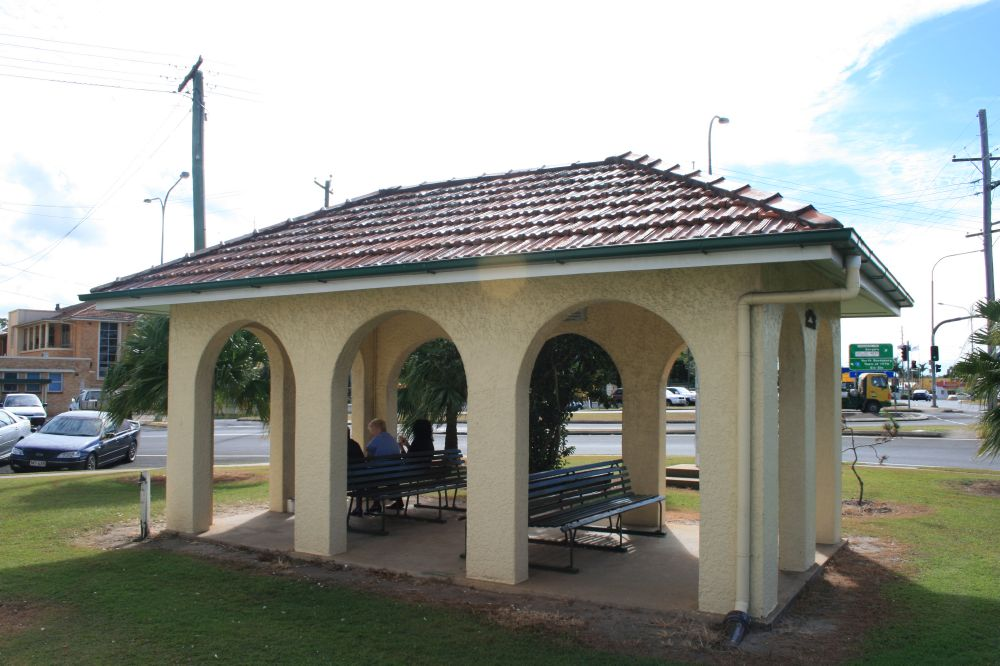
Bundaberg War Nurses Memorial, 2009

Bundaberg West has a number of heritage-listed sites, including:

- Bundaberg War Nurses Memorial, 276 Bourbong Street (24.8701°S 152.3359°E)
- Alexandra Park, 29 Quay Street: (24.8662°S 152.3412°E)

== Education ==
Bundaberg West State School is a government primary (Prep–6) school for boys and girls at 185B George Street (24.8762°S 152.3338°E). In 2018, the school had an enrolment of 243 students with 21 teachers and 19 non-teaching staff. It includes a special education program.

St Patrick's Catholic Primary School is a Catholic primary (Prep–6) school for boys and girls at 35 Mulgrave Street (24.8768°S 152.3401°E). In 2018, the school had an enrolment of 503 students with 30 teachers and 21 non-teaching staff.

There are no secondary schools in Bundaberg West. The nearest government secondary school is Bundaberg State High School in neighbouring Bundaberg South to the east.

== Amenities ==
The Anglican Church of the Good Shepherd is on George Street.

Bundaberg Base Hospital is a public hospital on Bourbong Street.

Mater Misericordiae Hospital Bundaberg is a private hospital on Bourbong Street.

Friendly Society Private Hospital is a private hospital on Binger Street.

Alexandra Park Zoo is on Quay Street.
