= Bundaberg South =

- Suburb
- Interactive map of Bundaberg South
- Coordinates: 24.8719°S 152.3594°E
- Country: Australia
- State: Queensland
- City: Bundaberg
- LGA: Bundaberg Region
- Location: 1.8 km (1.1 mi) SW of Bundaberg CBD; 368 km (229 mi) N of Brisbane

Government
  - State electorate: Bundaberg
  - Federal division: Hinkler

Area
  - Total: 2.2 km^{2} (0.85 sq mi)

Population
  - Total: 3,494 (2021 census)
  - Density: 1,590/km^{2} (4,110/sq mi)
- Time zone: UTC+10:00 (AEST)
- Postcode: 4670
Suburbs around Bundaberg South
Bundaberg Central	Bundaberg East	Bundaberg East
Bundaberg West	Bundaberg South	Kepnock
Norville	Walkervale	Walkervale

Bundaberg South is a suburb of Bundaberg in the Bundaberg Region, Queensland, Australia. In the 2021 census, Bundaberg South had a population of 3,494 people.

== History ==
The first Bundaberg South State School opened on 6 February 1875 in Bourbong Street. On 30 June 1885, it split into two schools: Bundaberg South Boys State School and Bundaberg South Girls and Infants State School. In 1890s these two schools relocated to Crofton Street. Circa November 1894 both of these schools were renamed to be Bundaberg Central Boys State School and Bundaberg Central Girls and Infants State School. In 1926 the two schools were combined to create Bundaberg Central State School, which is now located in Bundaberg Central.

On 11 May 1891, the South-East Bundaberg State School opened under head teacher William Ernest Benbow. In 1894, the school was renamed Bundaberg South State School (as the earlier schools with that name had been renamed to Bundaberg Central).

St Mary's Mission Hall (Anglican Church) was dedicated in 26 March 1895. It closed during the year ended 31 December 1989.

Bundaberg State High School opened on 22 January 1912. In 1964 it was renamed Bundaberg State High School and Technical College. In 1965 the technical college was separated from the school and the school's name restored to Bundaberg State High School.

== Demographics ==
In the 2011 census, Bundaberg South had a population of 3,424 people.

In the 2016 census, Bundaberg South had a population of 3,307 people.

In the 2021 census, Bundaberg South had a population of 3,494 people.

== Heritage listings ==
Bundaberg South has a number of heritage-listed sites, including:

- St John's Lutheran Church, 30 George Street
- Bundaberg State High School, 37 Maryborough Street

== Education ==
Bundaberg South State School is a government primary (Prep–6) school for boys and girls at 32 Walla Street (24.8710°S 152.3606°E). In 2018, the school had an enrolment of 185 students with 15 teachers (11 full-time equivalent) and 13 non-teaching staff (8 full-time equivalent).

Bundaberg State High School is a government secondary (7–12) school for boys and girls at 37 Maryborough Street (24.8770°S 152.3498°E). In 2018, the school had an enrolment of 1,406 students with 117 teachers (111 full-time equivalent) and 68 non-teaching staff (53 full-time equivalent). It includes a special education program.
