= Bundaberg =

- City
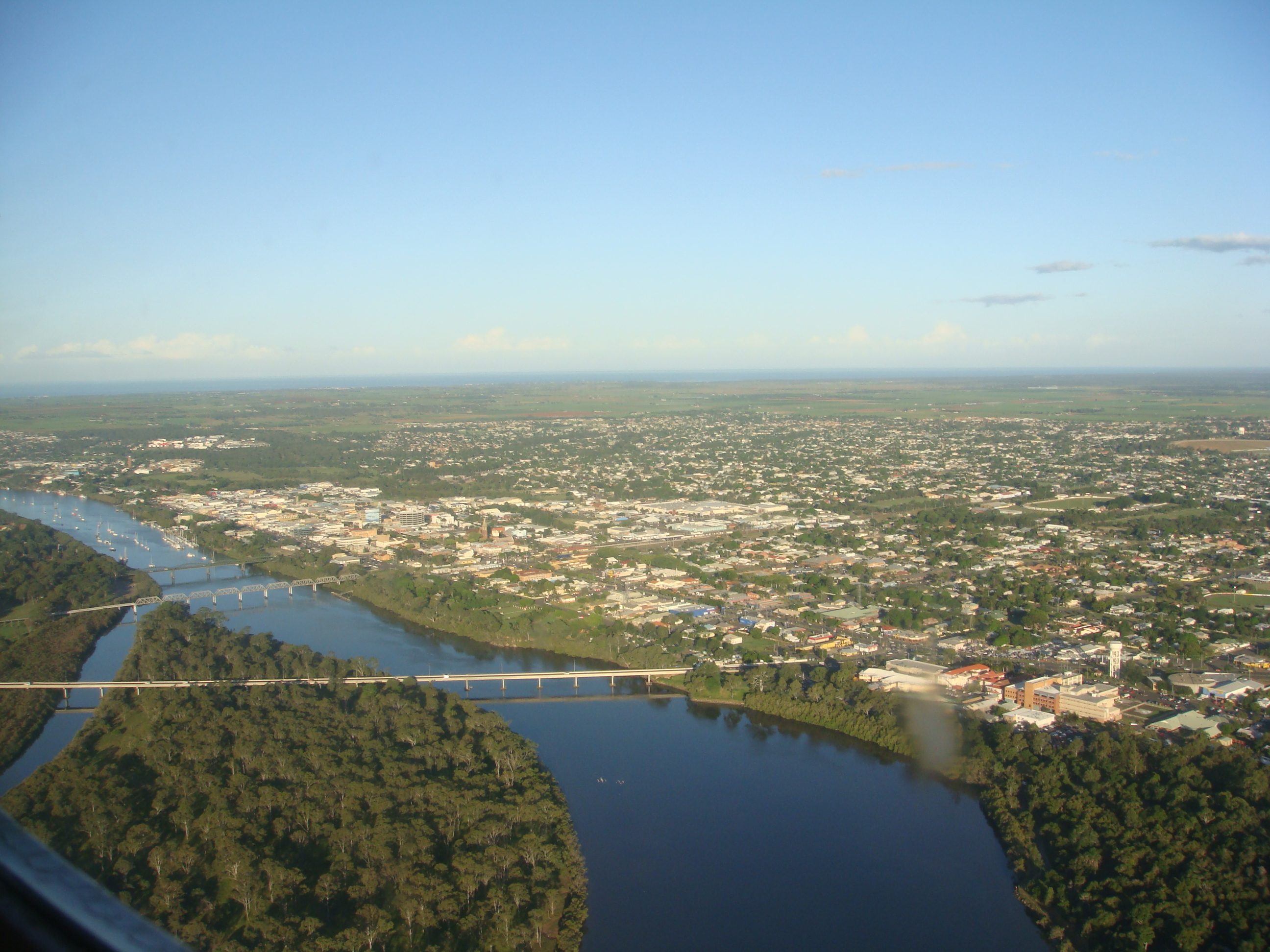
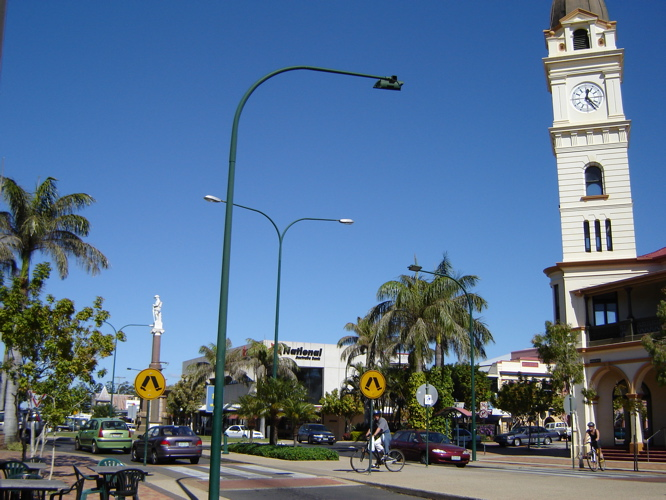
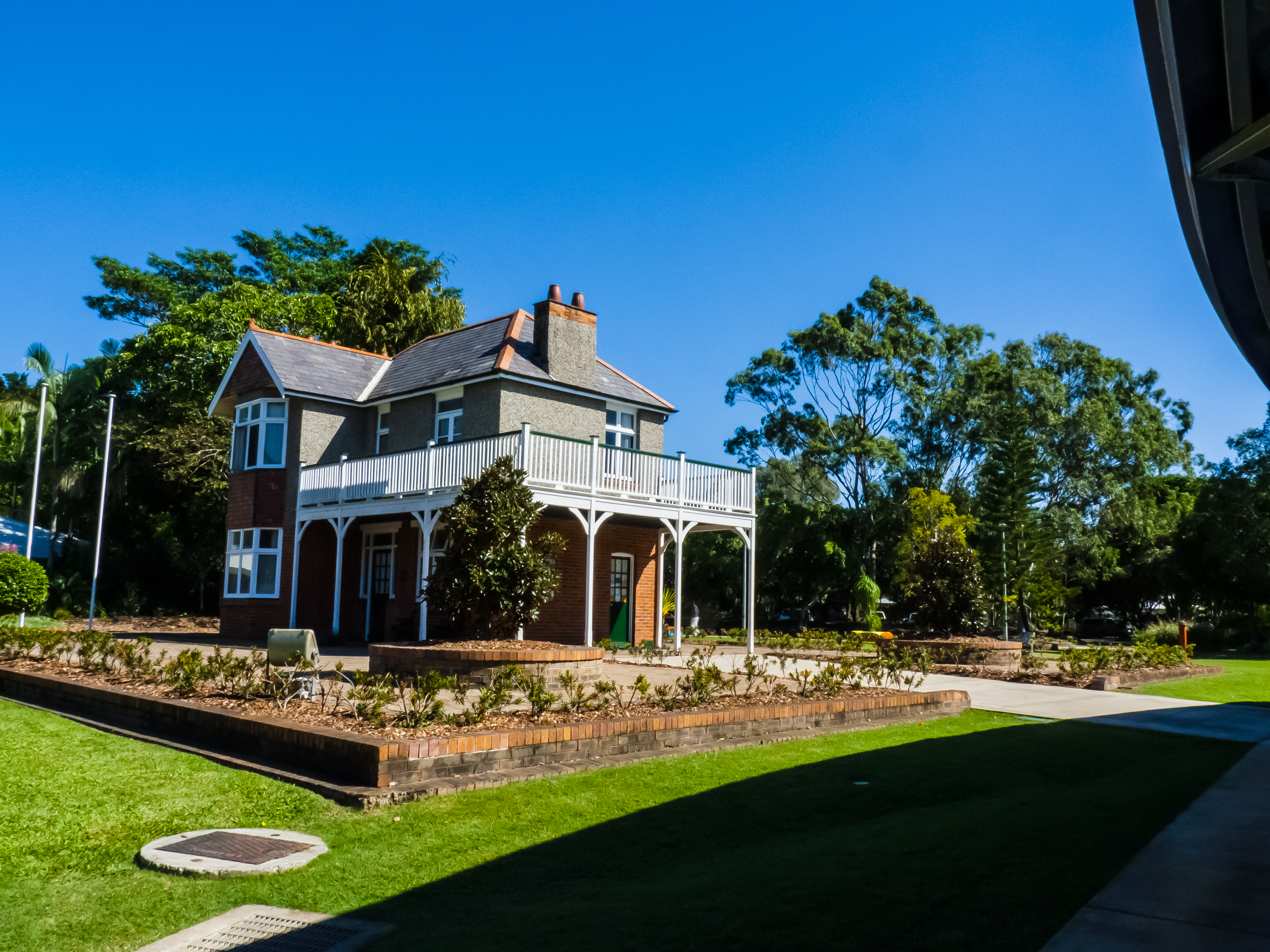
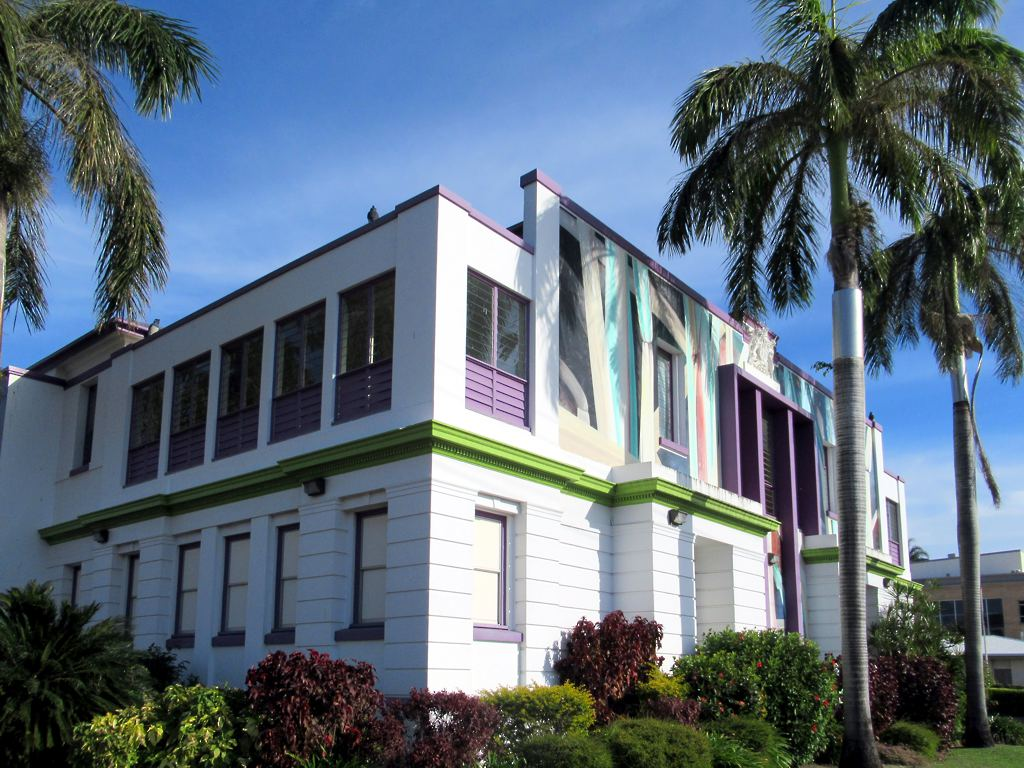
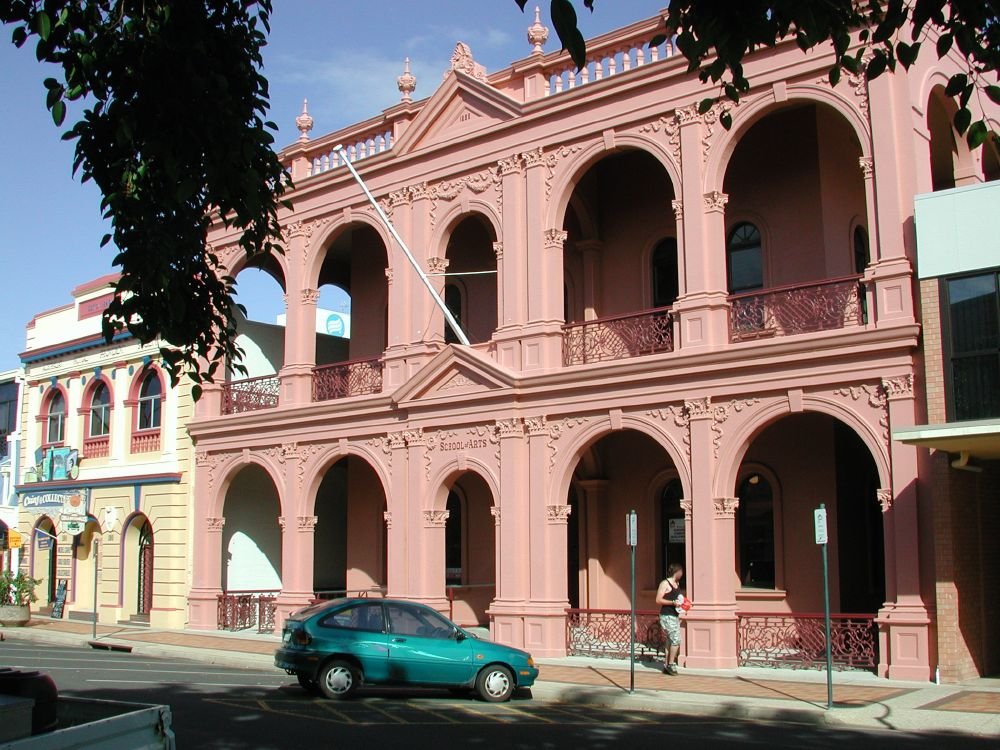
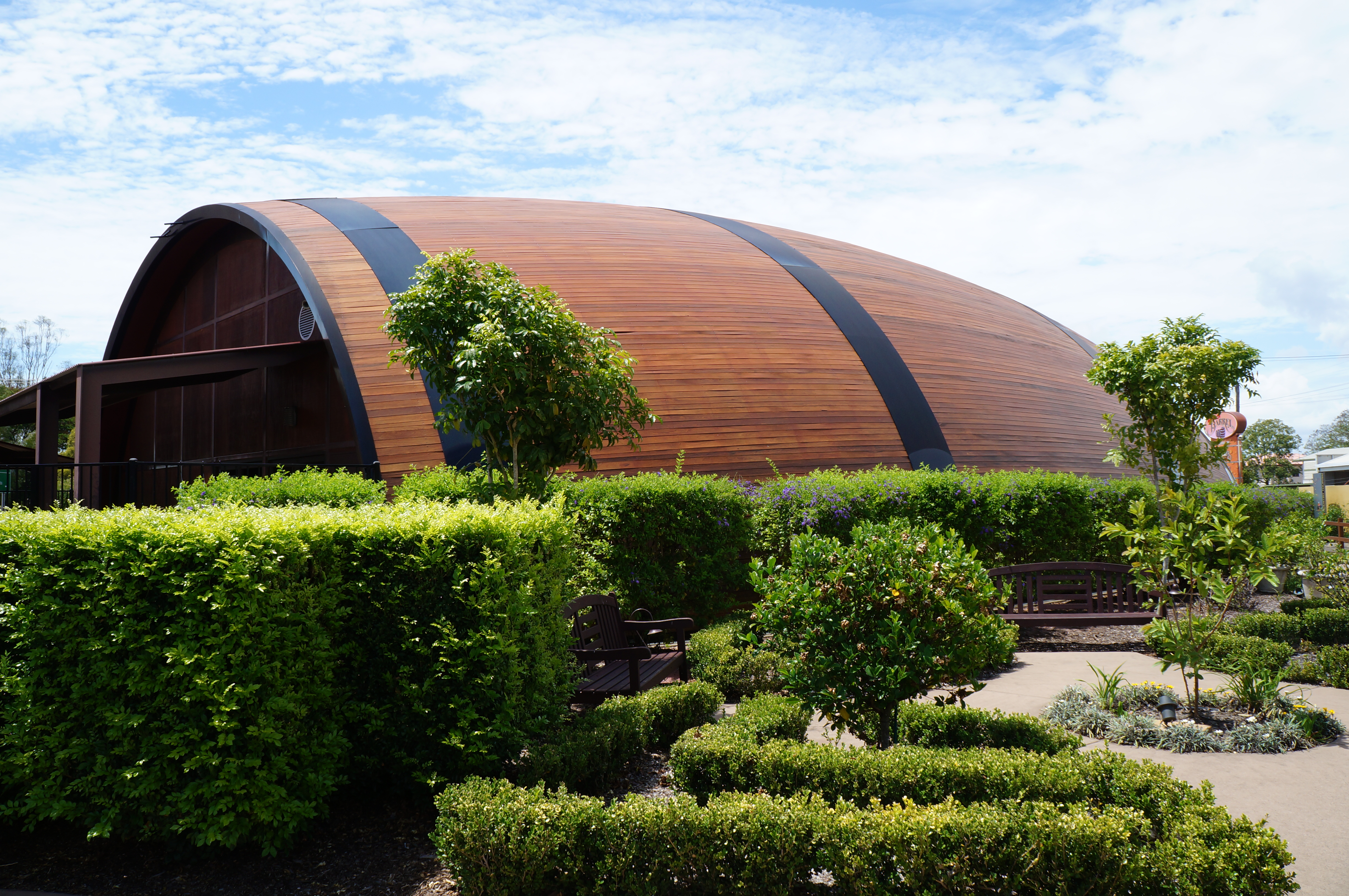
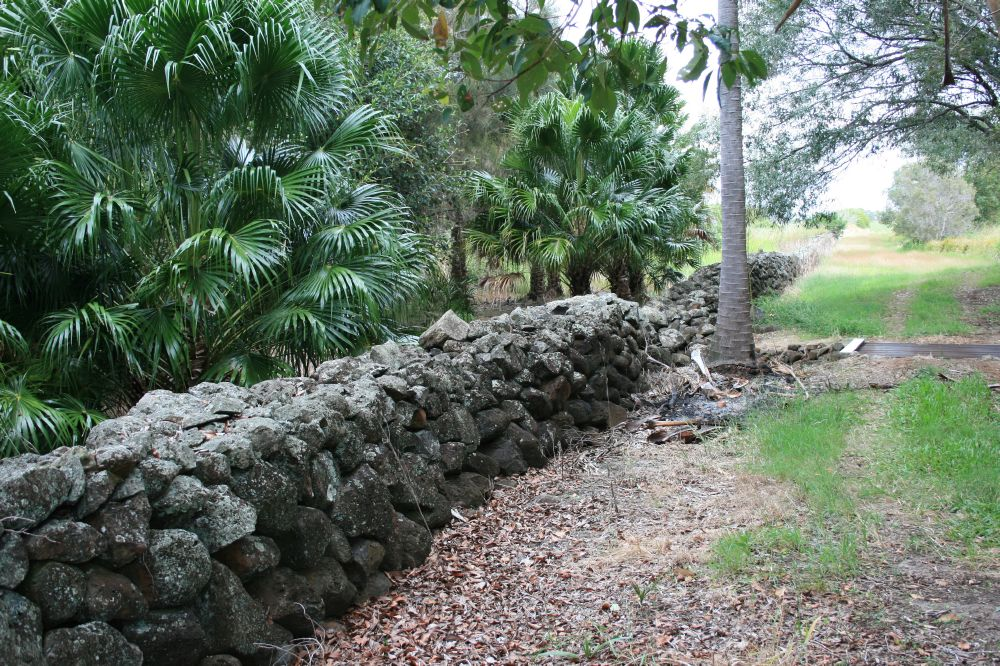
- (From left to right); Aerial view of Bundaberg and the Burnett River, Bundaberg Post Office and Bundaberg War Memorial, Hinkler House in the Bundaberg Botanic Gardens, Bundaberg Regional Art Gallery, Historic architecture along Bourbong street, Bundaberg Rum Distillery, South Sea Islander wall

- Coordinates: 24.8661°S 152.3494°E
- Country: Australia
- State: Queensland
- LGA: Bundaberg Region
- Location: 112 km (70 mi) NNW of Maryborough; 186 km (116 mi) SE of Gladstone; 287 km (178 mi) SE of Rockhampton; 366 km (227 mi) N of Brisbane
- Established: 1870

Government
  - State electorates: Bundaberg; Burnett
  - Federal division: Hinkler
- Elevation: 15 m (49 ft)

Population
  - Total: 73,747 (Significant Urban Area) (2021 census) (25th)
- Time zone: UTC+10:00 (AEST)
- Postcode: 4670
- County: Cook
- Mean max temp: 26.5 °C (79.7 °F)
- Mean min temp: 16.3 °C (61.3 °F)
- Annual rainfall: 1,142.6 mm (44.98 in)

Bundaberg (/ˈbʌndəbɜːrɡ/ BUN-də-BERG) is the major regional city in the Wide Bay-Burnett region of the state of Queensland, Australia. It is the ninth largest city in the state. The Bundaberg central business district is situated along the southern bank of the Burnett River about 20 km (12 mi) from its mouth at Burnett Heads, where it flows into the Coral Sea. The city is sited on a rich coastal plain, supporting one of the nation's most productive agricultural regions. The area of Bundaberg is the home of the Taribelang-Bunda, Goreng Goreng, Gurang, and Bailai peoples. The common nickname for Bundaberg is "Bundy", although its history as a major sugar producing region means it is often referenced as the "Rum City" or "Sugar City". In the 2021 census, the Bundaberg urban area had a population of 73,747 people.

The district surveyor, John Thompson Charlton designed the city layout in 1868, which planned for uniform square blocks with wide main streets, and named it ‘Bundaberg’. An early influence on the development of Bundaberg came with the 1868 Land Act, which was a famous Queensland via media, that aimed to create a class of Australian yeoman. Large sugarcane plantations were established throughout the 1880s, with industries of sugar mills, refineries, and rum distilleries that delivered prosperity to Bundaberg. These plantations used South Sea Islanders as indentured labourers, many of whom were blackbirded, a practice considered a form of slavery. The trade was outlawed in 1904, with most South Sea Islanders deported by 1906. Major floods in 1942 and 1954 damaged the river, ending Bundaberg's role as a river port and led to a new port at the mouth of the Burnett river. In the post-war era, Bundaberg continued to grow with its wealth tied to its sugar industry. In 2013, Bundaberg experienced record flooding from Cyclone Oswald, which was the worst disaster in the city's history.

The economy of Bundaberg is based primarily on agriculture, forestry, fishing and tourism, with a gross regional product at about $5.62 billion as of June 2023. Bundaberg also has a major distillery and brewery industry that exports to international markets. The city is served by the Port of Bundaberg and the Bundaberg Airport.

Bundaberg has a rich history and culture, along with its humid subtropical climate it is known for its weeping fig trees, dry stone walls, and historic plantations, including the Fairymead Plantation and the Sunnyside Sugar Plantation, the latter of which is the site of a mass grave. Other sites of South Sea Islander cultural significance include Sir Anthony's Rest atop the Bundaberg Hummock and the South Sea Islander Church. Major cultural institutions include the Hinkler Hall of Aviation and the Bundaberg Regional Art Gallery. The city's culinary culture is highlighted by its annual 'Banquet on the Bridge', and an iconic rum and gin culture with Bundaberg Rum originating in the city.

Bundaberg is a popular tourism destination, the city's hinterland includes the historic towns of Childers and Gin Gin, Lake Monduran, Cania Gorge National Park and the Promisedland mountain bike trails. Bundaberg's coastal areas include Bargara and Mon Repos, Deepwater National Park, and the southernmost reaches of the Great Barrier Reef alongside the islands of Lady Musgrave and Lady Elliot.

== Geography ==
The city is about 385 kilometres (239 mi) north of the state capital, Brisbane. It is 15 kilometres (9.3 mi) inland from the Coral Sea coast and situated on the Burnett River.

== Etymology ==
=== City name ===
The name was coined by surveyor John Charlton Thompson and his assistant Alfred Dale Edwards. Bunda was derived from the name of one of the kinship groups of the local Taribelang people, and appended with the suffix "berg". Two sources of the suffix have been proposed. It is a Saxon suffix which means "hill". It is also a German word which translates as "mountain", and refers to the Sloping Hummoch, the singular hill rising above the relatively flat region surrounding the Burnett River on which the city is situated.

=== Bourbong Street ===
Bourbong Street is the main street of the city. and there is some controversy in regards to its spelling and meaning. Bourbong was alternatively spelled Bourbon or Boorbong, which was a local Aboriginal title given to a large waterhole in the area. The main street was historically also gazetted in the Bundaberg Mail as "Bourbon" street, but by 1941 there is no reference to "Bourbon" street. Robert Strathdee's farming selection in the vicinity of the watering holes was recorded on early survey maps as 'Boorbung'.

A pioneer pastoralist of the region, Nicholas Tooth, wrote that "Bourbong" was derived from the local Aboriginal phrase "bier rabong", meaning "plenty dead". Tooth, who took up land in the area in the early 1860s, found that Aboriginal people resolutely avoided the "bier rabong" vicinity. He later found the skeletal remains there of around twenty Aboriginal people who were apparently massacred in a raid by the Native Police.

== History ==
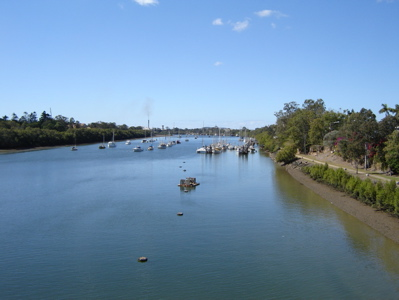
Burnett River

=== Early history ===
The Traditional owner Aboriginal groups in the region are the Taribelang, Gooreng Gooreng, Gurang, and Bailai peoples. They are the original inhabitants of the region. A determination of Native Title was made for all four cultural groups by the National Native Title Tribunal, pursuant to the Native Title Act 1993, on 28 November 2017. It was determined that "native title exists in the entire determination area" of Bundaberg, Gladstone, and the North Burnett.

As such, the Bundaberg Regional Council has reflected this recognition in their "First Nations Strategy 2022-2026", and endeavours to celebrate and embrace the region's "local connections to First Nation Peoples and other cultures".

=== Initial British colonisation ===
The first British man to visit the area was James Davis in the 1830s. He was an escaped convict from the Moreton Bay Penal settlement who lived with the Kabi people to the south of the region. He resided mostly around the Mary River and was referred to as Durrumboi. The Burnett River was surveyed by John Charles Burnett, after whom it was named during his exploration mission of the Wide Bay and Burnett regions in 1847.

British occupation of the land in the region began in 1848 when pastoral squatters Gregory Blaxland Jr. (1817-1850) son of Gregory Blaxland, and William Forster established a sheep station. Blaxland was a son of the Blue Mountains explorer, Gregory Blaxland, and Forster was later to become a Premier of New South Wales. They selected a very large area of land which encompassed most of the western part of the modern day Bundaberg Region along the Burnett River. They named this pastoral lease Tirroan.

Blaxland and Forster had previously set up sheep stations near the Clarence River and had a notable history of conflict with Aboriginal people. Sheep stations imposed on native bushland disrupt native food production, typically resulting in widespread hunger and illness amongst native peoples. Conflict continued at Tirroan when two of their shepherds were killed by Aboriginal people in 1849. Forster and Blaxland led a punitive expedition causing multiple Aboriginal deaths. Further conflict occurred in 1850 when Blaxland was clubbed to death by Aboriginal peoples. Forster and a number of other squatters conducted another reprisal, resulting in a large massacre of Aboriginal people in scrubland toward the coastal part of Tirroan.

In the early 1850s, Forster sold the property to Alfred Henry Brown who changed the name of the pastoral lease to Gin Gin. At the same time, Native Police officer, Richard Purvis Marshall, took up the Bingera leasehold in the rainforest scrubland downstream from Tirroan. Three towns in the Bundaberg region, Tirroan, South Bingera and Gin Gin, commemorate these massive initial leaseholds.

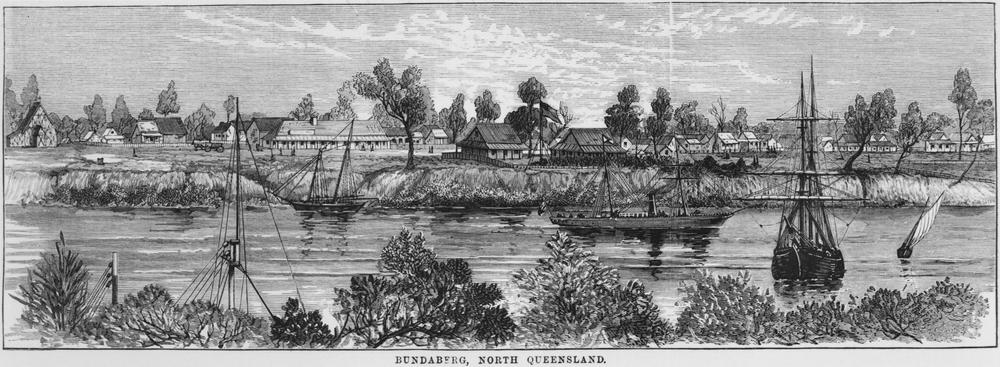
Sketch of Bundaberg, North Queensland, 1877 (State Library of Queensland)

=== Cattle and logging ===
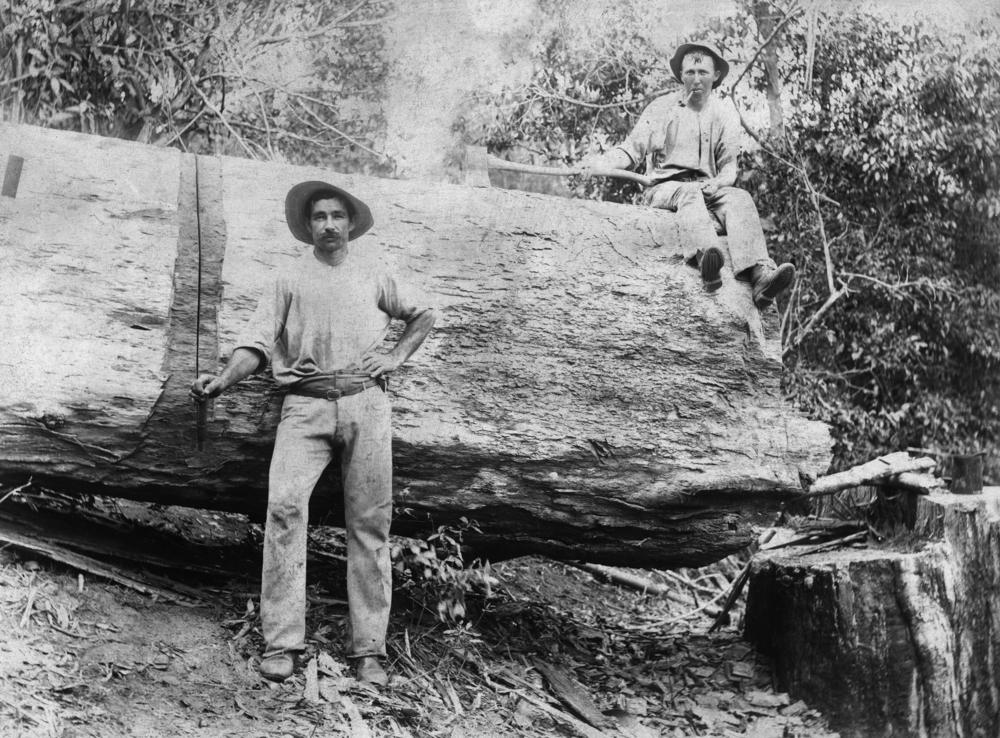
Timber workers

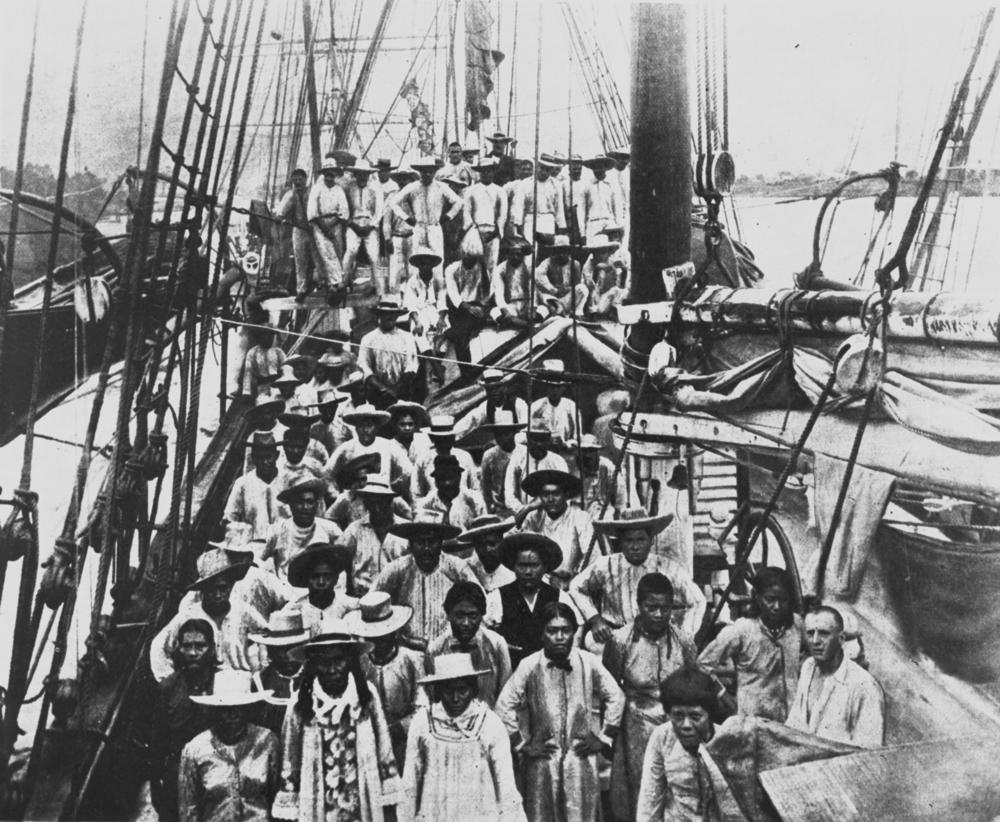
South Sea Islanders on the deck of a ship arriving in Bundaberg, 1895

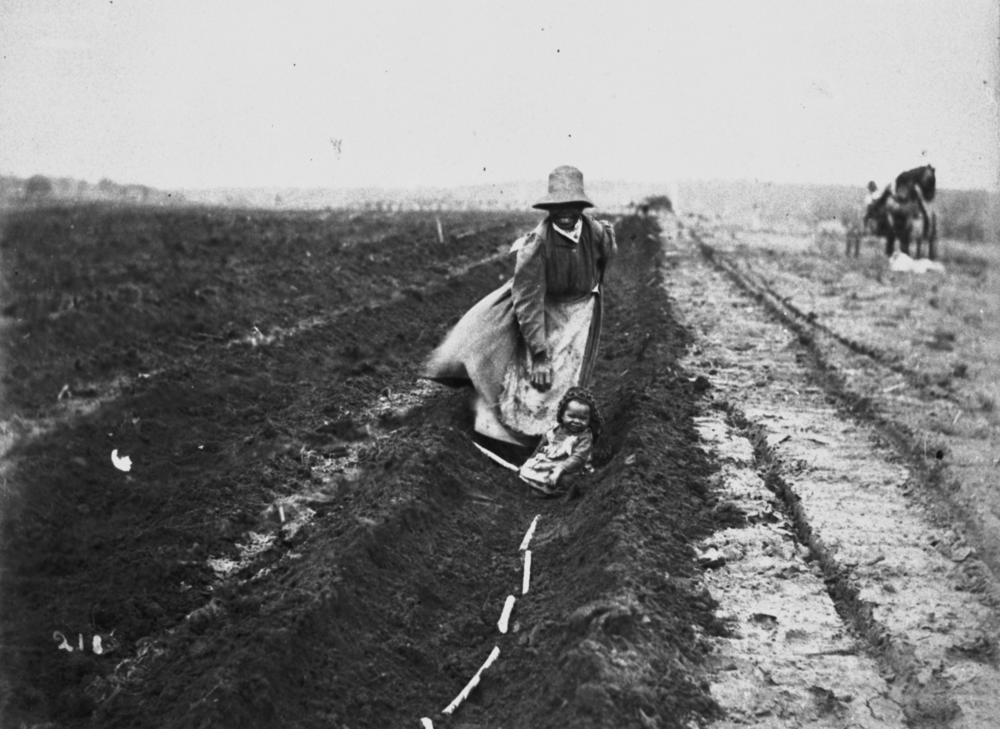
South Sea Islander woman planting sugar cane in a field, c.1897

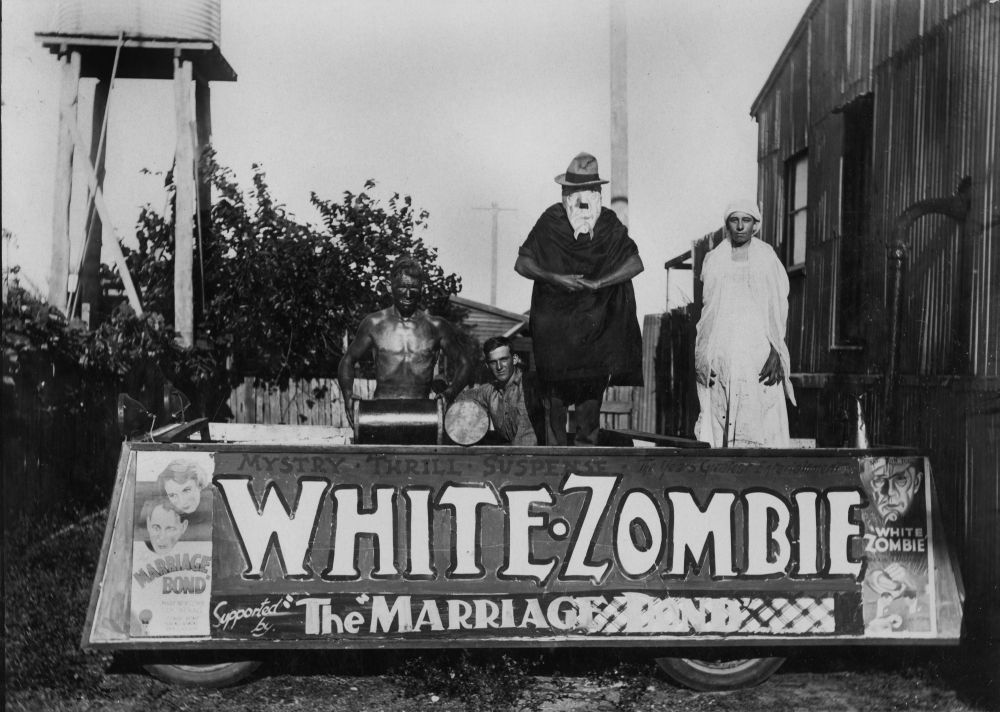
Promotional float for Paramount Theatre for White Zombie with actors in blackface, Bundaberg ca. 1930s.

Before colonisation, much of the land around the lower reaches of the Burnett River consisted of either the Woongarra Scrub, a subtropical rainforest that stood where most of the Bundaberg canefields now grow, or the Barolin Plains, a lightly timbered grassland that stretched along the coastal fringe. Neither of these areas were suitable for sheep farming but the British soon found that raising cattle was possible. In the early 1860s the first cattle stations in the area were established; Branyan on the south side of the Burnett River and Tantitha on the north side.

Timber companies, such as that owned by William Pettigrew, started the logging of the Woongarra Scrub in 1867. In 1868, Samuel Johnston erected a sawmill in Waterview, on the north bank of the Burnett River. The Waterview sawmill became a prominent supplier of timber until its closure in 1903 after being damaged by flood.

=== Town of Bundaberg ===
In 1867, timber-getters and farmers, John and Gavin Steuart, established the Woondooma property which consisted of a few houses and a wharf on the northern banks of the Burnett River where Bundaberg North now stands. An official survey of the area was undertaken in 1869 by John Charlton Thompson, assisted by James Ellwood and Alfred Dale Edwards, and the town of Bundaberg was gazetted across the river on the higher, southern banks. The first Bundaberg land sale was held in Maryborough on 11 May 1870 where hotelier John Foley bought the original lots.

=== Sugar ===
Most of the early settlers exploited the timber and grew maize on their selections but as a result of the incentives of the Sugar and Coffee Regulations of 1864, sugar became a major component in Bundaberg's development from the 1870s. Experimental sugar cane cultivation in the district was first grown at John Charlton Thompson's Rubyanna property in 1870 and the first sugar mill was built by Richard Elliot Palmer at his Millbank plantation in 1872. Bundaberg rapidly became an important sugar production region after the construction of the Millaquin Sugar Refinery at East Bundaberg by Robert Cran and his sons in 1882. The Fairymead sugar processing plant owned by the Young Brothers (Arthur, Horace and Ernest Young) opened in 1884 which further augmented Bundaberg's sugar producing capacity.

The initial 35 years of the sugar industry in Bundaberg was reliant on South Sea Islander workers, who were often blackbirded and kept in a status close to slavery. The first significant shipload of Kanaka labour, as it was called, to arrive on the Burnett River came in January 1872 aboard the Petrel. Allegations of kidnapping and wounding immediately arose concerning the recruitment of the Islanders on this vessel. Influential Bundaberg plantation owners were able to purchase recruiting ships in order to obtain labour directly from areas such as the Solomon Islands and the New Hebrides. The Young Brothers owned the Lochiel and the May vessels, the Cran family and Frederic Buss were the major investors in the Helena while the Ariel was co-owned by a number of local planters. While some of the recruitment was voluntary, violence and deception toward Islanders often took place. For example, the crew of the Helena fought a battle with the locals of Ambrym while taking Islanders from there.

These labourers had to work for three years and were only paid at the end of this time period. Instead of cash, they usually received substandard goods and trinkets of minimal value as payment. Excessive mortality of the Islanders while serving their term of labour in the Bundaberg region was frequent. Overwork, poor housing, inadequate food, contaminated water supplies and a lack of medical care all contributed to the high death rate. Penalties for the plantation owners whose neglect resulted in these fatalities were rare and did not exceed a £10 fine. Importing South Sea Islander labour was made illegal in 1904 and enforced repatriation of these workers out of Bundaberg and other locations in Queensland occurred from 1906 to 1908.

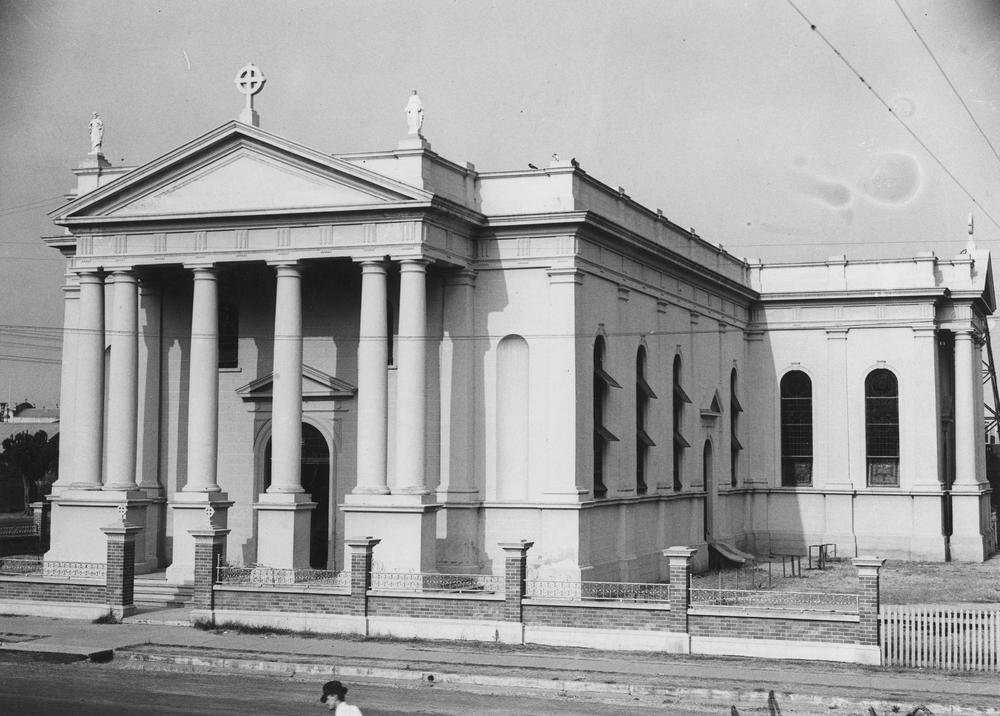
Holy Rosary Catholic Church, Bundaberg, 1939

The 1911 Queensland sugar strike occurred after the phasing out of South Sea Islander labour, with workers claiming that many plantation owners had substituted black indentured labourers (sometimes referred to as slaves) with white ones. Workers sought better accommodation, wages and conditions, including an eight-hour day and a minimum weekly wage of 30 shillings, including food. The mobilisation of unionists from Bundaberg to Mossman was a major achievement, with the 1911 strike lasting over seven weeks in Bundaberg where the town's economy was largely based on the sugar industry. The end result of the strike was a Commonwealth Royal Commission into the sugar industry in 1911–12, which had been initially requested by Harry Hall, a Bundaberg AWA organiser in 1908 with a petition signed by 1500 Bundaberg sugar workers. The Royal Commission, with ALF Secretary Albert Hinchcliffe as secretary, concluded the AWA demands had been justified. The union victory was a watershed in organised labour in Queensland and Australia.

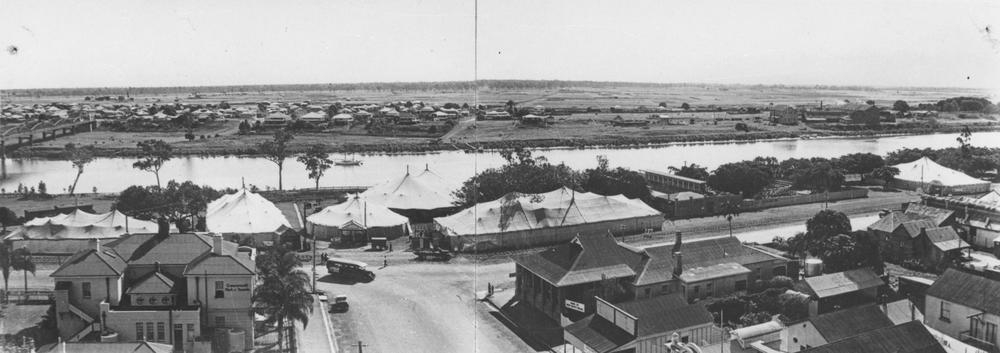
Vaudeville marquees on Quay Street on the banks of the Burnett River, 1935

=== Further progress ===
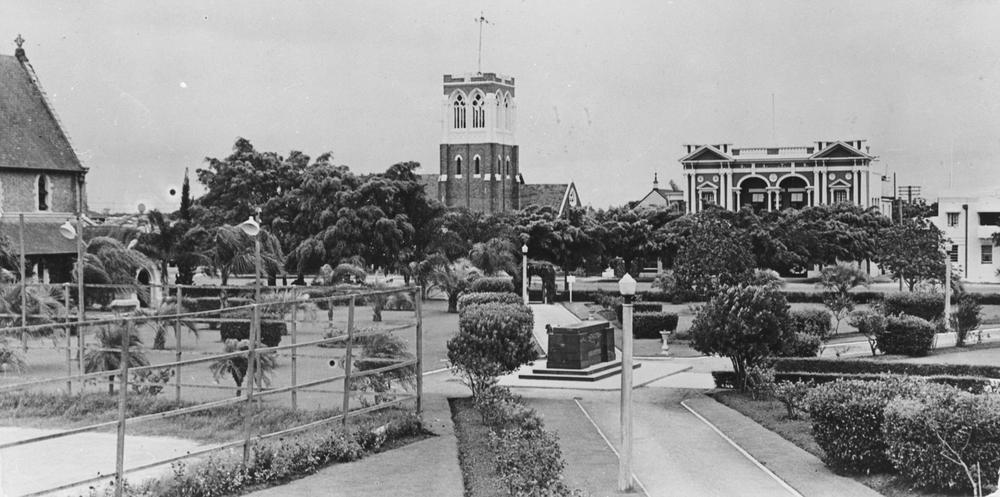
Buss Park vista, the Church of England to the left, and the Presbyterian Church and the Ambulance Building in the background, 1946

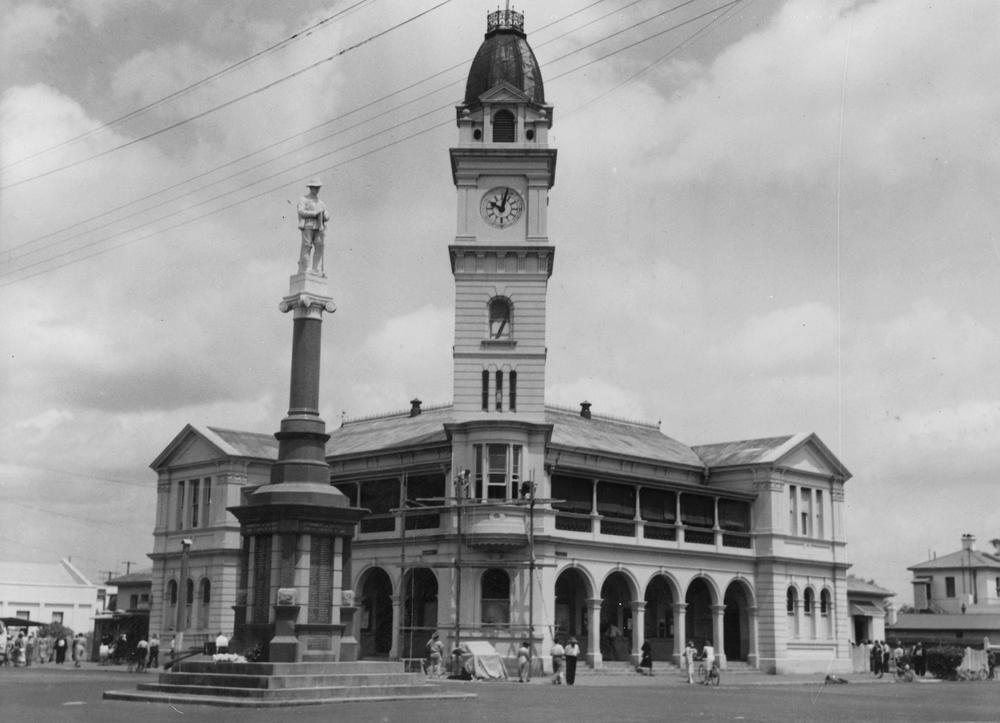
Bundaberg War Memorial in front of the Bundaberg Post Office, 1948

St Joseph's School opened in June 1876.

With the passage of the Local Authorities Act 1902, Barolin Division became the Shire of Barolin and the Borough of Bundaberg became the Town of Bundaberg on 31 March 1903. On 22 November 1913, Bundaberg was proclaimed a City.

In 1912 Bundaberg pioneering aviator Bert Hinkler built and successfully flew his own glider on Mon Repos beach. He also completed a noteworthy non-stop flight from London to Turin in 1920. The following year in 1921 Hinkler flew from Sydney to Bundaberg, non-stop, in a record breaking flight of 8 and a half hours, in the process beating a telegram he had sent to his mother, to warn her of his arrival.

The Bundaberg War Memorial commemorating those who died in the Anglo-Boer War and World War I was unveiled by Major-General Charles Brand on 30 July 1921. The Bundaberg digger was imported from Italy and is constructed of Italian marble. The completed memorial, at a cost of £1,650, was the third most costly to be erected in Queensland. It is a major regional memorial and one of the two most intact digger memorials that remain in their original settings of intersections.

The Bundaberg tragedy of 1928 resulted in the deaths of 12 children in a 24-hour period after they were administered a contaminated diphtheria vaccine.

In 1941 the Sisters of Mercy purchased the house Brabourne (originally owned by prominent citizen Frederick Buss) and established St Mary's Hostel, for women and girls working in or visiting Bundaberg. After World War II, doctors were calling for modern hospital facilities in Bundaberg, so the Sisters converted the hostel into the Mater Private Hospital, a 24-bed hospital with an operating theatre, chapel, and accommodation for the nurses and maids, officially opening on 28 July 1946. The nurses were initially all nuns, but they established a training school for other women to become nurses. The hospital expanded over the years with additional beds, operating theatres, X-ray, pathology and a dedicated children's ward. It was the first hospital in Queensland to use the Zeiss ophthalmic microscope, the first regional hospital in Queensland to have a lymphoedema clinic, and to use facial recognition technology for endoscopic sinus surgery.

In the 1960s the township was completely flooded by the Burnett river. In 1967 Bundaberg celebrated its centenary by producing a coin and opening The Bundaberg and District Historical Museum in the Bundaberg Botanical Gardens in Bundaberg North.

=== Bundaberg in the 21st century ===
In December 2010, Bundaberg suffered its worst floods in 60 years, when floodwaters from the Burnett River inundated hundreds of homes.

Two years later, in January 2013, Bundaberg experienced its worst flooding in recorded history as a result of Cyclone Oswald. Floodwaters from the Burnett River peaked at 9.53 metres. Over 4,000 properties and 600 businesses had been affected by floodwaters, which moved in excess of 70 kilometres per hour (43 mph). Two defence force Blackhawk helicopters were brought in from Townsville as part of the evacuation operation, which ultimately used an additional 14 aircraft.

In March 2026, Bundaberg again experienced major flooding, with the Burnett River expected to peak on Tuesday evening, or Wednesday morning 11 March. Tropical Low 29U crossed the coast in North Queensland on 5 March, before dragging the monsoon trough southwards as the low progressed to the West, bringing rain to much of Queensland. The low then progressed to the coast along the trough, with the rain ending on Monday evening following four days of rain. Riverine flooding began on Tuesday morning as floodwaters from upstream accumulated in the tidal plains of the Burnett River near Bundaberg. The Burnett River's depth rose to over 7 metres (23 ft), with more than 200 residents required to leave. Areas in town were flooded including McDonalds, Bundaberg Motor Group, Mitre 10, and Dan Murphy's.

On 6 April 2018, Prince Charles visited Bundaberg Rum Distillery. He stated, "I'm thrilled that this Distillery's proving to be the one that produces some of the most famous and special of all rums around the world."

In 2018, the Australian Bureau of Statistics estimated the population of Bundaberg's significant urban area was 70,921 people.

== Demographics ==
In the 2016 census, the city of Bundaberg had a population of 50,148 people.

In the 2016 Census, there were 69,069 people in Bundaberg (Significant Urban Area). Aboriginal and Torres Strait Islander people made up 4.3% of the population. 81.2% of people were born in Australia. The next most common countries of birth were England 3.2%, New Zealand 1.8%, Philippines 0.7%, South Africa 0.5% and Scotland 0.4%. 88.9% of people spoke only English at home. Other languages spoken at home included Mandarin 0.5%, Italian 0.4%, German 0.3%, Afrikaans 0.2% and Tagalog 0.2%. The most common responses for religion were No Religion 26.3%, Catholic 18.7% and Anglican 18.6%.

In the 2021 census, Bundaberg's urban area has a population of 73,747 people.

== Heritage listings ==
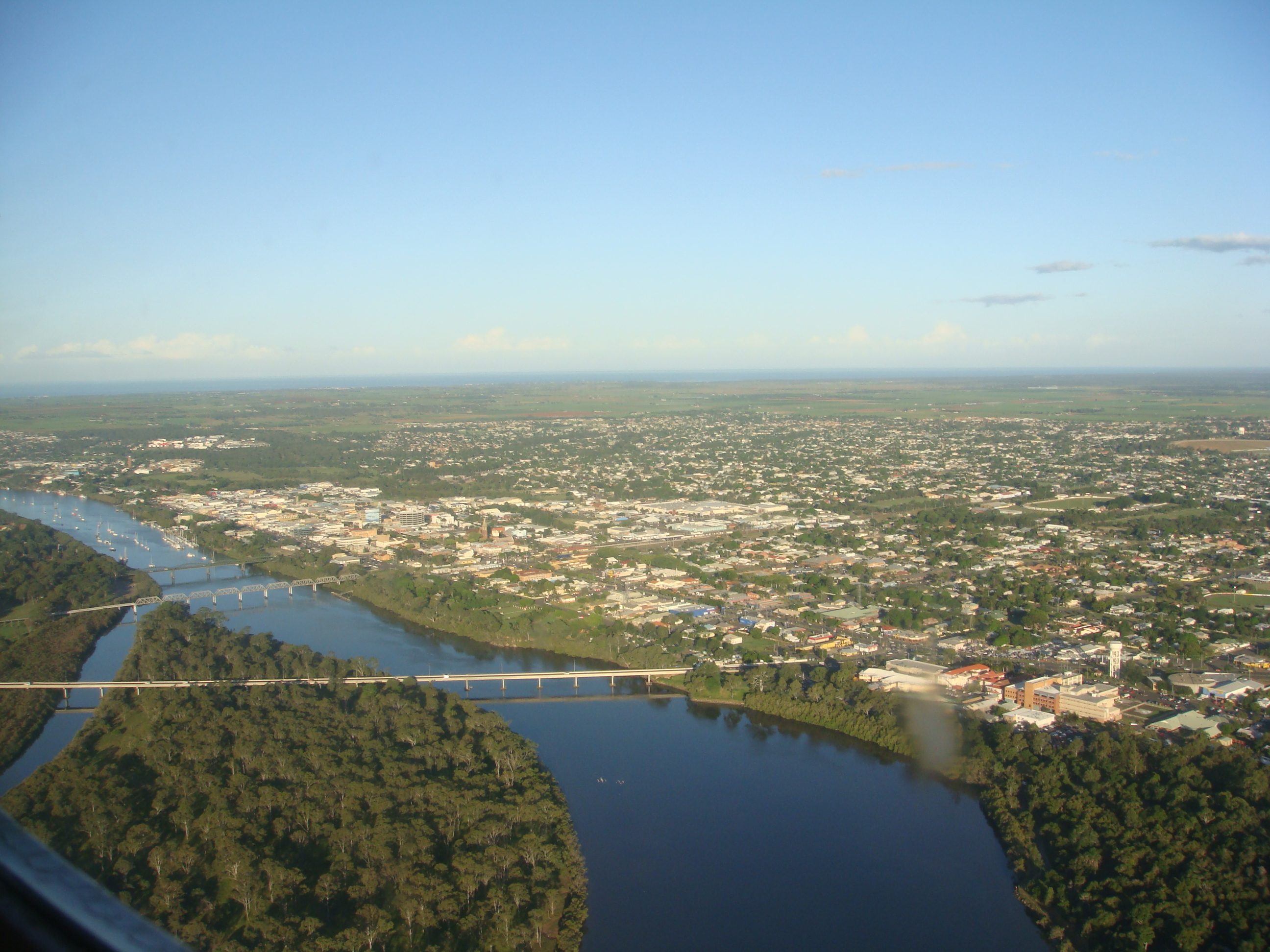
Aerial view from the west

Bundaberg has a number of heritage-listed sites, including:

- Corner of Bargara Road and Zeilke Avenue, Kalkie: Kalkie State School
- Bourbong Street, Bundaberg Central: Bourbong Street Weeping Figs
- Bourbong Street, Bundaberg Central: Bundaberg War Memorial
- Bourbong Street, West Bundaberg: Bundaberg War Nurses Memorial
- Bourbong Street between Bundaberg Central and Bundaberg East: Kennedy Bridge
- 155a Bourbong Street: Bundaberg Post Office
- 184 Bourbong Street, Bundaberg Central: Bundaberg School of Arts
- 191–193 Bourbong Street, Bundaberg Central: Commercial Bank
- 13 Crofton Street: Bundaberg Central State School
- 30 George Street, South Bundaberg: St John's Lutheran Church
- 46 Johnston Street, Millbank: South Sea Islander Church
- 1 Maryborough Street, Bundaberg Central: Fallon House
- corner of Maryborough and Woongarra Streets, Bundaberg Central: St Andrews Uniting Church
- Quay Street, Bundaberg Central: Bundaberg Police Station
- Quay Street, Bundaberg Central, to Perry Street, Bundaberg North: Burnett Bridge
- Quay Street, from Bundaberg Central to Bundaberg East: Saltwater Creek Railway Bridge
- Sir Anthony's Rest Street, Qunaba: Sir Anthony's Rest
- 17 Sussex Street, East Bundaberg: East Bundaberg Water Tower
- Thornhill Street, Bundaberg North: Fairymead House
- 55 Woongarra Street: 4BU Radio Station
- Cnr Woongarra and Maryborough streets, Bundaberg Central: Christ Church, Bundaberg The church sits adjacent to Buss Park which contains a memorial to Bert Hinkler.

== Climate ==
Bundaberg has a warm humid subtropical climate (Köppen: Cfa) with hot, wet summers and very mild, dry winters. Mean maximum temperatures are high for most of the year, from 22.3 °C (72.1 °F) in July to 30.4 °C (86.7 °F) in January. Annual rainfall averages around 997.0 millimetres (39.25 in), with a strong summer maximum and winter minimum. Extreme temperatures ranged from −0.7 °C (30.7 °F) on 16 July 1918 to 40.2 °C (104.4 °F) on 19 December 1901.

Climate data for Bundaberg (24º54'36"S, 152º19'12"E, 31 m AMSL) (1942–2024 normals, extremes 1892–2024)
Month	Jan	Feb	Mar	Apr	May	Jun	Jul	Aug	Sep	Oct	Nov	Dec	Year
Record high °C (°F)	38.9 (102.0)	38.6 (101.5)	38.5 (101.3)	34.9 (94.8)	31.7 (89.1)	29.7 (85.5)	29.0 (84.2)	31.1 (88.0)	36.5 (97.7)	35.8 (96.4)	37.7 (99.9)	40.2 (104.4)	40.2 (104.4)
Mean daily maximum °C (°F)	30.4 (86.7)	30.2 (86.4)	29.4 (84.9)	27.6 (81.7)	24.9 (76.8)	22.7 (72.9)	22.3 (72.1)	23.6 (74.5)	25.7 (78.3)	27.2 (81.0)	28.6 (83.5)	29.7 (85.5)	26.9 (80.4)
Mean daily minimum °C (°F)	21.5 (70.7)	21.4 (70.5)	20.2 (68.4)	17.6 (63.7)	14.2 (57.6)	11.6 (52.9)	10.3 (50.5)	10.9 (51.6)	13.7 (56.7)	16.6 (61.9)	18.8 (65.8)	20.6 (69.1)	16.5 (61.6)
Record low °C (°F)	14.1 (57.4)	12.2 (54.0)	9.7 (49.5)	6.7 (44.1)	3.3 (37.9)	0.7 (33.3)	−0.7 (30.7)	0.6 (33.1)	0.2 (32.4)	5.5 (41.9)	7.9 (46.2)	10.6 (51.1)	−0.7 (30.7)
Average precipitation mm (inches)	167.3 (6.59)	154.1 (6.07)	111.7 (4.40)	55.8 (2.20)	66.3 (2.61)	48.3 (1.90)	39.3 (1.55)	32.5 (1.28)	34.1 (1.34)	78.0 (3.07)	86.5 (3.41)	123.6 (4.87)	997.0 (39.25)
Average precipitation days (≥ 1.0 mm)	7.9	8.0	7.0	4.9	4.6	3.4	3.1	2.8	2.9	5.1	5.6	6.2	61.5
Average afternoon relative humidity (%)	61	62	59	57	54	52	49	47	49	54	57	60	55
Average dew point °C (°F)	20.1 (68.2)	20.2 (68.4)	18.5 (65.3)	16.2 (61.2)	12.8 (55.0)	10.6 (51.1)	8.8 (47.8)	9.0 (48.2)	11.5 (52.7)	14.6 (58.3)	16.9 (62.4)	18.6 (65.5)	14.8 (58.7)
Source: Bureau of Meteorology (1942–2024 normals, extremes 1892–2024)

== Suburbs of Bundaberg ==
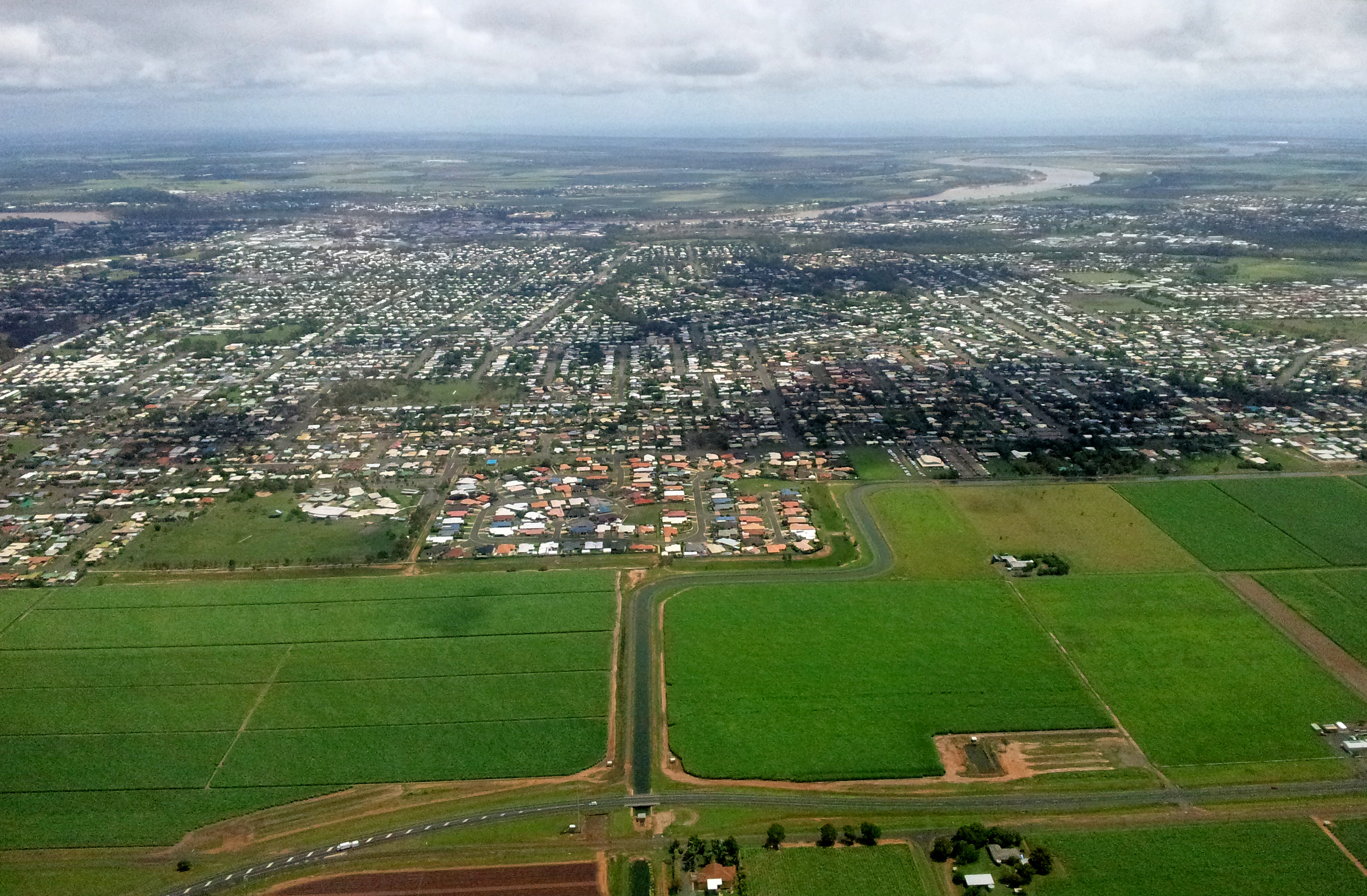
Aerial view to the north

- Avenell
- Avoca
- Branyan
- Bundaberg Central
- Bundaberg East
- Bundaberg North
- Bundaberg South
- Bundaberg West
- Kalkie
- Kepnock
- Millbank
- Norville
- Svensson Heights
- Thabeban
- Walkervale

Increasing population in Bundaberg is extending residential development into rural localities, such as Ashfield.

== Media ==
Local radio stations are ABC Wide Bay, Breeze 102.5, Triple M 93.1, and Rebel 106.7.

== Economy ==
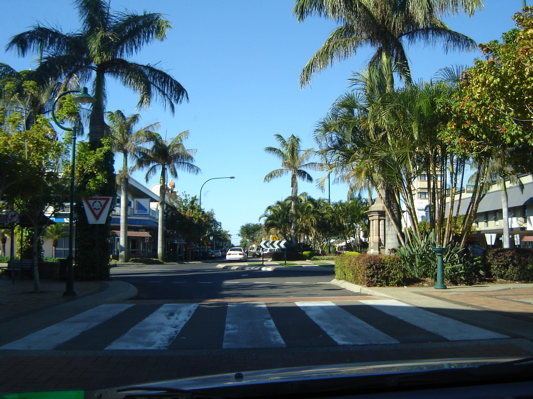
Looking down Bourbong Street, Bundaberg town centre.

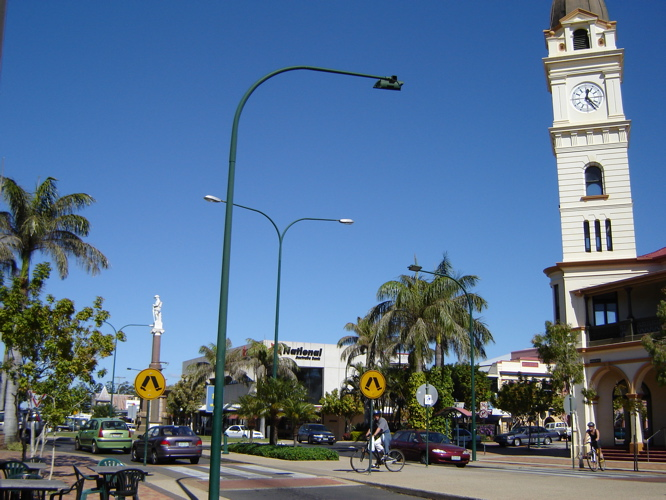
Bundaberg town centre with Bundaberg General Post Office to the right.

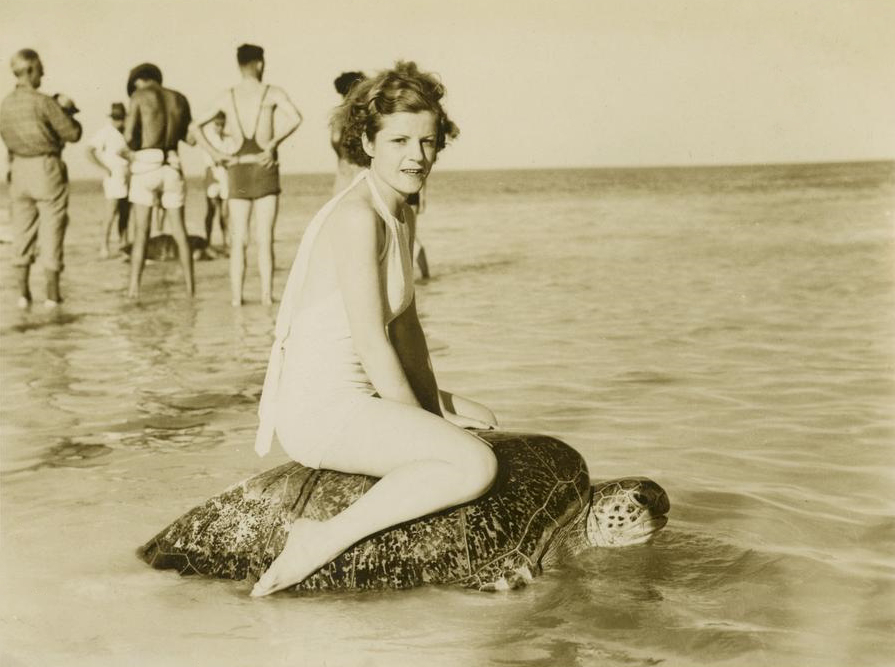
Young woman riding on the back of a turtle at Mon Repos Beach, near Bundaberg, ca. 1930.

Subtropical Bundaberg is dependent to a large extent on the local sugar industry. Extensive sugar cane fields have been developed throughout the district. Value-adding operations, such as the milling and refinement of sugar, and its packaging and distribution, are located around the city. A local factory that manufactured sugar-cane harvesters was closed down after it was taken over by the US multinational corporation Case New Holland. Most of the raw sugar is exported. A bulk terminal for the export of sugar is located on the Burnett River east of Bundaberg. Recent years have seen the reduction of cane farms and in turn increase of Macadamia farms, whoms main market is China.

Another of the city's exports is Bundaberg Rum, made from the sugar cane by-product molasses. Bundaberg is also home to beverage producer Bundaberg Brewed Drinks Vintage Soda, Craft Brewery Ballistic Brewing Company and Craft Distillery's Waterview Distillery and Kalki Moon.

Commercial fruit and vegetable production is also significant: avocado, banana, bean, button squash, capsicum, chilli, citrus, cucumber, custard apple, egg fruit, honeydew melon, lychee, mango, passionfruit, potato, pumpkin, rockmelon, snow peas, stone fruit, sweet corn, sweet potato, tomato, watermelon, zucchini. Macadamia nuts are also grown. Due to the year-round farm work available in Bundaberg, the city has a high number of working hostels for backpackers looking to extend their working holiday visa in Australia. The hostels provide backpackers with work on farms across the Bundaberg area. However, the hostels and farms have received huge criticism in the press and on social media due to the treatment some backpackers have faced. The Courier-Mail have reported claims of poor living conditions, underpayment and allegations of sexual abuse which they say has led to backpackers warning others about working hostels in Bundaberg.

Because of its high rate of unemployment, Bundaberg has been referred to as the "dole capital of Australia".

== Tourism ==
Tourism is an important industry in Queensland, and Bundaberg is known as the 'Southern Gateway to the Great Barrier Reef'. The city lies near the southern end of the reef in proximity to Lady Elliot and Lady Musgrave Islands. The nearby town of Bargara is an increasingly popular holiday and retirement destination.

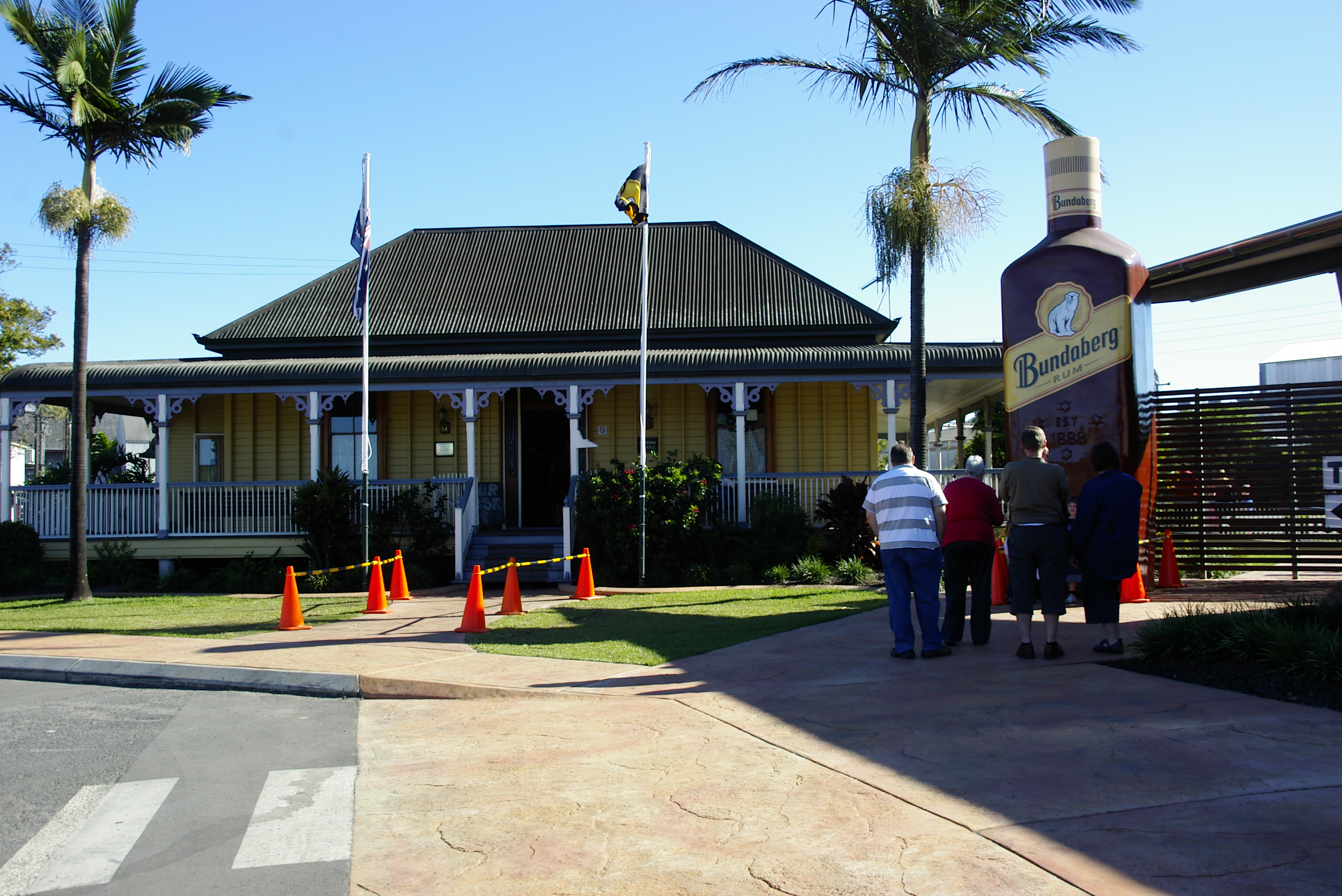
Bundaberg Rum Tours

Nearby beaches are popular with both locals and tourists. Moore Park Beach, to the city's north, has 20 kilometres (12 mi) of golden sandy beach. Beaches on the southern side of the Burnett River are (from north to south) the Oaks Beach, Mon Repos, Nielson Park, Bargara Beach, Kellys Beach, Innes Park and Elliott Heads.

Cania Gorge National Park, Deepwater National Park, Eurimbula National Park and Kinkuna National Park, located in the Bundaberg region are popular with campers and bush-lovers.

Tours of the Bundaberg Rum distillery and attractions at Bundaberg Botanic Gardens, such as the 2 ft narrow gauge Australian Sugar Cane Railway, are also popular with tourists. The Mystery Craters, 35 unexplained water-filled holes in the ground, discovered in 1971 at South Kolan, are also a tourist attraction.

Opened in 2002 by the former member for Hinkler Paul Neville, the Tom Quinn Community Centre gardens (a multiple "Bundy in Bloom" winner) is a site to be seen with local flora and fauna, its own cafe, marketplace, chapel, green house, training facilities, woodwork and indigenous nature section.

Opened in December 2008, the Hinkler Hall of Aviation is an historical aviation tourist attraction that celebrates pioneer solo aviator Bert Hinkler. In 1928, Hinkler was the first person to fly solo from England to Australia. The museum includes an exhibition hall, featuring multi-media exhibits, a flight simulator, a theatre, five aircraft and the historic Hinkler House.

Other local attractions and events include the Whaling Wall, East Bundaberg Water Tower, Baldwin Swamp Environmental Park, Alexandra Park Zoo, Buss Park, Barrell House, Bundy in Bloom, Whale watching, reef tours of Lady Musgrave & Lady Elliiot islands, the Bundaberg Show, Bundaberg & Childers Regional Art Galleries, the Bundaberg Gliding school, Fishing Charters, the Bundaberg International Air Show, and the Woongarra Marine Park.

Bundaberg has ghost tours.

=== Museums and galleries ===
The Bundaberg region contains a variety of museums and art galleries that showcase the region's history and culture.

- Hinkler Hall of Aviation
- Hinkler House
- Fairymead House and Sugar History Museum
- BRAG, the Bundaberg Regional Art Gallery
- CHARTS, the Childers Art Space
- Bundaberg and District Historical Museum
- Bundaberg Railway Museum
- Bundaberg Rum Distillery Tours
- Bundaberg Botanic Gardens containing the 'Hinkler Hall of Aviation', 'Hinkler House', 'Fairymead House' and the 'Bundaberg Steam Tramway Preservation Inc.'
- Mystery Craters in South Kolan
- Schmeider's Cooperage (Bundy Kegs)
- Bundaberg Ginger Beer

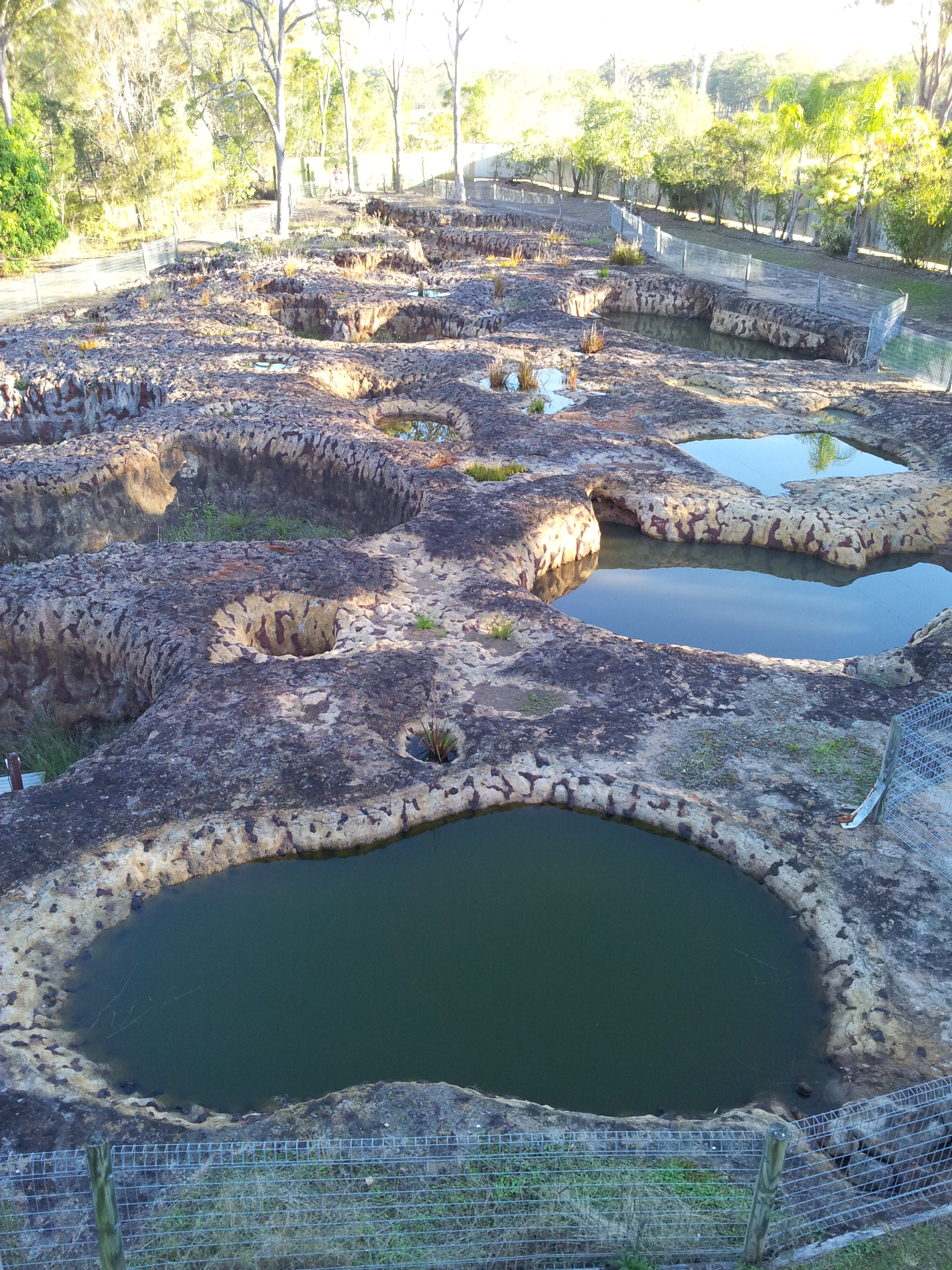
South Kolan Mystery Craters

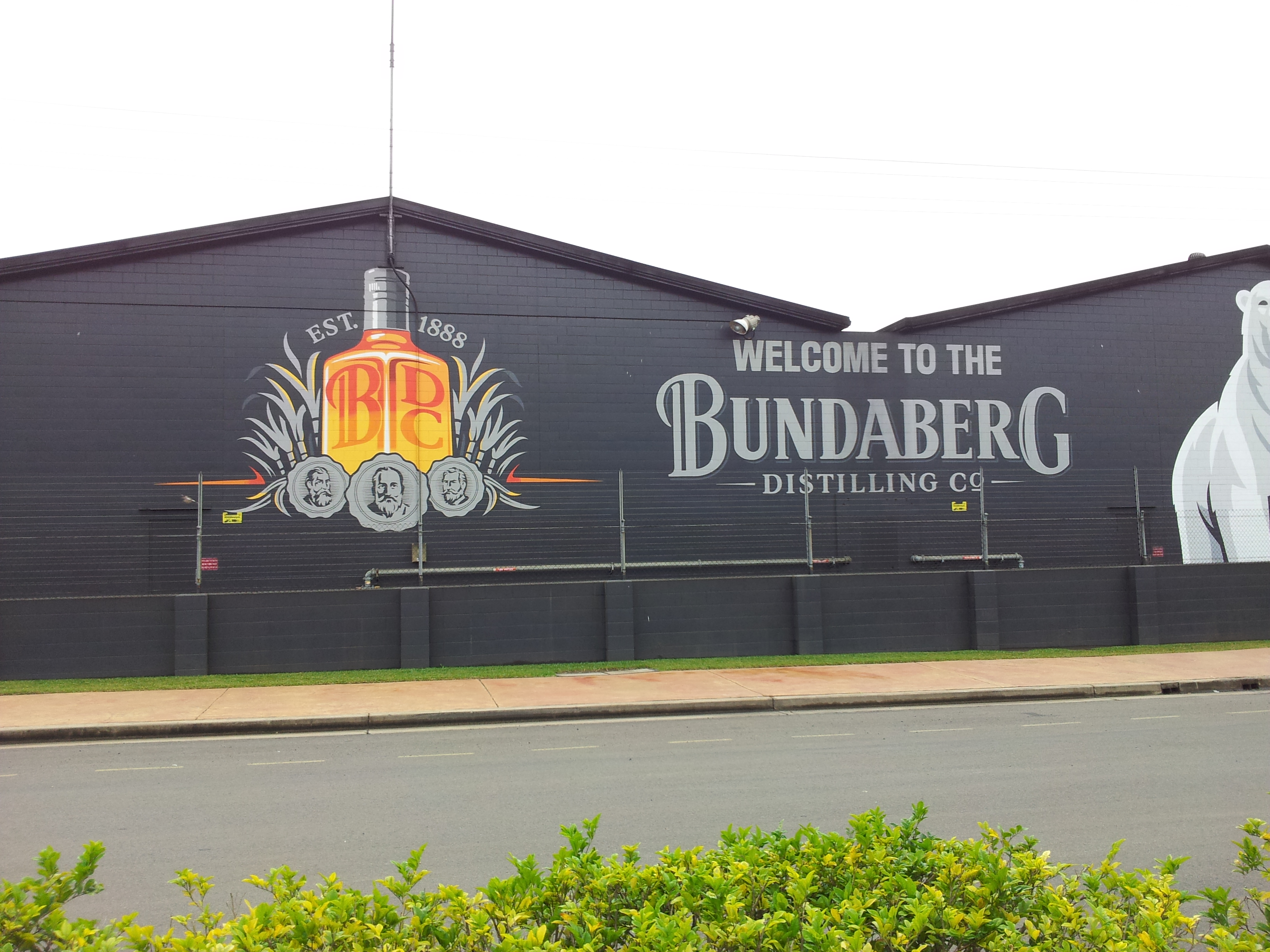
Bundaberg Rum Factory, Bundaberg

=== Memorials ===
- Bundaberg War Memorial
- Hinkler Memorial

== Culture ==
=== Arts and entertainment ===
Bundaberg has two cinemas. The Reading Cinemas, on Johanna Boulevarde, west Bundaberg, and the Moncrieff Entertainment Centre (formerly known as the Moncrieff Theatre), located on Bourbong Street, central Bundaberg. The Moncrieff Entertainment Centre also holds live musical and theatrical performances year round.

The Bundaberg Regional Art Gallery (BRAG) is a large multi-purpose visual arts facility located in central Bundaberg. The Bundaberg Regional Council operates a public library at 49 Woondooma Street.

=== Media ===
The NewsMail newspaper is published in Bundaberg from Monday to Saturday. It is available in print and online. Several community newspapers are also available including the Guardian, The Bugle & the Bundaberg Coastline.

- ABC Local Radio: Wide Bay 855 AM/100.1 FM – due to the terrain of the area, both AM and FM frequencies are used.
- 4BU 1332 AM (commercial) – owned by Grant Broadcasters
- Triple M 93.1 (commercial) – part of the Triple M Network, owned by Southern Cross Media Group .
- Hitz FM 93.9 (commercial) – owned by ARN
- Breeze 102.5 (commercial) Wide Bay
- Rebel 106.7 (commercial) Wide Bay
- 4BCR 94.7 FM (community)
- 4DoubleB 96.3 FM (community)
- Kix Country 97.1 FM (narrowcast) – owned by Grant Broadcasters
- RadioTAB 95.5 FM (narrowcast) – owned by Tatts Group
- ABC Classic 98.5 FM
- Triple J 99.3 FM
- ABC Radio National 100.9 FM

Bundaberg is served by three commercial television stations (Seven Queensland, WIN Television and 10) and publicly owned services (ABC TV) and (SBS).

Local news coverage of Bundaberg and the Wide Bay is provided on all three commercial networks with both Seven News and WIN Queensland's WIN News half-hour bulletins airing at 5:30 each weeknight. Southern Cross Austereo also airs brief local news & weather updates at various intervals throughout the day on Channel 10.

=== Popular culture ===
The city has featured in several films:

- The Delinquents (1989), starring Kylie Minogue, which was set in Bundaberg, but partly shot in Brisbane
- The Mango Tree (1977)
- Talking Back at Thunder (2014), starring Steven Tandy
- Flathead (2024), a docufiction film directed by Jaydon Martin

== Sport ==
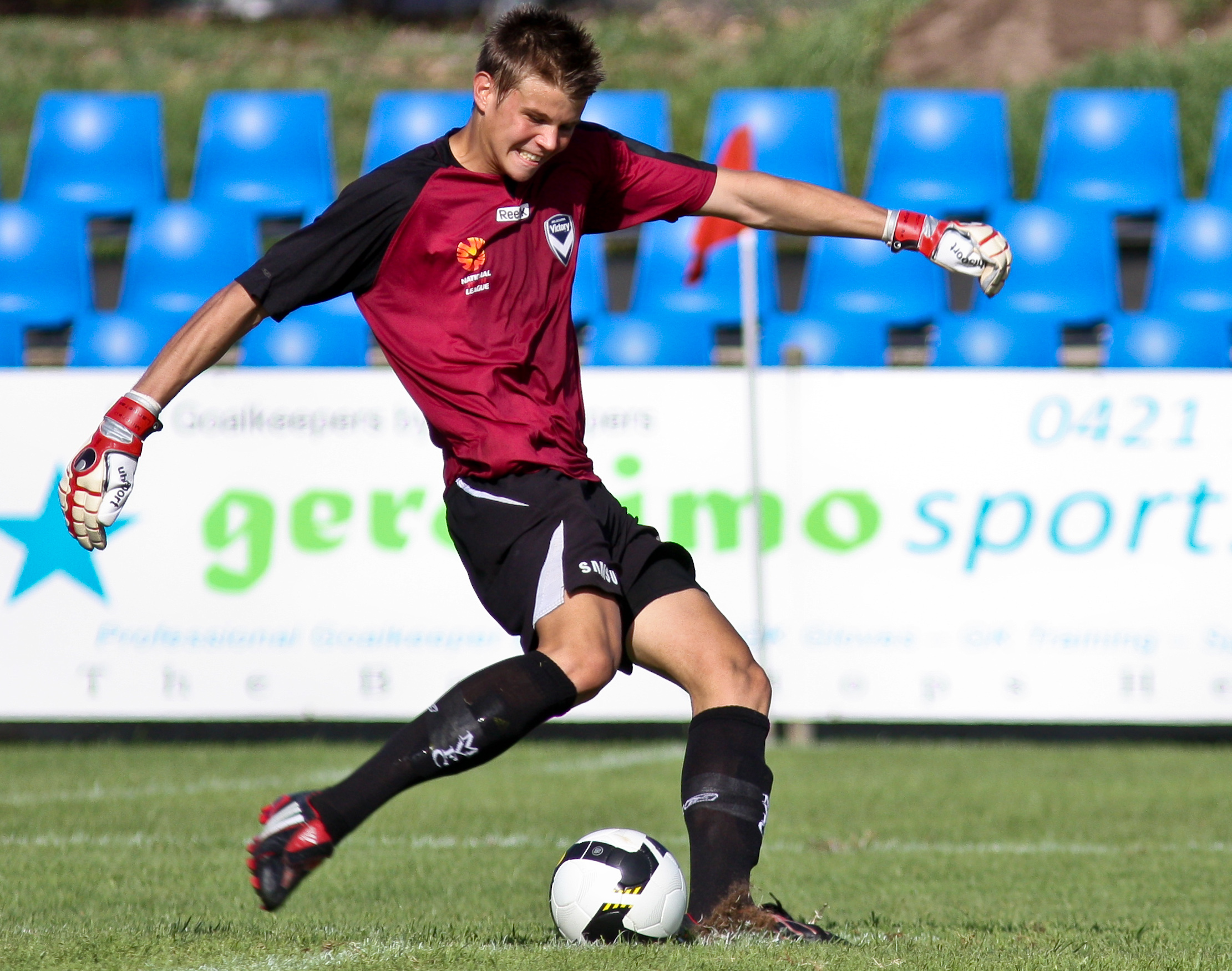
Mitchell Langerak, former Bundaberg footballer, who is now playing for Nagoya Grampus in the J1 League

Most major Australian sporting codes are played in Bundaberg.

=== Australian rules ===
Bundaberg has two current clubs playing in the AFL Wide Bay competition.

- Across The Waves Bundaberg Eagles (merger of North Bundaberg and Souths/ATW Magpies)
- Brothers Bulldogs (formerly West Bundaberg)

=== Basketball ===
Bundaberg has two professional teams competing in the ConocoPhillips Central Queensland Cup. They are the Bundaberg Bulls (men) and Bundaberg Bears (women) and both feature local players.

=== Chess ===
Bundaberg Chess Club was established in 1985.

=== Cricket ===
Bundaberg has five current clubs playing in the Bundaberg Cricket Association competition.

=== Croquet ===
Bundaberg Croquet Club is the oldest Croquet club in Australia.

=== Darts ===
Bundaberg Darts and Sports Association host's tournaments monthly.

=== Golf ===
Bundaberg has Bargara Golf Club, Bundaberg Golf Club and Coral Cove Golf Club.

=== Rowing ===
Bucca Weir, west of Bundaberg, is an eight lane rowing course home to Bundaberg Rowing Club. It hosts the Queensland School's Championship Regatta each year in September, as well as numerous local regattas.

=== Rugby league ===
The Bundaberg Rugby Football League is a nine-club competition run under the Queensland Rugby League's Central Division. Bundaberg competes in the Central Division's 47th Battalion Shield and the Bundaberg Grizzlies formerly competed in the Queensland Cup statewide competition.

=== Rugby union ===
Bundaberg and District Rugby Union is the governing body for Rugby union and run's a competition. Teams are:

- Waves Falcons
- Wests Barbarians
- East Pythons
- Brothers Turtles
- Hervey Bay Mariners

=== Football ===
The Bundaberg Soccer Football Association was formed at the Grand Hotel on 1 May 1923. In 2023 Bundaberg Football will celebrate the centenary of formation of the Association, however there's evidence that soccer football has been played in Bundaberg and surrounding districts since at least the 1890s.

Bundaberg was home to the Bundaberg Spirit soccer club. They participated in the Queensland State League against other teams across Queensland.

=== Tennis ===
The Bundaberg & District Tennis Senior Association operates eleven floodlit clay courts in Drinan Park, Bundaberg West at the corner of George & Powers Streets. Competition tennis is played all year round. The Bundaberg & District Junior Tennis Association operates five artificial grass courts, and two granite courts.

== Community groups ==
The Bundaberg branch of the Queensland Country Women's Association meets at the QCWA Hall at 15 Quay Street, Bundaberg Central. The Hinkler branch of the Queensland Country Women's Association meets at the McDonalds Central Bundaberg on the corner of Woongarra & Targo Street, Bundaberg Central.

== Education ==
There are many public and private primary schools in Bundaberg. Bundaberg South State School opened on 11 May 1891, with an enrollment of 167 students and under the direction of William Benbow. The school celebrated its 125-year anniversary in 2016.

Bundaberg has three public high schools, Bundaberg North State High School which opened on 29 January 1974, Bundaberg State High School which opened on 30 January 1912 (the second-oldest high school in Queensland that is still open) and Kepnock State High School which opened on 28 January 1964. There are also three main private secondary schools: Shalom Catholic College, St Luke's Anglican School, and Bundaberg Christian College.

There is a campus of the Wide Bay Institute of Technical and further education on Walker St and a campus of the Central Queensland University, located adjacent to the airport. There is a campus of the Booth College at the Salvation Army's Tom Quinn Community Centre.

== Transport ==
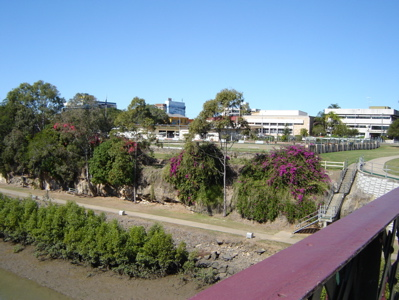
View of Bundaberg town centre from the Burnett River bridge.

Bundaberg Airport has flights to Brisbane and Lady Elliot Island. The city is home to the Jabiru Aircraft Company, which designs and manufactures a range of small civil utility aircraft.

Bundaberg's bus operator is Duffy's City Buses. As of 2013, they transport over 1000 passengers in town services, and over 2000 passengers in school services every day. Routes extend to the beach suburbs of Burnett Heads, Bargara, and Innes Park. Stewart & Sons also operates bus services in the area.

Bundaberg is serviced by several Queensland Rail passenger trains, including the Tilt Train and is approximately four and a half hours north of Brisbane by rail. The closed North Bundaberg station formerly served the Mount Perry railway line and is now a museum.

Bundaberg is situated at the end of the Isis Highway (State Route 3), approximately 50 kilometres (31 mi) east of its junction with the Bruce Highway. Many long-distance bus services also pass through the city.

Bundaberg Port is located 20 kilometres (12 mi) northeast of the city, at the mouth of the Burnett River. The port is a destination for ships from Australia and overseas. It is predominantly used for shipping raw sugar and other goods related to that industry such as Bundaberg Rum.

== Health ==
Bundaberg is served by three hospitals. One public hospital, Bundaberg Base Hospital on Bourbong St, and two private hospitals, Friendly Society Private Hospital & Mater Hospital.

The Friendly Society Hospital has undergone a redevelopment and forms part of the GP Super Clinic Program.

Bundaberg is also home to the Royal Flying Doctor Service, who regularly transport patients to Bundaberg from more rural and remote areas, as well as transferring critically ill patients to Brisbane for specialist care.

== Military ==
Bundaberg houses two military bases. Bundaberg Army Barracks and Training Ship (TS) Bundaberg. Bundaberg barracks contains mostly infantrymen and army cadets. TS Bundaberg houses mostly Cadet staff and Navy Cadets.

== Sister cities ==
The city council responsible for the Bundaberg Region maintains Sister City arrangements with two cities.

City	Since
Nanning, China	12 May 1998
Settsu, Japan	9 November 1998

== People ==
=== Notable residents ===
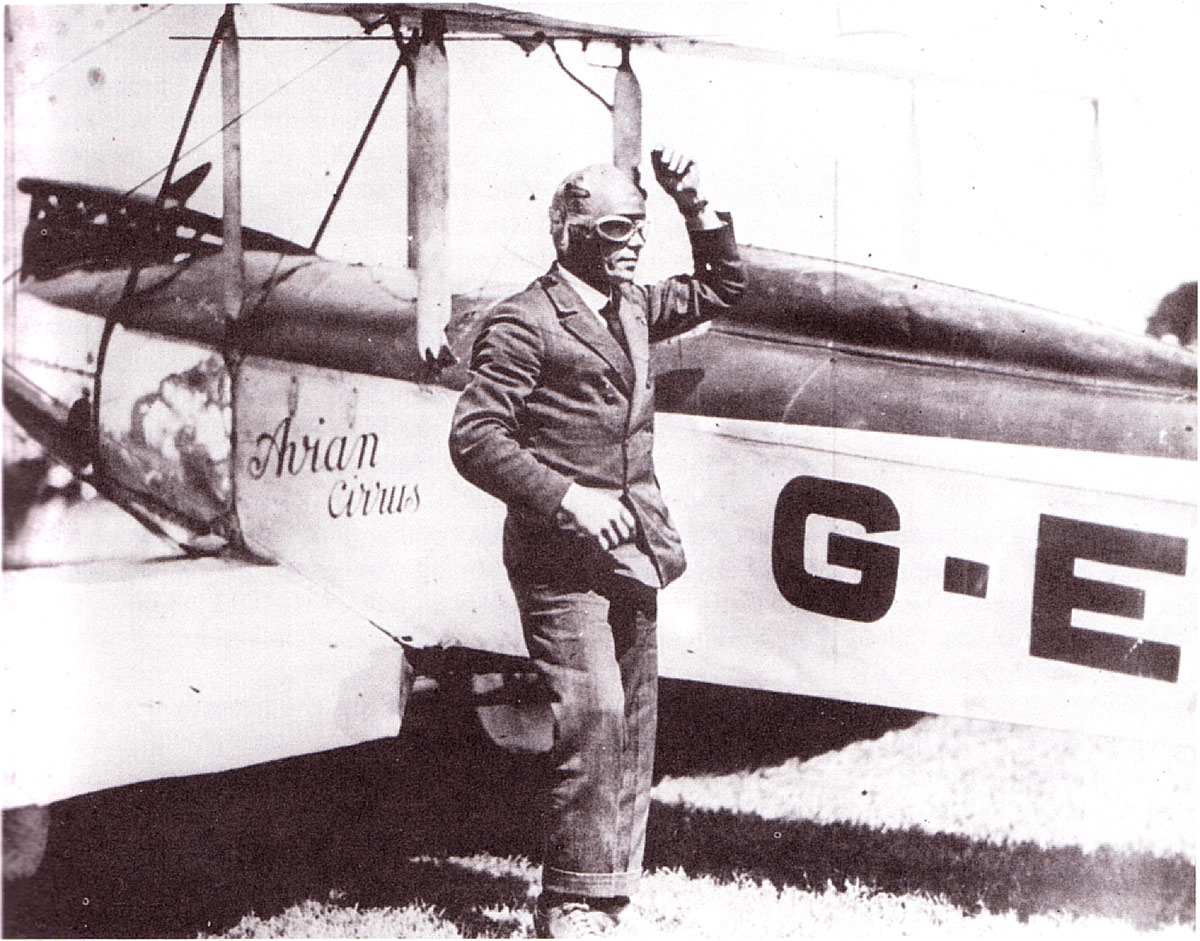
Bert Hinkler is memorialised in many places throughout Bundaberg

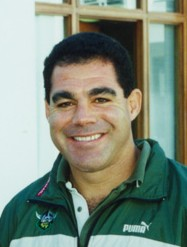
Mal Meninga is an inductee of the Australian Rugby League Hall of Fame

- Mason Barbera, racing driver
- Clint Bolton, association football player, Socceroo, 2 time A-League championship winning player
- Joshua Brillante, Australian soccer player
- David Carter, tennis player
- Wayne Coles-Janess, producer and director, documentary and feature films
- Allan Davis, Road racing cyclist, 2009 Tour Down Under Winner
- Troy Elder, field hockey player
- Steve Goodall, cyclist, 1978 Commonwealth Games Bronze Medalist, 1976 Olympian
- Noel Hazzard, rugby league footballer
- Coen Hess, rugby league footballer
- Bert Hinkler, pioneer aviator
- Antonio Kaufusi, rugby league footballer
- Felise Kaufusi, rugby league footballer
- Olivia Knight, Irish-Australian poet, essayist, translator and teacher
- Mitchell Langerak, association football player, A-League championship winning player
- Rosemary Lassig, Olympic swimmer
- David Surrey Littlemore, architect
- Ben Marschke, rugby league footballer
- Jesse Marschke, rugby league footballer
- Errol McCormack, retired Chief of Air Force (1998–2001), Officer of the Order of Australia (1998)
- Rheed McCracken, 2012 Summer Paralympics, won a silver and bronze medal
- Sarah McLellan, dancer and entertainer, lead singer of the group Lez Zeppelin and blogger of "The Aussie who ate the Big Apple" currently living in New York
- Mal Meninga, rugby league footballer and coach
- Tom Miles, professional athlete/sprinter, winner 1927 Stawell Gift, 1928 World Champion
- Gladys Moncrieff, singer
- Clinton Moore, freestyle motocross rider
- Vance Palmer, writer
- Jayant Patel, the alleged "Doctor Death" of the Bundaberg Base Hospital
- Ian Quinn, Golden Guitar winner & singer/songwriter
- Tony Rea, rugby league footballer and coach
- Chris Sarra, 2004 Queenslander of the Year
- Donald Smith, operatic tenor
- Michelle Steele, Winter Olympian at the 2006 Winter Olympics
- Don Tallon, Australian cricketer
- Keith Thiele, World War II Pilot (awarded DSO, DFC & 2 medal bars)
- Tommy Trash, ARIA and Grammy nominated Australian DJ & Producer
- Shane Tichowitsch, darts player

=== Representatives ===
Current

- Tom Smith, (Labor), State member for Bundaberg
- Keith Pitt (Liberal National Party of Queensland), Federal member for Hinkler

Former

- Prime Ministers Andrew Fisher and Frank Forde both represented Federal electorates that included Bundaberg, though neither was originally from the area.

== See also ==
- Bargara
- Childers
- Avenell Heights
