= Fairymead =

Fairymead may refer to:

- Fairymead, Queensland, a locality in the Bundaberg Region, Queensland, Australia
- Fairymead House, a heritage-listed house in Bundaberg North, Queensland, Australia
