= The Breeze (Australia) =

Tamborine Mountain, Queensland, Australia; Australia
- Broadcast area: RCRS North East Zone RA1
- Frequency: 100.6 MHz FM

Programming
- Language: English
- Format: Oldies, classic hits

Ownership
- Owner: Rebel Media Group P/L; (Rebel FM Stereo Pty Ltd)
- Sister stations: Rebel FM

History
- First air date: 31 January 2003
- Call sign meaning: 4 – Queensland; BReeZe

Technical information
- Power: 2 KW
- Repeater: various

Links
- Website: The Breeze

The Breeze (callsign: 4BRZ) is a Soft Adult Contemporary and classic hits formatted radio station, based in the Gold Coast suburb of Helensvale, Queensland, and broadcasting across regional and rural areas of Queensland and New South Wales. First broadcast in 2003, it is owned and operated by Rebel Media, which also operates Rebel FM.

== Breeze Frequencies ==
=== New South Wales ===
- 97.7 FM Gloucester
- 102.5 FM Tenterfield

=== Queensland ===
- 89.7 FM Biloela & Moura
- 92.9 FM Canungra
- 95.5 FM Chinchilla
- 90.1 FM Collinsville
- 92.1 FM Cooktown
- 100.6 FM Gold Coast
- 98.7 FM Goondiwindi
- 103.3 FM Kooralbyn
- 92.1 FM Logan & Beaudesert
- 101.3 FM Miles
- 104.5 FM Richmond
- 90.1 FM Stanthorpe
- 94.1 FM Taroom
- 99.5 FM Theodore
- 97.7 FM Weipa
- 102.5 FM Wide Bay (Bundaberg, Maryborough & Hervey Bay)
