= Bundaberg Botanic Gardens =

Botanical garden in Bundaberg, Queensland

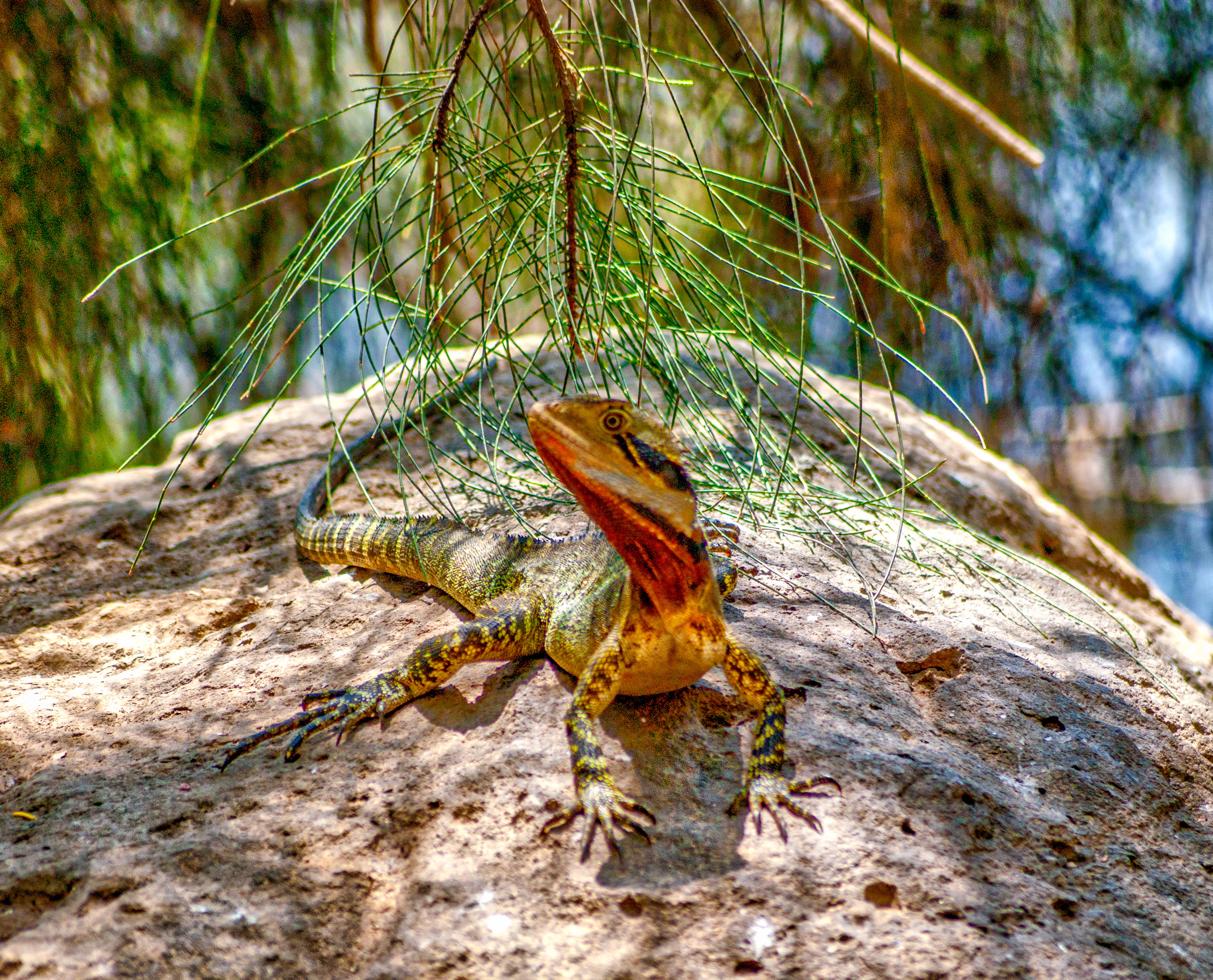
- Eastern Water Dragon at Bundaberg Botanic Gardens
- Interactive map of Bundaberg Botanic Gardens
- Location: Queensland, Australia
- Nearest city: Bundaberg
- Coordinates: 24°51′8″S 152°20′10″E
- Area: 27 hectares (67 acres)
- Created: 1988
- Open: 7 days a week 5.30 am to 6.45 pm September to April 6.30 am to 6 pm May to August
- Website: https://www.bundaberg.qld.gov.au/Community/Things-to-see-and-do/Bundaberg-Botanic-Gardens

Bundaberg Botanic Gardens is a public park and botanic garden located in Bundaberg, Queensland, Australia. The gardens were established in 1988 and cover an area of about 27 hectares in the north of the city, serving as one of the favourite leisure spots for residents and visitors of Bundaberg.

Several city attractions are located here, including the Hinkler Hall of Aviation, dedicated to aviation pioneer Bert Hinkler, as well as the Bundaberg and District Historical Museum. A miniature steam railway, operated by local volunteers, also runs through the gardens on certain days. The grounds also feature lakes, walking paths, and picnic areas.

The Bundaberg Botanic Gardens house a large collection of native and exotic plants, including a rare fruit orchard, the tallest heliconia in the world, and Chinese and Japanese gardens.

== Japanese Garden ==
Construction of the Japanese garden began in 2004 to honour Settsu, Bundaberg's sister city in Japan. The Japanese garden includes cascading ponds, torii gates, liquidambars, and azaleas, whose blooming is celebrated every spring.
