= Rebel FM =

Tamborine Mountain, Queensland, Australia; Australia
- Broadcast area: Gold Coast, Queensland
- Frequency: 99.4 MHz FM

Programming
- Language: English
- Format: Active rock

Ownership
- Owner: Rebel Media Group P/L; (Rebel FM Stereo Pty Ltd)
- Sister stations: The Breeze

History
- First air date: 30 November 1996
- Former call signs: 4SUN (1996–2003)
- Call sign meaning: 4 – Queensland; ReBeL

Technical information
- Repeater: various

Links
- Website: Rebel FM

Rebel FM (callsign: 4RBL) is an Active rock-formatted radio station, based in the Gold Coast suburb of Helensvale, Queensland, and broadcasting across regional and rural areas of Queensland and New South Wales. First broadcast as SUN FM in 1996, it is owned and operated by Rebel Media, which also operates The Breeze.

== Frequencies ==
=== New South Wales ===
- 93.7 FM Tenterfield

=== Queensland ===
- 95.9 FM Alpha
- 88.9 FM Biloela & Moura
- 93.7 FM Canungra
- 104.9 FM Century Mine
- 97.1 FM Chinchilla
- 94.9 FM Collinsville
- 99.3 FM Cooktown
- 99.4 FM Gold Coast
- 96.3 FM Goondiwindi
- 99.5 FM Julia Creek
- 98.1 FM Karumba
- 102.5 FM Kooralbyn
- 90.5 FM Logan & Beaudesert
- 94.5 FM Miles
- 101.7 FM Normanton
- 99.7 FM Richmond
- 97.1 FM Stanthorpe
- 92.5 FM Taroom
- 94.7 FM Theodore
- 96.1 FM Weipa
- 106.7 FM Wide Bay (Bundaberg, Maryborough & Hervey Bay)
