= Waterview, Queensland =

Neighbourhood in Bundaberg

Coordinates: 24.855°S 152.354°E

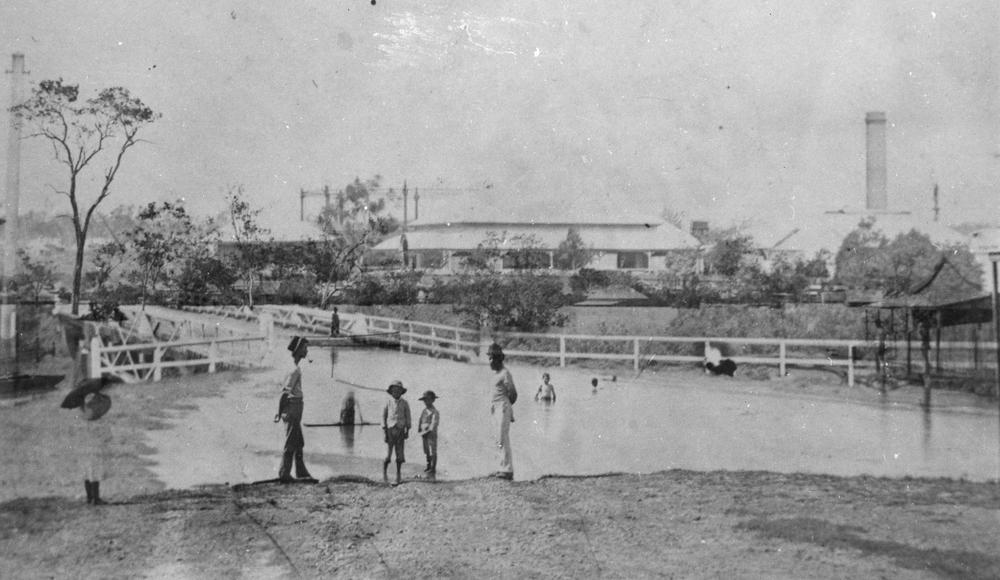
Waterview before the flood

Waterview is a neighbourhood in Bundaberg North, Bundaberg, Queensland, Australia on the north bank of the Burnett River.

== History ==
In 1868, Samuel Johnston established a sawmill at Waterview, downstream from Steuart and Watson holdings. This sawmill enabled Waterview to kickstart its lumber industry.

After Waterview sawmill was established, Samuel Johnston built the Waterview sugar mill. In 1872, commercial sugar cane production began in Waterview. The sugar industry was also supported by plantations that belonged to mill owners and plantation owners.

== Waterview Distillery ==
In 1892, Waterview sugar mill began operating its own distillery. The distillery’s products, which were called Waterview rum, directly competed with those from Bundaberg Distillery.

In 1903, the Waterview surgar mill was destroyed by floods, and had to cease operations. In addition, the Waterview sawmill, with £300 worth of sawn and dressed timber and £500 worth of logs, was destroyed. The Bundaberg Foundry also received serious injury.

Mr. Samuel Johnston lost 230 out of 280 acres of his land during the flood.

== Waterview unearthed ==
On 11 December 2013, an excavation team unearthed a barrel of Waterview rum in Waterview estate, part of a product launch for Waterview Distilling Company's, "Unearthed" range.
