= Fairymead House =

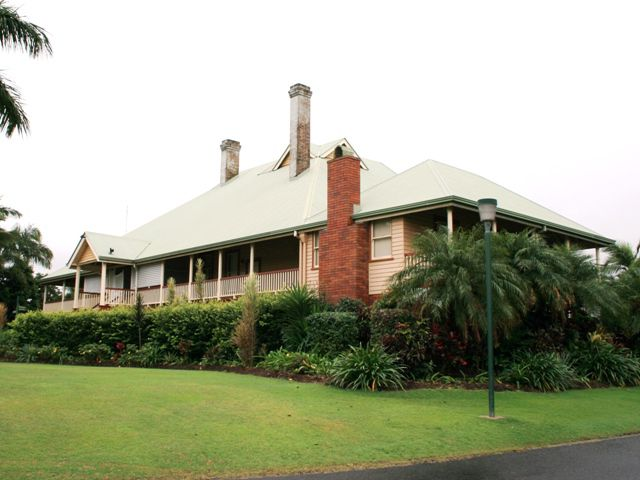
- Fairymead House, 2009

- Location within Queensland Location within Australia
- 24.8556°S 152.336°E
- Location: Thornhill Street, Bundaberg North, Bundaberg Region, Queensland, Australia

History
- Design period: 1870s–1890s (late 19th century)
- Built: 1890

Site notes
- Architect: John Shedden Adam

Queensland Heritage Register
- Official name: Fairymead House
- Type: state heritage (built)
- Designated: 22 February 2002
- Reference no.: 601009
- Significant period: 1890s (fabric); 1890s–1980s (historical)

Fairymead House is a heritage-listed homestead at Thornhill Street, Bundaberg North, Bundaberg Region, Queensland, Australia. It was designed by John Shedden Adam and built in 1890. It was added to the Queensland Heritage Register on 22 February 2002.

== History ==
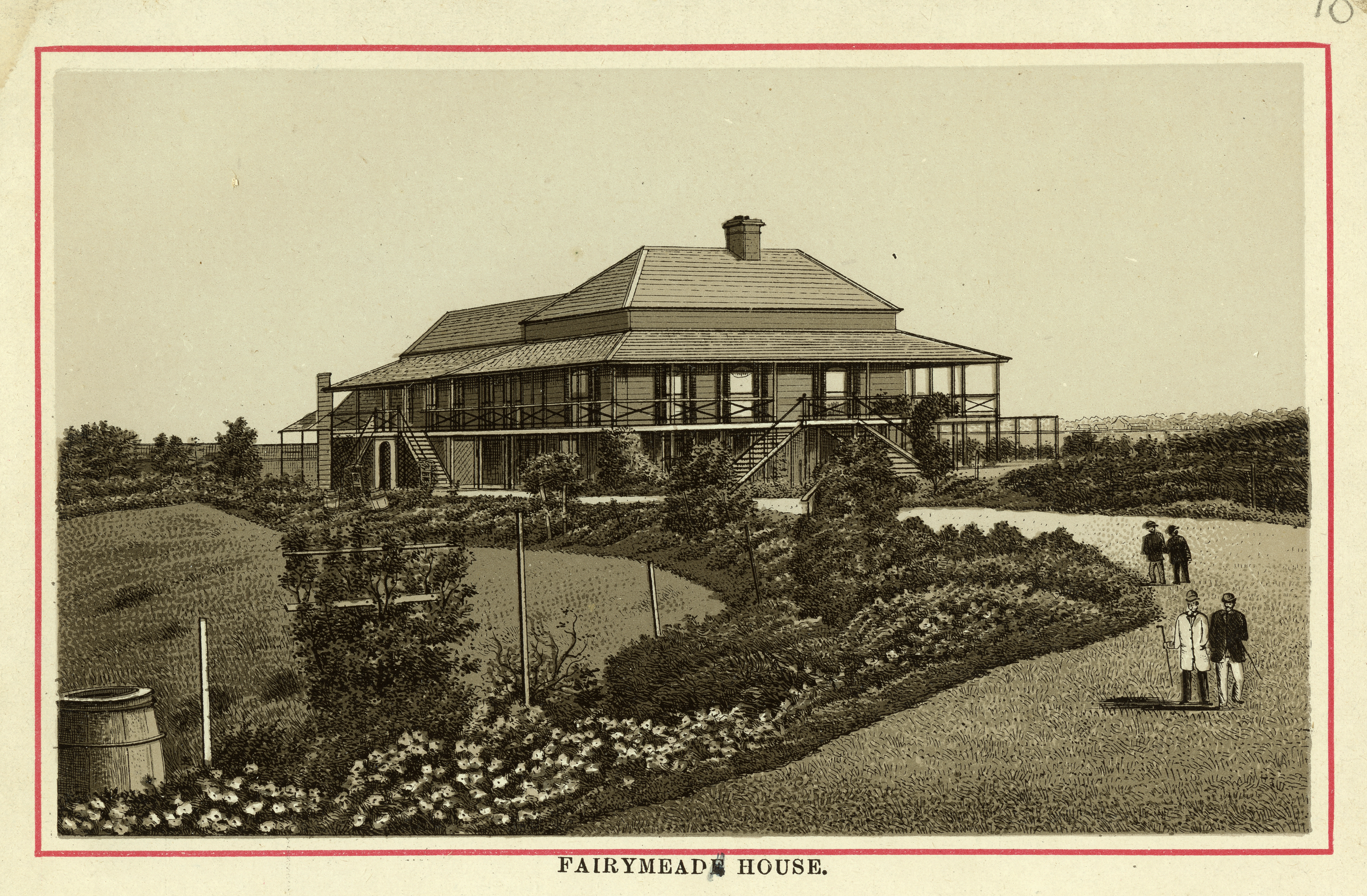
Fairymead House, circa 1894

Fairymead House, a grand plantation home, was built on land adjacent to the Fairymead Sugar Plantation, Bundaberg, in 1890, for Ernest and Margaret Young. Ernest Young and his father Henry and brothers Arthur, and Horace, established one of Bundaberg's earliest independent sugar plantations and processing mills, the Fairymead Sugar Plantation.

The origin of Bundaberg's sugar industry dates back more than 100 years to the introduction of the Sugar and Coffee Regulations Act 1864. Faced with the high cost of importing sugar from overseas, the Colony wanted to find a way to encourage people to invest in sugarcane growing. The Sugar and Coffee Regulations Act 1864, was introduced into the Queensland Legislative Assembly by Charles Coxen, member for the Northern Downs. The proposed regulations of the Act permitted persons or companies to select land suitable for sugar in lots ranging from half a square mile to two square miles. The introduction of the Act brought about a renewed interest in sugar cane growing and people raced to accumulate land up and down the coast of Queensland.

The Brown brothers, Alfred and Arthur, were one of many who acquired land under the Sugar and Coffee Regulations Act 1864. In the early 1870s, the brothers acquired 13 square kilometres of land and developed the cattle property, Tantitha. Working under the Act the brothers divided up a central section of their property into three blocks, Jamaica, Barbados and Mauritius and experimented with the growing of sugarcane. These subdivided sections later became known as Fairymead, after a friend of the family visited the plantation and described the place as being like a "fairy mead" on a misty morning. The Brown's abandoned their venture into sugar after the floods of 1875, which saw the land swamped and the cane trampled by cattle. They sold the 5 square miles of land devoted to sugarcane to the Young family in 1878.

Arthur and Horace Young, with their younger brother Ernest, began to transform Fairymead into a profitable, state of the art, sugar plantation. Like many others who had heard of the potentially profitable sugar industry in Queensland's north, Arthur, Horace and Ernest had no knowledge of the sugar industry except their father's theoretical experience. They had formally held two sheep stations in New Zealand, but when rabbits devastated these stations in 1878, the brothers began an eight-month search for another suitable investment. Their original intent was to investigate the pastoral possibilities in Australia but they were immediately won over by the possibility of a profitable sugar industry in Queensland.

Arthur and Horace began operations at Fairymead in 1880, while Ernest went to England to acquire some necessary equipment for the plantation. By 1883 the rougher pioneering work was done and the first major crop harvested. For the first two years the Young's punted the juice from their crops to Millaquin plantation and sugar refinery. In 1884 they installed a clarification unit and boiling plant, which enabled them to refine their own sugar as well as the sugar crops of smaller plantations in the Bundaberg region. By the end of 1884 cane from the Fairymead plantation, processed by their own mill, was producing 15 long tons (15 t) of sugar daily.

The Young brothers were also responsible for the introduction of a number of innovative cane harvesting and crushing techniques, many of which are still in use today. In setting up Fairymead Mill the Young brothers chose to install 81-centimetre (32 in) rollers imported from Glasgow to crush the cane instead of the standard 76-centimetre (30 in) rollers. They installed a Relieux furnace to improve processing efficiency of the raw juice and in c. 1882, they initiated the use of Fowler's tramway system to bring cane to the mill, introducing the now universal system of cane railways to the Bundaberg district. In 1902 the Young brothers established an irrigation system to help combat the effects of long periods of drought in the region and began working towards the mechanisation of the cane harvesting industry.

In 1938 the Young Brothers took their first step towards the mechanisation of cane harvesting by financing the development of a new single-row cane-cutting machine. This machine was a significant advance in cane-cutting technology, capable of cutting over 200 metric tons (200 long tons; 220 short tons) per day in straight cane. This investment paid off during the labour shortages of World War II. The rest of the district also benefited from Fairymead's reduced demand for cane cutters, who were made more available to service other sugar plantations in the region. Their second step was the development of the successful two-row cane-cutting machine. This machine was a post-war development thanks to the mechanical skills of Jim Vichie and the encouragement of Charles Young (son of Ernest and Margaret Young).

In 1972 Fairymead Sugar Company merged with Gibson and Howes Pty Limited to form the Bundaberg Sugar Company Limited. Milliquin Sugar Company Pty Limited became part of the group in 1975. In the 121 years since the first primitive sugar juice mill crushed the area's first successful cane crop, Fairymead and the sugar industry has played a major role in the development and prosperity of the city and surrounding district. Fairymead Sugar Plantation is still one of Australia's largest cane farms today.

Fairymead House was built on land adjacent to Fairymead plantation in 1890. It was the principal residence of Ernest and Margaret Young and other members of the Young family for over 60 years. It is a good example of the grandeur of plantation accommodation in the late 19th and early 20th century.

Fairymead House was designed by Sydney architect John Shedden Adam. It is a large plantation-style home with a floor area of 600 square metres and 16-foot (4.9 m) ceilings. The extremely high ceilings are a feature of the house and were incorporated in the design to provide some relief against the Queensland summer heat. Architect, John Shedden Adam, introduced a number of special inclusions in his design to accommodate requests made by his sister, Margaret Young. One request was to design the front stairs with a landing a couple of feet from the ground so that she could alight from her carriage without soiling her shoes.

Between World War I and World War II the house was used as single men's quarters by Fairymead mill and plantation workers. In the early 1950s the house was used for European refugee accommodation. In 1960 Christopher Young (grandson of Ernest and Margaret Young) moved his family back into Fairymead House and remained there until 1986.

=== Museum ===
In 1988 the Bundaberg Sugar Company Ltd gave Fairymead House to the City of Bundaberg as a building of "significant historical importance to the district" and as the Company's Bicentennial gift to the City. The Bundaberg City Council agreed to provide a site for the home and Fairymead was relocated to the City's Botanic Gardens on the corner of Young Street and Mt Perry Road.

In 1990 the Bundaberg City Council began work on a development plan for Fairymead House and over the next four years undertook a number of conservation works on the property. The adaptive re-use of the property from a residence to a museum involved utilising the space underneath the house, which was subsequently bricked in to provide room for a theatrette and Life Education Centre. The interior of the original home has undergone very few structural changes since its construction in 1890 and many of the rooms have been furnished according to their original use. Most rooms contain a series of static displays illustrating the lifestyle of a plantation owner in the late 19th century and the social aspects of the development of the sugar industry.

Fairymead house opened to the public in 1994 and now operates as a memorial to north Queensland's sugar industry and the Young family's contribution to the development of the sugar industry in the Bundaberg District.

== Description ==
Fairymead House is situated within the Bundaberg Botanic Gardens, located on the corner of Mt Perry Road and Young Street, Bundaberg. Sited on the southern boundary of the botanic gardens at the end of Thornhill Street, the house is on elevated land and surrounded by well manicured gardens. The principal entry to the place is off Thornhill Street and a bitumen car park is located in front of the house.

Built in the Indian Bungalow Style, Fairymead House is an impressive two-storey timber and masonry residence with a large hipped corrugated iron roof. The house has been relocated to this site and as a result, a definite distinction can be made between the original timber fabric of the upper floor and the new masonry structure of the ground floor.

The ground floor of the house is constructed on a combination of concrete posts to the exterior and steel columns internally. Spanning between the concrete posts are timber battened valances. The walls to the ground floor are face brick and mirror the perimeter walls to the upper floor core of the house. The ground surface directly under the upper floor verandah is paved. Internally the ground floor is a large open space, which is used for museum exhibition purposes as well as storage.

The upper floor of the house is of timber construction clad with timber chamferboard. The verandah surrounds the entire core of the house and links the separate kitchen building with the main house. The Verandah comprises timber floors, posts and handrails with timber batten infill panels forming the balustrade. Timber lattice doors and panels are located at points where timber stairs adjoin the verandah.

Entry to the upper floor is via a set of centrally located timber stairs, which lead to the upper verandah and front door. Flanking the entry foyer is the function room to the left, the Margaret room to right and skylight room at the end of the foyer. The function room is the largest room of the house and comprises the original dining and drawing rooms. As such it has a dual fireplace.

The skylight room ceiling is punctuated by a leadlight skylight and is currently used as gathering entry space to the museum as well as housing exhibits. Leading off the skylight room are the Toft room, Store Bell room and Gooburrum room, all of which house museum exhibits.

Internally the floors are predominately polished timber with the exception of the function room, which is carpeted. The walls and ceilings are clad with timber tongue and groove boards and the original timber joinery to doors and windows appears to be intact.

== Heritage listing ==
Fairymead House was listed on the Queensland Heritage Register on 22 February 2002 having satisfied the following criteria.

The place is important in demonstrating the evolution or pattern of Queensland's history.

Fairymead House was built in 1890 for Ernest and Margaret Young, on land adjacent to the Fairymead Sugar Plantation, Bundaberg. Although relocated in 1989 to the Bundaberg Botanic Gardens, the house is a rare example of the grandeur of plantation style accommodation of the late 19th and early 20th century and attests to the development of north Queensland's sugar industry.

The place demonstrates rare, uncommon or endangered aspects of Queensland's cultural heritage.

Although relocated in 1989 to the Bundaberg Botanic Gardens, the house is a rare example of the grandeur of plantation-style accommodation of the late 19th and early 20th century and attests to the development of north Queensland's sugar industry.

The place is important in demonstrating the principal characteristics of a particular class of cultural places.

Designed by Sydney architect, John Shedden Adam, the architectural style of Fairymead House demonstrates an approach to building design that was influenced by climate and culture. In particular, the Indian Bungalow style home features 16-foot (4.9 m) ceilings, wide verandahs and extended eves, designed to provide shade and natural cooling against the Queensland summer heat.

The place is important because of its aesthetic significance.

Although relocated in 1989 to the Bundaberg Botanic Gardens, the house is a rare example of the grandeur of plantation-style accommodation of the late 19th and early 20th century and attests to the development of north Queensland's sugar industry.

The place has a special association with the life or work of a particular person, group or organisation of importance in Queensland's history.

Fairymead House also reflects the life and work of the Young brothers, Henry, Horace and Ernest, who established one of Bundaberg's earliest and most successful sugar plantations. The Young brothers made a number of valuable contributions to the development of the sugar industry in Queensland. They established state of the art irrigation systems to combat drought, integrated more efficient cane processing techniques and introduced the now universal cane transport system, the Fowler's tramway. Fairymead House now operates as a museum dedicated to Bundaberg's sugar industry. The rooms within the Young's home have been furnished to reflect their original use and contain a series of static displays illustrating the lifestyle of Ernest and Margaret Young, a pioneering family of the late 19th century, and their contribution to the establishment of Queensland's sugar industry.
