= Samuel Johnston (Waterview) =

Australian businesspeople (1840-1924)

Samuel Johnston Snr
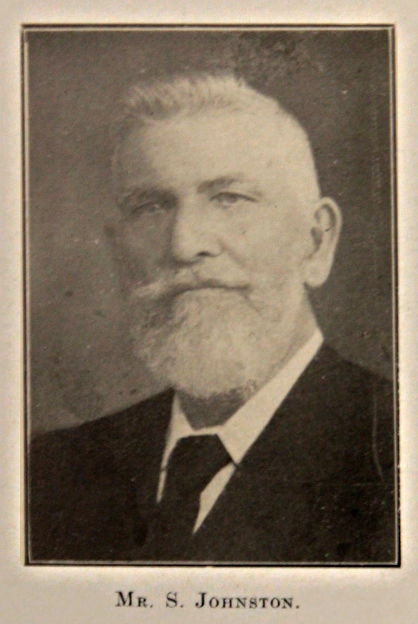
- A photo of Samuel Johnston Snr, circa 1890.
- Born: 23 January 1840; Kilrea, County Londonderry, Northern Ireland
- Died: 10 November 1924 (aged 84)
- Occupations: Cane Farmer, Sawmiller, Entrepreneur
- Spouse: Ann Denahy (1841-1898)
- Children: James Barret Johnston (1864-1948) John 'Jack' Johnston (1866-1935) Mary Johnston (1866-1954) Elizabeth Johnston (1867-1947) Annie Johnston (1869-1930) Margaret Ellen Johnston (1871-1953) William Samuel 'Bill' Johnston (1874-1952) Isabella Johnston (1874-1960) Samuel Johnston Jnr (1875-1947) Sarah Johnston (1877-1952) Florence Jane Johnston (1879-1912) Ethel Johnston (1881-1960)

Samuel Johnston Snr (born 1840, Drumsara, County Londonderry; died 10 November 1924) was an Australian pioneer, arriving in Victoria, in 1858 from County Londonderry; like so many immigrants of the time he made his way to the gold diggings. Gold mining and industry eventually led him to Queensland, where he proved himself to be a most useful pioneer to whose efforts the state owes the rapid development of previously unsettled and practically unknown portions of her territory.

Heading north, he ended up in Rockhampton; which, when in its infancy he owned a sawmill on the Fitzroy River. After a period spent in Rockhampton, he moved further south to the Burnett. In 1867 he purchased a site on the northern banks of the Burnett River to erect his sawmill, which he bought in by the ketch "Violet"; the first vessel to enter the river. He is the man responsible for establishing the Waterview Estate.

In 1867the town of Bundaberg was yet to be established by the government. Bundaberg was many years away and started its journey on the south banks of the Burnett River after surveyors travelled north from Brisbane to gazette the site that would later become Bundaberg. Until this time the area had become known as "Waterview" no doubt due to the presence of the large settlement, composed of the Stewarts, Watsons, Alexanders and Samuel Johnston and the industry that had been created. Many Trove documents and historical papers refer to the Weather, Births and Deaths being at Waterview giving evidence to the size of what is now North Bundaberg.

After aiding in the pioneering industry with his sawmill, he expanded his operations and pioneered the growing of corn. When the crops failed due to disease and pests Johnston turned his attention to the sugar industry in the Bundaberg district; he established a sugar mill and plantation, again carrying the Waterview name.

Many years after beginning in the Burnett region, and after the early settlements had expanded to the far north, he continued to show his enterprise by extending his interests to Port Douglas, becoming the owner of "Drumsara" (named after his place of birth), a sugar estate on the Mossman River.

He had four sons and eight daughters. Many of whom continued the pioneering Johnston spirit and became integral members of the community from the cape to the central coast.

== Career ==
Apart from designing and owning the Waterview sawmills, Samuel Johnston became the Chairman of the New Moonta Copper Mine (~80 km West of Bundaberg) and was also one of its Provisional Trustees.

== Waterview Estate ==
The first establishment in Waterview estate was the Waterview sawmill, which began operating on 29 December 1868. Samuel Johnston also started the Waterview sugar mill in the 1860s. By 1872, commercial production of sugar was in full swing at Waterview.

The Waterview saw mill was affected in the 1875 flood but was rebuilt. By 1888, the Waterview saw mill had 70 horsepower engines, two storeys, a planning room, 50 employees, and supplied Rockhampton as well as local lumber. As the mill prospered, the government extended the railway that linked North Bundaberg with Mount Perry eastward towards Waterview Mill.

The sawmill closed in 1903 after being destroyed by flood.

== Waterview Distillery ==
Samuel Johnston and Mr. Forshaw established the Waterview Distillery on 11 November 1892, immediately opposite the Millaquin Refinery. Waterview Distillery obtained molasses from the Waterview Sugar Refinery. The proximity of the distillery also made water carriage convenient, because the distillery was situated at a distance of not more than fifty yards from the river's edge, where every facility for shipping was present.

Waterview Distillery measured 100 feet in length by 30 feet in width. Mr. Forshaw manufactured the entire distilling plants, including improvements on the old process of distillation.

In 2013 another serial entrepreneur Matthew Drane re-established the Waterview brand and reintroduced the community to a large part of its missing heritage. Having now won over 45 Gold Awards including Worlds Best 3 Times for its Brandy as well as Rums and Mixed Drinks repeatedly among a dozen of the world's most well regarded Distilled Spirit. These awards pay homage to Samuel Johnston and his drive.
