= Fairymead Sugar Plantation =

Coordinates: 24.7898°S 152.3568°E

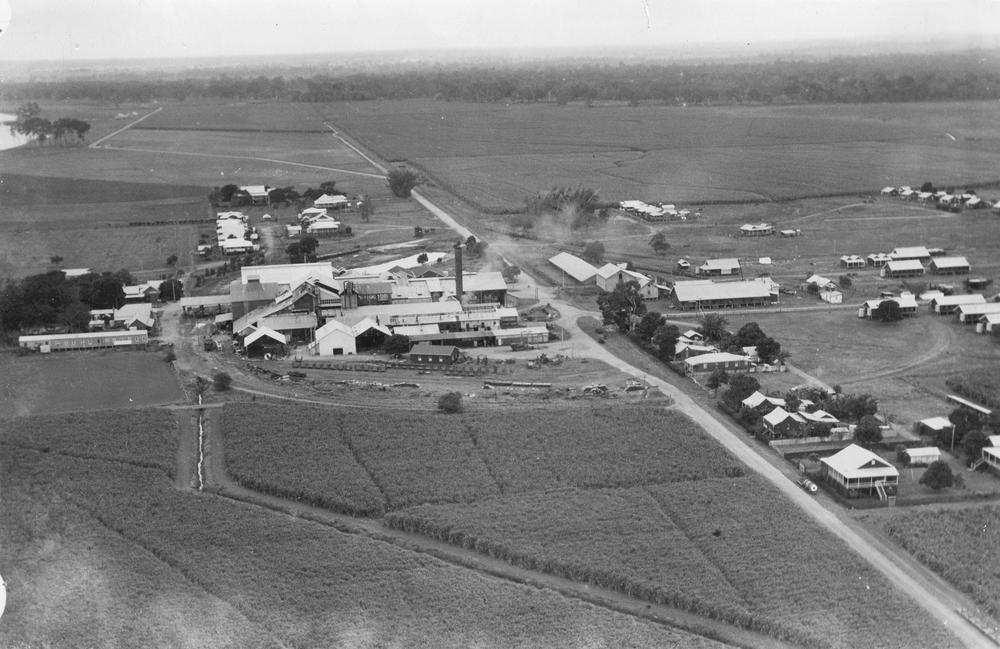
Fairymead sugar plantation and mill, 1935

Fairymead Sugar Plantation was a sugar plantation in Fairymead, Bundaberg Region, Queensland, Australia. It was established by Ernest Young together with his father Henry and brothers Arthur, and Horace. It was one of Bundaberg's earliest independent sugar plantations and had one of its earliest sugar mills.

== History ==
The origin of Bundaberg's sugar industry dates back more than 100 years to the introduction of the Sugar and Coffee Regulations Act 1864. Faced with the high cost of importing sugar from overseas, the Queensland Government wanted to find a way to encourage people to invest in sugarcane growing. The Sugar and Coffee Regulations Act 1864, was introduced into the Queensland Legislative Assembly by Charles Coxen, member for the Northern Downs. The proposed regulations of the Act permitted persons or companies to select land suitable for sugar in lots ranging from half a square mile to two square miles. The introduction of the Act brought about a renewed interest in sugar cane growing and people raced to accumulate land up and down the coast of Queensland.

The Brown brothers, Alfred and Arthur, were one of many who acquired land under the Sugar and Coffee Regulations Act 1864. In the early 1870s, the brothers acquired 13 square kilometres of land and developed the cattle property, Tantitha. Working under the Act the brothers divided up a central section of their property into three blocks, called Jamaica, Barbados and Mauritius and experimented with the growing of sugarcane. These subdivided sections later became known as Fairymead, after a friend of the family visited the plantation and described the place as being like a "fairy mead" on a misty morning. The Brown's abandoned their venture into sugar after the floods of 1875, which saw the land swamped and the cane trampled by cattle. They sold the 5 square miles of land devoted to sugarcane to the Young family in 1878.

Arthur and Horace Young, with their younger brother Ernest, began to transform Fairymead into a profitable state-of-the-art sugar plantation. Like many others who had heard of the potentially profitable sugar industry in Queensland's north, Arthur, Horace and Ernest had no knowledge of the sugar industry except their father's theoretical experience. They had formerly held two sheep stations in New Zealand, but when rabbits devastated these stations in 1878, the brothers began an eight-month search for another suitable investment. Their original intent was to investigate the pastoral possibilities in Australia but they were immediately won over by the possibility of a profitable sugar industry in Queensland.

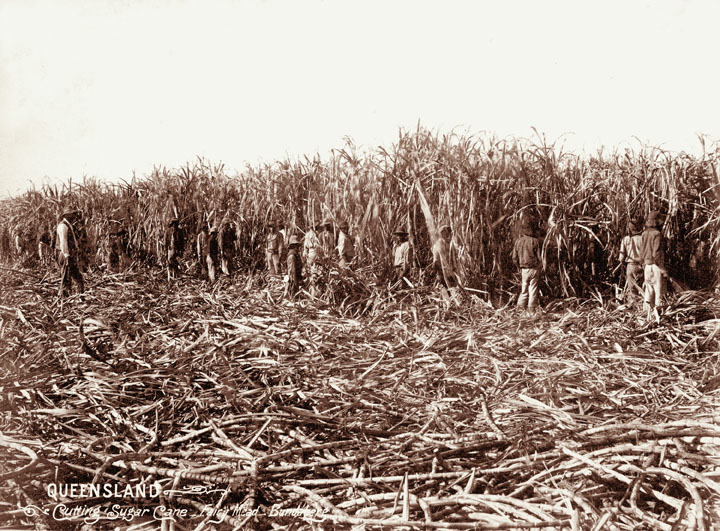
Cutting of the sugar cane at Fairymead, circa 1896

Arthur and Horace began operations at Fairymead in 1880, while Ernest went to England to acquire some necessary equipment for the plantation. By 1883 the rougher pioneering work was done and the first major crop harvested. For the first two years, the Young's punted the juice from their crops to Millaquin plantation and sugar refinery. In 1884 they installed a clarification unit and boiling plant, which enabled them to refine their own sugar as well as the sugar crops of smaller plantations in the Bundaberg region. By the end of 1884 cane from the Fairymead plantation, processed by their own mill, was producing 15 long tons (15 t) of sugar daily.

The Young brothers were also responsible for the introduction of a number of innovative cane harvesting and crushing techniques, many of which are still in use today. In setting up Fairymead Mill the Young brothers chose to install 81-centimetre (32 in) rollers imported from Glasgow to crush the cane instead of the standard 76-centimetre (30 in) rollers. They installed a Relieux furnace to improve processing efficiency of the raw juice and in c. 1882, they initiated the use of Fowler's tramway system to bring cane to the mill, introducing the now universal system of cane railways to the Bundaberg district. In 1902 the Young brothers established an irrigation system to help combat the effects of long periods of drought in the region and began working towards the mechanisation of the cane harvesting industry.

In 1938 the Young Brothers took their first step towards the mechanisation of cane harvesting by financing the development of a new single-row cane-cutting machine. This machine was a significant advance in cane-cutting technology, capable of cutting over 200 metric tons (200 long tons; 220 short tons) per day in straight cane. This investment paid off during the labour shortages of World War II. The rest of the district also benefited from Fairymead's reduced demand for cane cutters, who were made more available to service other sugar plantations in the region. Their second step was the development of the successful two-row cane-cutting machine. This machine was a post-war development thanks to the mechanical skills of Jim Vichie and the encouragement of Charles Young (son of Ernest and Margaret Young).

In 1972 Fairymead Sugar Company merged with Gibson and Howes Pty Limited to form the Bundaberg Sugar Company Limited. Milliquin Sugar Company Pty Limited became part of the group in 1975. In the 121 years since the first primitive sugar juice mill crushed the area's first successful cane crop, Fairymead and the sugar industry has played a major role in the development and prosperity of Bundaberg and surrounding district. Fairymead Sugar Plantation was one of Australia's largest cane farms.

Fairymead Sugar Mill closed in 2005, due to the mill sinking into the ground from the swamp like soil from the previous flood. Most of the buildings were taken down as safety hazards but some of the old mill still remains. The middle of the mill is now used as a loco shed to house trains used for collecting cane Around the old mill, to be bought up to the Bingara mill which still runs today.

== Fairymead House ==
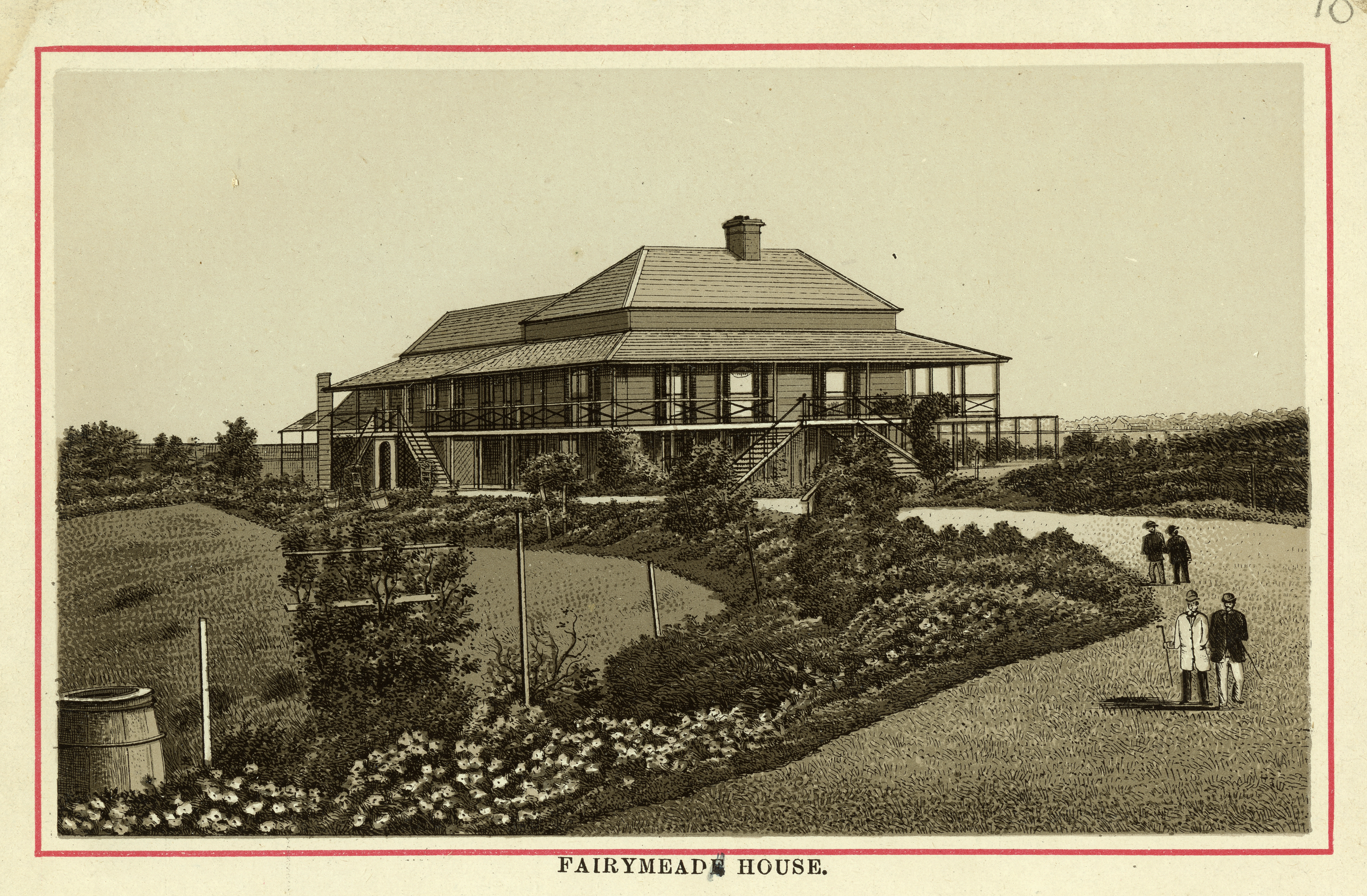
Fairymead House, circa 1894

Fairymead House, a grand plantation home, was built in 1890 on land adjacent to the plantation. It was the principal residence of Ernest and Margaret Young and other members of the Young family for over 60 years. It is a good example of the grandeur of plantation accommodation in the late 19th and early 20th century.

In 1988 the Bundaberg Sugar Company Ltd gave Fairymead House to the City of Bundaberg as a building of "significant historical importance to the district" and as the company's Bicentennial gift to the city. The Bundaberg City Council agreed to provide a site for the home and Fairymead was relocated to the city's Botanic Gardens on the corner of Young Street and Mt Perry Road. The house was listed on the Queensland Heritage Register in 2002.

== See also ==
- List of sugar mills in Queensland
- List of tramways in Queensland
