= Mon Repos =

Mon Repos or Monrepos (French for "my place of rest") may refer to:

== Places ==
- Mon Repos, Queensland, Australia
  - Mon Repos Conservation Park, a turtle rookery at Mon Repos
- Mon Repos, Saint Lucia, a village on the island of Saint Lucia
- Mon Repos, San Juan–Laventille, Trinidad and Tobago, a community on the outskirts of Port of Spain
- Mon Repos, San Fernando, Trinidad and Tobago, a neighbourhood of San Fernando
- Mon Repos, Demerara-Mahaica, Guyana, a suburb of Georgetown

=== Parks ===
- Monrepos Park, a landscape garden in Vyborg, Russia
- Parc de Mon Repos, a park in Lausanne, Switzerland

=== Buildings ===
- Mon Repos, Corfu, a villa and former royal estate on the island of Corfu
- Monrepos Palace, a water pavilion in Ludwigsburg, Germany
- Monrepos (archaeology), an archaeological research centre and museum in Germany
