= Hinkler (disambiguation) =

Hinkler may refer to:

- Bert Hinkler, an Australian aviator
  - Division of Hinkler, an Australian federal electorate in Queensland
  - Hinkler Hall of Aviation, an aviation museum in Bundaberg, Queensland
  - Hinkler Ibis, a monoplane built by Bert Hinkler
- Paul Hinkler, a prominent member of the Nazi Party
- Simon Hinkler, a British musician
