= Sir Anthony's Rest =

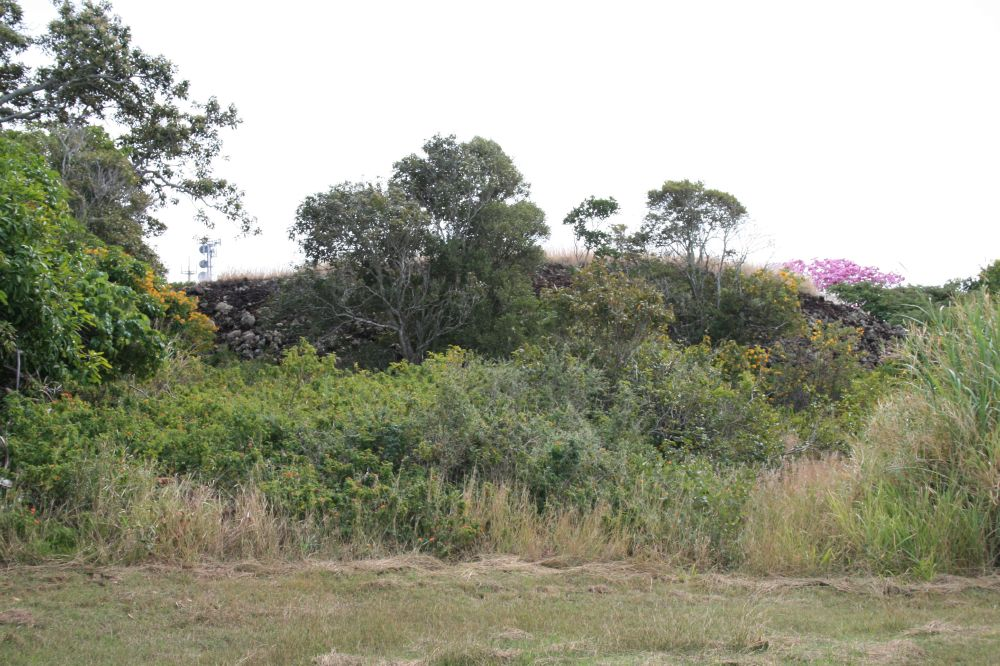
- Sir Anthony's Rest, 2009

- Location within Queensland Location within Australia
- 24.8454°S 152.4296°E
- Location: Sir Anthony's Rest Street, Qunaba, Bundaberg Region, Queensland, Australia

History
- Design period: 1870s–1890s (late 19th century)
- Built: 1888
- Built for: Vice-Regal visit

Queensland Heritage Register
- Official name: Sir Anthony's Rest
- Type: state heritage (built)
- Designated: 23 February 2001
- Reference no.: 602053
- Significant period: 1880s (fabric); 1880s (historical)

Sir Anthony's Rest is a heritage-listed dry-stone lookout at Sir Anthony's Rest Street, Qunaba, Bundaberg Region, Queensland, Australia. It was built for the official visit of the Governor of Queensland, Sir Anthony Musgrave, to Bundaberg in his 1888 tour of the area. It is located on the summit of the Bundaberg Hummock hill and provides a commanding view of the surrounding Bargara canefields.

It was added to the Queensland Heritage Register on 23 February 2001.

== History ==
A dry-stone rubble platform, known as Sir Anthony's Rest, was constructed during the visit of the Governor of Queensland, Sir Anthony Musgrave, to Bundaberg in his 1888 tour of the area. At this time Bundaberg was celebrating its 21st year of non-Indigenous settlement. Using South Sea Islander labour, William Gordon Farquhar of the Hummock plantation constructed a lookout for the Governor and his party facing east, with a view over the cane fields of the Shire of Woongarra. The area was part of the highest geographical point in the area, officially known as the Sloping Hummock but commonly known as simply "The Hummock" (24°50′33″S 152°25′35″E).

=== Sloping Hummock ===
From the deck of HMS Norfolk, Lieutenant Matthew Flinders took a bearing on a small volcanic outcrop, five kilometres to the south of Mon Repos beach. Flinders was surveying the waters between Great Sandy Island (Fraser Island) and the mainland. He named the outcrop the Sloping Hummock during his 1799 visit.

=== Sugar industry ===
Amongst the first of the sugar plantations in Bundaberg was Millaquin, established in 1882. It was joined in 1883 by the Hummock, Oakwood and Spring Hill plantations. WG Farquhar's 450-acre (182-hectare) block in the heart of the Woongarra was named the Hummock, as it took in part of the Woongarra's only landmark. By the end of 1882, Farquhar had 154 hectares of cane on the seaward slope of the Hummock, untouched by frost. In May 1883 Farquhar's juice mill machinery was delivered and in its enthusiasm the Sugar Planter described the rollers as measuring "60 feet by 30 feet", confusing feet with inches. The first crushing was made on Saturday 30 June 1883.

After one successful season, Farquhar sold to HJ Rhodes, a New South Wales capitalist. Farquhar visited Scotland, and his native Aberdeen, but returned to spend the rest of his life at the Hummock. Rhodes was soon in trouble, with drought and falling prices threatening to force him into insolvency, but both men carried on. Farquhar retained control, dying in 1909, aged 67, having seen the Hummock crush for the last time in 1893 when the plantation amalgamated with Nott Brothers' adjoining Windermere.

Farquhar, like most of the Woongarra farmers, barely made a living from maize growing. Although the soil was good and two crops per year could be obtained, the inundations of pests and disease, the expense and difficulties of transport, and the lack of a strong market, combined to erode farmers' profits. However, in the early 1880s the district was transformed following the construction of the Millaquin Sugar Refinery (1880–82) and the establishment of a viable sugar industry in the area. Small crushing or "juice" mills were erected on farms throughout the Woongarra, and the juice piped directly to the refinery, or if along the Burnett River, transported by punt. In the period 1882–84, 24 crushing mills were established in the Bundaberg district, most of them in the Woongarra Shire. By October 1882, when the Millaquin refinery went into production, crushing mills were operating at Ashgrove, Avoca, Fairymead, Glenmorris, Grange, Kepnock, Mabbro, Summerville, Windermere and Woodbine plantations. Seaview, Mon Repos and Sunnyside Plantations were established in 1884. Woodlands followed soon after. Sugar was embraced wholeheartedly by the Woongarra farmers, particularly when they could obtain cheap indentured labour from the South Sea Islands to help clear the scrub and work the cane fields.

South Sea Islanders had been working on other sugar plantations in the Bundaberg district from at least the mid-1870s. They were not brought directly to Bundaberg until 1879, but prior to this planters obtained Islanders via Maryborough, whose sugar industry had been established in the late 1860s.

=== Vice-Royal visit ===
It was during Farquhar's time at the Hummock that the Governor of Queensland, Sir Anthony Musgrave, undertook a northern tour and visited a number of towns, including Bundaberg. Musgrave was considered to be a very popular Governor, undertaking tours to the northern ports and inland towns in 1883, 1884, 1887 and 1888. Musgrave was keen to make himself acquainted with as large a portion of the colony as possible. In all the places visited, Musgrave was well received. Musgrave proclaimed the Woongarra Division in 1885.

Anthony Musgrave was born in Antigua, West Indies in 1828. Educated in the West Indies, Musgrave, became the Governor of South Australia in 1873. From 1877 to 1883 he was Governor of Jamaica. On 21 July 1883, he became Governor of Queensland. Musgrave left London on 22 September 1883 and arrived in Melbourne on 1 November 1883. Musgrave opened Queensland Parliament on 8 November 1883. With Samuel Griffith, who became Queensland Premier in November 1883, Musgrave shared a deep enthusiasm for Australian Federation. Musgrave visited England in June 1886 and planned to retire. In June 1888, Sir Thomas McIlwraith became premier. The two soon clashed over the governor's right to unfettered exercise of the prerogative of mercy. Musgrave appealed to the Colonial Office, McIlwraith defiled him and London supported the premier. A few weeks later, Musgrave died on 9 October 1888.

Musgrave was the sixth Governor of Queensland, in the position from November 1883 – October 1888. Making themselves visible and approachable to as many people as possible were key factors in obtaining and maintaining the Governor's popularity amongst the people. Musgrave covered considerable distances on tour and Lady Musgrave, intelligent and well-educated, often accompanied him on tour or held ladies' receptions. During the 1888 tour, Governor and Lady Musgrave visited Bundaberg on 30–31 May, Maryborough on 4 June and were in Gympie on 5 June. Musgrave's visit to Bundaberg had been the first official visit from a Governor of Queensland in ten years, since Governor Kennedy.

From the earliest days of colonial Queensland, governor's tours were more than familiarisation tours. They were both practical and ceremonial and received detailed coverage in the Queensland press. Tours encourage a sense of community within the places visited and was an opportunity to display progress made and to receive recognition for achievements. A vice-regal visit provided the chance to bring matters of local importance to the Governor's attention. The ceremonial and social aspects of governors' tours followed a similar pattern established in Britain during the late eighteenth century. Aspects included a reception by the local council, loyal addresses and the presentation of gifts and local curiosities. Visibility extended to eating in public. An interest in the welfare and progress of the people was demonstrated by laying foundation stones, taking an interest in children and performing ordinary activities in public. Following his welcome, the Governor was usually escorted into the town where he paused at the nearest official building, usually the court house, so that addresses of welcome could be made.

Musgrave and the Vice-Regal party arrived in Bundaberg on Wednesday, 30 May 1888, by the Government steamer Lucinda. On their first day, the party travelled to Millaquin Plantation and later drove around the town. Following a procession in Bundaberg on Thursday morning, the Vice-Regal party them headed out of the town. Lunch was taken at Mon Repos. One of the more unusual aspects of the tour was arranged for the Vice-Regal party was at the Hummock, Farquhar had fixed up a retreat at the highest available point. Here a booth, surrounded with basaltic boulders, had been constructed where refreshments were taken. The view from the booth was considered to be the finest in the district, overlooking the cane farms of the area. According to reports at the time, both the Governor and Lady Musgrave expressed delight at so picturesque a scene, and spoke approvingly of the general aspects of that portion of the district.

=== Construction ===
Farquhar's use of South Sea Islands labour probably dates from the establishment of the plantation in 1883. Most planters considered the use of South Sea Islanders for field work, especially clearing of stumps and rocks in preparation for planting, essential in establishing a successful sugar plantation. Where possible stones would be broken into convenient size for handling, loaded onto drays and carted to the farm boundary lines, and there built up as stone wall boundary fences averaging one and a half metres in height and just over one metre wide. Local tradition also records that wooden sleds, pulled by draught horses, followed around the paddocks as the land was being cleared. Rocks unearthed during this process were placed on the sled. Big rocks which would not fit on the sled would be broken up with spalling hammers. These pieces would then be placed on corn bags, an Islander on each corner, which would then be carried to the sled. When full, the sleds were taken to the end of the paddock where they were unloaded.

The construction of Sir Anthony's Rest is similar to the construction of the number of dry-rubble boundary walls which were constructed in the area using South Sea Islander labour (e.g. South Sea Islander Wall at Mon Repos). These walls were constructed in layers, with larger stones placed around the outside and smaller stones used for the infill. This seems to have been a common construction method in the Woongarra, but the origin of the technique has yet to be established.

Usually the crowds wishing to gain a view of the Vice-Regal party were large and often, there was no building in the town large enough to accommodate all those who wished to attend. Consequently, the erection of marquees was utilised. In Rockhampton, "a marquee of green branches" topped with the Royal coat of arms, was erected near the quay for the reading of speeches. Usually, structures specially assembled for visits by touring governors were temporary. The platform constructed for Sir Anthony's Vice-Regal party is rare as an example of a more permanent feature associated with a governor's tour.

== Description ==
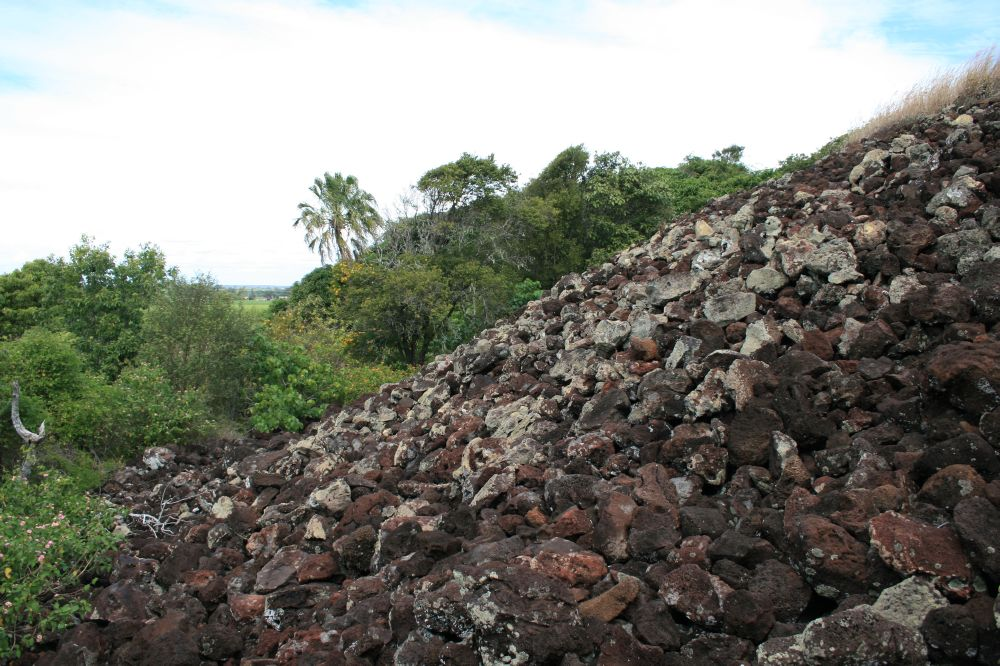
Sir Anthony's Rest and its dry rubble, 2009

Sir Anthony's Rest is located on a cane field in the area known as "The Hummock", approximately five kilometres east of Bundaberg. The Hummock is one of the area's most well known geographical landmarks.

The site provides an expansive view towards Bundaberg, the nearby town of Bargara and surrounding canefields, and consists of a dry rubble earth and stone platform, measuring approximately 4–5 metres (13–16 ft) high by 40 metres (130 ft) long and 35 metres (115 ft) wide. Located in the south-eastern corner of the property, the platform takes up approximately 0.1 hectare of the twenty hectare cane farm.

A large fig tree, mango trees and other mature vegetation are located to the north-east of the platform. There is no remaining evidence of the framed shelter constructed for the Vice-Regal visit.

The remainder of the property is planted with cane.

== Heritage listing ==
Sir Anthony's Rest was listed on the Queensland Heritage Register on 23 February 2001 having satisfied the following criteria.

The place is important in demonstrating the evolution or pattern of Queensland's history.

Sir Anthony's Rest is significant for its association with an important historical event, Governor Sir Anthony Musgrave's tour of the area in June 1888, during the development of the Bundaberg/Woongarra region.

The place demonstrates rare, uncommon or endangered aspects of Queensland's cultural heritage.

Sir Anthony's Rest is significant as a rare physical remnant of a governor's tour to an area, particularly as most shelters for visiting Vice-Regal parties were of a temporary nature.

The place is important because of its aesthetic significance.

Measuring approximate 40 metres (130 ft) long by 35 metres (115 ft) wide, and rising to a height of 4–5 metres (13–16 ft), Sir Anthony's Rest is significant for its landmark value, clearly visible from one section along the Bagara-Bundaberg Road.

The place has a strong or special association with a particular community or cultural group for social, cultural or spiritual reasons.

Importantly, Sir Anthony's Rest, has a strong association for the present local South Sea Islander community and the experiences of their ancestors in Queensland. Sir Anthony's Rest is significant for the strong social significance it holds for the residents of Bundaberg and the surrounding areas and is highly valued by the community. Sir Anthony's Rest was identified in the Burnett Shire Heritage Study.

The place has a special association with the life or work of a particular person, group or organisation of importance in Queensland's history.

Sir Anthony's Rest is significant for its association with the South Sea Islander community and the exploitation of this large workforce employed in the Bundaberg district, one of the most affluent sugar districts in the state, in the late 19th and early 20th centuries.
