= Bundaberg Hummock =

Mountain in Australia

Coordinates: 24°50′34.53″S 152°25′32.49″E

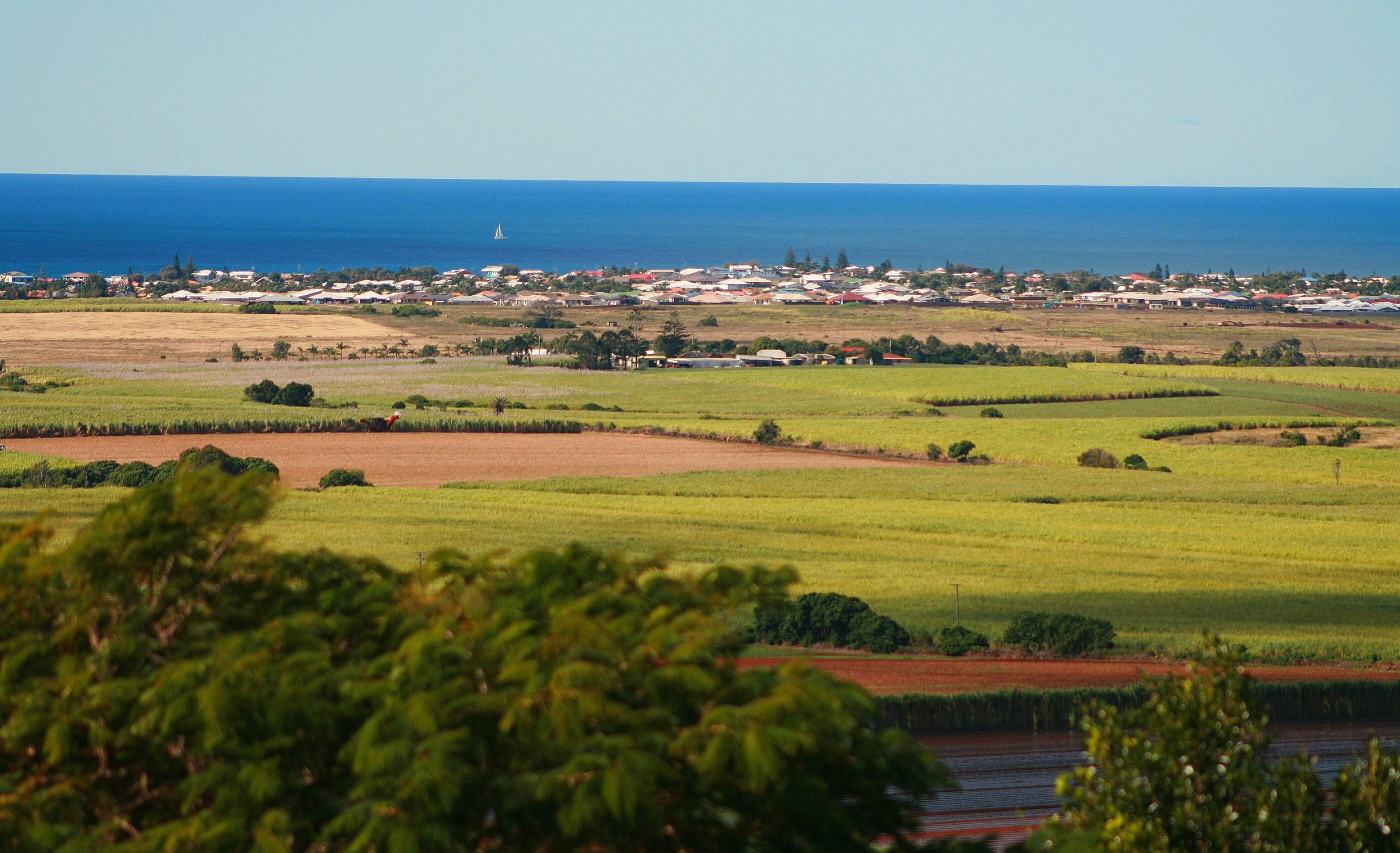
View from the Hummock towards Bargara

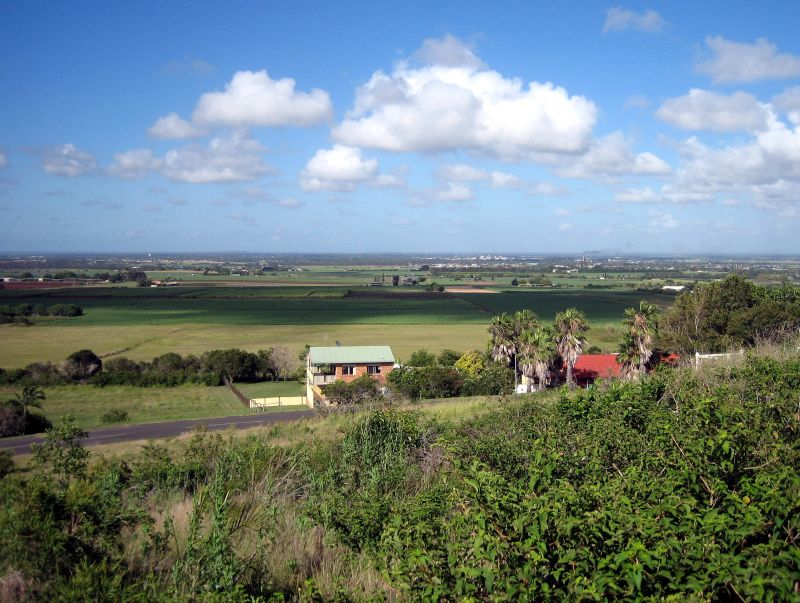
View from the Hummock towards the west

The Bundaberg Hummock, also referred to as The Hummock, is an extinct volcano remnant situated in the locality of Qunaba east of Bundaberg, Queensland, Australia. Its official (but rarely used) name is Sloping Hummock. The summit of the hill holds both a memorial to Bert Hinkler and the heritage listed Sir Anthony's Rest.

== History ==
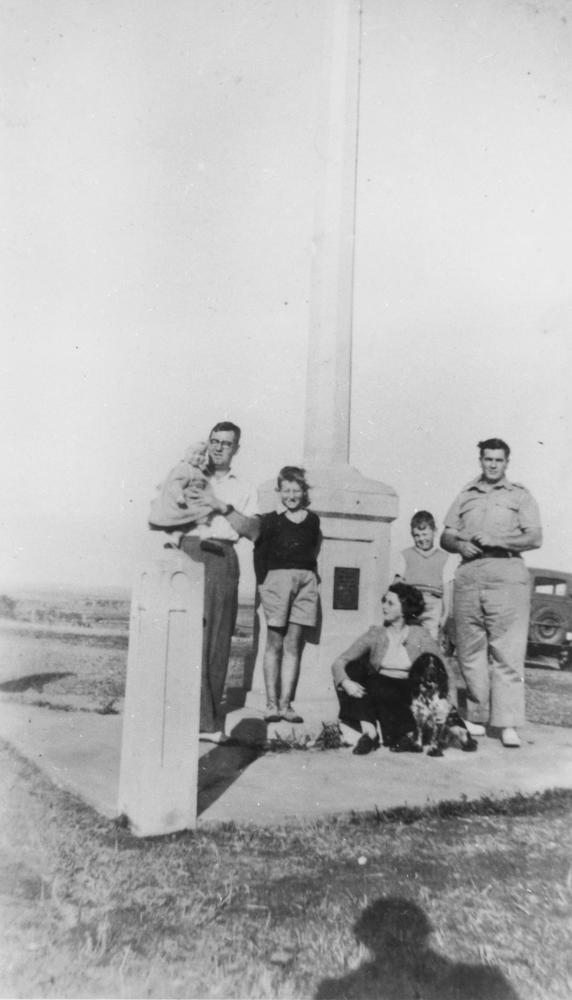
Hinkler memorial at the Hummock, 1947

From the deck of HMS Investigator, Lieutenant Matthew Flinders took a bearing on a small volcanic outcrop, five kilometres to the south of Mon Repos beach. Flinders was surveying the waters between Great Sandy Island (Fraser Island) and the mainland. He referred to it, but did not formally name the outcrop as the Sloping Hummock during his 1799 visit.

In 1930, the Bundaberg branch of the Royal Automobile Club of Queensland (RACQ) acquired the land at the top of the Hummock in order to create a park for motoring tourists to enjoy the views. The park was officially opened on 17 October 1931.

On 14 August 1937, the President of the RACQ unveiled a memorial to the Bundaberg-born aviator Bert Hinkler on the top of the Hummock.

== Geography ==
Qunaba is predominantly farming land, much of it used to grow sugarcane. It is mostly flat land with the exception of the Hummock which provides excellent views over the surrounding flat farmlands. The sides of the Hummock have attracted residential development to take advantage of the views. The fertility of the area is due to the volcanic soil from previous eruptions of the Hummock, which also left the local area scattered with volcanic rocks.

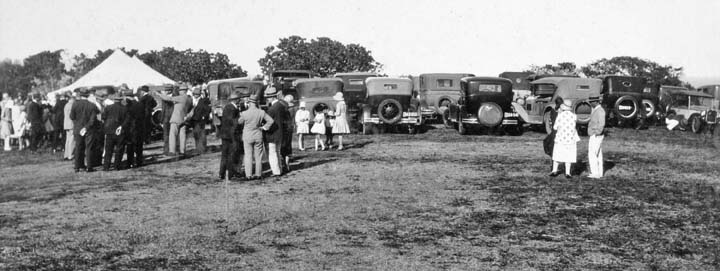
The official opening of the Hummock Lookout, 1931

== Heritage listing ==
The Hummock has been heritage listed as follows:

- Sir Anthony's Rest Street: Sir Anthony's Rest, a dry-stone rubble platform, constructed during the visit of the Governor of Queensland, Sir Anthony Musgrave, to Bundaberg in 1888
