= Maurice Guillaux =

French aviator

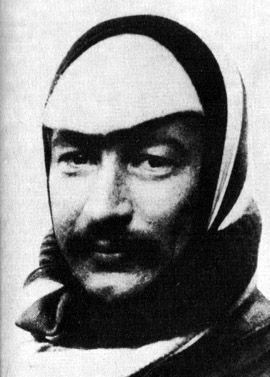
Maurice Guillaux

Ernest François Guillaux (24 January 1883 – 21 May 1917), better known by his adopted name Maurice Guillaux, was a French aviator who spent seven months in Australia in 1914. On 16–18 July 1914, he flew Australia's first air mail and air freight flight, from Melbourne to Sydney. During his time in Australia he also gave many aerial displays, was the first person to fly a seaplane in Australia, and was an early user of Ham Common, now RAAF Base Richmond.

== Early life ==
Ernest François Guillaux was born 24 January 1883 in Montoire, France. His father was a wheelwright, and he also worked in this trade; he married Héloïse Anne-Marie Langot, a farmer's daughter, in 1901. Little more is known about him until 1912, when he became well known as a pilot, using the name ‘Maurice’. Nelson Eustis, famous philatelist and amateur historian, made contact in 1964 with a son, Bernard, then about 62 years old.

== Career in France ==
On 19 February 1912, he obtained his pilot's licence, no 749. He became the chief pilot for the firm Caudron de Croty (Somme). From April onwards, he participated in many aviation displays. He was often able to fly in weather that was too severe for other pilots, but did crash on 29 April when his aircraft was caught by a strong wind gust at a display at Montoire. He flew, with a passenger, to England after this.

On his return, in August 1912 he became chief pilot for the Clément-Bayard organisation, flying its all-metal monoplanes made in their factory at Levallois-Perret. From time to time, he held various records, for example at Étampes, on 11 February 1913, when he flew 410 km in 4 hours 10 minutes with a passenger.

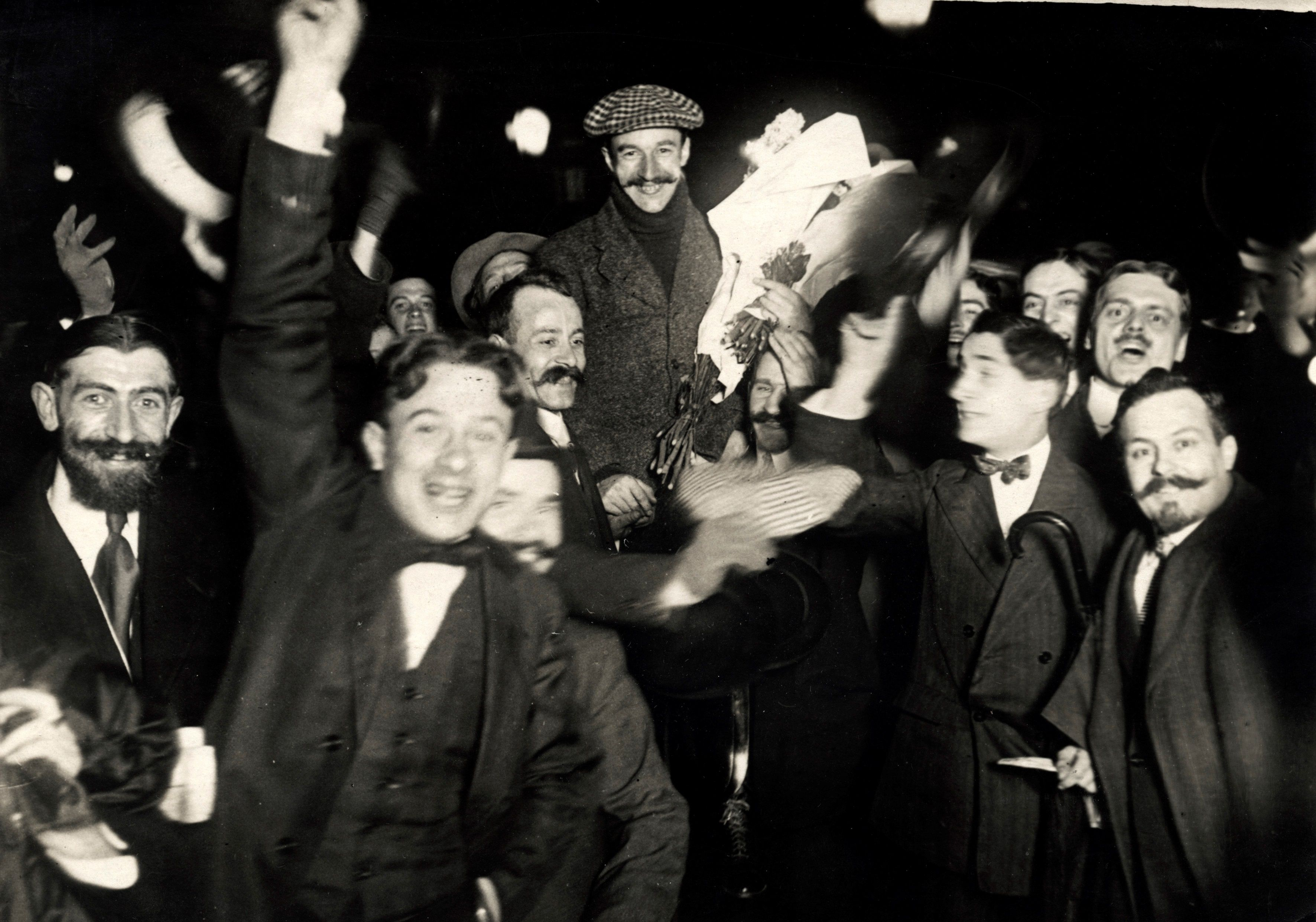
Guillaux after winning the 1913 Pommery Cup.

He also gained his military flying licence at about this time.

The Pommery Cup was awarded, twice a year, to the airman who flew the greatest distance, measured in a straight line, in one day. On 28 April Guillaux secured the prize by flying from Biarritz to Kollum in the Netherlands, a distance of 1 253 kilomètres. His main rival was Brindejonc des Moulinais.

In the next competition for the cup, Guillaux had an irregularity in his record-keeping, and as a result was suspended from competition for ten years. He then purchased a Bleriot XI aircraft, especially prepared for aerobatics, known as a ‘looper’ in which he performed during December and January.

With four companions, listed on the passenger manifest as Messrs Rupeausseu, Maistre, Cominos and du Coque, he then departed on a world tour.

== Arrival in Australia ==
The party arrived in Sydney early in April, and spent the first fortnight assembling the Bleriot. His first flying display was given at Victoria Park, Zetland, Sydney, on 19 April 1914, followed by a display at Newcastle on 25 April. He was immediately received in the highest circles of Australian society, being officially welcomed to Sydney by the Lord Mayor on 28 April.

During May and June he also performed in Melbourne, in regional centres such as Wagga Wagga, Albury, Bendigo, Ballarat, Geelong, and Bathurst and in Adelaide. These displays were hugely successful: hundreds of thousands of people paid to see him fly. He was received at Government House, Melbourne, and actually landed and took off from its grounds.

== Seaplane flights ==
Lebbeus Hordern, a member of the wealthy family which owned the Sydney department store Anthony Horderns, imported a Maurice Farman 'hydro-aeroplane' in 1914. It was the first seaplane in Australia. Its 70-horsepower Renault engine enabled a maximum speed of 60 miles-per-hour. Wingspan was about 57 feet, 17.3 metres, it was about 35 feet, 10.6 metres long, and weighed about 1680 pounds, 760 Kilograms. It could carry ‘two seventeen-stone passengers’ or three passengers of lesser weight.

Lebbeus Hordern enlisted the services of Guillaux and his team to assemble and test fly the aircraft, and on May 8, 1914, Maurice Guillaux flew the Farman for the first time. Over the next few days he made many flights carrying passengers including the owner of the aircraft and Miss Louise Carbasse, then a 19-year-old Australian actress. After the war, she became a well-known Hollywood actress under the name of Louise Lovely.

On 22 May, Guillaux and Lebbeus Hordern announced their intention to fly the seaplane from Sydney to Melbourne, but this flight was never attempted. Guillaux also announced his intention to remain permanently in Australia, making his home in Sydney. He had purchased some more aircraft that would arrive in about three months.

== Melbourne-Sydney mail flight ==
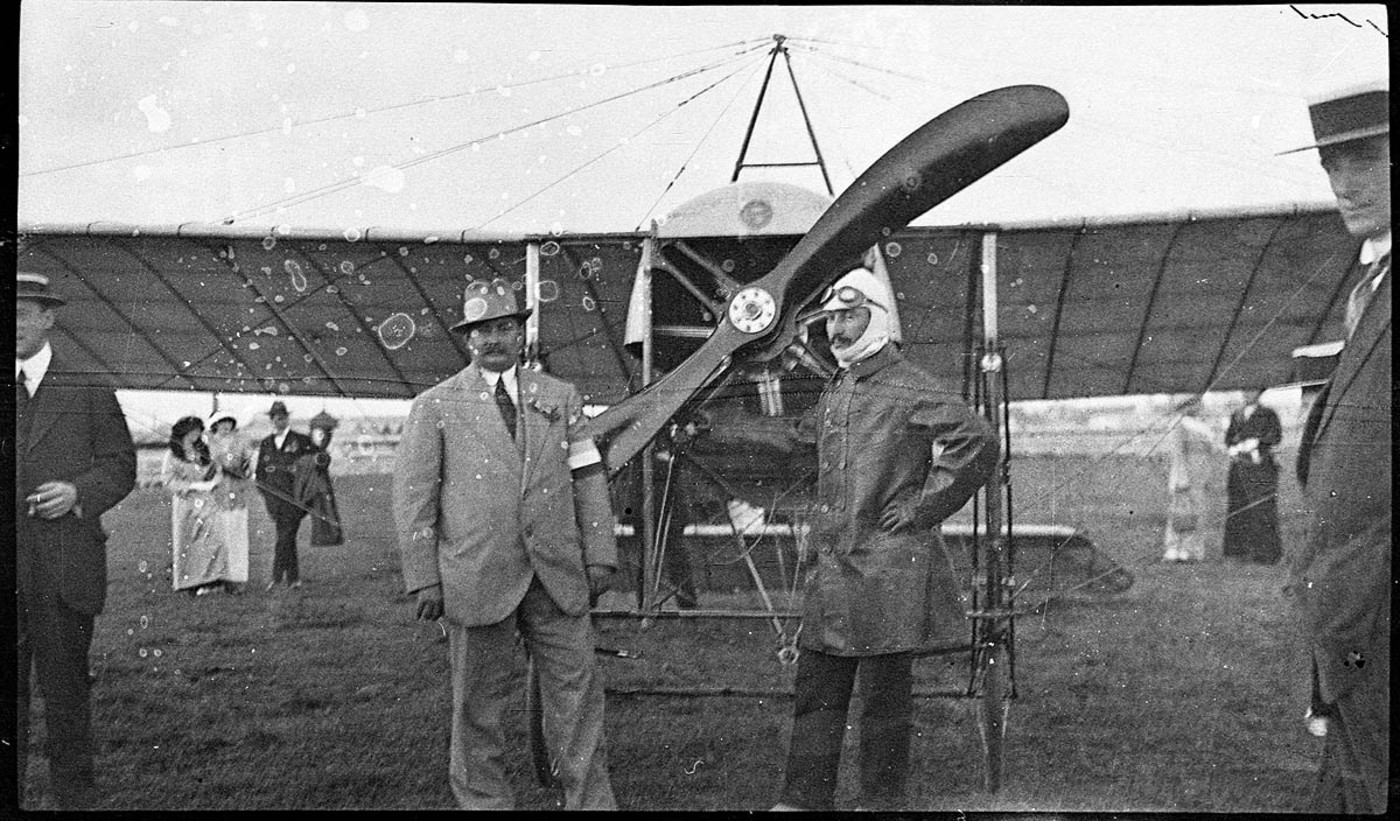
Guillaux and his Bleriot XI monoplane after the Melbourne-Sydney flight

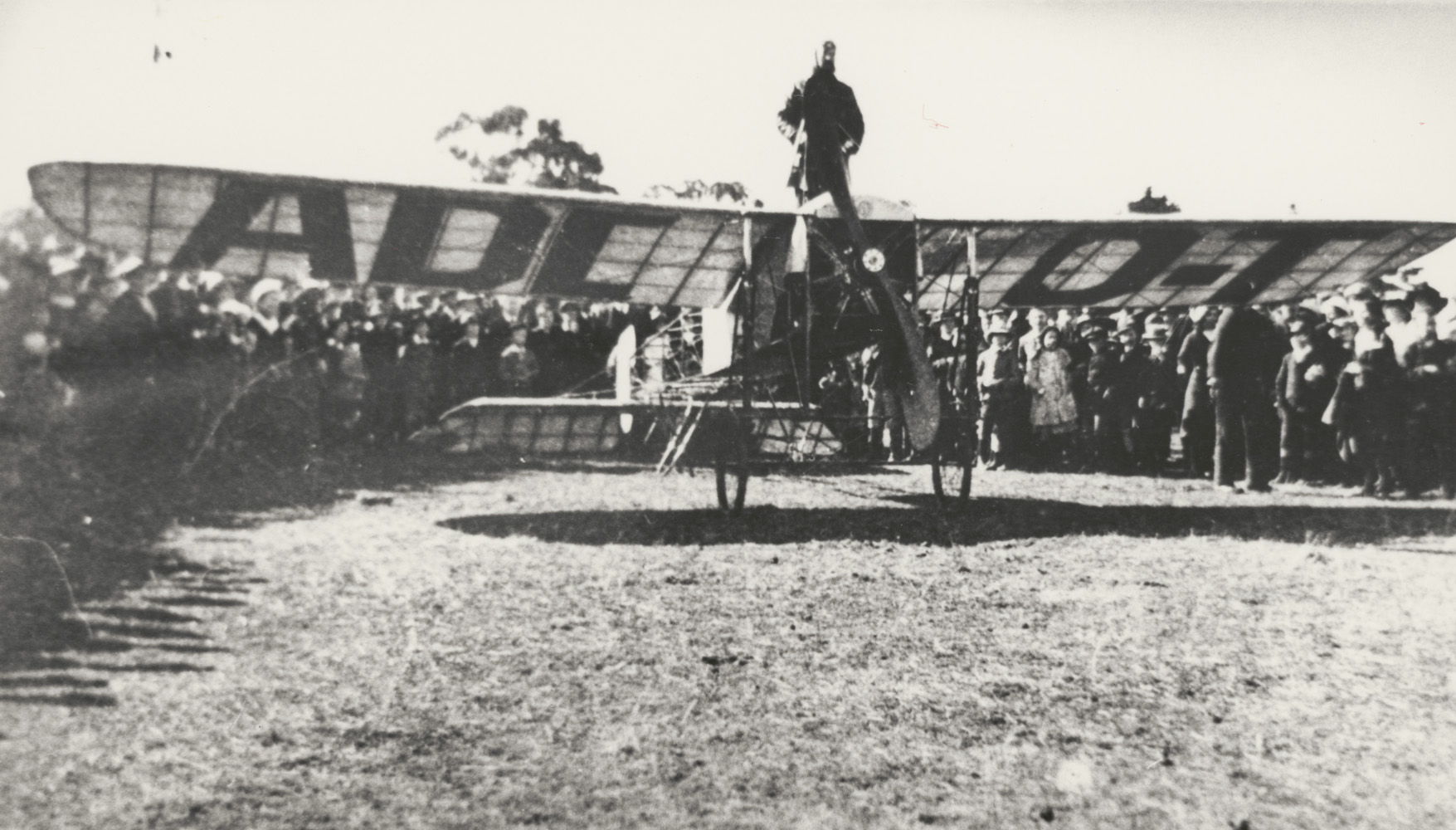
Guillaux standing on top of his plane at Wangaratta, partway through the trip

On May 13 the American aviator, Arthur 'Wizard' Stone, announced plans to fly mail from Melbourne to Sydney, with a flight date proposed 'on or about' 23 May. This was delayed until June 6, but on June 1 Stone crashed in Rockhampton, Queensland, while racing against an automobile. He was injured and his aircraft was badly damaged.

Guillaux took over the air mail project. He took off on his journey from Flemington showgrounds, Melbourne at 9:12 am on 16 July 1914, and landed in fields at Seymour and Wangaratta before entering New South Wales, reaching Albury racecourse at 12 50 pm. Here he had lunch with compatriot Alderman Georges Pierre Frere before flying on to Wagga Wagga and then to Harden at 4 06 pm. Trying to fly on, he was forced back by bad weather. In one day he had flown about 575 kilometres, giving aerobatic displays over each town to entertain the huge crowds that greeted him at every stop.

On 17 July he was again forced to return to Harden because of weather, but on 18 July he was able to move on to Goulburn. This was a freezing winter morning, for which Goulburn is infamous, and when he landed he rushed to the beacon fire to thaw out. He flew on, missing a planned landing at Moss Vale, but landing just behind the main street of Liverpool. After lunch with the locals, he took off in time to arrive at Moore Park, in central Sydney, by 2 50 pm.

Here he was received by a huge crowd, including the Governor-General. A band played the Marseillaise and he handed over his cargo. There were 1785 postcards and special messages such as those from the Governor and the French Consul in Victoria to their counterparts in New South Wales. A packet of Liptons Tea and some OT lemon cordial were also carried; this was Australia's first air freight. This was, at the time, the longest air mail flight anywhere in the world.

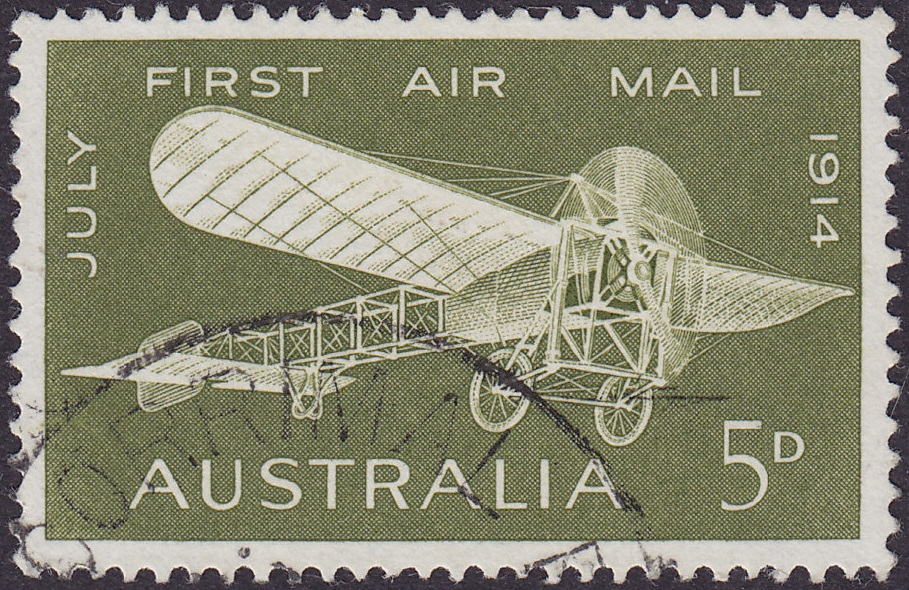
A 1964 Australian stamp dedicated to the 50th anniversary of the 1st Australian Airmail flight. Bleriot XI aircraft flown by Maurice Guillaux, 1914.

== After the air mail flight ==
The flight created a sensation. Huge marketing campaigns were begun by OT juice, by Liptons, and by the manufacturers of Guillaux’ thermos flask.

Guillaux continued to fly, and on August 1 had a serious crash at Ascot Racecourse, now part of Kingsford-Smith airport. He had recovered, and his aircraft had been repaired, by 18 September when he made the first flights from Ham Common, now part of Richmond RAAF base. He and Lebbeus Hordern had intended to expand their fleet and establish a major base here, but the outbreak of war had interrupted all their plans.

== Preservation of Guillaux’ aircraft ==
The Bleriot XI aircraft used by Maurice Guillaux is preserved in the PowerHouse Museum, Ultimo, Sydney.

== Return to France ==
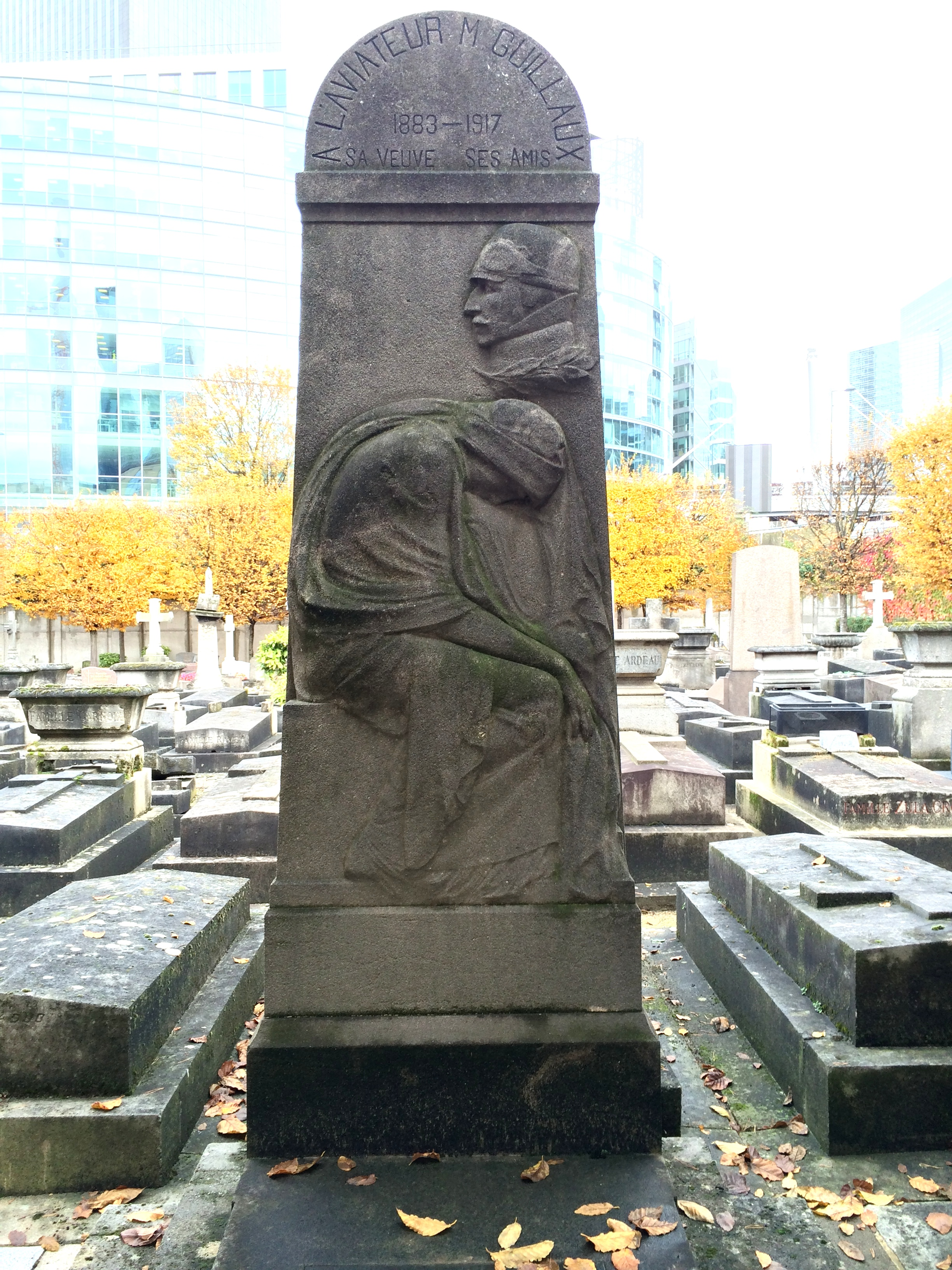
Tomb of Maurice Guillaux at the new cemetery of Neuilly-sur-Seine (Hauts-de-Seine). His gravestone is adorned with his portrait and a grieving woman.

Guillaux left for France on 22 October on SS Orvieto, listed on the embarkation roll as an aviator attached to the 1st Australian Division. Not much is presently known about his subsequent career with the Australian forces, but certainly by 1915 he was a test pilot in France.

== Death ==
Maurice Guillaux died when the prototype Morane-Saulnier aircraft that he was testing crashed at Villacoublay on 21 May 1917. He was buried at Neuilly-sur-Seine.
