= Qunaba, Queensland =

Qunaba
- Suburb
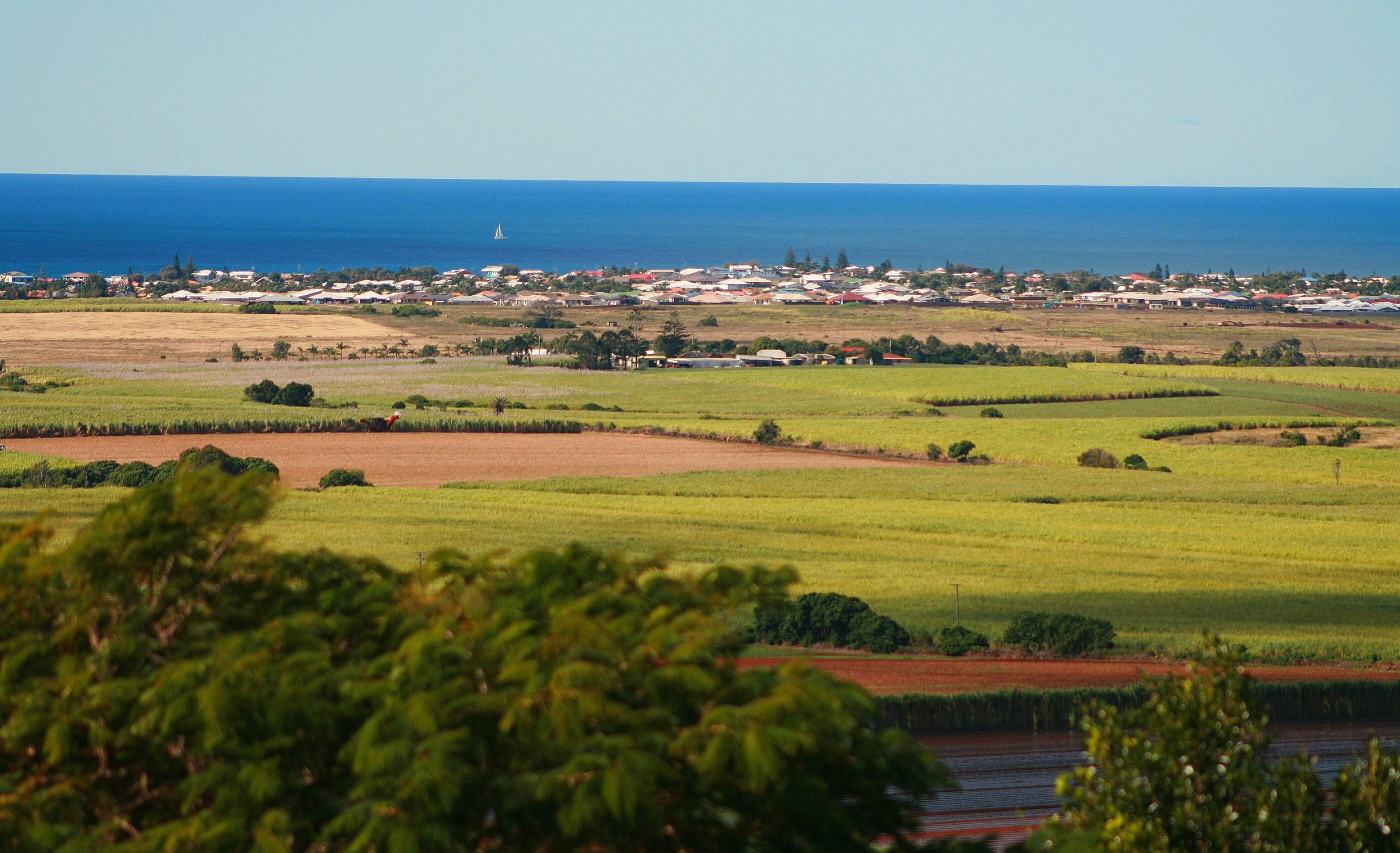
- Looking from The Hummock across the Qunaba sugar cane fields towards neighbouring Bargara and the Coral Sea, 2009

- Interactive map of Qunaba
- Coordinates: 24.8241°S 152.4302°E
- Country: Australia
- State: Queensland
- LGA: Bundaberg Region
- Location: 7.3 km (4.5 mi) ENE of Kepnock; 10.2 km (6.3 mi) ENE of Bundaberg Central; 366 km (227 mi) N of Brisbane

Government
  - State electorate: Burnett
  - Federal division: Hinkler

Area
  - Total: 17.4 km^{2} (6.7 sq mi)

Population
  - Total: 836 (2021 census)
  - Density: 48.05/km^{2} (124.4/sq mi)
- Time zone: UTC+10:00 (AEST)
- Postcode: 4670
Suburbs around Qunaba
Rubyanna	Burnett Heads	Mon Repos
Rubyanna	Qunaba	Bargara
Rubyanna	Windermere	Windermere

Qunaba is a rural locality in the Bundaberg Region, Queensland, Australia. In the 2021 census, Qunaba had a population of 836 people.

== Geography ==
Qunaba is predominantly farming land, much of it used to grow sugarcane. It is mostly flat land with the exception of the Sloping Hummock, commonly known as the Bundaberg Hummock or simply the Hummock (24°50′33″S 152°25′35″E) which provides excellent views over the surrounding flat farmlands. The sides of the Hummock have attracted residential development to take advantage of the views.

The Bundaberg-Bargara Road runs through from west to east.

== History ==
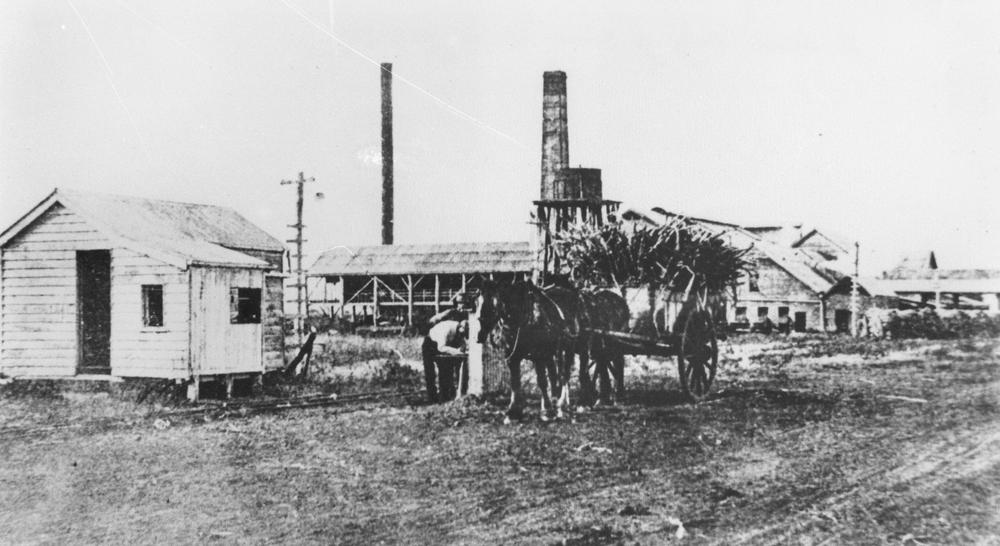
Horsedrawn cart at weighbridge in front of Qunaba Sugar Mill, 1909

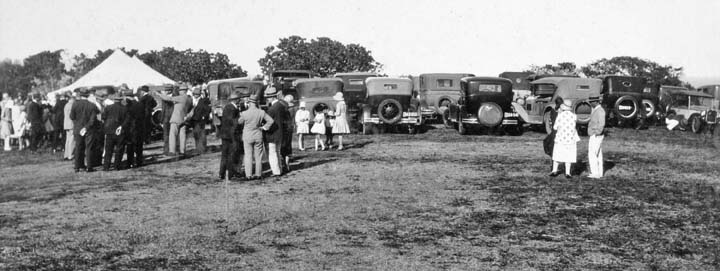
The official opening of The Hummock Lookout, 1931

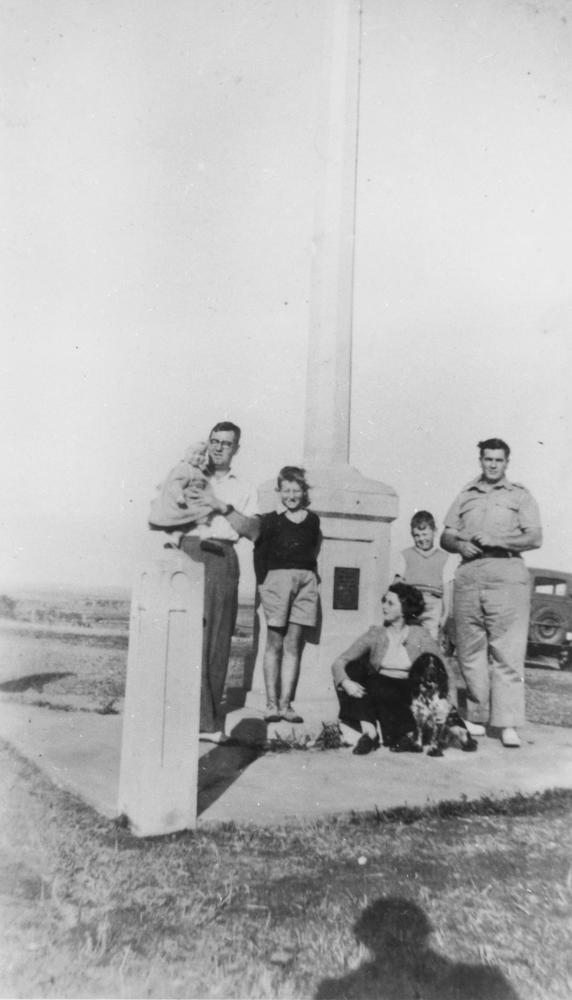
Hinkler Memorial on the Hummock, 1947

Qunaba takes its name from the Qunaba sugar plantation and mill. Originally established as the Mon Repos plantation and mill, it was taken over in 1900 by the Queensland National Bank who renamed it Qunaba (coined from QUeensland NAtional BAnk).

In 1930, the Bundaberg branch of the Royal Automobile Club of Queensland (RACQ) acquired the land at the top of the Hummock in order to create a park for motoring tourists to enjoy the views. The park was officially opened on 17 October 1931.

On 14 August 1937, the President of the RACQ unveiled a memorial to the Bundaberg-born aviator Bert Hinkler on the top of the Hummock.

== Demographics ==
In the 2011 census, Qunaba had a population of 822 people.

In the 2016 census, Qunaba had a population of 793 people.

In the 2021 census, Qunaba had a population of 836 people.

== Heritage listings ==
Qunaba has the following heritage listings:

- Sir Anthony's Rest Street: Sir Anthony's Rest, a dry-stone rubble platform, constructed during the visit of the Governor of Queensland, Sir Anthony Musgrave, to Bundaberg in 1888

== Education ==
There are no schools in Qunanba. The nearest government primary schools are Bargara State School in neighbouring Mon Repos to the north-east, Kalkie State School in Kalkie to the south-west, and Burnett Heads State School in neighbouring Burnett Heads to the north. The nearest government secondary school is Kepnock State High School in Kepnock to the south-west.

== Amenities ==
There are a number of parks in the locality, including:

- Heathwood Park (24.8426°S 152.4257°E)
- Hilltop Drive Road Park (24.8447°S 152.4224°E)
- Turners Way Park (24.8455°S 152.4261°E)

== Attractions ==
The Hummock Lookout is on Turners Way (24.8454°S 152.4260°E).

== See also ==
- List of tramways in Queensland
