= South Sea Islander Wall =

Heritage plantation in Queensland, Australia

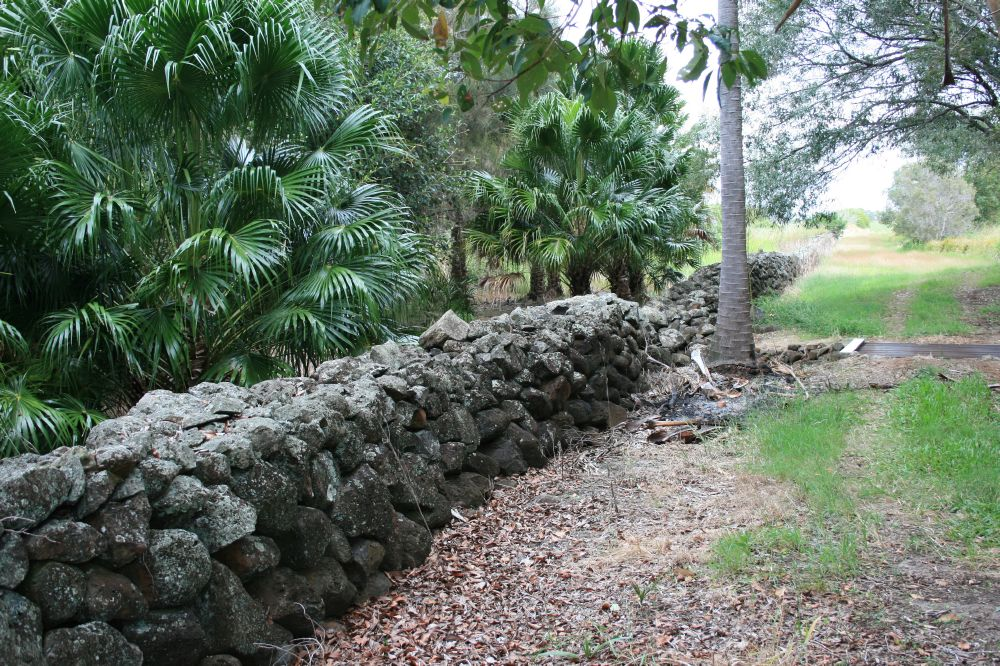
- South Sea Islander Wall, 2009

- Location within Queensland Location within Australia
- 24.8016°S 152.4381°E
- Location: Grange Road, Mon Repos, Bundaberg Region, Queensland, Australia

History
- Design period: 1870s - 1890s (late 19th century)
- Built: circa 1884

Queensland Heritage Register
- Official name: South Sea Islander Wall
- Type: state heritage (built)
- Designated: 1 October 2001
- Reference no.: 602230
- Significant period: 1880s (fabric); 1880s-1900s early (historical)
- Builders: South Sea Islander labour

South Sea Islander Wall is a heritage-listed plantation at Grange Road, Mon Repos, Bundaberg Region, Queensland, Australia. It was built circa 1884 by South Sea Islander labour. It was added to the Queensland Heritage Register on 1 October 2001.

== History ==
The South Sea Islander Wall at Mon Repos was constructed in the c. 1884 probably using South Sea Islander labour.

Mon Repos Sugar Plantation was established in 1884. By 1887 Mon Repos was Millaquin Refinery's major juice supplier. A relative latecomer to Bundaberg's sugar boom, Mon Repos Plantation was owned by Augustus Purling Barton. Barton was born into upper class English society in 1834 and arrived in Melbourne in 1855. In 1863 Barton had taken up Moolboolaman station in the Kolan district. Barton led the life of a squatter for about twenty years. Then, in the early 1880s, he acquired a stake in the Woongarra district. He constructed a large home which he intended as a coastal retreat or town house, where his family could get away occasionally from station life. He named the home "Mon Repos" (French for 'My Rest').

The first cane from Mon Repos plantation was harvested in 1882 and crushed at neighbouring mills. By 1884, Barton was operating his own juice mill. Over the years, he expanded his plant. During 1886, Barton had acquired Drynie, a small mill in the Burdekin district and re-erected it with additions in the Woongarra. Mon Repos plantation soon absorbed its neighbour Duncraggan. In 1887, Barton's juice mill was one of Millaquin refinery's major suppliers of juice. Mon Repos juice mill was converted to a complete sugar mill in 1887–88 and Barton continued to expand. Summerville mill and plantation were acquired in 1892, with the mill closing and the cane from the plantation crushed at Mon Repos. Two years later, Barton absorbed The Grange plantation.

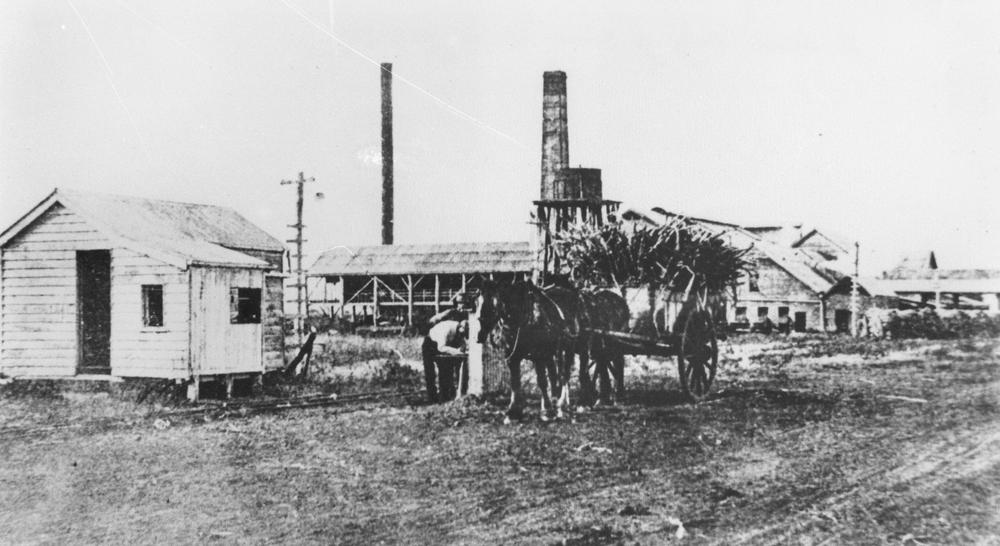
Horsedrawn cart at weighbridge in front of Qunaba Sugar Mill, 1909

In 1896, the Queensland National Bank gained control over the Millaquin refinery. In 1899, the negotiations began between Barton and the Queensland National Bank, an agreement was reached, and the Bank purchased Mon Repos mill and plantation. The name Mon Repos was changed to Qunaba (from QUeensland NAtional BAnk). Bundaberg Sugar Pty still owns a parcel of land on which the wall is located.

Barton was very much in favour of using South Sea Islander labour. The Woongarra area was covered with rocks, which were gathered and stone walls built around the cane fields. South Sea Islanders had been working on other sugar plantations in the Bundaberg district from at least the mid-1870s. They were not brought directly to Bundaberg until 1879, but prior to this planters obtained Islanders via Maryborough, whose sugar industry had been established in the late 1860s.

Herbert Turner later wrote of the work of South Sea Islanders in clearing the land on Woongarra farms:

. . . a large portion of the Woongarra land contained more or less loose rocks. After the tree stumps had been collected in heaps and burnt, the next job was to deal with the stones. Where possible they would be broken into convenient size for handling, loaded onto drays, and carted to the farm boundary lines, and there built up as stone wall boundary fences averaging five feet in height and four feet in width. A number of these stone walls are still in existence. The large stones would either be drilled and blasted with dynamite to a convenient handling size, or snigged by horse team to the boundary line.

Local tradition also records that:

Wooden sleds, pulled by draught horses, followed around the paddocks as the land was being cleared. Rocks unearthed during this process were placed on the sled. Big rocks which would not fit on the sled would be broken up with spalling hammers. These pieces would then be placed on corn bags, an Islander on each corner, which would then be carried to the sled. When full, the sleds were taken to the end of the paddock where they were unloaded.

The dry-rubble boundary walls were constructed in layers, with larger stones placed around the outside and smaller stones used for the infill. This seems to have been a common construction method in the Woongarra, but the origin of the technique has yet to be established.

== Description ==
The South Sea Islander Wall at Mon Repos, is approximately 1,580 metres (5,180 ft) in length, of which 307 metres (1,007 ft) is within the Mon Repos Conservation Park. Approximately 20 metres (66 ft) of the eastern or seaward end of the wall has been covered by drifting sand. A gap of 88 metres (289 ft) exists in the wall near its midpoint, with no obvious evidence that a wall previously existed in the area.

The wall has an average height of approximately 1.4 metres (4 ft 7 in), an average width of approximately 1.8 metres (5 ft 11 in) at the base and an average width of approximately 1.2 metres (3 ft 11 in) at the top surface.

The wall is of similar construction to that at the former Sunnyside Sugar Plantation on Windermere Road. There are believed to be only 6 similarly intact dry-rubble walls surviving in the Bundaberg district, of which the Mon Repos wall is a good example.

== Heritage listing ==
The South Sea Islander Wall was listed on the Queensland Heritage Register on 1 October 2001 having satisfied the following criteria.

The place is important in demonstrating the evolution or pattern of Queensland's history.

The South-Sea Islander Wall survives as important evidence of the enormous contribution made by South Sea Islanders to the establishment of a viable sugar industry in Queensland. In particular, it remains as testament to their contribution to the development of the sugar industry in the Bundaberg region, one of the most affluent sugar districts in the state. The wall is also important physical evidence of the manual nature of this contribution, for without the availability of indentured labour, Woongarra Scrub farmers could not have converted their lands to an activity as initially labour-intensive as sugar growing.

The place demonstrates rare, uncommon or endangered aspects of Queensland's cultural heritage.

The boundary wall, which is over one and a half kilometres metres in length, survives as one of the longest, most intact examples of its type in the Bundaberg district, which around the turn-of-the-century was chequered with such structures. Further, the South Sea Islander Wall, Mon Repos is significant for its rarity.

The place has potential to yield information that will contribute to an understanding of Queensland's history.

The place is significant also for its potential to contribute to further study, and better understanding, of the role of South Sea Islanders in Queensland history.

The place is important in demonstrating the principal characteristics of a particular class of cultural places.

Although diminished in length, what survives is substantially intact, and provides a good example of dry-rubble wall construction employed in the Bundaberg district in the late 19th century.

The place has a strong or special association with a particular community or cultural group for social, cultural or spiritual reasons.

Importantly, it has a strong association for the present local South Sea Islander community with the experiences of their ancestors in Queensland.

The place has a special association with the life or work of a particular person, group or organisation of importance in Queensland's history.

The place has an important association with the exploitation of the large South Sea Islands workforce employed in the Bundaberg district in the late 19th and early 20th centuries.
