= Hinkler Ibis =

General information
- Type: Two-seat monoplane
- National origin: United Kingdom
- Designer: H. J. Hinkler
- Number built: 1

History
- First flight: 1930
- Retired: 1959

The Hinkler Ibis was a British two-seat wooden amphibian monoplane designed and built by the Australian aviator Bert Hinkler while working in the United Kingdom.

== Design and development ==
Hinkler designed and built the Ibis with the assistance of R.H. Bound at Hamble Aerodrome in Hampshire. The wing was designed by Basil Henderson and built by Hendy Aircraft at Shoreham Airport. It was a two-seat high-wing monoplane made of wood and powered by two 40 hp (30 kW) Salmson AD.9 radials. The two engines were strut mounted back-to-back above the fuselage, one driving a pusher propeller, the other a tractor propeller. The Ibis registered G-AAIS was first flown from Hamble in May 1930 and later stored in the garden of Hinkler's house in Southampton. According to the aircraft's registration with the Civil Aviation Authority, it was deregistered in December 1933. In 1953, it was found in a semi-derelict condition in the garden but was scrapped in 1959.
