= Arthur Burr Stone =

American aviation pioneer

Arthur Burr Stone (1874–1943) also known as A. B. Stone, "Wizard" Stone and "Aviator" Stone, was an American aviation pioneer.

== Biography ==
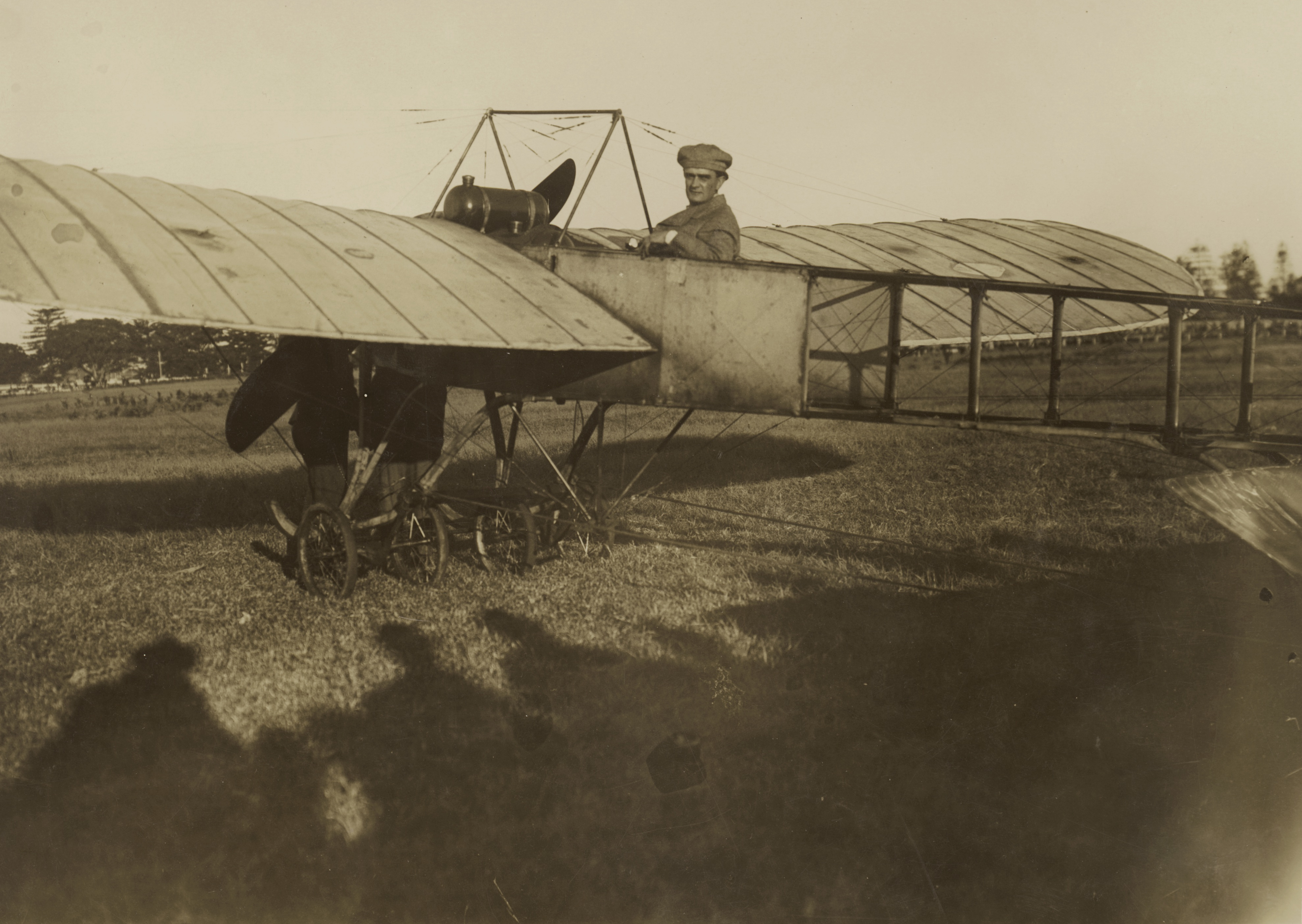
American pioneer aviator Arthur ‘Wizard’ Stone in a Blériot monoplane, Australia, 1912, gelatin silver print, State Library of New South Wales.

Arthur Burr Stone was born in 1874.

On 17 August 1911 at an aviation meet in Chicago, Stone's plane crashed into Lake Michigan from a height of 1,000 feet. Stone leapt from the plane before impact. By his own account: "I held my hand over my face and stood up in the cock pit," as he jumped. He spent half an hour in the water before being rescued.

Stone was test pilot for the Queen Aircraft Company.

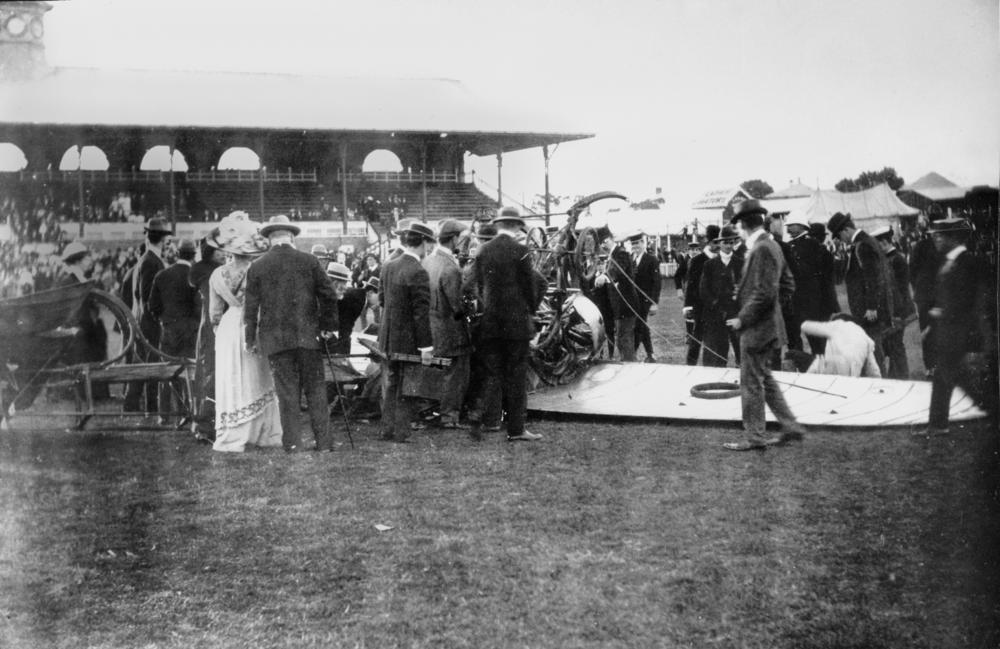
Arthur Burr (Wizard) Stone's Bleriot crashed upon landing, July 1912 Arthur Burr (Wizard) Stone's Bleriot crashed upon landing before a crowd at the Brisbane Exhibition Grounds, 6 July 1912.

In 1912 Stone went to Australia and flew his Bleriot monoplane in exhibitions. On 6 July he became to first person to fly in Brisbane - in front of 8,000 spectators at the Brisbane Exhibition grounds. Bert Hinkler became his mechanic. Stone was also a motorcycle globe-of-death rider. Stone toured New Zealand, and flew at Auckland Domain on 19 April 1913, where the "aircraft made a forced landing after 400 yards; it and the pilot were attacked by members of the disgruntled crowd who felt they had not got their money’s worth."

Stone was in Hamilton on May 12, then on 4 June the monoplane was "written off by a fence on the boundary of Napier's racecourse."

Stone was earmarked to carry the first Government official airmail from Melbourne to Sydney on 23 May 1914. Five days before the scheduled flight, the American barnstormer, while test flying his Metz-Bleriot at Sunshine, Victoria, suffered a mishap and damaged the plane. The flight was cancelled and the mail was carried to Sydney by rail.

He died in 1943.

== Anecdotes ==
1913: "Leslie and Claude Couper were coming in to take over this bush farm on Oio Road No. 2 in 1913. The road only came over the hill, Kaitieke side, for about a mile and from there on it was just a track. They were coming down the hill through the bush, winding in and out through the bush with their pack horses (jogging quietly) along when they heard an engine overhead just like a motor bike coming but it was an aeroplane, the first (the very first) to fly from the North down to Marton. The pack horses stampeded and bolted - they hadn't heard the like before and of course a bolting pack horse soon loses its pack. That was strewn every-where. A crow bar here, something else there and a stream of ammunition all down the track. But most important of all - the plane arrived at its destination."
