= Bert Hinkler =

Australian aviator (1892–1933)

Bert Hinkler AFC DSM
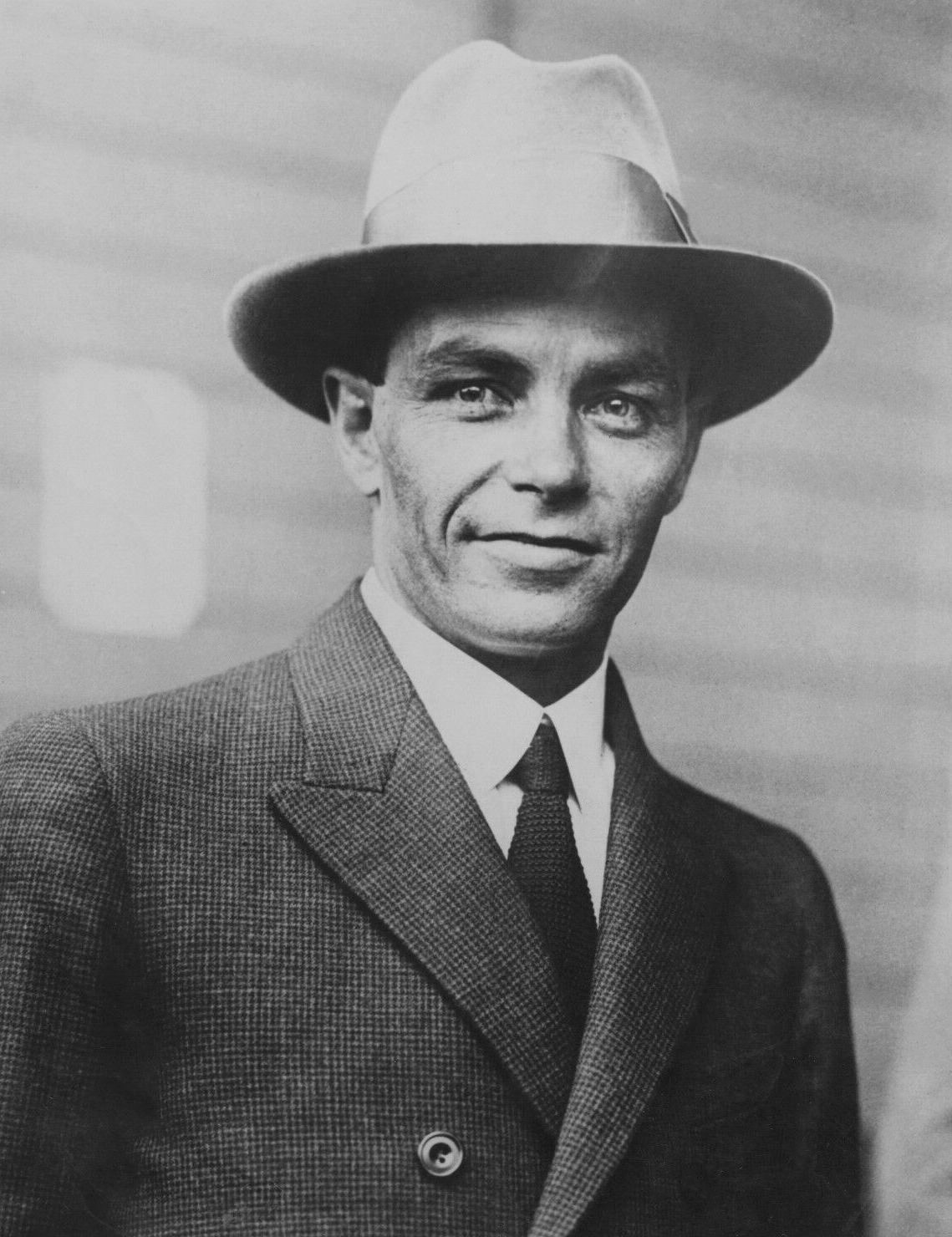
- Hinkler, c. 1928
- Born: Herbert John Louis Hinkler; 8 December 1892; Bundaberg, Queensland, Australia
- Died: 7 January 1933 (aged 40); Pratomagno Alps, Italy
- Occupations: Aviator, inventor
- Spouse(s): Hannah (Nance) Jarvis (de facto, 1920s–33 Katherine Rose (m. 1932)
- Awards: Distinguished Service Medal (1917); Britannia Trophy (1920, 1928, 1931); Air Force Cross (1928); FAI Gold Air Medal (1928); Segrave Trophy (1931)

Herbert John Louis Hinkler (8 December 1892 – 7 January 1933) was a pioneer Australian aviator (dubbed "Australian Lone Eagle") and inventor. He designed and built early aircraft before being the first person to fly solo from England to Australia, completed on 22 February 1928, and the first person to fly solo across the Southern Atlantic Ocean. He married in 1932 at the age of 39, and died less than a year later after crashing into remote countryside near Arezzo, Tuscany, Italy, during a solo flight record attempt. He is considered to be one of the great aviators in history.

== Early life ==
Hinkler was born in Bundaberg, Queensland, the son of John William Hinkler, a Prussian-born stockman, and his wife Frances Atkins (née Bonney) Hinkler. In his childhood, Hinkler would observe ibis flying near a lake at his school. After gaining an understanding of the principles of flight, he constructed two gliders. In 1912 he launched one of his first home-made gliders on Mon Repos Beach and flew 10 metres (33 ft) above the sand dunes.

He later met Arthur Burr Stone at a travelling show in Bundaberg and again at the Brisbane Exhibition where Hinkler worked with Stone to solve a problem with the "Blériot", the world's first monoplane. In 1913, Hinkler went to England where he worked for the Sopwith Aviation Company, the beginning of his career in aviation.

== World War I ==
During the First World War, Hinkler served with the Royal Naval Air Service as a gunner/observer in Belgium and France, for which he was awarded the Distinguished Service Medal. In 1918 Hinkler was posted to No. 28 Squadron RAF with which he served as a pilot in Italy.

Hinkler was an "exceptional mathematician and inventor" and "made a lot of aviation instruments which were in use up until the Second World War." For example, "one was a gadget to correct drift as airplanes fly a little bit on their side, not straight ahead." Furthermore, "in WWI, Hinkler invented a machine gun adaptor for air gunners. Back then, when the biplanes were flying upside down in combat, the hot, ejected shells would fall and burn the chest of the gunners as they fired. Hinkler's invention had the ejected shells all flying off to one side instead."

== Later life and career ==
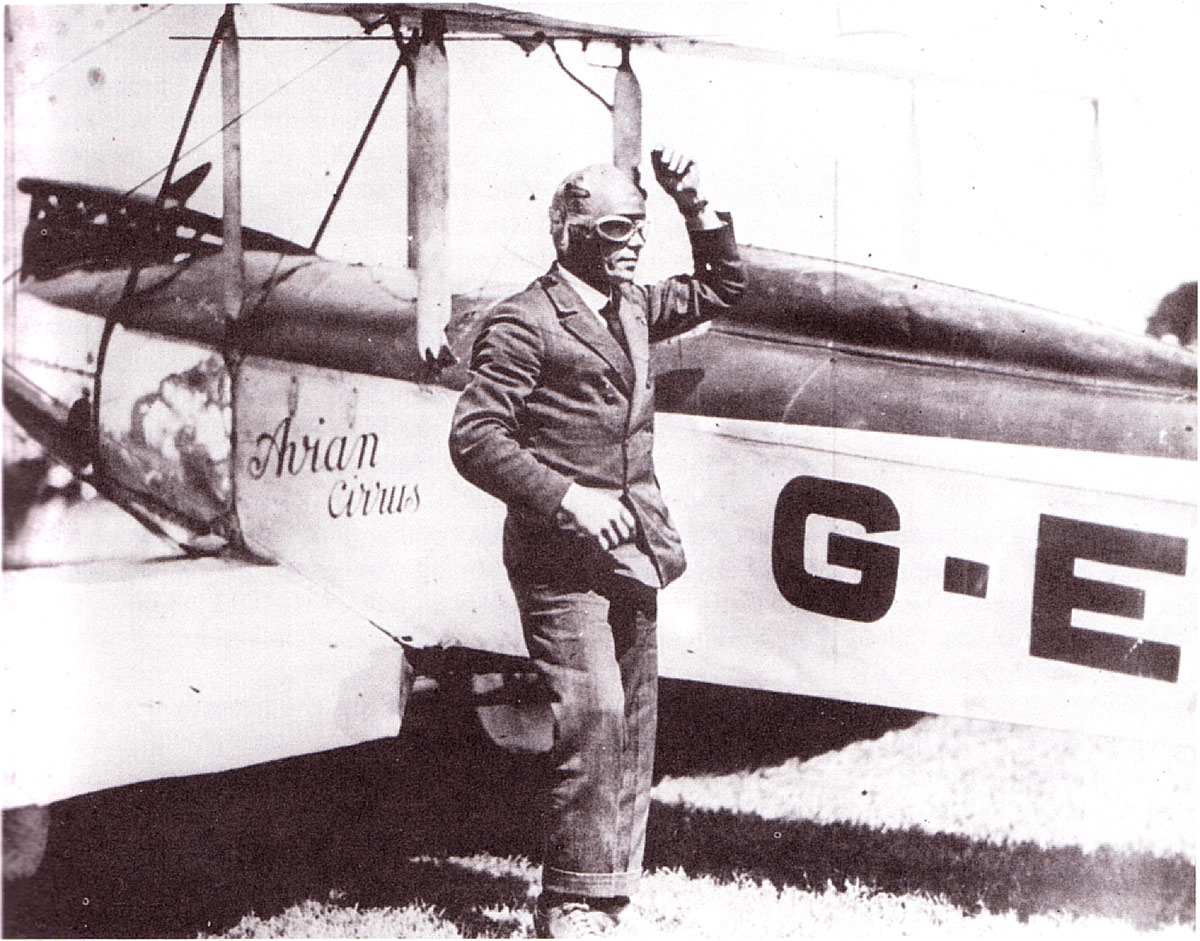
Hinkler and his Avro Avian

After the war, he worked as a test pilot for the aircraft manufacturer A.V. Roe in Southampton.

In 1921, Hinkler shipped a tiny Avro Baby to Sydney, Australia. It was filled with fuel and flown non-stop to Bundaberg, Queensland, a distance of 1,370 kilometres (850 mi).

During the 1920s, he competed in numerous aviation events and set many records, among which was a non-stop flight from England to Latvia. For his England-Latvia flight he was awarded the Oswald Watt Gold Medal for 1927. He was a pilot of the British Schneider Trophy seaplane competitor.

Hinkler flew the first solo flight between England and Australia, departing England on 7 February 1928 and arriving in Darwin on 22 February; and back in his home town of Bundaberg a few days later on 27 February. This reduced the England-Australia record from 28 days to just under 15 1/2 days. The aircraft used was an Avro Avian with the registration G-EBOV. The flight was little noticed before Hinkler reached India but then media interest intensified. One paper nicknamed the flyer "Hustling Hinkler" and he was the subject of the Tin Pan Alley song Hustling Hinkler Up in the Sky.

For the flights in 1920 and 1928 Hinkler had already won two Britannia trophies and the gold medal of the Fédération Aéronautique Internationale. He was also awarded the 1928 Oswald Watt Gold Medal.

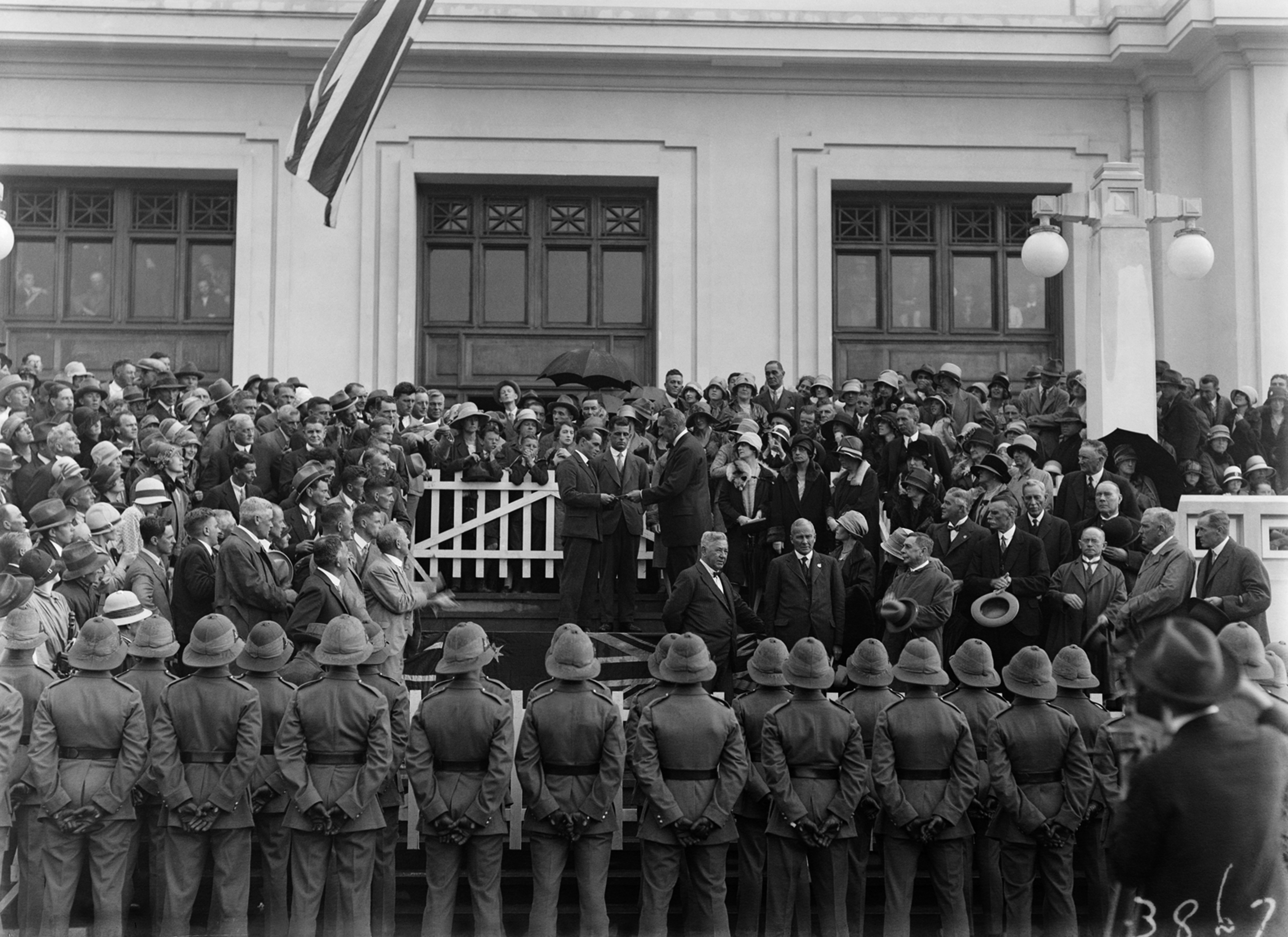
Bert Hinkler is presented a cheque and cigarette case by Prime Minister Stanley Bruce

Hinkler is quoted as telling the Australian Prime Minister Stanley Bruce at this time: "You know, one day, people will fly by night and use the daylight for sightseeing." (In 1998 Australian Lang Kidby recreated this flight in a similar 1927 Avro Avian.) He was invited by the Speaker of the House of Representatives, Littleton Groom, to be seated on the floor of the House in recognition of his achievement. (The next time such an invitation was extended was in 1973, to Patrick White, who declined.)

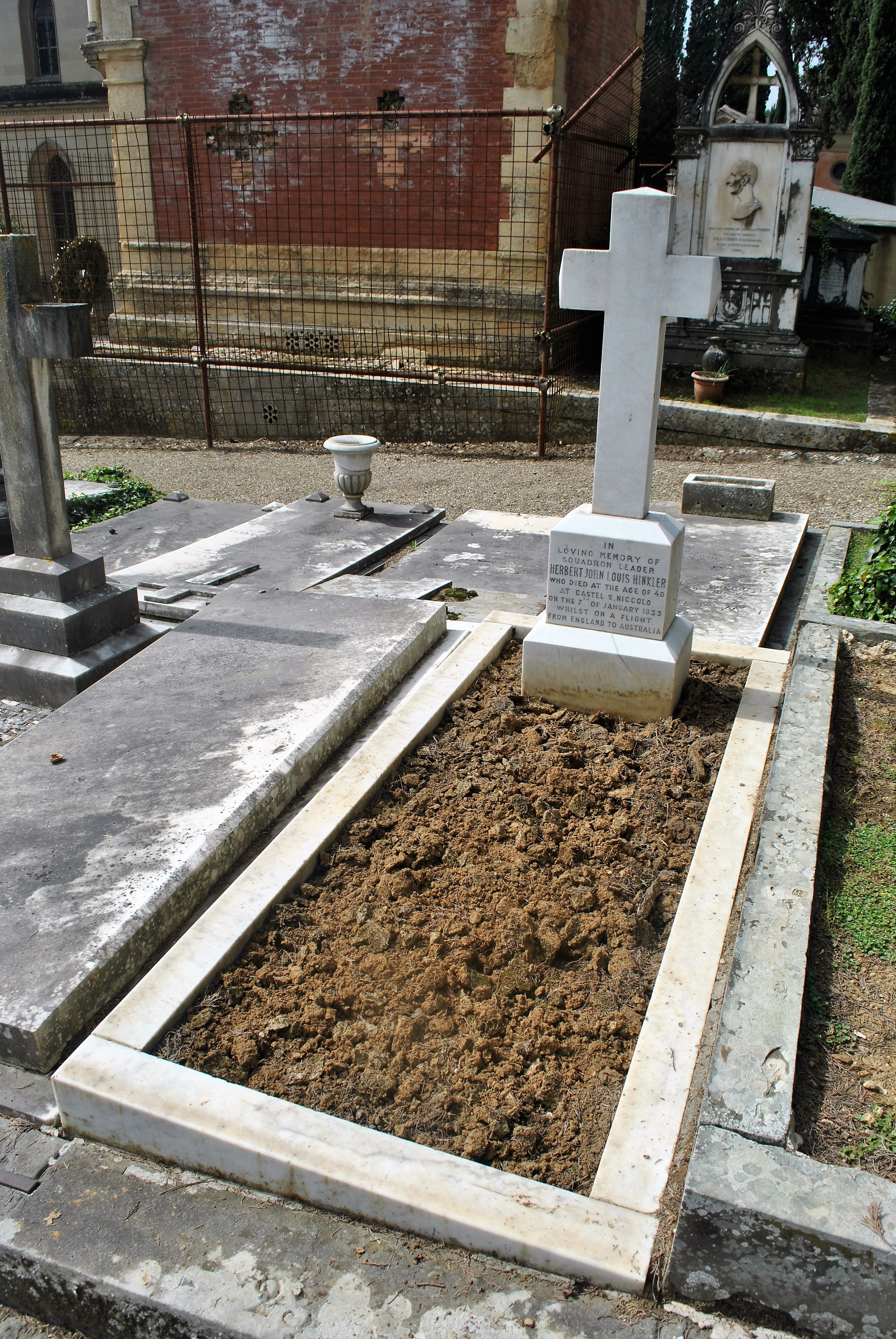
Hinkler's grave in Italy

Hinkler married in 1932.

Charcoal burners initially discovered his wrecked aircraft and informed the authorities; a further search found Hinkler's body about 70 yards (64 m) away, lying on a steep slope partially hidden by a bush. The body was badly damaged but his identity was confirmed when his passport was found. It was determined his aeroplane had crashed into the mountains the same day he departed from London. He was buried – with full military honours on the orders of Italy's ruling dictator Benito Mussolini – in the Cimitero degli Allori in Florence. He was survived by both his legal wife Katherine and his de facto wife Nance.

== Honours ==
- The Federal electorate of Hinkler, in Queensland, is named after him.
- In 1978 he was honoured on a postage stamp depicting his portrait issued by Australia Post.
- Thornhill, Southampton, Hampshire, England has three places in honour of Bert Hinkler: Hinkler Road, Hinkler Pub, and Hinkler Park, which contains a monument to him erected by the residents of Thornhill. In 1983, "Mon Repos", the house in Thornhill that Bert Hinkler and his de facto wife Hannah (Nance) Jarvis built, was saved from demolition and relocated to the Bundaberg Botanic Gardens, serving as a historical museum On 8 December 2008, the A$7.5 million Hinkler Hall of Aviation was opened to the public in Hinkler's home town of Bundaberg. Adjacent to his English home "Mon Repos", the hall continues the role the house played as a historic museum dedicated to the memory of Hinkler; this has allowed the house to be refurbished to a more domestic state and now serves as a joint attraction with the Hall of Aviation.

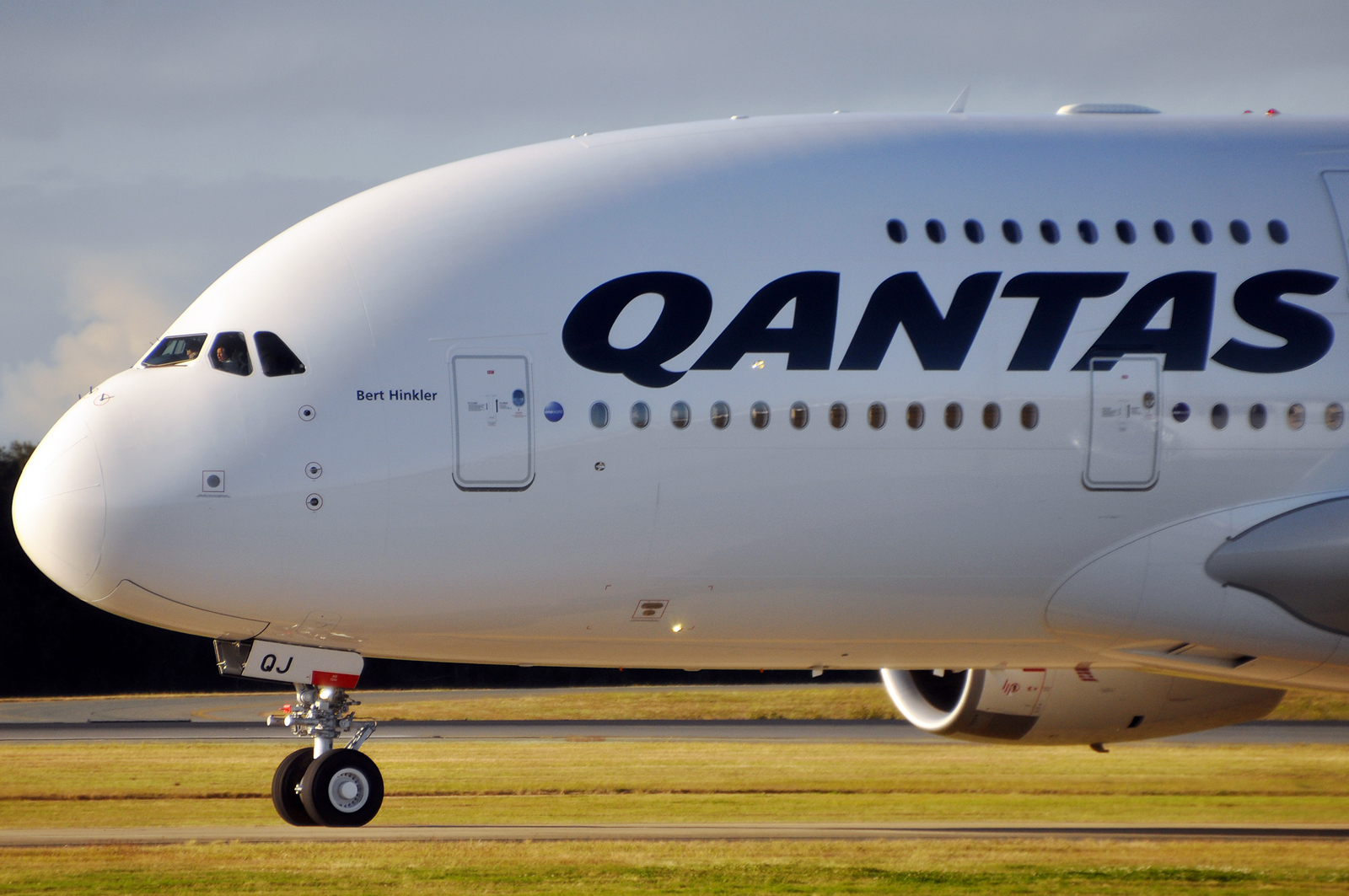
QANTAS 'Bert Hinkler' A380

- Qantas has named an Airbus A380 after the aviator, with his name featured on the aircraft.
- Hinkler Park in Bundaberg, Queensland, now hockey fields, marks the original location of Hinkler's landing in 1928 after his historic 1928 solo flight.
- The Royal Automobile Club of Queensland erected a monument atop the Sloping Hummock, an extinct volcano and one of the Bundaberg region's highest points.
- A bust of Hinkler, by sculptor George Virine, sits at the southern end of the Burnett Traffic Bridge.
- Hinkler Crescent, once a taxiway for the original Darwin Aerodrome, Fannie Bay, Darwin, NT, Australia is named after Bert Hinkler and has a commemorative plaque in the pavement.
- Hinkler Park, a popular park and playground in Katoomba, New South Wales, was dedicated to Hinkler in 1934. The park features a climbing frame in the shape of his aircraft and a picnic shelter featuring a commemorative plaque.
- Hinkler Park, adjacent to the lagoon at the north end of Manly Beach is named in his honour, and is also the site of a building for the Australian Air League. The first training Squadron opened at Manly, New South Wales on 17 January 1935.
- A cenotaph stands to Hinkler in Buss Park, Bourbong street, Central Bundaberg.
- The Hinkler Hall of Aviation is an aeronautics museum in the Bundaberg Botanic Gardens dedicated to the pioneer.
- Songs were written about Hinkler, including Hustling Hinkler, recorded by Len Maurice and Fred Monument, and Hello! Hinkler sung by Frederick George.
- Bert Hinkler was also awarded the Oswald Watt Medal four times in 1927, 1928, 1931 and 1932.
- Nakara Primary School in Nakara, Northern Territory has a school house-team called 'Hinkler'.

== Legacies ==
=== Hinkler Hall of Aviation ===
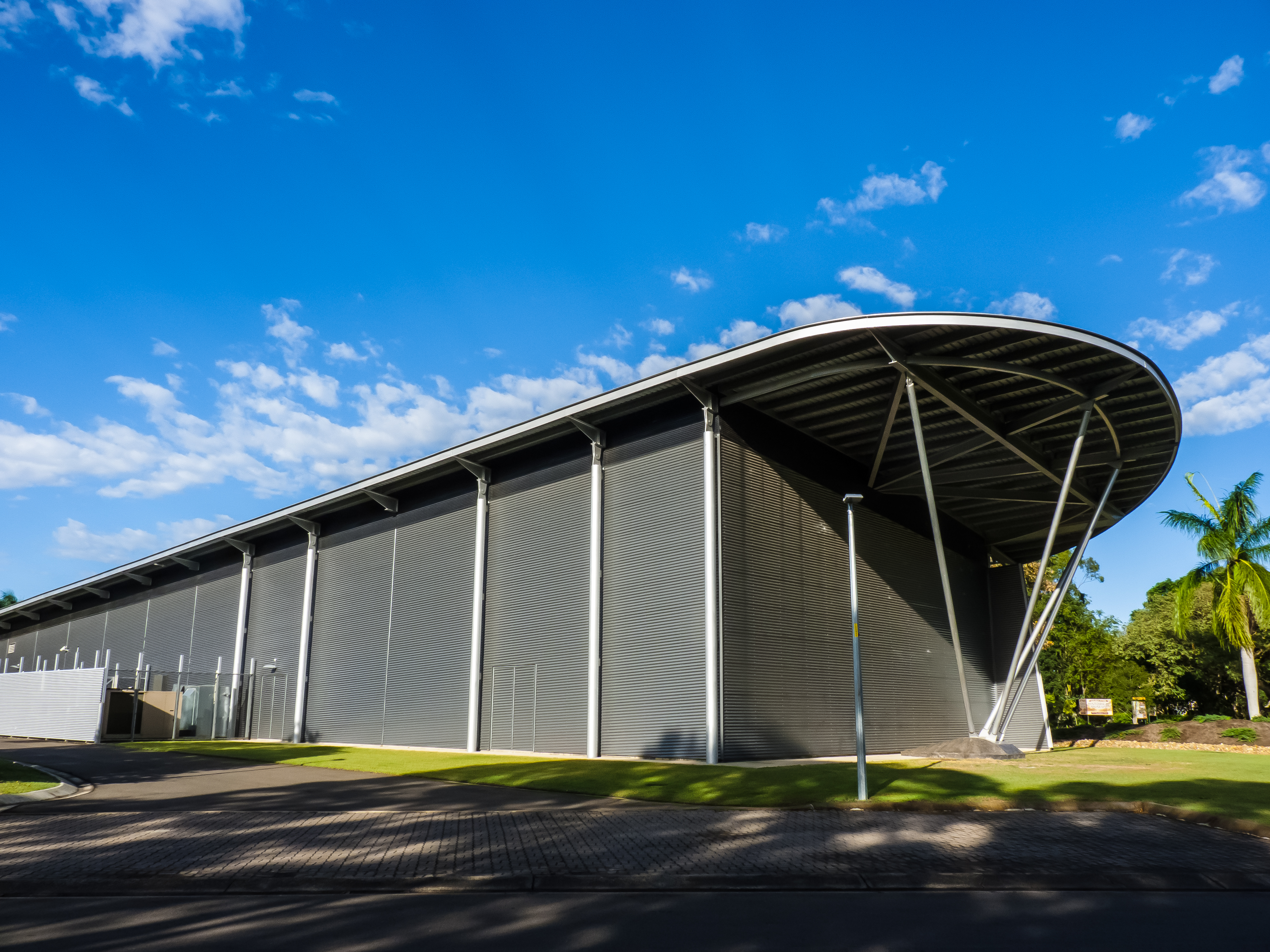
The museum in 2011.

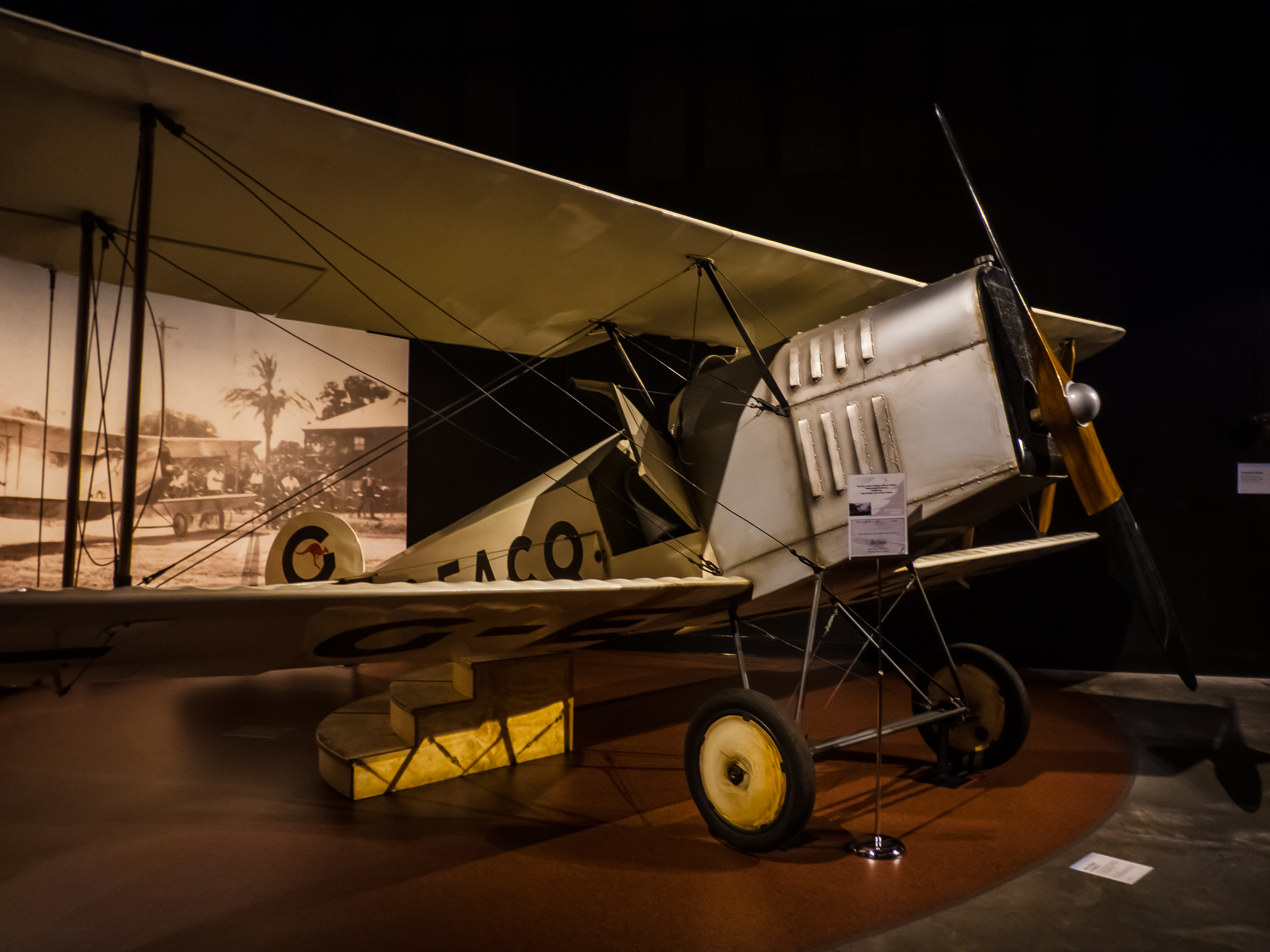
Avro Baby G-EACQ on display.

This museum opened in 2008 alongside the Hinkler House, designed to accommodate up to 34,000 visitors per year. Its collection includes five aircraft significant to Hinkler's career: a reconstructed glider from his youth, Hinkler's original Avro Baby, a replica Avro Avian, a replica Hinkler Ibis, and a reconstructed de Havilland Puss Moth.

It also displays the small piece of wood, a relic from one Hinkler's hand-made gliders, which was presented to the US astronaut Don Lind in early 1986 as a token of appreciation for his coming to Bundaberg to contribute to the Hinkler Memorial Lectures. Lind in turn gave it to Dick Scobee, the captain of the ill-fated final Space Shuttle Challenger mission. Scobee took the wood with him on board the Challenger inside a small plastic bag that he placed in his locker. After the explosion, the bag and the wood were recovered from the sea, identified, mounted, and later returned to the Hinkler Memorial Museum.

=== Correspondence archive ===
State Library of Queensland holds a significant collection of letters, correspondence and items linked to Hinkler. The letters written by Hinkler to his family, (1913–1929), reveal deeply personal accounts of his adventures abroad and perspective of his achievements. Digitisations of the letters and a 1928 recording of Bert Hinkler's speech are available online.

== See also ==
- Hinkler Ibis
- List of aviation museums
- List of museums in Queensland
