= Mon Repos Conservation Park =

Coordinates: 24.7961°S 152.4405°E

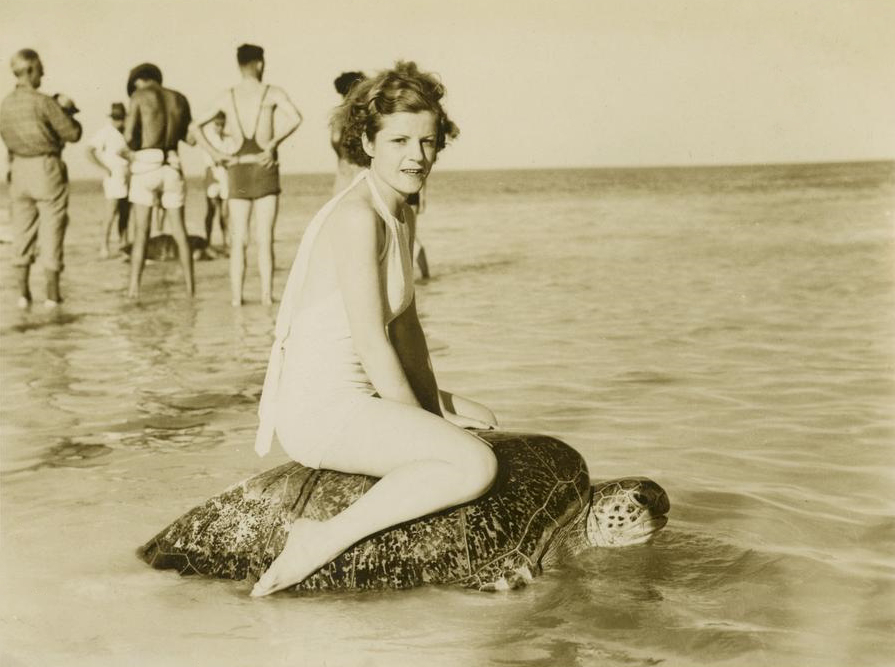
Young woman riding on the back of a turtle at Mon Repos Beach, near Bundaberg, c. 1930 (such practices are now illegal as turtles are protected in Australia)

Mon Repos Conservation Park is a national park containing an important turtle rookery located at Mon Repos, Bundaberg Region, Queensland, Australia, 14 kilometres (8.7 mi) east of Bundaberg. Mon Repos hosts the largest concentration of nesting marine turtles on the eastern Australian mainland and supports the most significant nesting population of the endangered loggerhead turtle in the South Pacific Ocean. Successful breeding here is critical if the loggerhead species is to survive. In far smaller numbers the flatback and green turtles and, intermittently, the leatherback turtle also nest along the Bundaberg coast.

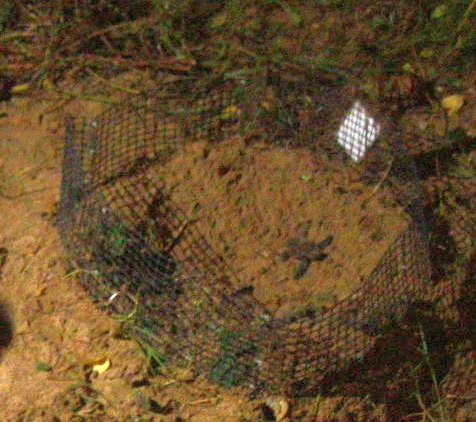
Turtle hatching, Mon Repos beach, 18 February 2011

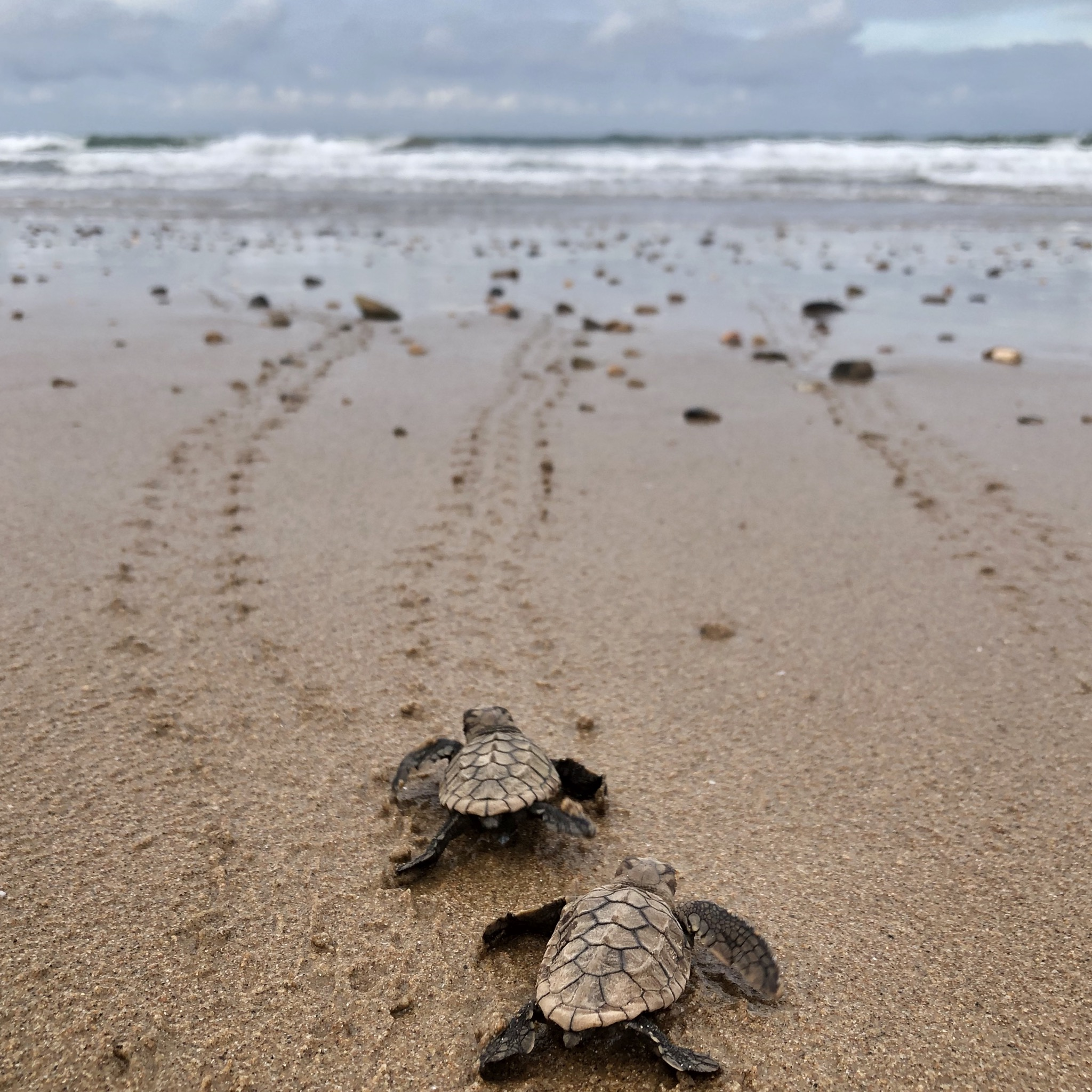
Baby turtles heading for the ocean

From November to March each year, adult turtles come ashore to lay eggs on Mon Repos beach. About eight weeks later young turtles emerge from the eggs and begin their journey to the sea. The best time to see turtles nesting is after dark from mid-November to February. Hatchlings usually leave their nests at night from mid-January until late March.

Queensland Parks and Wildlife Service rangers operate guided tours nightly during the breeding season. Mon Repos is a popular tourist attraction, with around 25,000 visitors every season. Beach access is now managed during the season to ensure that the impact of humans on nesting sea turtles is minimal.

Mon Repos is French for "My Rest" and was the name of the homestead established by Augustus Purling Barton in 1884. Barton was a pioneer of the Queensland sugar industry.

In the early 1890s, the French Government in collaboration with the Queensland Government and the New South Wales Government selected Mon Repos beach as the endpoint of an undersea telegraph cable between Australia and New Caledonia. The cable opened in 1893 and connected the telegraph at Bundaberg Post Office through the cable to New Caledonia and then via Fiji and Hawaii to the mainland United States of America. The remains of the cable hut and the radio tower are within the conservation park.

== See also ==
- Protected areas of Queensland
