= Mon Repos, Queensland =

Mon Repos Bundaberg, Queensland
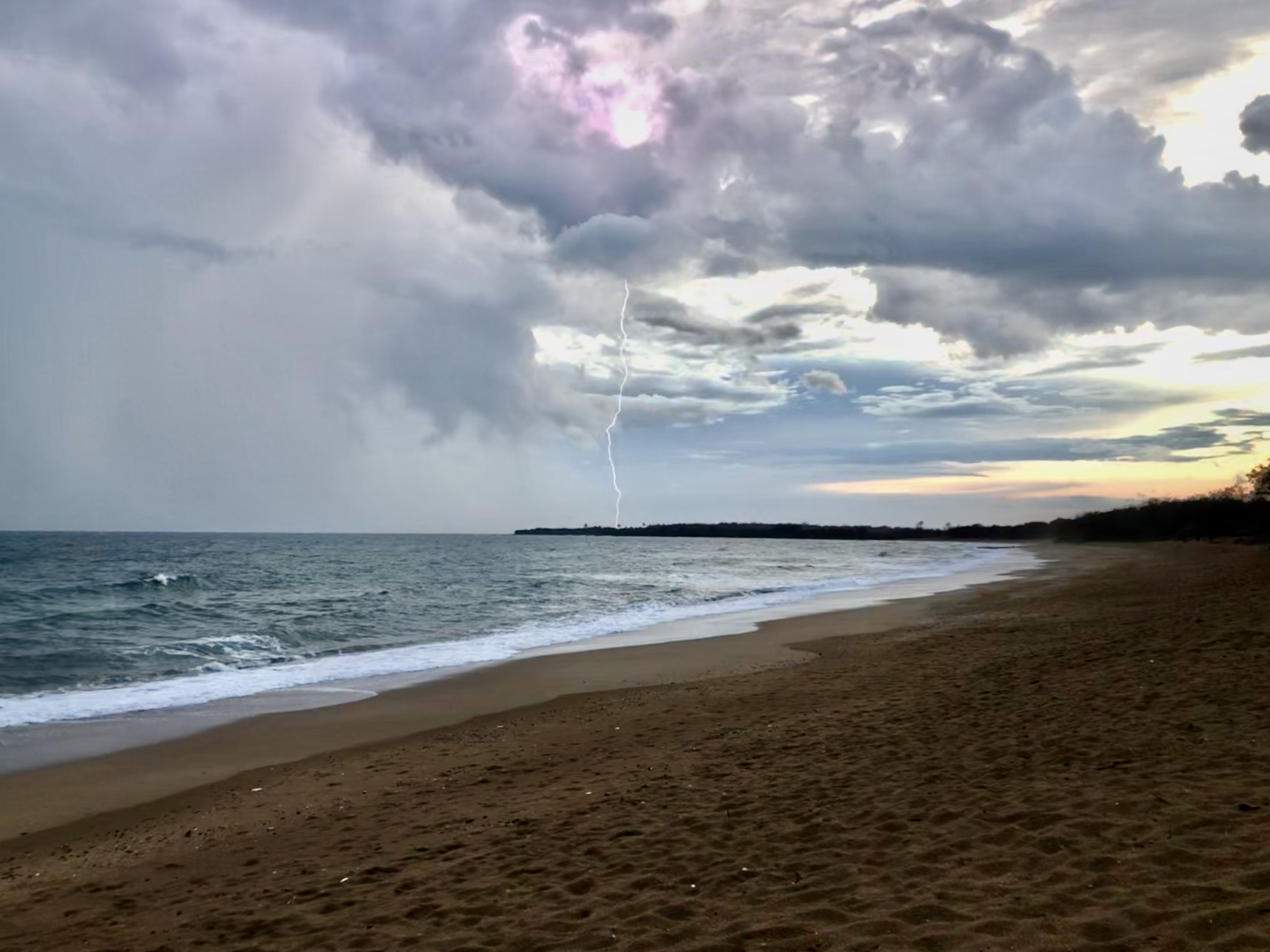
- Mon Repos Beach, 2020

- Coordinates: 24.8049°S 152.4405°E
- Population: 24 (2021 census)
  - Density: 3.87/km^{2} (10.03/sq mi)
- Postcode(s): 4670
- Area: 6.2 km^{2} (2.4 sq mi)
- Time zone: AEST (UTC+10:00)
- Location: 13.3 km (8 mi) NE of Bundaberg; 374 km (232 mi) N of Brisbane
- LGA(s): Bundaberg Region
- State electorate(s): Burnett
- Federal division(s): Hinkler
Suburbs around Mon Repos:
Burnett Heads	Coral Sea	Coral Sea
Qunaba	Mon Repos	Coral Sea
Qunaba	Qunaba	Bargara

Mon Repos is a coastal locality in the Bundaberg Region, Queensland, Australia. In the 2021 census, Mon Repos had a population of 24 people.

== Geography ==
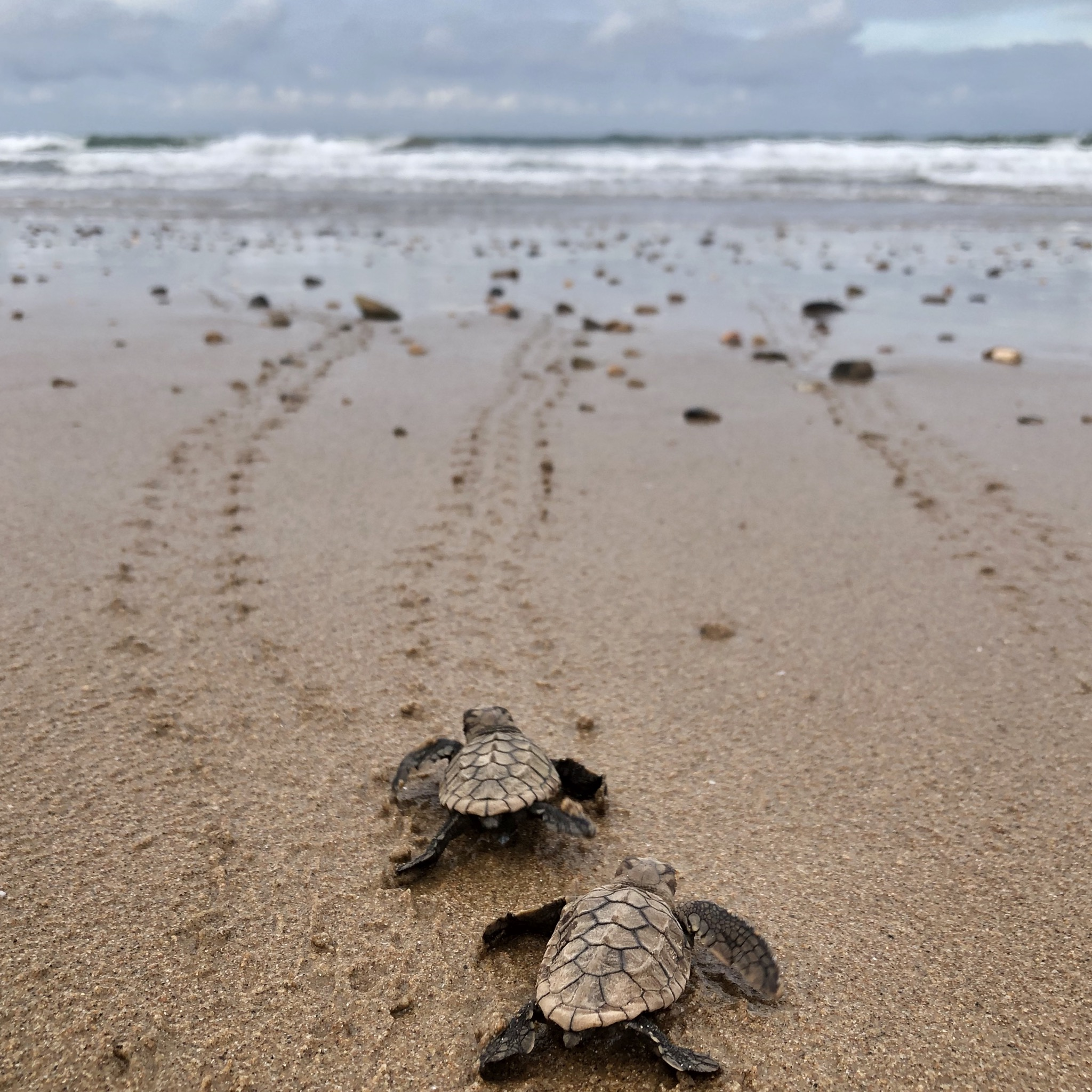
Newly-hatched baby turtles heading for the sea, 2020

Mon Repos Beach (24.7960°S 152.4416°E) is a long sandy beach along most of the coastline at Mon Repos.

Most of the coastline is within the Mon Repos Conservation Park (24.7954°S 152.4400°E), established to protect the nesting areas of turtles. The north of the locality is still used for agriculture, a mixture of grazing and crop growing. The south of the locality is reserved for environmental purposes. There are some small pockets of housing and a caravan park on the coast

The Barolin Nature Reserve is inland of the conservation park (24.8105°S 152.4440°E). It is filled with grassy plains and wetlands and has a sizeable population of birds. Earlier known as Pasturage Reserve, it was primarily used for cattle grazing. However, grazing has been reduced significantly to save the forest.

== History ==
Mon Repos is French for "My Rest" and was the name of the homestead built in 1884 by Augustus Purling Barton, a Queensland sugar industry pioneer. Barton also built the Mon Repos sugar-mill in 1884, as a crushing plant, which was converted into a manufacturing plant in 1888. State Library of Queensland hold the Barton Family records which includes information about the Mon Repos homestead and the running of the Barton's sugar mills and plantations.

In the 1890s, the governments of France, Queensland and New South Wales decided to construct an undersea telegraph cable to link Australia to North America across the Pacific Ocean via New Caledonia, Fiji, Samoa, and Hawaii. The cable came ashore at Mon Repos, where a cable station was constructed. The cable was used until the 1920s when it was replaced by a radio service via Sydney and the cable station demolished. The cables remained in place under the sea where they were used during World War II by the Royal Australian Navy to train crews in midget submarines operating from HMS Bonaventure to cut cables in preparation to cut undersea telephone cables in Tokyo. Two lieutenants Bruce Enzer and Bruce Carey died during the training. Some remains of the cable station can be seen within the caravan park.

Sandhills Provisional School opened on 20 March 1893. On 1 January 1909 it became Sandhills State School. In January 1921 it was renamed Bargara State School.

In 1912 pioneer aviator Bert Hinkler launched one of his first home-made gliders on Mon Repos Beach and flew 10 metres (33 ft) above the sand dunes.

== Demographics ==
In the 2016 census, Mon Repos had a population of 30 people.

In the 2021 census, Mon Repos had a population of 24 people.

== Heritage listings ==
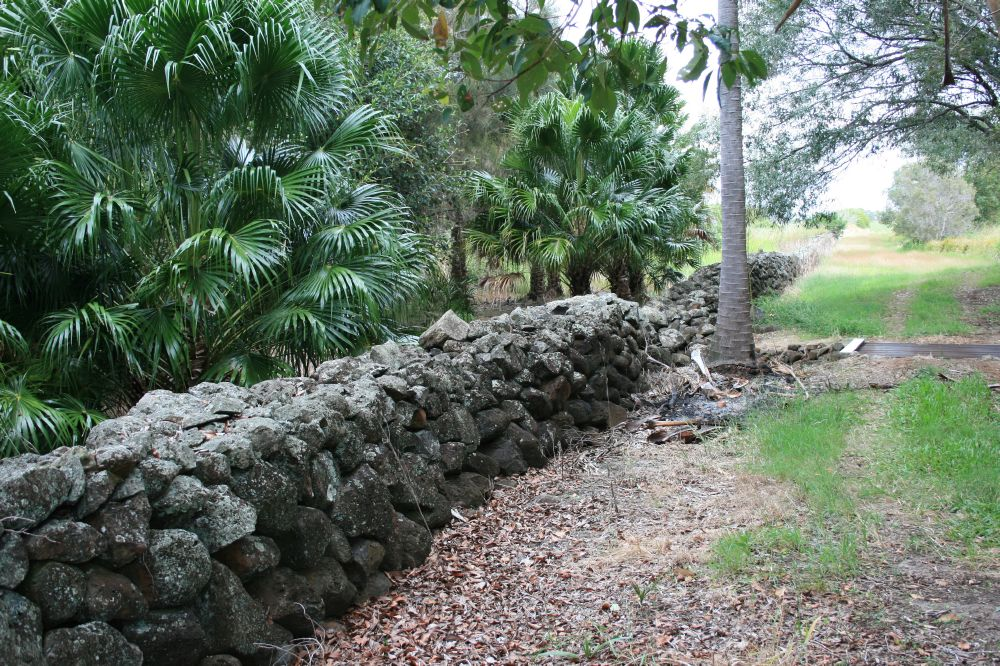
South Sea Islander Wall, 2009

Mon Repos has a number of heritage-listed sites, including Grange Road: South Sea Islander Wall

Around 1884 Augustus Barton, owner of the Mon Repos homestead used South Sea Islander indentured labour on his properties, which before being planted with cane had to be cleared of scoria stones, remnants of a volcanic formation located nearby. These stones were then used to construct the South Sea Islander Walls which remain substantially intact and are now heritage listed, a reminder of the people who were brought to work as slaves on Queensland farms between 1863 and 1904.

== Education ==
Despite the name, Bargara State School is a government primary (Prep-6) school for boys and girls at 591 Bargara Road in Mon Repos (24.8221°S 152.4387°E). In 2018, the school had an enrolment of 448 students with 31 teachers (26 full-time equivalent) and 22 non-teaching staff (13 full-time equivalent).

There are no secondary schools in Mon Repos. The nearest government secondary school is Kepnock State High School in Kepnock in Bundaberg to the south-west.

== Facilities ==
Despite the name, Bargara SES Facility is at 18 Potters Road in Mon Repos (24.8219°S 152.4390°E).

== Attractions ==
The Mon Repos Turtle Centre was built in 2019 by Queensland Parks & Wildlife to facilitate research and education surrounding turtle conservation. It offers visits and tours to the public and school groups.
