= Bourbong Street Weeping Figs =

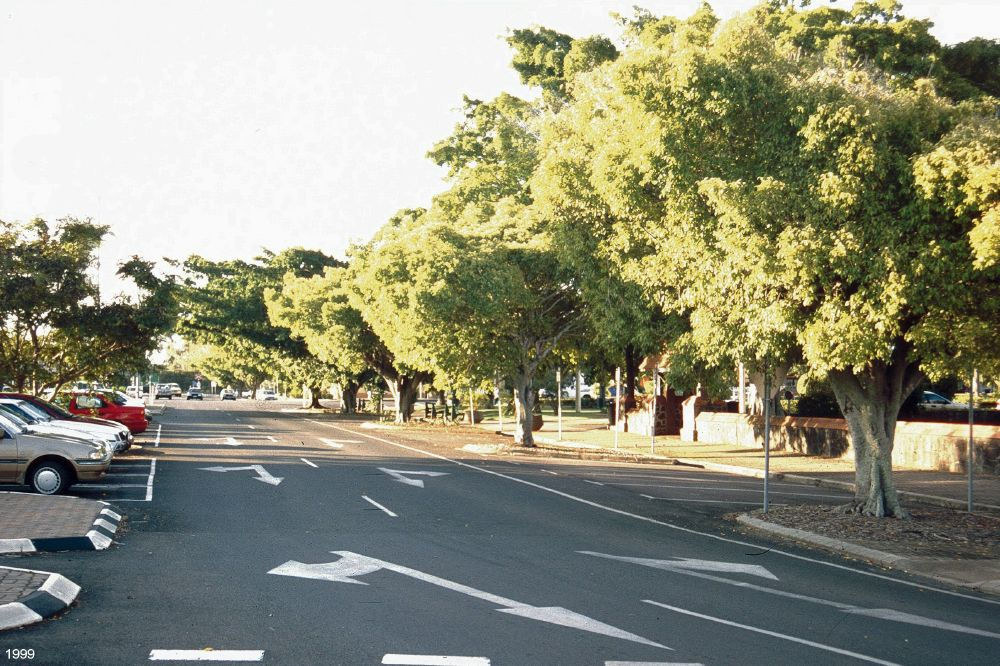
- Bourbong Street Weeping Figs, 1999

- Location within Queensland Location within Australia
- 24.8664°S 152.3479°E
- Location: Bourbong Street, Bundaberg Central, Bundaberg, Bundaberg Region, Queensland, Australia

Queensland Heritage Register
- Official name: Bourbong Street Weeping Figs
- Type: state heritage (landscape)
- Designated: 23 July 1999
- Reference no.: 602065
- Significant period: 1888 (historical)

Bourbong Street Weeping Figs is a heritage-listed group of trees at Bourbong Street, Bundaberg Central, Bundaberg, Bundaberg Region, Queensland, Australia. They were added to the Queensland Heritage Register on 23 July 1999.

== History ==
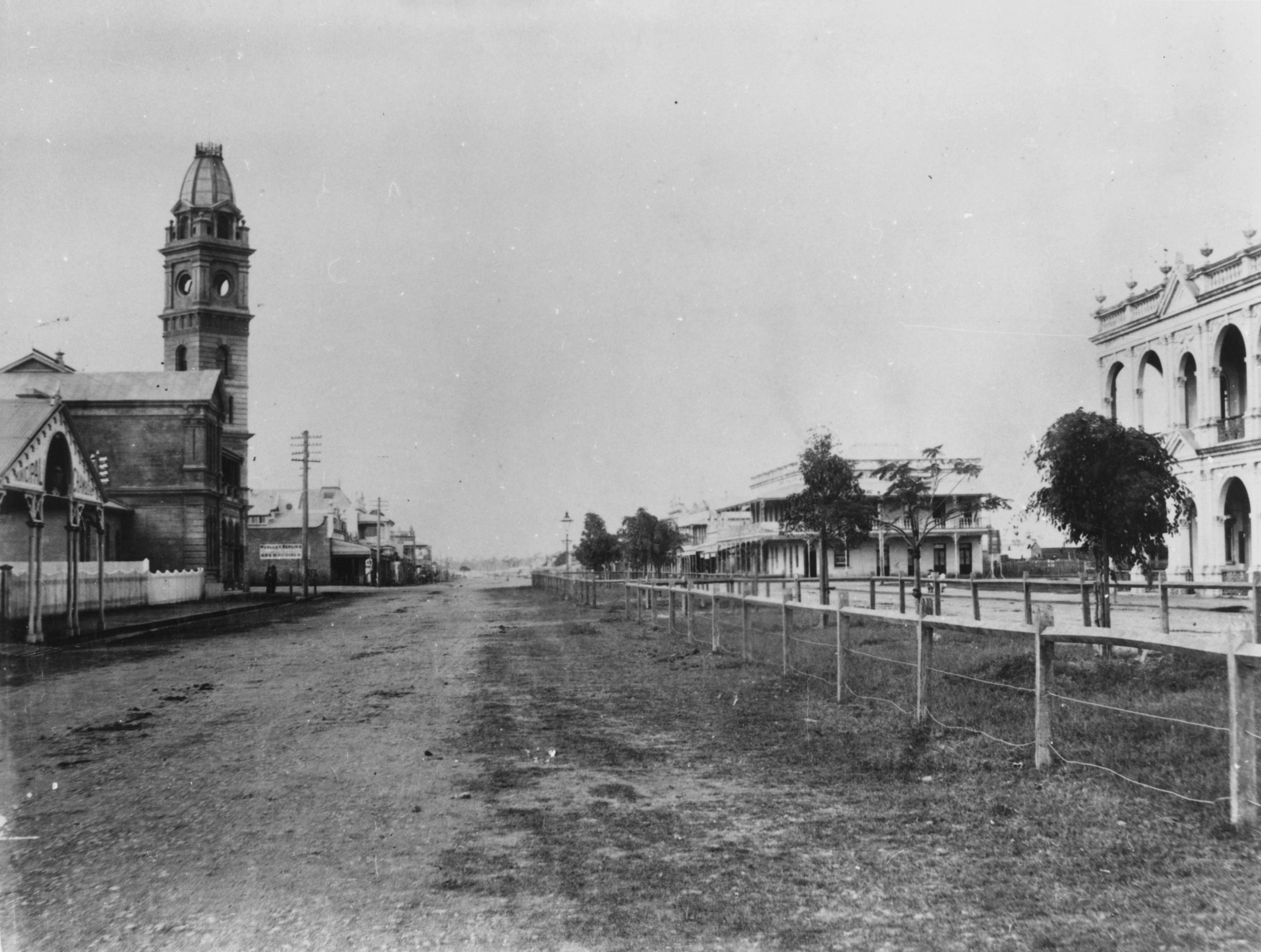
Weeping Figs in Bourbong Street, circa 1890

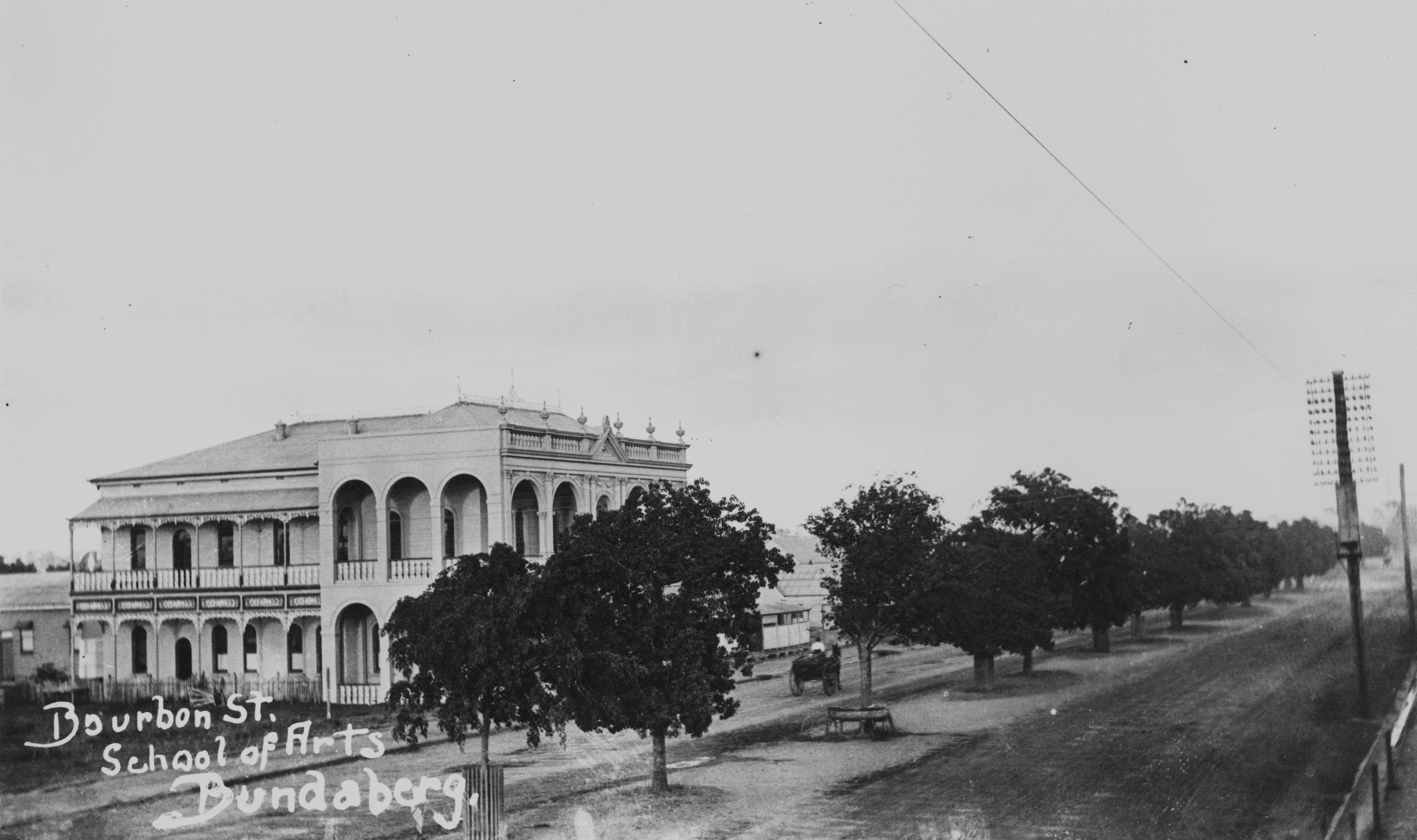
Weeping Figs, circa 1911

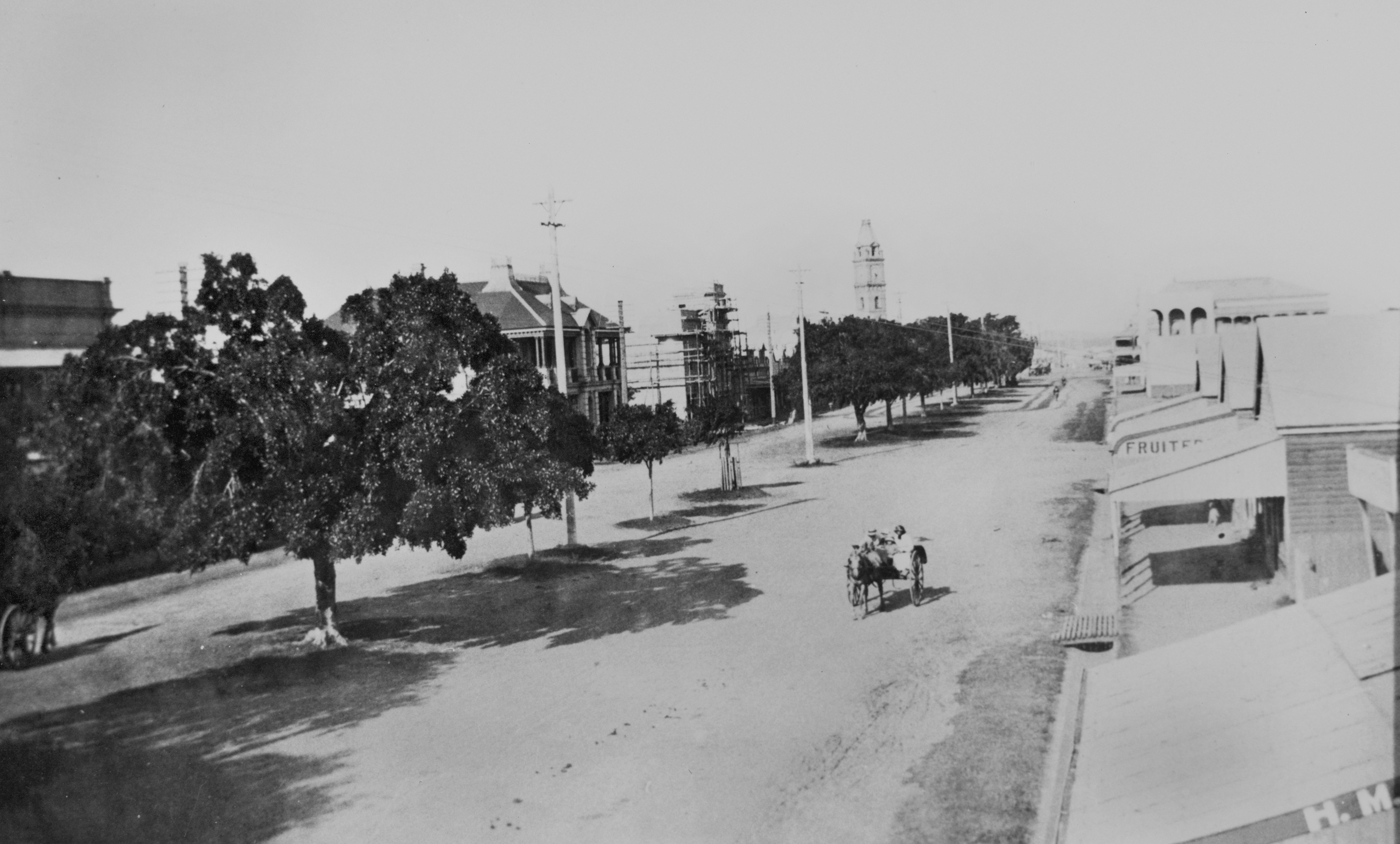
Weeping figs, circa 1920

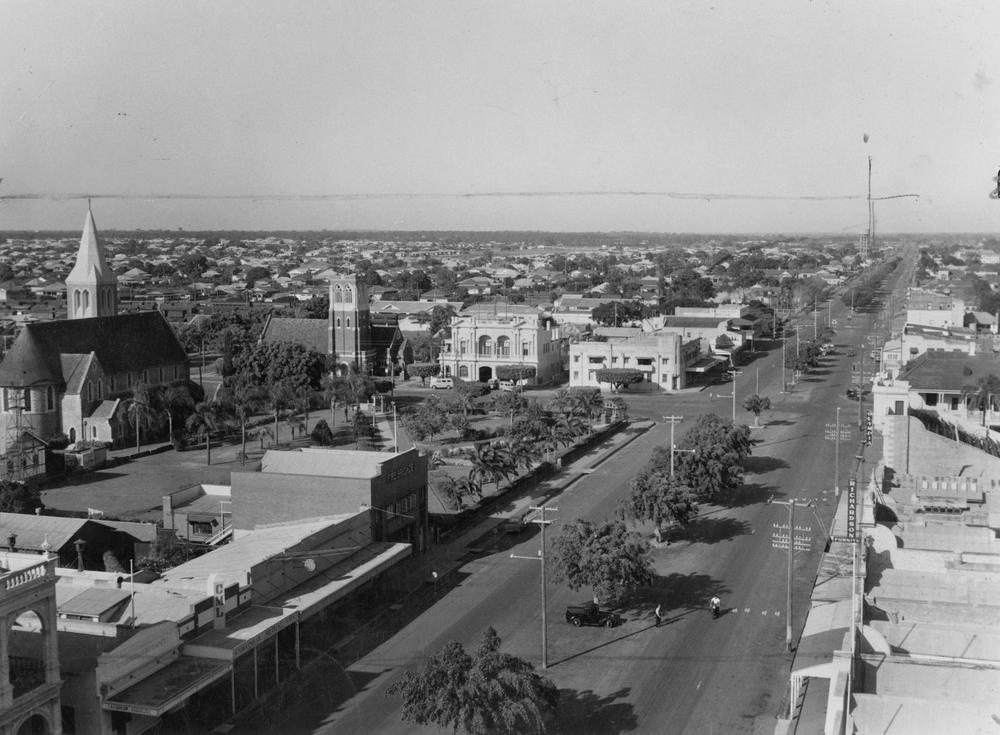
Weeping figs, 1954

The Bourbong Street Weeping Figs are four mature Ficus benjamina planted in the centre of the Road reserve in 1888, between Barolin and Maryborough Streets. Additional plantings were undertaken by the Bundaberg City Council in the 1920s.

The first town survey for Bundaberg, situated on the Burnett river, was completed in 1869, ultimately establishing it as a service centre with harbour and port facilities for the agricultural and mineral produce of the area. During the following decade the sugar industry consolidated and a general economic boom in Queensland in the 1880s enhanced the local sugar boom. During the 1880s the Millaquin, Fairymead and Bingera sugar refineries were established providing the necessary infrastructure for the success of the fledgling industry.

The sugar industry and the township of Bundaberg increased in both demographic size and political influence during the late nineteenth century, stimulating the demand for municipal landscaping that reflected this affluence. Municipal landscaping enhanced the streetscapes by adding character and dignity, also providing essential shade in the main business precinct of a city. Trees were also incorporated for the benefits to the health of the city, thought to assist in clearing of noxious smoke and fumes. The Ficus family were a popular choice for such plantings due to the dense foliage and broad spread of the canopy, which when planted in close proximity provided a continuous avenue of shade. The use of planting in the centre of the street, resolved the concern over the root system interfering with building foundations. Bourbong Street was gazetted two chains wide allowing ample room for two way traffic and centre plantings on the road reserve.

The commitment of the Bundaberg City Council to urban landscaping was spasmodic, with resolutions for the planting of shade trees in Bourbon Street passed and rescinded twice in 1882. In August 1888, local business identity Frederic Buss, donated £500 towards the planting of trees, as well as fencing and trenching of the ground to ensure that the project was undertaken. Trees were planted in Bourbong, Barolin, Maryborough and Woongarra Streets through this project. In the early 1920s additional trees were planted in Bourbong Street of the same variety as the original trees.

Frederic William Buss, (1845–1926) migrated to Queensland in 1863 from Kent in England, establishing Buss and Turner department store in 1888 on Bourbon Street, Bundaberg. Buss's business empire expanded into commercial real estate and eventually he was to become an influential figure in the local sugar industry, including production refining and distilling in his portfolio of interests. Although he was active in local politics, taking his place in both the chamber of commerce and the municipal council, Buss declined to take a seat in the Queensland Parliament, instead concentrating on local affairs.

The changing use of the road system from horse to car over the twentieth century saw the gradual erosion of the avenue of trees, resulting in the four trees between Barolin and Maryborough streets being the only remaining trees in the central business district of the once grander concept. Over recent years, these figs have suffered considerable stress. The open tree surrounds are considerably reduced, thereby restricting the root system form receiving adequate rainfall and moisture. The recent completion of redevelopment works in the central business district further reduced the open-ground plots provided for the figs.

== Description ==
The Bourbong Street Weeping Figs are four mature Ficus benjamina planted in the centre of the road reserve, between Barolin and Maryborough Streets, Bundaberg. The trees are centrally aligned and mounted in a pebblecrete base allowing an open-ground plot of approximately one metre square. The trees are interspersed with double sided angle parking with identical pebblecrete treatment as the tree surrounds. The trees contribute to the general streetscape of the central business district which includes the School of Arts, former Commercial Bank, the Post Office, the War Memorial and Buss Park. Together the buildings, park and weeping figs form a distinctive precinct.

== Heritage listing ==
The Bourbong Street Weeping Figs were listed on the Queensland Heritage Register on 23 July 1999 having satisfied the following criteria.

The place is important in demonstrating the evolution or pattern of Queensland's history.

The Bourbong Street Weeping Figs, located between Barolin and Maryborough Streets comprise four mature Ficus benjamina originally planted in the centre of the road reserve in 1888, with additional plantings in the 1920s. The trees demonstrate the affluence of Bundaberg as the centre of a thriving sugar industry in the late nineteenth century that is reflected in the addition of major street planting to the urban fabric of Bundaberg. Additional trees planted in the early 1920s, demonstrate the continuing commitment to civic landscaping by the Bundaberg City Council.

The place is important because of its aesthetic significance.

The trees dominate the streetscape and are integral to the aesthetic of the main commercial precinct of Bundaberg.

The place has a special association with the life or work of a particular person, group or organisation of importance in Queensland's history.

The Bourbong Street Weeping Figs have a strong association with Frederic Buss, a prominent businessman, agriculturalist and municipal alderman, as an example of his generosity and commitment to the municipal development of Bundaberg.
