= Bundaberg Post Office =

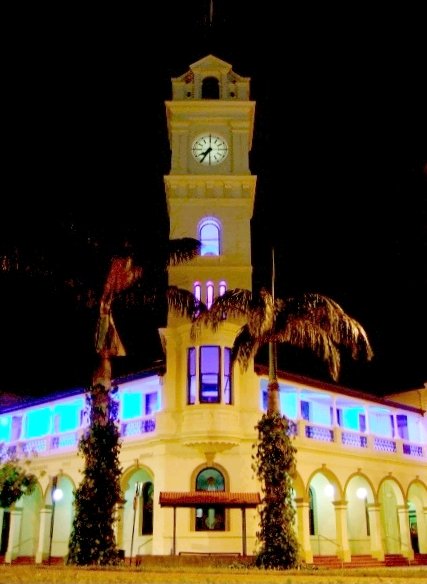
- Bundaberg Post Office at night, 2006

- Location within Queensland
- 24.8659°S 152.3484°E
- Location: 155a Bourbong Street, Bundaberg Central, Bundaberg, Bundaberg Region, Queensland, Australia

Commonwealth Heritage List
- Official name: Bundaberg Post Office
- Type: Listed place (Historic)
- Designated: 8 November 2011
- Reference no.: 106125

Bundaberg Post Office is a heritage-listed post office at 155a Bourbong Street, Bundaberg Central, Bundaberg, Bundaberg Region, Queensland, Australia. It was added to the Australian Commonwealth Heritage List on 8 November 2011.

== History ==
After JJ Clark's dismissal as Queensland Colonial Architect in 1885, various emerging projects were left in limbo. One was the new Bundaberg Post Office, intended to replace a smaller post and telegraph office built in c.1879. Charles McLay, who like John Smith Murdoch was another Scot initially mentored by Clark, submitted designs for Bundaberg's new post office in 1886 to the new Colonial Architect, George St Paul Connolly. There were three of these designs in all – Connolly favoured internal competitions for Public Works designs - of which this one was chosen after revisions between 1887 and 1889. During this time McLay was promoted to chief draftsman in the Colonial Architect's office. He designed the Brisbane Customs House in 1886, a seminal late Renaissance-early Baroque design. He then designed the Fortitude Valley Post Office of 1887, and prepared an unbuilt design for Rockhampton Post Office which was similar in appearance to Fortitude Valley. The Bundaberg Post Office was constructed in 1890–1891; it also included a Crown Lands Department Office.

The French Cable Co. began exchanging messages through the Vancouver via New Caledonia undersea telegraph cable which terminated at its office on the first floor of the post office in 1893.

In 1907, the first floor Lands Office was converted into post master's quarters, possibly involving construction of timber stud-framed partition in north pavilion.

Additions and alterations to the building were carried out in the mid-1950s, including the tower clock and mechanism, probably including new clock faces, and additions such as the garage, bicycle shelter and toilet block.

About 1998, the building underwent major refurbishment of public spaces with replacement of original lath and plaster ceiling with plasterboard ceilings, installation of polished timber joinery and services; repartitioning of area behind public space for administrative offices; creation of continuous bays of private letter boxes within the northern end wing including a projection and new verandah facing Post Office Lane; construction of disabled access ramp to private letter box entrance from Barolin Street; construction of new stair and glazed partition in north pavilion, provision of business mail centre to north of public office, doors removed from corner clock tower entrance and replaced with automatic sliding glass doors, general upgrade of services and finishes throughout building. The work also included conversion of former private letter box area in the western single-storey bay to a lettable external revenue area.

At some point in time, some original features were lost, including:

- Original sunhoods removed from rear-facing windows
- Cast iron ridge cresting (pre-1970s) and roof ventilators (post-1970s) removed
- Original rendered finish overpainted

== Description ==
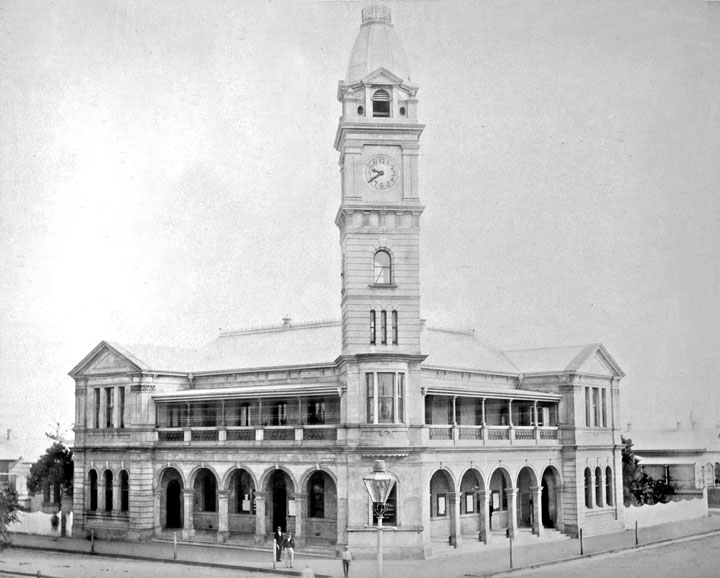
Bundaberg Post and Telegraph Offices, circa 1890

Bundaberg Post Office is at 155a Bourbong Street, corner Barolin Street, Bundaberg, comprising the whole of Lot 11 RP147676.

The Bundaberg Post Office is at the commercial centre of the large provincial city of Bundaberg and is located on the northwest corner of the Barolin and Bourbong Street intersection. In context, several notable late Italianate designs are nearby, including the unusual palazzo-form St Joseph's Catholic Cathedral of c.1888–1900.

Essentially L-shaped in plan, the original double-storey building is constructed hard up to the street boundaries at the corner of the site. The clock tower is set 45 degrees to the bulk of the building and dominates the intersection; there is a single-storey wing set back slightly from the frontage at both the north and west ends of the building. The remaining rear portion of the site is accessed via Post Office Lane which runs along the northern boundary. This area has been largely infilled with later building area over an extended period of time to provide a business centre, covered loading dock and additions to both of the single-storey wings.

In details and represented style the building is in a largely astylar Italianate. The principal street elevations are screened by a double-height arcade. The ground floor arcade columns are square-chamfered components, with the suggestion of a Tuscan capital carried in the moulding. This is sustained across the stilted arcades on the ground floor of each flanking pavilion. The street level is therefore lightly proportioned on a three-step stylobate, the upper level is a verandah with sculpted cornice, Romanesque cast iron columns, and plain masonry pedestals interspersed with a cast iron lace balustrade. The upper trios of wing front windows are set in a plain panel flanked by quasi-pilasters which are scored down their centres, topped with a short floral frieze and then paired brackets to support the pediment above each wing. The two flanking pavilion wing pediments have plain panelled tympani. The first floor openings to verandah areas contain paired half-glazed panelled timber doors.

The corner tower is angled diagonally to the street corner, and has an astylar arched window set in a plain stuccoed wall at street level, an oriel bay in astylar Italianate at first floor level, two levels of rusticated walling enclosing three slot windows on the second floor and a voussoired arched window on the third. These are topped by a frieze of plain-surfaced brackets, a clock level with scored and chamfered quasi-pilasters similar to those on the first floor wing fronts, and a miniature basilica-fronted sixth level with an arch containing metal louvres enclosed in a pedimented breakfront, and two flanking "aisle" bays with orb finials and oval vents in their spandrels. The tower roof is an octagonal mansard with a wrought iron-railed platform and crimped metal cladding, flagpole and weathervane, and the main roof is a simply handled L-shape with two gabled hips. The loggia floor has a non-original anti-slip textured finish.

The building has two storeys with a 6-storey clock tower and includes the following elements:

- Structural frame: Load-bearing solid brick, stone footings, timber-framed floor and roof, cast iron and timber-framed ground floor areas where clear spans required
- External walls: Rendered brick with ruled ashlar finish to principal street elevations and rusticated banding to projecting pavilions and clock tower; tuckpointed face brickwork to rear elevations flanking Post Office Lane; elaborate cast iron wall vents; cement mouldings
- Internal walls: Generally hard plastered brickwork; some exposed timber-framed partition walls with V-jointed timber lining boards
- Floor: Timber-framed and boarded throughout; moulded timber skirting boards
- Ceiling: Lath and plaster throughout; beaded timber lining boards to arcade soffits
- Roof: Gabled hipped form with corrugated galvanised iron cladding, cast iron ridge cresting, metal ridge ventilators, ogee profile cast iron rainwater goods and boarded eaves soffits; rendered brick chimneys with moulded caps. Skillion-roofed rear verandah and first floor arcade roof finished with corrugated galvanised iron and beaded board lining to soffits. Clock tower mansard roof clad with crimped metal with flagpole and weathervane.
- Panelled polished timber doors, timber-framed double-hung sash windows, moulded polished timber architraves and skirting boards, polished timber staircases.
- Cast iron columns to ground floor public spaces and first floor verandahs with cast iron balustrade panels
- Timber picket fences to part frontages

=== Condition ===
Externally, Bundaberg Post Office exhibits its original design exceptionally well with regard to the architectural conception, principal materials and detail, although cumulative works have resulted in the loss of some architectural detail and overall form, such as alterations to the flanking single-storey wings, painted wall surfaces and removal of the main entrance doors.

Internally, original fabric and joinery remains, although cumulative refurbishment works throughout the building, particularly with regard to the changing uses of the spaces, have diminished the integrity of the original finishes. Similarly, works in relation to use and technology such as installation of floor linings, partition walls, suspended ceilings, mechanical ducting, joinery and the like have resulted in the loss of some original fabric and fittings.

== Heritage listing ==
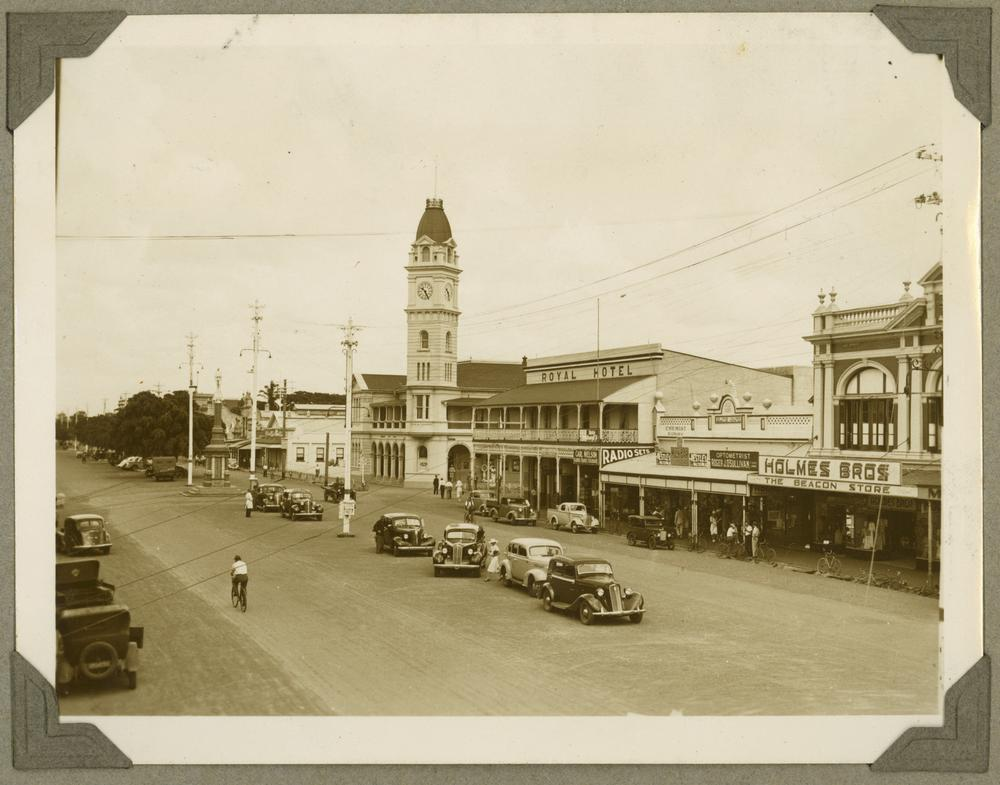
Bundaberg Post Office at the centre of town in Bourbong Street, circa 1930

Bundaberg Post Office was listed on the Australian Commonwealth Heritage List on 8 November 2011 having satisfied the following criteria.

Criterion A: Processes

Bundaberg Post Office, constructed in 1891 and incorporating a Crown Lands Department Office as well as offices of the French Cable Co., is a large regional postal facility which is an integral part of the city's historic central civic and administrative precinct, stemming from its rich history and wealth as one of Queensland's great coastal ports. The substantial dual frontage and landmark tower in scale and architectural achievement embody a prosperity and future confidence in the city of Bundaberg which stemmed in large from the region's importance to Australia's sugarcane, mining and horticultural industries, exploited from the 1870s. The scale of the colony and its resources, linked by rail and, in the case of coastal cities, sea, combined to produce prosperous large centres with less dependence on the capital than in other states. This is evidenced in the provincial centres such as Maryborough, Rockhampton, Mackay and Townsville, all of which had substantial masonry post offices erected.

The significant components of Bundaberg Post Office include the main postal building and clock tower dating from 1891 and the single storey additions to both street frontages.

Criterion D: Characteristic values

Bundaberg Post Office is an example of:

- a post office and telegraph office with quarters (second generation typology 1870–1929) with combined Crown Lands Department offices
- the Italianate Style
- the work of Charles McLay under the aegis of Colonial Architect, George Connolly.

Typologically, Bundaberg Post Office built during 1890–1891, belongs to the second generation of Australian post offices built between 1870 and 1929. These offices are generally assumed to incorporate separate components for the telegraph and postal functions in addition to quarters for the postmaster, and in this case an equal measure of integrated government offices. The integrity and legibility of the original design in internal plan form has been somewhat diminished through alterations and additions, including blurring the relationship of the integrated government offices with the rest of the planning (other than their location at first floor level), and impacting on the original planning of the quarters component. However, the building still demonstrates some principal characteristics of the type including an accomplished application of style and endowment of monumental civic form; incorporation of frontal components such as offices, public spaces, clock tower, loggia and verandahs; and an increased size to reflect the increased volume of a rapidly developing region.

With regard to operating post offices, Bundaberg Post Office is one of three "Type M3 Victorian Italianate" examples built in the period 1879–1898 with similar characteristics. As with the other examples such as Charters Towers Post Office (1892) and Warwick Post Office (1898), the large masonry buildings demonstrate landmark qualities on prominent corner sites with clearly defined frontal components, reflecting the prosperity of their regions and scale of their postal activity.

Stylistically, the building's Victorian Italianate frontages are a fine representative example of large post office buildings of the period, though Bundaberg is similar in detail to the earlier Classical Revivalism of the Toowoomba Post Office (1879). In its departure from a squared or central corner clock tower with a single principal façade more typical of designs from the preceding couple of decades throughout Australia, to an angled corner feature flanked by equally weighted frontages, Bundaberg is consistent in planning with Warwick.

Bundaberg Post Office is an example of the work of Charles McLay under the aegis of Queensland Colonial Architect, George Connolly.

Criterion E: Aesthetic characteristics

Bundaberg is a large-scaled building with impressive dual street frontages on a busy principal intersection and a very high degree of landmark quality. This is principally due to its repetitious double-height loggia and verandah screening both of the street elevations and the six level clock tower. It also shares an important civic precinct with the former Commercial Bank and the Bundaberg war memorial.

Criterion F: Technical achievement

Bundaberg Post Office is composed as a landmark corner building with two equally prominent street frontages and central clocktower, expressive of the dual, but independent, operations of the original post and telegraph functions. The placement of the corner tower on the diagonal to the main plan and street alignments has strong artistic merit and draws the eye to the building in three dimensions, a departure from the more common use of the corner tower at the time.

Criterion G: Social value

Bundaberg Post Office, built in 1891, to replace the former 1879 building on the same site is important for its association with the development of the city. It provides a visual and symbolic landmark for the local community and is of social significance for the continuity of postal services which have operated from the building for almost 120 years.
