= Buss Park =

Park in Queensland, Australia

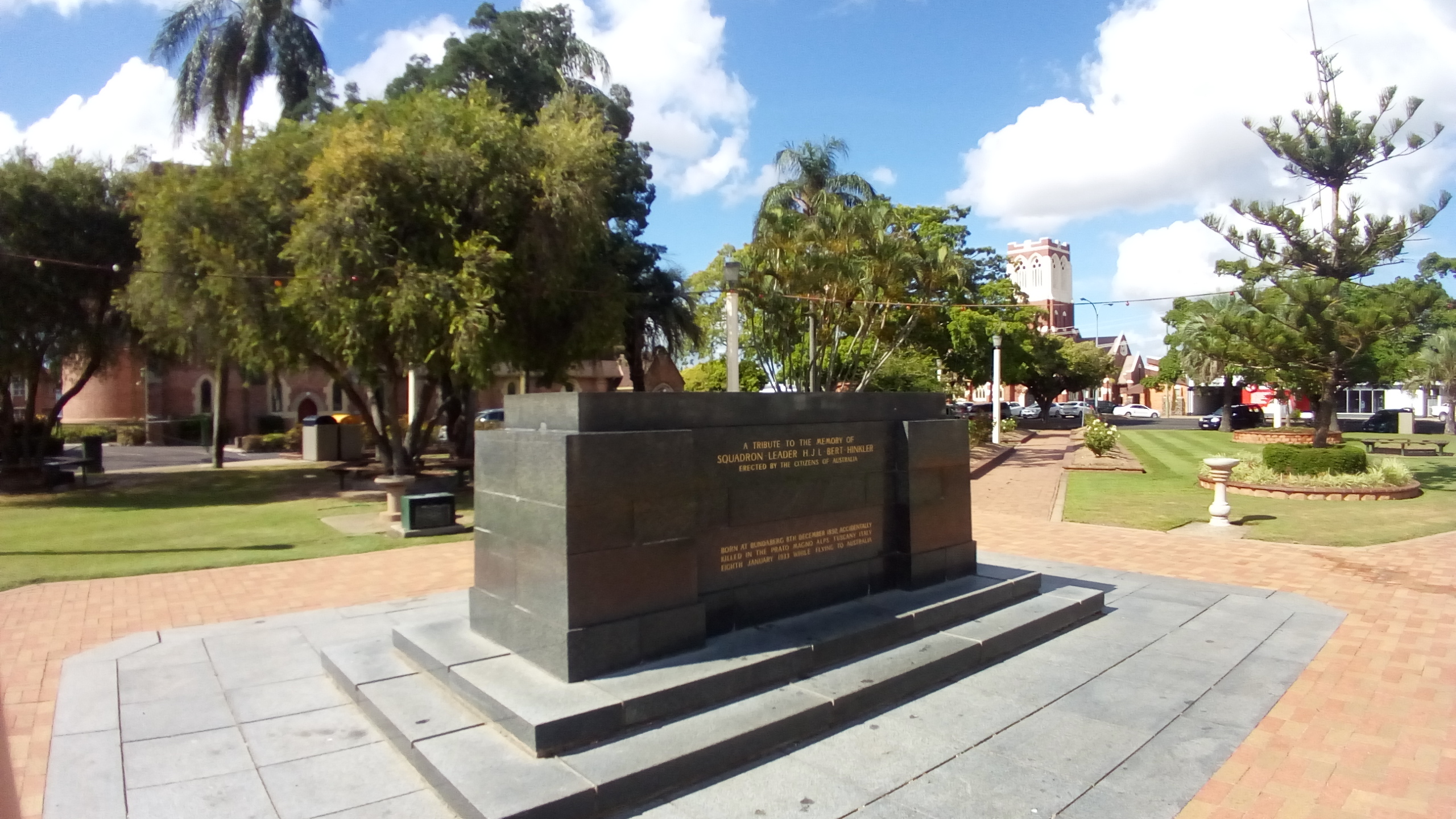
- The cenotaph of Bert Hinkler
- Interactive map of Buss Park
- Type: Park
- Location: Bundaberg Central, Bundaberg, Bundaberg Region, Queensland
- Coordinates: 24°52′01″S 152°20′50″E
- Opened: 1930
- Owner: Bundaberg Regional Council

Buss Park is located in Bundaberg Central, Bundaberg, Bundaberg Region, Queensland, Australia. It borders the Anglican Christ Church and the Bundaberg Regional Council offices and contains several memorials. The centrepiece of the landscaped gardens is the granite cenotaph to pioneer aviator Bert Hinkler.

As at December 2017, the Bundaberg Region Heritage Register is yet to be finalised but Buss Park has been recommended for inclusion by the final report of the Bundaberg Region Heritage Study.

== Etymology ==
The park was named, when it opened, in 1930 after Frederic Buss, an early pioneer, who gave a generous donation to beautify the city in 1888.

=== Namesake ===
Frederic William Buss, (1845–1926) migrated to Queensland in 1863 from Kent in England, establishing Buss & Turner department store in 1888 on Bourbon Street, Bundaberg. Buss's business empire expanded into commercial real estate and eventually he was to become an influential figure in the local sugar industry, including production refining and distilling in his portfolio of interests. Although he was active in local politics, taking his place in both the chamber of commerce and the municipal council, Buss declined to take a seat in the Queensland Parliament, instead concentrating on local affairs. In 1888 Buss donated £500 towards the beautification of Bundaberg culminating in the heritage-listed Weeping figs that lined the main street of the town.

== History ==
The site originally opened as a school reserve in 1875. After the school relocated the site was known as 'market reserve' which deteriorated over time. In the 1920s the reserve was known as an eyesore, so by the 1930s the council redeveloped the site into a park.

=== Hinkler Memorial ===
In 1936 the Governor-General of Australia Lord Gowrie unveiled a Grecian style cenotaph commemorating Bundaberg born aviator Bert Hinkler. The memorial weighs 40 tonne and was built at an approximate value of £1500. The inscription on the front reads:

A tribute to the memory of Squadron-Leader H.J.L – Bert – Hinkler. Erected by the citizens of Australia. Born at Bundaberg 8th December 1892, accidentally killed in the Prato Magno Alps Tuscany Italy Eighth January 1933 while flying to Australia

The rear of the memorial reads:

Principal Flights First solo flight from Great Britain to Australia First flight across South Atlantic Ocean from west to east

== See also ==
- Bourbong Street Weeping Figs
