= St Andrew's Church, Bundaberg =

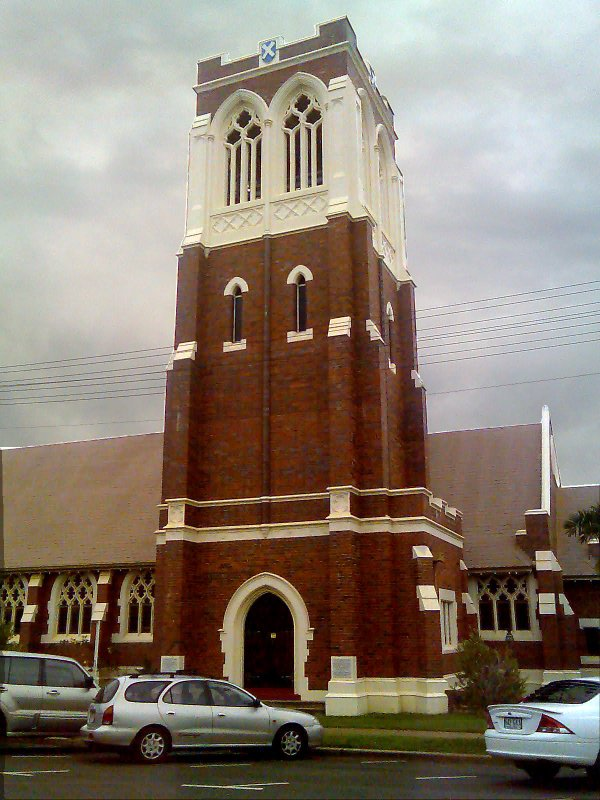
- St Andrew's Church, 2006
- St Andrew's Church, Bundaberg
- 24°52′03″S 152°20′47″E
- Address: corner of Maryboroughand Woongarra Streets, Bundaberg Central, Bundaberg, Bundaberg Region, Queensland
- Country: Australia
- Denomination: Seventh-day Adventist
- Previous denomination: Uniting (1977–2004); Presbyterian (1932–1977)
- Website: standrewssda.com.au

History
- Status: Church
- Founded: 24 October 1931
- Dedication: Saint Andrew
- Dedicated: 3 September 1932

Architecture
- Functional status: Active
- Architect: Lange Leopold Powell
- Architectural type: Church
- Style: Gothic Revival
- Years built: 1931–c. 1940
- Construction cost: A£12,000

Specifications
- Length: 35 metres (115 ft)
- Width: 12 metres (41 ft)
- Height: 22 metres (71 ft)

Queensland Heritage Register
- Official name: St Andrew's Uniting Church
- Type: State heritage (built, landscape)
- Designated: 3 August 2004
- Reference no.: 602489
- Significant period: 1930s (historical); 1930s–ongoing (social); 1930s (fabric)
- Significant components: Furniture/fittings, church, views to, stained glass window/s, tower – bell / belfry, garden/grounds, fence/wall – perimeter, trees/plantings
- Builders: Cornelius Johannes Vandenberg

St Andrew's Church is a heritage-listed Seventh-day Adventist Church building at the corner of Maryborough and Woongarra Streets, Bundaberg Central, Bundaberg, Bundaberg Region, Queensland, Australia. It was designed by Lange Leopold Powell and built from 1931 to c. 1940. It was added to the Queensland Heritage Register on 3 August 2004.

Established in 1931 as a Presbyterian church, it became a Uniting church in 1977, and has operated as a Seventh-day Adventist Church since 2004.

== History ==
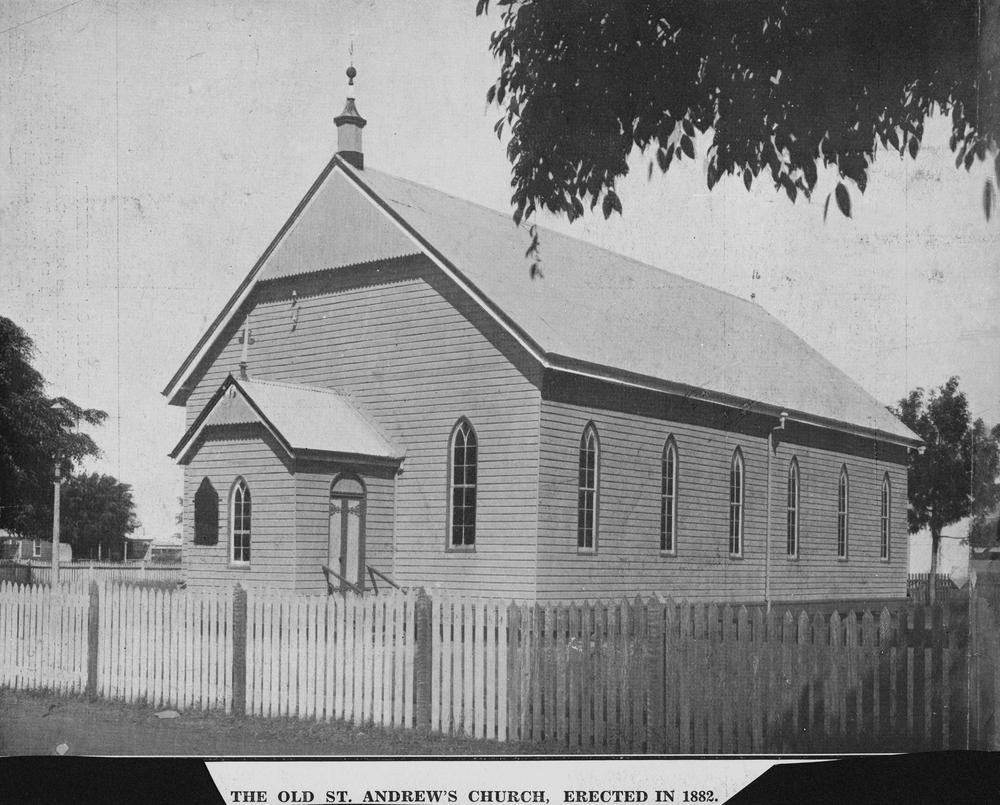
The original St Andrew's Presbyterian Church, c. 1930.

St Andrew's Church, Bundaberg was erected in 1932 as St Andrew's Presbyterian Church and replaced an earlier Presbyterian church erected on the site in 1882. The land had been purchased in 1881 and was held in trust by three senior members of the congregation on behalf of the Presbyterian Church in Bundaberg.

The 1932 church was built largely with funds generated by the Bundaberg Presbyterian community. In 1925 the Bundaberg Presbyterian Women's Guild opened a New Church Fund and over the next six years worked with other Church organisations including the Committee of Management and the Girls Auxiliary to raise A£3,500. Additional fund raising generated another A£2,000 over a six-month period in 1931. The final funds were obtained through a loan of A£3,500 through the Grand Trustees of the Protestant Alliance Friendly Society.

The ability of the Presbyterian congregation of Bundaberg to quickly raise such large sums highlights the relative prosperity of the district's sugar industry during the 1920s, which was sustained into the 1930s. However, construction of the church in the early 1930s was also a local work-generating scheme during a time of economic depression. The Church adopted a deliberate policy to ensure that funds for the construction of the church were spent on local labour and materials; by completion it was estimated that 75% of the construction budget had been spent locally.

Lange L. Powell, a prominent Brisbane architect, designed St Andrew's Presbyterian Church. Powell had designed a number of important structures in Queensland including the Brisbane Masonic Temple and was highly regarded by the time he designed St Andrew's. Powell described St Andrew's as being designed in "broad free gothic style that was reminiscent of the Fourteenth Century", moderated to allow for the sub-tropical climate. All the windows in the bays could be opened and the eaves were carried clear of the main supports to ensure adequate circulation of air.

The design and orientation of the church was also developed to maximize the location and setting. On a corner block directly across the road from Buss Park and the Anglican Church, Powell orientated the Church along Maryborough Street rather than facing it. This maximized the view of the lateral facade and ensured that the tower on the eastern side dominated.

The design was well received by the community and local headlines on the day on which the church was dedicated read "Latest Addition to Bundaberg Architecture". The local press also emphasised that Powell had spent some of his childhood in Bundaberg while his father had served as the town's Methodist Minister. The Queensland Moderator of the Presbyterian Church set the foundation stone during St Andrew's golden jubilee celebrations on 24 October 1931. Powell supervised the construction of the church, which was undertaken by building contractor Cornelius Johannes Vandenberg. The Church was opened and dedicated on 3 September 1932. The total cost was reported as more than £12,000.

Powell designed some of the furniture for the Church and a drive was launched to obtain sponsors for the various pieces and fittings. Many of the internal furnishings were made from silky oak. The three rows of seats on the dais were designed for comfort and a number of variations were considered before the final version was selected. There are also two elaborately carved chairs, one for the Moderator at Communion Services, the other at the pulpit. The communion table and the pulpit itself were also of elaborate design and included panels that bore carved emblems of the Presbyterian Church. The baptismal font had been previously gifted to the community and was transferred from the 1882 church.

The carillon tower was dedicated as a memorial to those members of St Andrew's community who died during the First World War. Such memorials were an important feature of the interwar era as communities came to terms with the loss of significant numbers of young men. This loss was compounded by the absence of graves to visit and at which to commemorate.

The tower contains a "Peal of Bells", the largest of which (the tenor bell) bears the symbol of the burning bush. The tower bells were manufactured by John Taylor & Co in Loughborough, England, and were donated by Miss Amy Ethel Maud Peirson in memory of deceased members of her family. At the time of its construction St Andrew's reputedly was the first Presbyterian Church in Australia, and one of only seven Presbyterian Churches in the world, to have a carillon. It was also believed to be the first Presbyterian Church in Australia to have a bell that bore the Presbyterian symbol of the burning bush. The bells have since become a local feature and their ring can be heard throughout the central business district and surrounding suburbs.

In the early 1970s the congregation of St Andrew's Presbyterian Church at Bundaberg considered whether to join the Union of Churches that was to become the Uniting Church in Australia. After some debate, the majority of parishioners voted in favour of the proposal, with the official Church Union taking place in 1977. A contingent of the congregation voted to continue as Presbyterian. Lacking sufficient numbers to retain St Andrew's, they relocated to a smaller former Methodist Church.

In 2004, the church was sold to the Seventh Day Adventist Church.

== Description ==
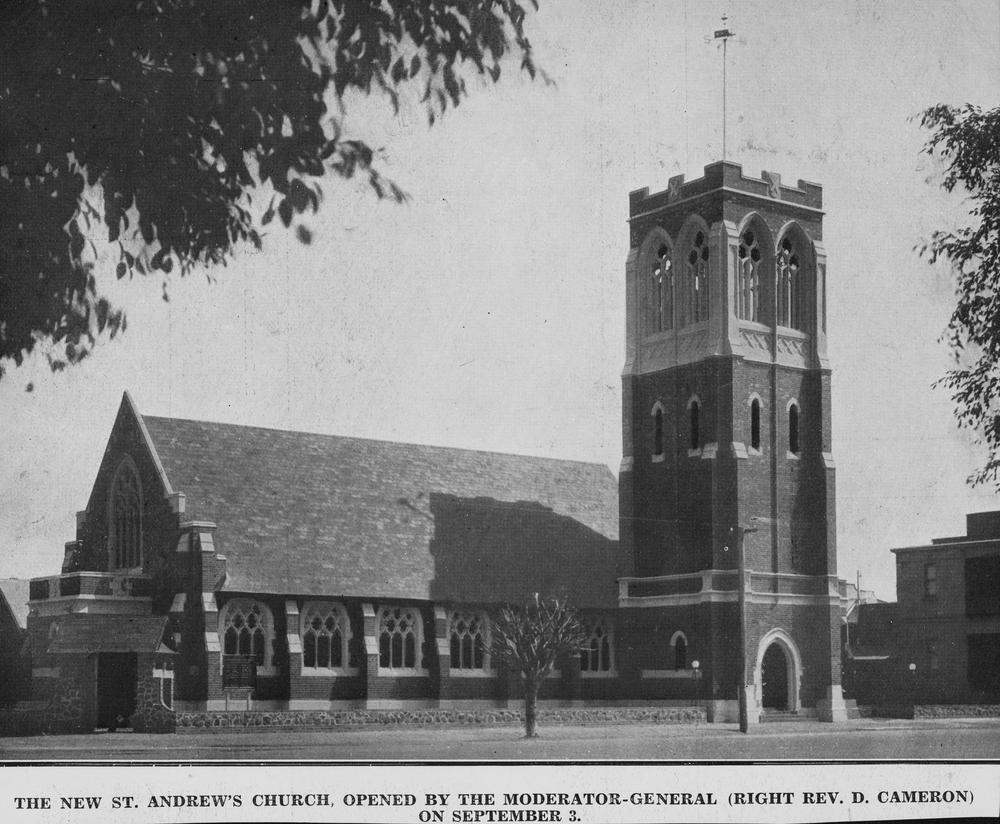
Exterior of St Andrew's Church, 1932

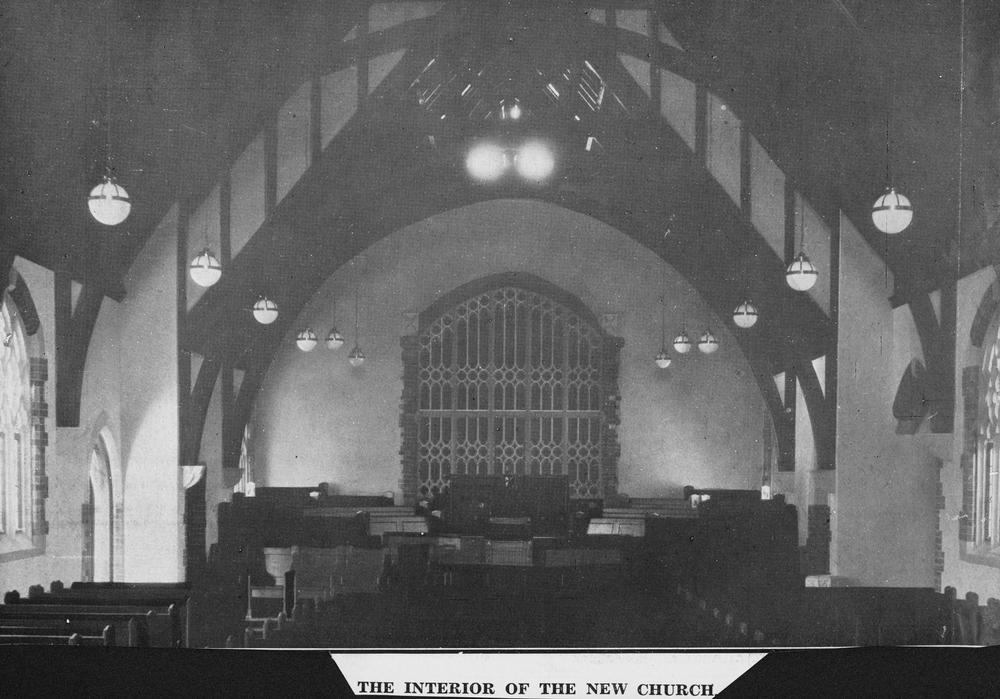
Interior of St Andrew's Church, 1932

St Andrew's Church at Bundaberg is a substantial brick church located in the heart of the city, at the corner of Maryborough and Woongarra Streets, opposite Buss Park.

Designed in the Gothic Revival style, the body of the church is cruciform in shape and is positioned north–south such that the sanctuary faces north. The building is constructed of variegated and multi-coloured bricks, with decorative cement dressings on the external walls. The roof is clad with fibrous-cement tiles. The building is laid on a cement foundation and its maximum overall dimensions are 35 by 12 metres (115 by 41 ft).

A carillon tower of "battlement design", attached to the eastern side of the building, dominates the building. The tower measures 22 metres (71 ft) in height and slightly tapers toward the top. Each face of the tower has decorative arched openings and is crowned with the cross of St Andrew on the middle battlement. The tower contains a carillon, or set of bells, one of which bears the emblem of the burning bush and a dedication to the memory of members of the Pierson family. A First World War Honour Board is located in the tower entry and later memorials have been added.

At the southern end of the church is the official main entry. Above the entry is a large stained glass window that consists of four large panels crowned by seven crosses; the whole arrangement is set within an arch. There are six stained glass windows along either side of the nave, set between the buttresses. Exposed arched trusses in dark stained pine support the roof structure and dominate the internal ceiling.

The dais contains a number of wooden furnishings have been carved from silky oak timber. The furnishings include purpose-designed furniture including three rows of seats, two elaborately carved chairs for the Moderator at Communion Services and the pulpit, the communion table, and the pulpit.

There are two vestries on either side of the dais, one for the Minister on the eastern side, the other for the choir on the western side. Behind the dais is a tracery plaster panel that screens the pipes of the organ. Above this are three small trefoil shaped stained glass windows in a triangular shaped setting.

The eastern and southern boundaries of the property are marked by a low stone fence, with a small roofed gate (reminiscent of a lych gate) at the corner where the two boundaries meet. The gate is made of the same stone as the fence and has a fibrous-cement tiled roof.

Gardens have been established along the sides and southern end of the church. These consist of garden beds along the base of the walls, low set shrubs and a number of small trees. These help to reinforce links with the neighboring Buss Park.

The grounds also contain a former Manse (1957) and a Christian Education Centre (1968). The Manse it is a low set brick structure to the west of the Church. It has been modified in recent years for offices and is not considered to be of cultural heritage significance. The Christian Education Centre is in very close proximity to northern end of the church; it is not considered to be of cultural heritage significance.

== Heritage listing ==
St Andrew's Church was listed on the Queensland Heritage Register on 3 August 2004 having satisfied the following criteria.

The place is important in demonstrating the evolution or pattern of Queensland's history.

St Andrew's Church demonstrates the pattern of Queensland history as the scale and quality of the community-funded building highlights the relative prosperity of the Bundaberg district during the Great Depression of the early 1930s. The funds for the construction were largely raised through community donation, with a substantial percentage raised at a time when other parts of Queensland were economically depressed. The expenditure associated with the construction of the Church was also deliberately focused upon the Bundaberg district to ensure its construction brought local economic benefits and employment opportunities.

It further demonstrates the pattern of Queensland history, as the carillon tower of the Church is an example of a community-based memorial for those who died in military service during the First World War.

The place demonstrates rare, uncommon or endangered aspects of Queensland's cultural heritage.

St Andrew's Church is an uncommon heritage place as it is believed to be the first Presbyterian Church in Australia to have a carillon. At the time of its construction it was also one of only seven Presbyterian Churches in the world to have a peal of bells.

The place is important in demonstrating the principal characteristics of a particular class of cultural places.

The place is also an intact example of a substantial inter-war brick church in Gothic architectural style. Designed by the prominent Brisbane architect, Lange L. Powell, it incorporates many Gothic design features including asymmetrical massing and a tower without a spire.

The place is important because of its aesthetic significance.

The church is aesthetically significant, both externally and internally. The overall design is imposing yet beautiful, with stained glass windows, specifically designed furnishings, and the sound of the bells all contributing. The design and orientation also consciously utilized and complimented the proximity of Buss Park and the Anglican Church.

The place has a strong or special association with a particular community or cultural group for social, cultural or spiritual reasons.

The church is also significant because of its strong associations with the Presbyterian/Uniting community and Bundaberg more generally. A landmark in Bundaberg, St Andrew's has been a focal point of the Presbyterian/Uniting communities' social and spiritual events. The bells have specifically become a local feature.
