= Bundaberg Central, Queensland =

Bundaberg Central
- Suburb
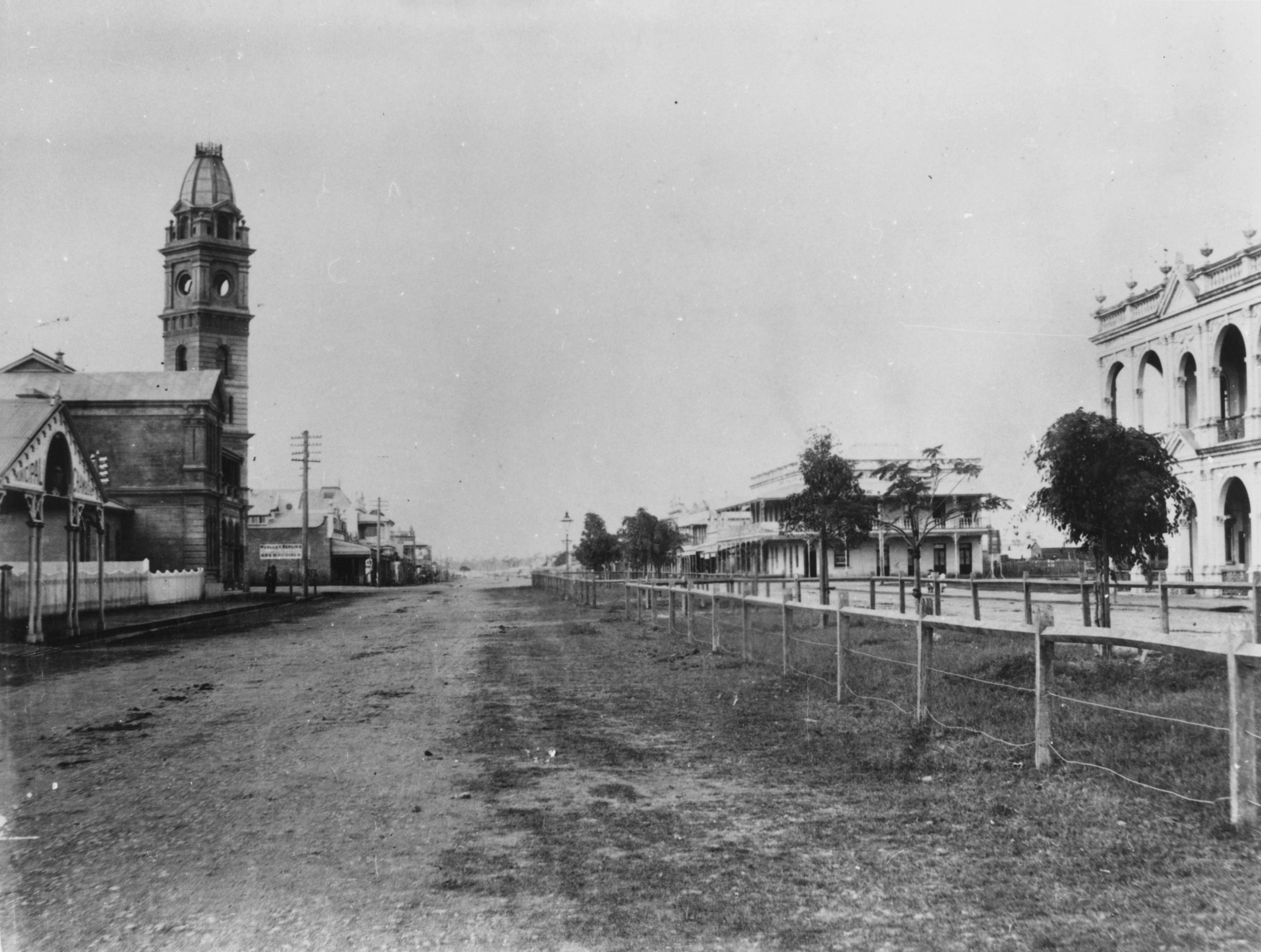
- Bourbong Street Bundaberg, circa 1890

- Interactive map of Bundaberg Central
- Coordinates: 24.8677°S 152.3511°E
- Country: Australia
- State: Queensland
- City: Bundaberg
- LGA: Bundaberg Region
- Location: 112 km (70 mi) NNW of Maryborough; 186 km (116 mi) SE of Gladstone; 287 km (178 mi) SE of Rockhampton; 366 km (227 mi) N of Brisbane

Government
  - State electorate: Bundaberg
  - Federal division: Hinkler

Area
  - Total: 1.3 km^{2} (0.50 sq mi)

Population
  - Total: 162 (2021 census)
  - Density: 125/km^{2} (323/sq mi)
- Time zone: UTC+10:00 (AEST)
- Postcode: 4670
Suburbs around Bundaberg Central
Bundaberg North	Bundaberg North	Bundaberg North
Bundaberg West	Bundaberg Central	Bundaberg East
Bundaberg West	Bundaberg South	Bundaberg South

Bundaberg Central is the central suburb and central business district of Bundaberg in the Bundaberg Region, Queensland, Australia. In the 2021 census, Bundaberg Central had a population of 162 people.

== Geography ==
The suburb is bounded by the Burnett River to the north, Bundaberg Creek to the east, Saltwater Creek to the south and the North Coast railway line to the west.

== History ==
In 1869, a cemetery was established a block bounded by Woongarra, Maryborough, Woondooma and McLean Streets (24.8686°S 152.3465°E). But it was quickly recognised this could not be a long-term option and a new site of 40 acres (16 ha) was reserved for a new cemetery (now within Millbank) and burials commenced there in 1873. In 1881 the deteriorating condition of the old cemetery led to calls to exhume and relocate the burials from the old cemetery to the new, with the rationale that the proceeds of selling the land of the old cemetery would outweigh the cost of relocating the graves. The relocation of the graves was completed by January 1882.

Bundaberg South State School opened on 6 February 1875. On 30 June 1885, it closed and split into two schools: Bundaberg South Boys State School and Bundaberg South Girls and Infants State School. Circa November 1894, both of these schools were renamed to be Bundaberg Central Boys State School and Bundaberg Central Girls and Infants State School. In 1926, the two schools were combined to create Bundaberg Central State School.

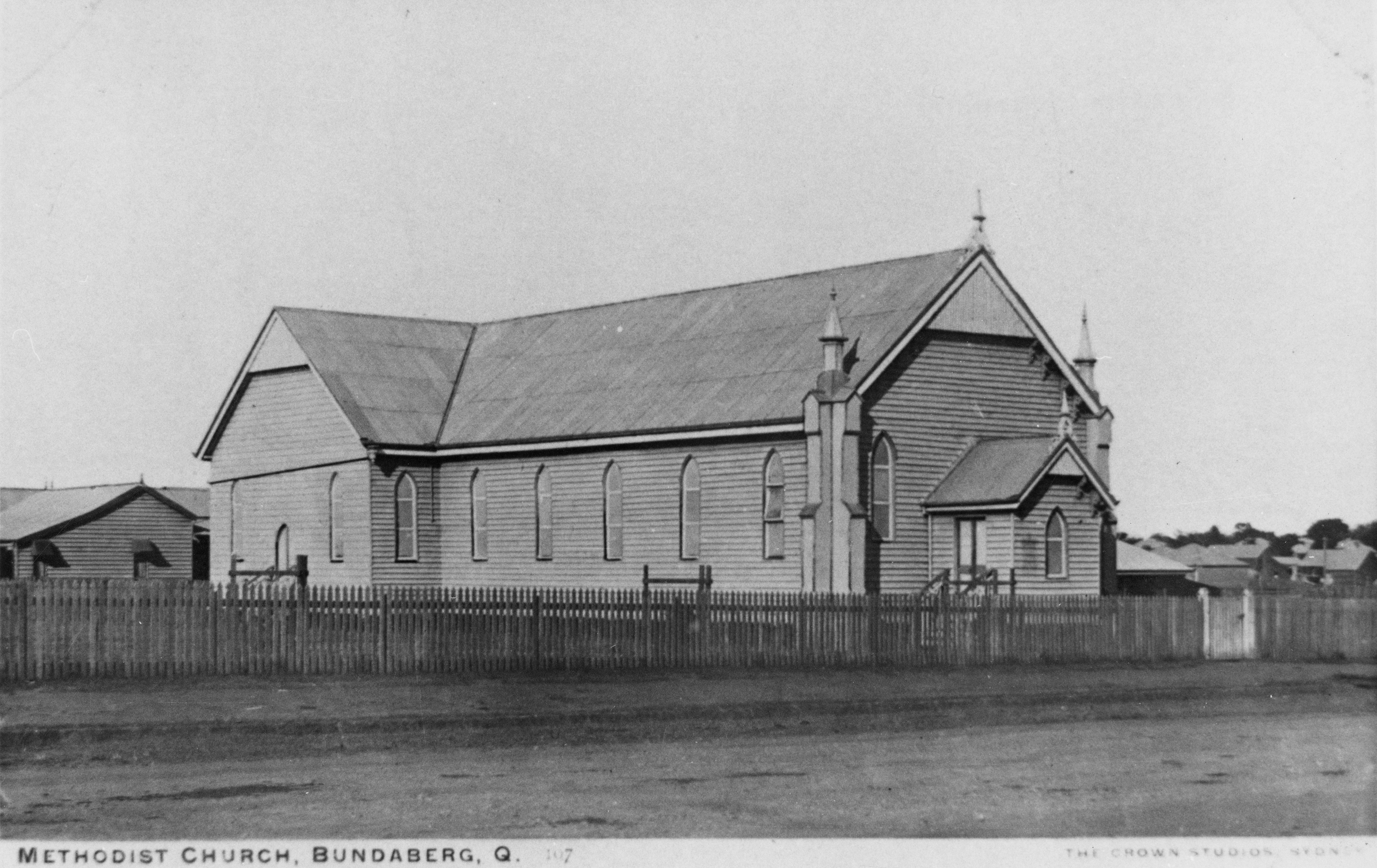
Methodist Church in Barolin Street, created from the physical combination of the Walla Street Primitive Methodist Church and the Wesleyan Methodist Church in Maryborough Street, circa 1908

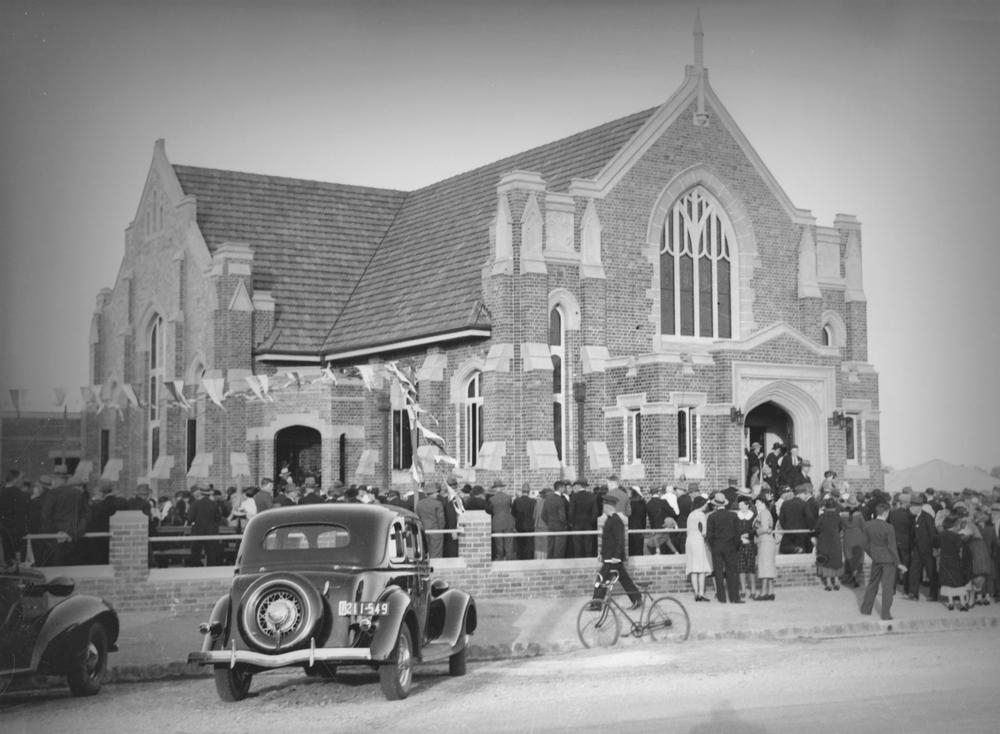
Opening Ceremony of the Bundaberg Methodist Church, 1937

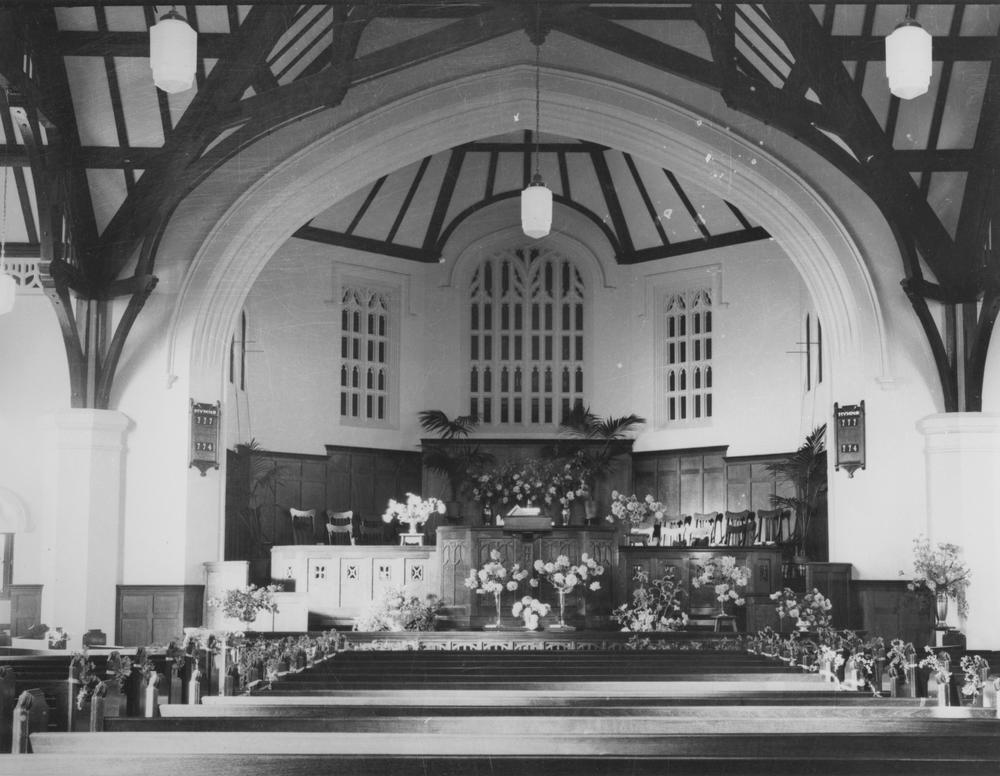
Interior of Bundaberg Methodist Church, 1937

Reverend William NcNaught of the Primitive Methodist Church was appointed as its first minister in Bundaberg. He conducted his first service there on 12 August 1875. A "primitive" slab-and-shingle church was built in Walla Street (which did not keep the rain out). In 1878, Reverend J. Williams became the minister and a new "handsome" church was built on the Walla Street site. In 1882, the Wesleyan Methodist Church commenced services in the Victoria Hall in December 1882, later they used the Congregational Church for their services, and finally they erected their first church at the lower end of Maryborough Street in late 1885. The union of the Methodist denominations occurred in 1902 and the two Methodist churches in Bundaberg were amalgamated in 1904. The two church buildings were then physically relocated to the current site in Barolin Street and joined to accommodate the combined congregations with a stump-capping ceremony held on Thursday 7 April 1904. A parsonage was built beside the combined church in 1908. In 1936, the congregation began to raise funds to build a new brick church building capable of seating 500 people and to be designed by Brisbane architect Walter Kerrison and constructed by C. J. Vandenberg. On Thursday 30 July 1936, the Governor-General Lord Gowrie laid the foundation stone of the new church. On Saturday 7 August 1937, the new church was officially opened by Reverend Hubert Hedley Trigge, the Master of King's College at the University of Queensland. The former combined church building was retained for use as a hall, being replaced by a brick hall in 1964. The church was part of the amalgamation that created the Uniting Church in Australia in 1977, becoming the Bundaberg Uniting Church.

The first Anglican church in Bundaberg was in Quay Street and was completed in March 1876. Christ Church Anglican was consecrated on Sunday 4 April 1880 by Bishop Stanton. In July 1898, it was proposed to relocate the church to a more central site. In 1899, the church building was relocated close to the site of the present church. On Sunday 8 August 1920, the foundation stone for a new church was laid by Bishop Henry Le Fanu. However, it was not until Sunday 20 February 1927 that the new church was opened and dedicated by Archbishop Gerald Sharp. It was consecrated on Sunday 23 February 1936 by Archbishop William Wand.

St Joseph's Catholic School was established in June 1876 by two Sisters of St Joseph of the Sacred Heart. It initially operated in St Mary's Church of the Holy Rosary with student numbers reaching 60 by the end of the first year of operation. Disagreements between Mary McKillop, the leader of the Sisters of St Joseph, and the Catholic bishops in Queensland led to the Sisters of St Joseph leaving Queensland with operation of the school passing in 1897 to five Sisters of Mercy from All Hallows' School in Brisbane. The school relocated in 1908 and then again in 1918 to its current site in Barolin Street adjacent to the Holy Rosary Church. The Sisters of Mercy reduced their involvement with the operation of the school with the first lay principal appointed in 1985.

Christian Brothers College opened a school for Catholic boys in February 1919. It closed in 1983 to amalgamate with Loyola College (a Catholic girls school) to form Shalom College, which commenced operation in 1984 in Norville.

St Patrick’s Convent High School was officially established in 1915 for Catholic girls. In 1981, it was renamed Loyola College. It closed in 1983 to amalgamate with the Christian Brothers College (a Catholic boys school) to form Shalom College, which commenced operation in 1984 in Norville.

Buss Park officially opened on Saturday 20 December 1930 replacing the former Market Square that had been an eyesore for many years. The site had originally been used for the first school. After World War I, there was a proposal to build a memorial hall on the site but this did not come to fruition. Local businessman Horace Buss then donated £500 towards city beautification with a particular desire to see the Market Square be converted into a public park and the park was named in his honour.

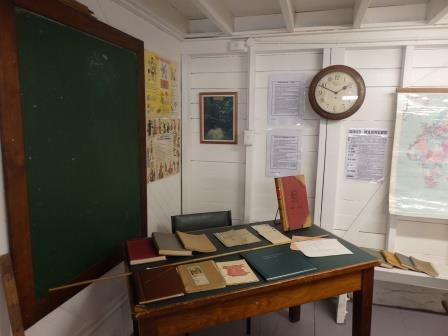
Museum at Bundaberg Central State School, 2015

Following the death of Bundaberg-born aviator Bert Hinker in 1933, a public meeting held in Bundaberg in 1934 decided to honour Hinkler with a monument. A public appeal raised about £1,000 with the Queensland Government donating a further £500. The monument was designed by Brisbane architect RP Cummings and was built by Messrs A Armitage & CoIt in the centre of Buss Park. It required about 40 tons of granite quarried at Gracemere. On 30 July 1936, it was officially unveiled by the Governor-General Lord Gowrie in front of a crowd of 3,000 people.

The Bundaberg Library opened in 1994 with a major refurbishment in 2012.

In 2015, Bundaberg Central State School established a museum in a former storeroom.

== Demographics ==
in the 2006 census, Bundaberg Central had a population of 256 people.

In the 2016 census, Bundaberg Central had a population of 316 people.

In the 2021 census, Bundaberg Central had a population of 162 people.

== Heritage listings ==
Bundaberg Central has a number of heritage-listed sites, including:

- Bourbong Street Weeping Figs, Bourbong Street
- Bundaberg War Memorial, Bourbong Street
- Kennedy Bridge, Bourbong Street
- Bundaberg Post Office, 155a Bourbong Street
- Bundaberg School of Arts, 184 Bourbong Street
- Commercial Bank, 191–193 Bourbong Street
- Bundaberg Central State School, 13 Crofton Street
- Fallon House, 1 Maryborough Street
- St Andrews Uniting Church, corner of Maryborough and Woongarra Streets
- Bundaberg Police Station, Quay Street
- Burnett Bridge, Quay Street
- Saltwater Creek Railway Bridge, Quay Street
- 4BU Radio Station, 55 Woongarra Street
- Christ Church Anglican, corner of Woongarra and Maryborough streets

== Education ==
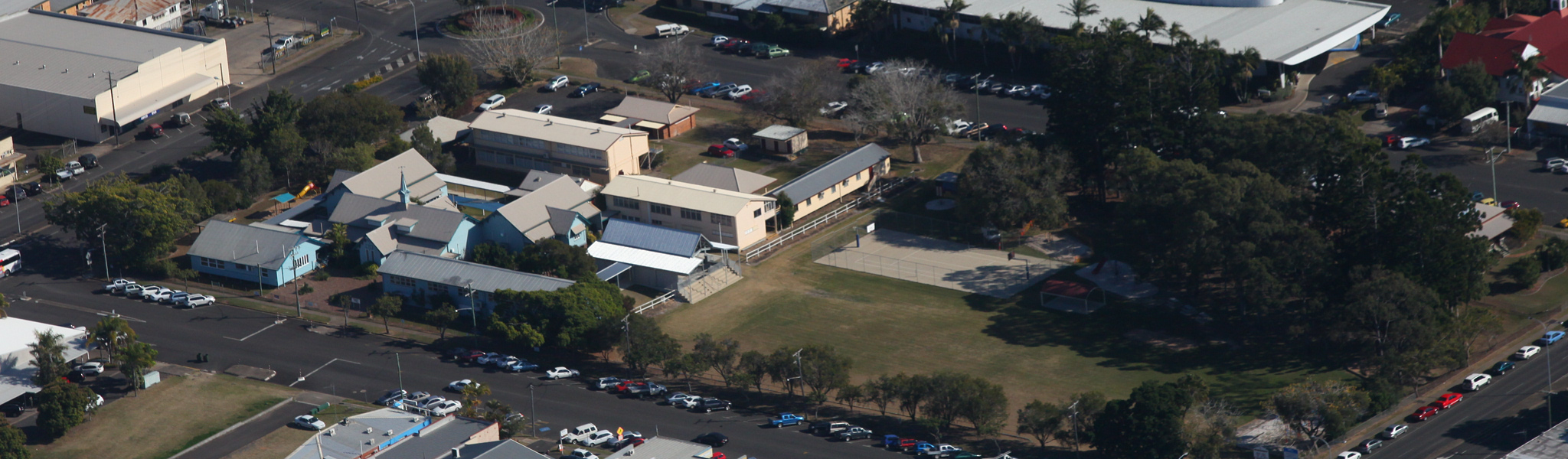
Aerial view of Bundaberg Central State School, 2022

Bundaberg Central State School is a government primary (Prep–6) school for boys and girls at 13 Crofton Street (24.8698°S 152.3482°E). In 2018, the school had an enrolment of 75 students with 6 teachers (5 full-time equivalent) and 11 non-teaching staff (7 full-time equivalent).

St Joseph's Catholic Primary School is a Catholic primary (Prep–6) school for boys and girls at the corner of Barolin and Woondooma Streets (24.8681°S 152.3500°E). In 2018, the school had an enrolment of 162 students with 15 teachers (12 full-time equivalent) and 10 non-teaching staff (4 full-time equivalent).

There are no government secondary schools in Bundaberg Central. The nearest government secondary school is Bundaberg State High School in neighbouring Bundaberg South to the south.

== Amenities ==
The Bundaberg Regional Council operates a public library at 49 Woondooma Street.

The Bundaberg branch of the Queensland Country Women's Association meets at the QCWA Hall at 15 Quay Street, Bundaberg Central. The Hinkler branch of the Queensland Country Women's Association meets at the McDonalds Central Bundaberg on the corner of Woongarra & Targo Street, Bundaberg Central.

Christ Church Anglican is on the corner of Woongarra and Maryborough Streets (24.8675°S 152.3473°E). Services are conducted on five days each week.

Bundaberg Uniting Church is at 34 Barolin Street (24.8703°S 152.3506°E).

== Attractions ==
Buss Park is on the corner of Bourbong Street and Maryborough Street (24.8669°S 152.3474°E). It contains a memorial to Bert Hinkler.
