= Bundaberg Police Station =

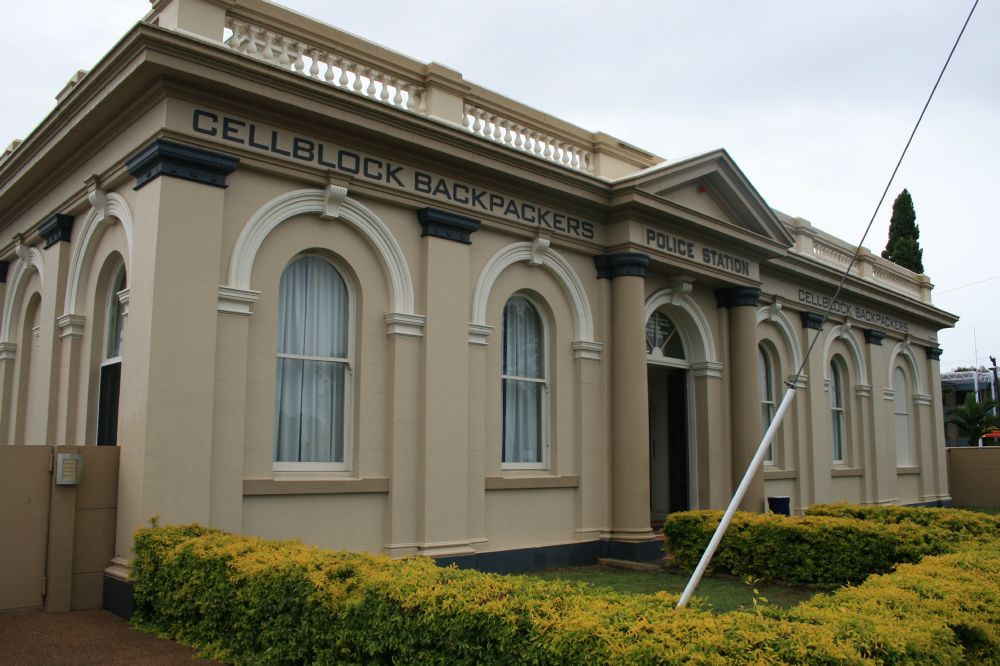
- Former Bundaberg Police Station, 2009

- Location within Queensland Location within Australia
- 24.8658°S 152.3468°E
- Location: Quay Street, Bundaberg Central, Bundaberg, Bundaberg Region, Queensland, Australia

History
- Design period: 1870s–1890s (late 19th century)
- Built: 1882–1958

Queensland Heritage Register
- Official name: Bundaberg Police Station Complex (former), Bundaberg Court House, Bundaberg Police Station
- Type: state heritage (built)
- Designated: 1 December 1998
- Reference no.: 601762
- Significant period: 1880s, 1930s (historical); 1880s, 1900s, 1930s (fabric)
- Significant components: residential accommodation – police sergeant's house/quarters, court house, cell block, lock-up

Bundaberg Police Station is a heritage-listed former court house (1882–1958) and former police station (1958–1997) at Quay Street, Bundaberg Central, Bundaberg, Bundaberg Region, Queensland, Australia. It was built from 1882 to 1958. It is also known as Bundaberg Court House. It was added to the Queensland Heritage Register on 1 December 1998.

== History ==
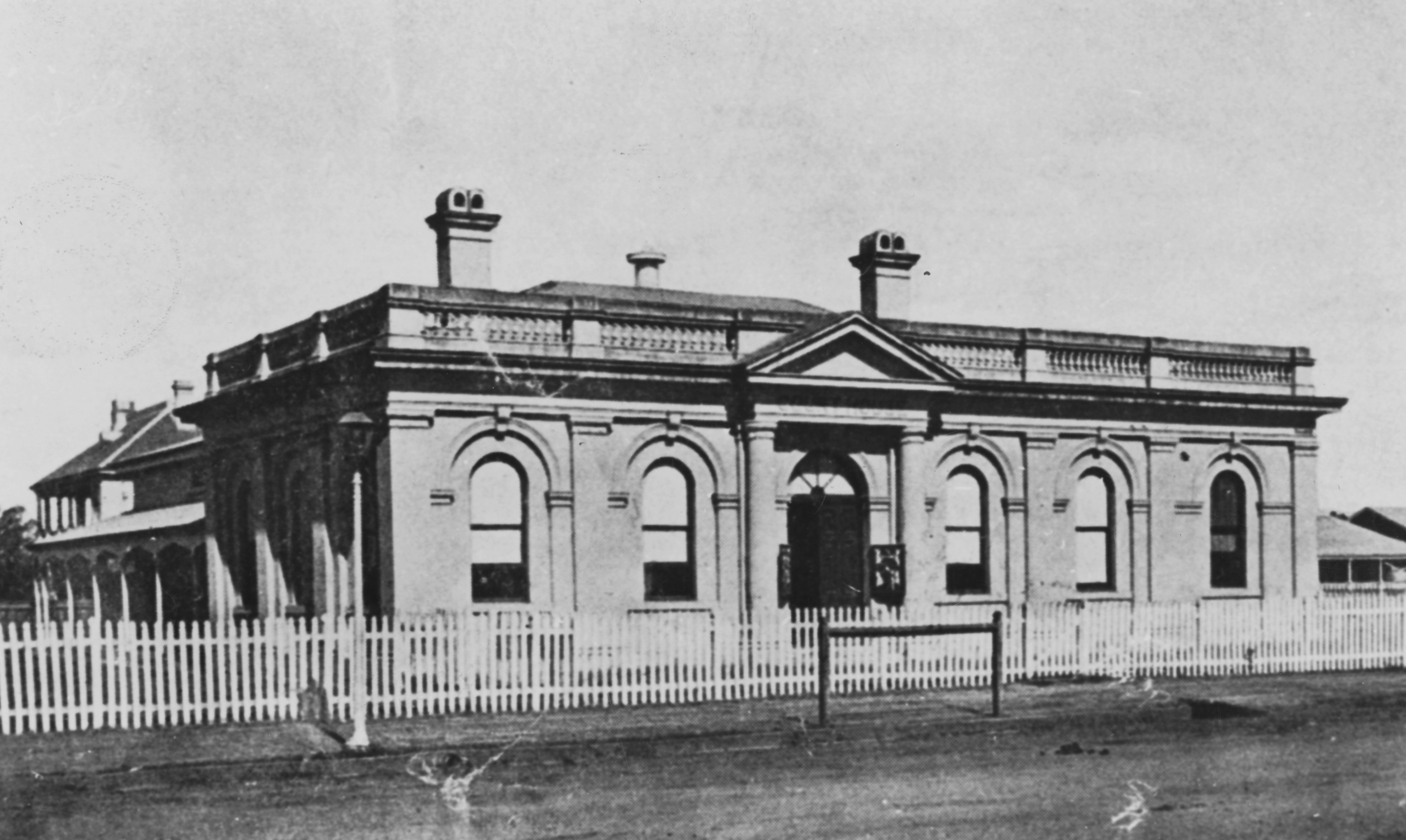
Bundaberg Court House, circa 1910

The former Bundaberg Police Station complex is located at the corner of Maryborough and Quay Streets and addresses Quay Street. The former Bundaberg Court House is a rendered masonry and timber building constructed between 1882 and 1884. The former lock-up keepers quarters, a single-storeyed brick and timber building and the lockup, a single-storeyed L-shaped brick building, were constructed in 1900 as part of a larger police complex that included the now-demolished two-storeyed brick Police Station.

Bundaberg was first settled in the mid-1860s by timber cutters, with saw milling operative at Baffle Creek by 1866. John and Gavin Steuart secured a 320-acre land selection for timber and saw milling activities and other settlers followed. Leases for agricultural purposes followed the timber getting, with sugar plantations and maize cropping eventually taking precedence in the cleared areas. Agricultural settlement was encouraged by the Queensland government under the Coffee and Sugar Regulations of the 1860 Crown Lands Alienation Act. The first town survey for Bundaberg, situated on the Burnett River, was completed in 1869, ultimately establishing it as a service centre with harbour and port facilities for the agricultural and mineral products of the area. During the following decade, the sugar industry consolidated and a general economic boom in Queensland in the 1880s enhanced the local sugar boom. During the 1880s the Millaquin, Fairymead and Bingera sugar refineries were established providing the necessary infrastructure for the success of the fledgling industry. Thomas McIlwraith, Queensland Premier and Colonial Treasurer 1879–83 represented the electorate of Mulgrave, incorporating Bundaberg, during this period of growth.

The sugar industry and the township of Bundaberg increased in both demographic size and political influence during the late nineteenth century, stimulating the demand for public buildings that reflected this affluence. The Bundaberg Court House was originally designed as a smaller timber building, however, a larger brick building was the resultant design from the Department of Public Works and Housing, more befitting to the political importance and economic stature of Bundaberg.

Bundaberg Court House was designed by George St Paul Connolly, acting Queensland Colonial Architect in the Queensland Department of Public Works. Connolly joined the Department in 1872 and worked on both public and private buildings, under the direction of Colonial Architect F.D.G. Stanley. In 1885 he was appointed Queensland Colonial Architect, a position he held until 1891.

The Bundaberg Court House followed the "T" shape design developed during the nineteenth century. The major consideration in the design and planning of the Bundaberg Court House was the allowance for the correct movement of people in the building and the separation of the different groups involved in the judicial process. The verandahs at the rear of the building allowed for specific delineated entrances to the buildings. Jurors and barristers entered the court house by an alternative route to the public on their way to the public spaces. The judges had a private entrance and lobby via the rear verandah. The prisoners would be brought directly from the police cells to the court room through the side verandah door, from the nearby police reserve.

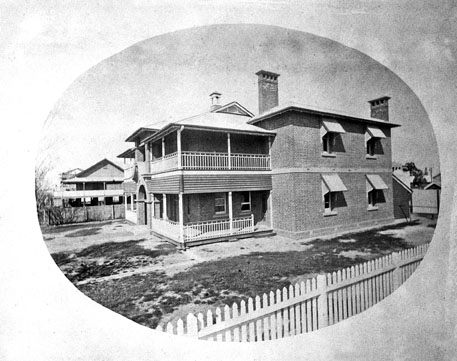
Early Bundaberg Police Station (now demolished)

In 1900 the police took occupation of the adjacent lots to the Bundaberg Court House, previously occupied by the Lands office and the Customs House and Bond Store. Police had occupied smaller accommodation adjacent to these sites, but separated from the court house. A grand two storey brick Police Station, a lock-up keepers residence and cell block were built providing for the close spatial relationship between the dual arms of justice administration that regularly operated in police/court precincts throughout the state. This proximity facilitated the movement of prisoners between the remand centre and the court proceedings, enhancing security and reducing risk of problems for police during the transfer from one justice venue to the other.

In 1935 the Court House underwent extensions and renovations that included the addition of a strong room, and addition of extra office space and amenities for judges and jurors at the rear of the building. The office of the Clerk of Petty Sessions was enlarged by removal of two fireplaces and an internal wall.

The 1950s heralded a boom period for the City of Bundaberg, with population growing by one third from 15,926 in 1947 to 21,235 in 1957. Advances had been made in the production and marketing of sugar were coupled with the development of the new Port of Bundaberg, the third in Queensland to operate bulk handling facilities. The new port opened in 1958 and was built downstream from the original wharves at Burnett Heads. This prosperity was combined with a general building boom that was reflected in the upgrading of various public buildings including the Bundaberg Court House.

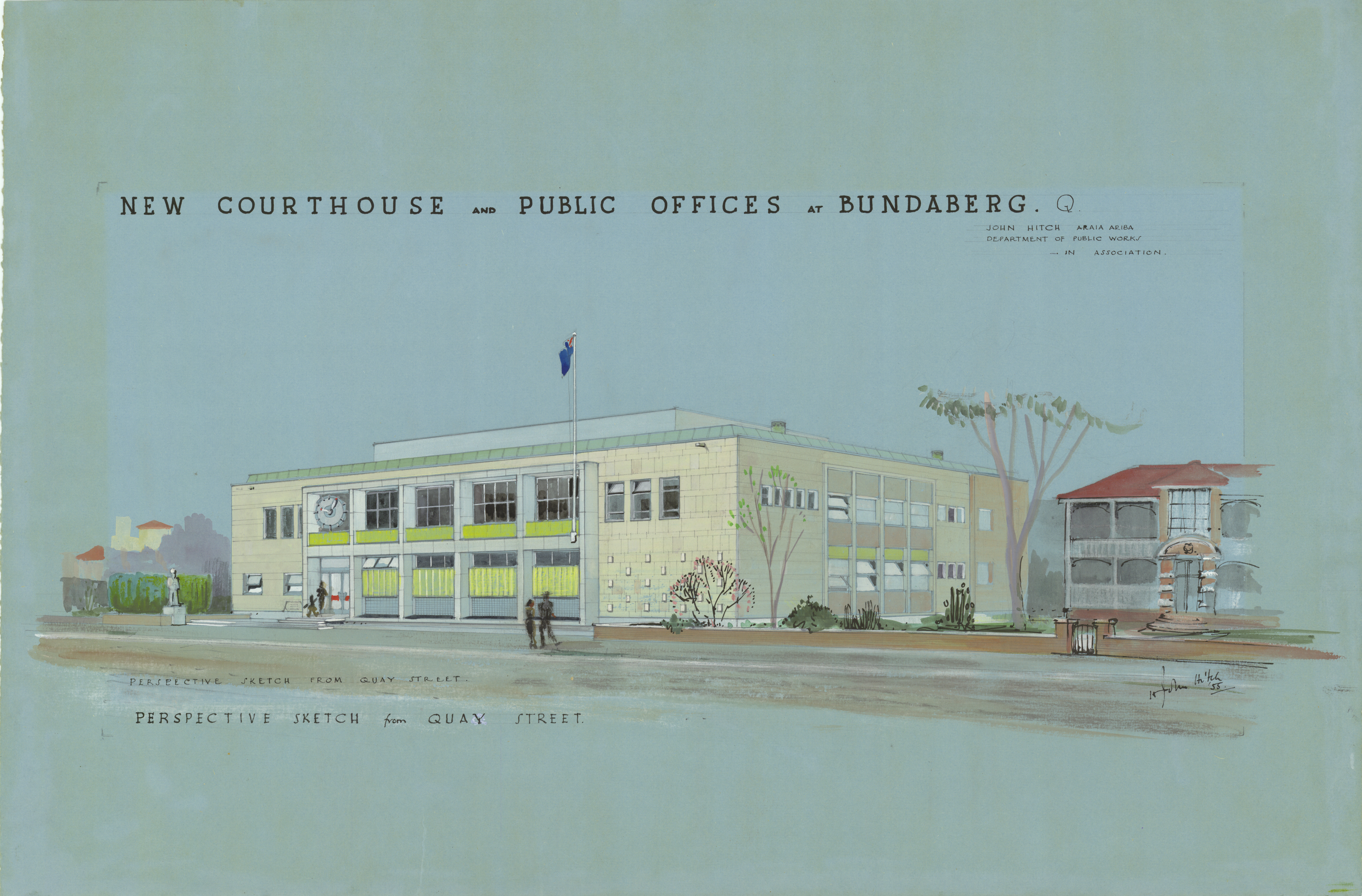
Architectural perspective from Quay Street of the 1958 court house

In 1958 a new larger modern Court House was constructed in Quay Street, adjacent to the 1900 Police Station building and facing Anzac Park situated on the banks of the Burnett River. At this time the original court house was remodelled to accommodate the Police Service. The major alteration to the building was the reorganisation of the court room space to provide four new offices and the addition of a recreation room and other amenities at the rear of the building. Various outbuildings including wash houses, toilets, motor garages, horse stables and bicycle sheds were also located on the site at this time. The aggregate police site included the 1882–1884 Court House, and the 1900 Police Station, lock up keepers residence, the cell block, providing a range of official and residential accommodation for the police service.

Since the inception of the Queensland police force in the nineteenth century, the police lived and worked within the boundary of the police reserve. The former Bundaberg Police Station complex reflected the arrangement of the living and working conditions that still prevailed until the mid-twentieth century. The location of barracks and other quarters on the same site as the police station provided an obvious law and order presence within the Bundaberg community at all times. This arrangement provided public access to the police force both day and night.

The lock up keepers residence was built as part of the original 1900 Police Station, maintaining the congruity of form and design in the combination of timber, iron and brick materials. The design was typical of turn of the century government accommodation incorporating two bedrooms, living room, kitchen, bathroom and front and rear verandas. In 1940 a charge room was added to the building and in 1962, a laundry and internal toilet were attached. As onsite residencies became redundant, the building was used for office space to complement the main Police Station housed in the former Court House.

The original 1900 brick cell block consisted of six cells, with one padded cell and one larger communal cell. A concrete verandah with timber trim and balustrade ran the length of the building. A chain link stockade fence separated this area from the rest of the reserve and allowed for prisoners' exercise yard. In 1940, toilet and shower facilities were added at the eastern end of the building. A charge room was added to the building in 1952 and chain link wire was used to enclose the verandah portion of the cell block.

The 1900 Police Station was demolished in 1985, government offices now stand in its place.

In 1997, the Bundaberg court returned to the original court house while renovations of the 1958 building were undertaken. The central court room was refurbished when subdividing partitions were removed to reveal the original volume and detailing and it was restored to its original use.

In 2015, the building is being used as the Cellblock Backpackers.

== Description ==
The former Bundaberg Police Station Complex is a single storey rendered brick building, situated on the corner of Quay and Maryborough Streets and oriented towards the Burnett River.

The building has a rectangular floor plan with a corrugated steel hipped roof behind a parapet which faces Quay Street and returns down the sides of the building to flanking verandahs that spring from below the soffit of the main roof and run down each side of the building. The eastern verandah is partially enclosed. The verandahs are supported on timber posts with decorated capitals and a vertical boarded scalloped valance to form a Tudor arch. The verandah originally ran across the rear of the building but has subsequently been enclosed when the rear of the building was extended. Several other stages of additions are evident.

The principal facade is asymmetric about the main entrance and retains the original entrance doors and half lite above and an extended masonry pediment over supported by round columns with Doric capitals. Two round-headed double hung windows are located on the east side of the main entrance and are framed by piers with moulded capitals. To the west the building has been extended in replicated detail when a strong room was added in 1935. The architrave of the windows is in relief from the surrounding wall surface and has a hood mould and keystone over which springs off recessed piers with moulded imposts. The strongroom window has vertical bars and the other walls are blank.

An entablature connects the pediment over the front entrance and returns down the sides of the building. Above this is a balustrade parapet with hourglass balusters. Original chimneys survive in the north eastern corner and at the rear of the building.

Access to the building is via a central hall from Quay Street which has a pair of flanking offices on the eastern side. Original fireplaces exist in both these rooms. On the west side of the hall is a single room which was created in 1935 when the strongroom was added. The hall leads, via a single door, to the Court Room which has an extended wall height to create a lofty space. This has recently been refurbished when subdividing partitions were removed to reveal the original volume and detailing. French doors with semi-circular over lights and three round-headed double hung windows open onto the side verandahs. Over each opening to the verandahs are high level narrow casement windows. The ceiling rakes from the walls to a line with the collar tie of the heavy timber trusses.

To the east of the Court House is a single-storey brick residence. The original plan form of this building is an "L" with an attached square room at the rear that was originally the Charge Room. The building has hipped roofs which have wide eaves with exposed timber frame soffits and are clad in corrugated galvanised iron. It has a timber front verandah which has been enclosed. The verandah roof is contiguous with the main roof. The west side displays three double hung windows that have prominent hoods which have diagonal timber sides and corrugated iron roofs. A flat-roofed brick addition has been made to the east verandah. Internally the building retains its original configuration with a main living room off the front verandah and three rooms down the western side with the Charge Room off the east verandah. The laundry addition is accessed down stairs off the east verandah.

To the south and the rear of the residence and to the east of the former Court House is a single-storey brick cell block. This building has a narrow L-shaped plan form with a gabled corrugated clad roof and small high level barred windows on the north and east sides. A low pitched verandah with security screening is on the north side. The building was originally documented to have three four cells but appears to have been constructed with five. A charge room was added to the north west corner in the 1950s.

== Heritage listing ==
The former Bundaberg Police Station complex was listed on the Queensland Heritage Register on 1 December 1998 having satisfied the following criteria.

The place is important in demonstrating the evolution or pattern of Queensland's history.

The former Bundaberg Police Station Complex consists of a single-storeyed masonry building constructed in 1882–1884 and a single-storeyed lock up keepers residence and cell block constructed in 1900. The scale and form of the buildings demonstrates the importance of Bundaberg as regional service centre for the sugar industry and other primary production activities in the Burnett region.

The place is important in demonstrating the principal characteristics of a particular class of cultural places.

The principal building of the reserve was used as the Bundaberg Court House from 1882 to 1958 and Police Station from 1958 to 1997, demonstrating the evolving patterns of justice administration, influenced by two distinct stages of prosperity in the history of Bundaberg and Queensland. The 1900 lock up keepers quarters and the cell blocks, remnants of a larger police reserve, demonstrates the close spatial and working relationship between the dual arms of justice administration.

The place is important because of its aesthetic significance.

The former Bundaberg Police Station Complex is aesthetically dominated by the former Bundaberg Court House, designed to operate with a grand street presence. The complex forms an integral part of a precinct of government buildings including the 1958 Bundaberg Court House and the 1985 Waldren building, providing an eclectic streetscape of modern and traditional buildings, with both grand and domestic scale.

The place has a special association with the life or work of a particular person, group or organisation of importance in Queensland's history.

The former Bundaberg Police Station Complex has a special association with acting Colonial Architect George St. Paul Connolly, of the Queensland Department of Public Works, as an example of his work during the 1880s.

The former Bundaberg Police Station Complex has a special association with Queensland police and judiciary, demonstrating the evolution of work practices and the changing nature of the lifestyle specifically associated with police force employment in a major regional centre.
