= Bundaberg School of Arts =

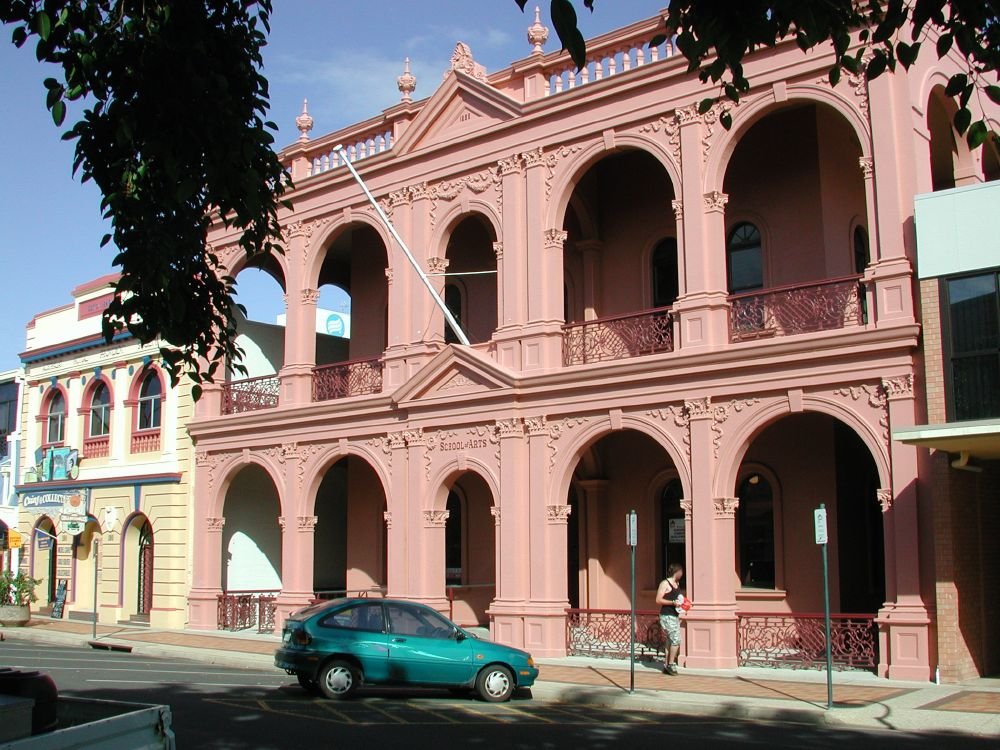
- Bundaberg School of Arts

- Location within Queensland Location within Australia
- 24.8667°S 152.3484°E
- Location: 184 Bourbong Street, Bundaberg Central, Bundaberg, Bundaberg Region, Queensland, Australia

History
- Design period: 1870s–1890s (late 19th century)
- Built: 1888–1889

Site notes
- Architect: Anton Hettrich
- Architectural style: Classicism

Queensland Heritage Register
- Official name: Bundaberg School of Arts
- Type: state heritage (built)
- Designated: 21 October 1992
- Reference no.: 600362
- Significant period: 1889–1940s (historical); 1880s–1890s (fabric); 1889–1940s (social)
- Significant components: decorative features, verandahs – arcaded, school of arts

Bundaberg School of Arts is a heritage-listed former school of arts and now community centre at 184 Bourbong Street, Bundaberg Central, Bundaberg, Bundaberg Region, Queensland, Australia. It was designed by Anton Hettrich and built from 1888 to 1889. It was added to the Queensland Heritage Register on 21 October 1992.

== History ==
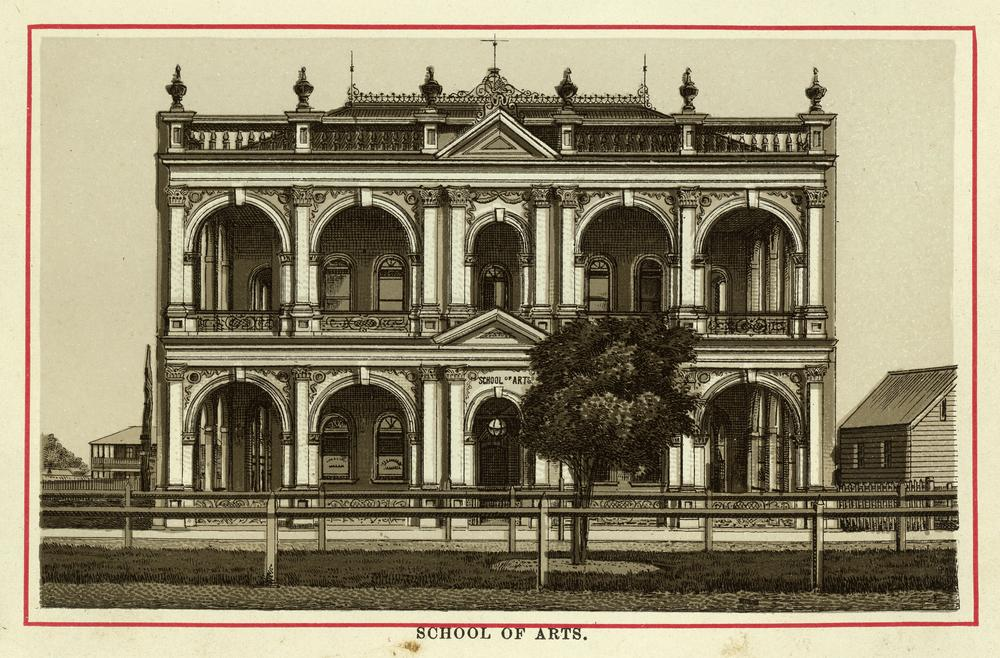
Bundaberg School of Arts, circa 1894

The former School of Arts is a substantial masonry building in classical revival style and was constructed in 1888–1889 as the third school of arts building on this site.

The Burnett area, in which Bundaberg lies, was first settled by Europeans in the 1840s and 1850s as a series of pastoral runs. In the late 1860s, as good agricultural land around Maryborough began to be scarce, agriculturalists and timbergetters became interested in land on the navigable Burnett River to the north. The foundation settlers of Bundaberg selected land in 1867–68 under the "Sugar and Coffee Regulations" stemming from the Crown Lands Alienation Act of the 1860s which aimed to promote agriculture and closer settlement. The site of Bundaberg was officially surveyed in 1869. Coastal traffic grew, and copper was first mined at Mount Perry in 1871, which enabled Bundaberg to develop as a port and supply centre, in spite of competition from Maryborough for this trade. Although the higher southern bank of the river was officially surveyed as the town site, both sides soon developed wharves and buildings and were initially linked by ferry, then by bridges in the 1870s. Sugar plantations were established in the surrounding area and were to become the basis for the city's wealth as the industry boomed from the 1880s to the 1920s.

In 1871, three allotments in Section 20 at the corner of Bourbong and Barolin Streets were reserved for a School of Arts. At this time the population of Bundaberg was about 100. Shortly afterwards, the institution opened in a simple weatherboard structure with little pretension to style, but which had a reading room and a library composed largely of fiction books. It was also used as a venue for meetings and for church services.

The first Mechanics' Institutes or Schools of Arts were established in Britain in the early 1800s and were intended to assist self-improvement and to promote moral, social and intellectual growth, by providing lectures, discussions and lending libraries to a rising middle class. At the time there were no free public libraries and books were expensive, so that access to books by borrowing as subscribers provided an important service. The first School of Arts committee in Queensland was established in Brisbane in 1849 with the aim of "the advancement of the community in literary, philosophic and scientific subjects". As towns and districts became established, local committees were formed to set up schools of arts, which became one of the principal sources of adult education. The government recognised this by making land available, subsidising books and assisting with building costs.

A new timber School of Arts building in Bundaberg was constructed on the same site in 1880. The library received a considerable boost from the donation of 3 cases of English classics, ordered from London at a cost of £100, by Thomas McIlwraith, later to become Premier of Queensland and a life member of the School of Arts. The Book Committee also purchased a further 1400 volumes for the new building, the foundation of a library of notable quality.

Although the building was larger than the first, this was a decade when the modest timber buildings of the early settlement were being replaced with handsome masonry structures reflecting Bundaberg's prosperity. A larger and more prestigious building was needed for the School of Arts. Fortunately, the reserve had by now become very valuable real estate, being located at the corner of the intersection which held reserves for the post office, municipal chambers and bank. It was also much larger than required and in 1887 the Committee petitioned the Queensland Legislative Assembly to permit them to divide the land and sell part of it to finance a building in keeping with the town's current position and future needs. An Enabling Act was passed to allow this and the surplus land was sold for £3400.

The new building was designed by Anton Hettrich, a local architect who was born and trained in Germany. In 1884 he commenced practice in Bundaberg and immediately won a competition for the design of the Bundaberg Town Hall. After winning the competition for the design of the School of Arts in 1888 he went briefly into partnership with William Champ, a builder, to carry out this and several other large commissions. Hettrich became a long-standing member of the School of Arts Committee and taught drawing and German there. His practice was very successful and only his pupil, Frederic Herbert Faircloth, gained a similar dominance in local architectural work. By 1897 Hettrich had designed more than 300 buildings in the area. He moved away from Bundaberg in 1900 to supervise work on the Gympie Court House for the Department of Works and later moved to Brisbane. The successful tenderer for the work was a Mr Calvert and work commenced on 2 June 1888 with the old building being moved to the rear of the site to allow continuation of services. The Trustees took possession of the completed building on 16 April 1889 for a cost of £3300. It had a library and rooms available for rental on the ground floor, with a committee room to the rear. On the upper level was a large reading room opening out on to the verandah, a natural history museum and chess rooms. G.H. Bennett, President of the School of Arts Committee, expressed their satisfaction in the "elegant and substantial edifice, so suitable in every way for the purpose for which it was designed".

From 1889 the School of Arts offered technical classes in a variety of practical subjects including drawing, shorthand, bookkeeping, typing, dressmaking, millinery, chemistry, dairy work, manual training and carpentry. These were so successful that in 1898 a timber hall designed by Frederick Faircloth was built behind the School of Arts to accommodate them. This had a stage and piano and was hired out when not in use, thus expanding the activities of the institution, and was enlarged soon after it was built. However, in 1908 the Technical Education Act shifted responsibility for provision of such classes to the government, a factor in the demise of Schools of Arts generally.

Membership of the School of Arts was by subscription and membership numbers were never large. Running the institute was largely a voluntary affair and those involved in the work included many prominent local people, a number of whom were mayors. A gallery was added to the library in the early 1900s, although membership dropped with competition from other activities. However, membership rose again in the 1920s necessitating an extension of the library and this may have been why the western verandah was enclosed at this time. Even during the Depression when the cessation of government subsidies to Schools of Arts spelt the end for many, the Bundaberg institution continued to do well.

In 1928 the construction of the AMP building next door blocked light into the rooms on that side and the eastern verandah was removed, that on the west being removed a few years later. Alternatives for education and leisure activities and the Libraries Act of 1943, which provided for free lending libraries, all contributed to the gradual closure of Schools of Arts around the state. Bundaberg's museum collection was broken up after World War II, but the earnings from rentals and the excellent library helped the School of Arts to survive. In 1969, the Bundaberg and District Museum was formed and moved into the hall the following year.

The School of Arts library remained the only lending library in Bundaberg until the 1970s, when the city council conducted a feasibility study with a view to establishing a free public library. The future of the building was uncertain at this time and members of the Bundaberg Historical Society led public support for retention of the building. In 1976 repair work was carried out by the City of Bundaberg with the aid of a National Estate grant. The hall was demolished and the museum moved into the School of Arts building. The land, building and assets were transferred by the Trustees of the School of Arts to the Bundaberg City Council on 1 January 1979. The library was transferred to the former Customs House and Commonwealth Bank in Quay Street in 1981. The Bundaberg Art Society then used the library room and other rooms in the School of Arts as an art gallery and offices. In 1988 the museum moved into a new building and in the late 1990s the art gallery also moved out. The building continues to serve the people of Bundaberg by being available for hire for cultural and community purposes.

== Description ==
The former School of Arts is a substantial 2 storey rendered brick building in classical revival style and is located close the major intersection of the Bundaberg central business district. It is now bracketed by more modern buildings.

The School of Arts is rectangular in plan and has a hipped roof clad in corrugated iron with cast iron cresting. It is concealed from the street by a parapet with Italianate balusters topped by cement urns. The most striking feature of the building is a 2-storey arcaded verandah along the street elevation which returns for 3 bays on each side. The arcades are constructed of rendered brick and consist on both levels of a central arch topped by a small triangular pediment and flanked by large arches. These are formed of pilasters with Corinthian capitals on masonry plinths supporting a semicircular arch with a central key and edge mould. Cast-iron balustrading links the plinths. The panels between arch, cornice and pilaster are decorated with a wreath and ribbon design in render.

Timber verandahs at each side of the building have recently been reconstructed according to their original form, and the walls behind them are of exposed brick. The brick at the rear of the building has been rendered. Double hung sash windows with round-headed fanlights echo the arcade at the front of the building, as do arches across the interior hallways.

The interior of the building is intact and well detailed. The ground floor walls are plastered brick and there is a central hall from which the former library and offices are reached. The main staircase at the rear of the hall is semicircular in plan and has two niches and a window in the stairwell and a turned timber balustrade leading to a first floor landing. This is joined to the former reading room by a short hall which has smaller rooms to the left and right. The partition walls are of narrow tongue and groove vertical boarding and there are timber ceilings and cornices.

The doors have fretted transoms with a lyre and acanthus design, a classical reference appropriate to centre dedicated to education and the arts.

== Heritage listing ==
The former Bundaberg School of Arts was listed on the Queensland Heritage Register on 21 October 1992 having satisfied the following criteria.

The place is important in demonstrating the evolution or pattern of Queensland's history.

The Bundaberg School of Arts is important as part of the network of Schools of Arts which sprang up in any town of consequence in Queensland during the 19th and early 20th centuries and were a measure of prosperity and progress. The scale and style of the building amply demonstrate the wealth and importance of Bundaberg as a sugar city at this period. Schools of Arts were community based and played a valuable role in the dissemination of information and the provision of facilities for lectures, meetings, games of skill and community events. They were an important stage in the development of adult education in Queensland.

The place is important in demonstrating the principal characteristics of a particular class of cultural places.

The building is a good example of a major regional School of Arts which provided a library, reading room, committee room and museum.

The place is important because of its aesthetic significance.

It is a well designed and imposing building, which by its form, scale and location near a major intersection, makes a major contribution to the townscape of Bundaberg.

The place has a strong or special association with a particular community or cultural group for social, cultural or spiritual reasons.

The building has strong associations with the community of Bundaberg, as an educational and cultural facility and as a source of civic pride for well over a century.

The place has a special association with the life or work of a particular person, group or organisation of importance in Queensland's history.

The building is one of the most important works of prolific local architect Anton Hettrich and also has associations with him as a long-standing member of the School of Arts committee and as a teacher of drawing and German at this institution.
