= Bundaberg War Memorial =

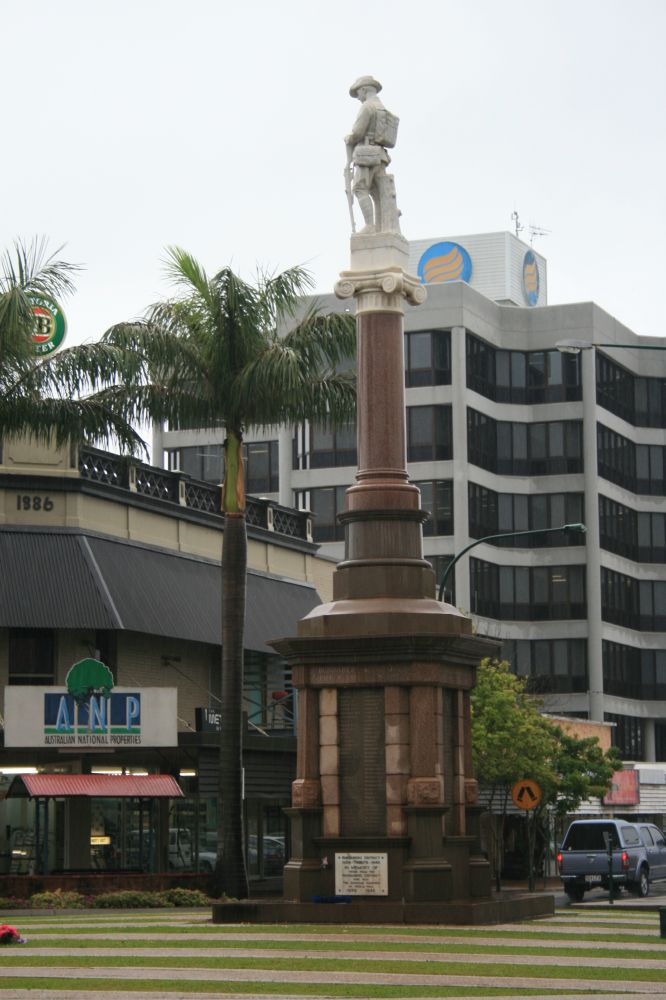
- Bundaberg War Memorial, 2009

- Location within Queensland
- 24.8658°S 152.3499°E
- Location: Bourbong Street, Bundaberg Central, Bundaberg, Bundaberg Region, Queensland, Australia

History
- Design period: 1919–1930s (interwar period)
- Built: 1920–1921

Site notes
- Architect: Frederic Herbert Faircloth
- Architectural style: Classicism

Queensland Heritage Register
- Official name: Bundaberg War Memorial
- Type: state heritage (built)
- Designated: 21 October 1992
- Reference no.: 600364
- Significant period: 1921– (social); 1921 (fabric, historical)
- Significant components: memorial – soldier statue
- Builders: Anselm & Odling (Sydney)

Bundaberg War Memorial is a heritage-listed memorial at Bourbong Street, Bundaberg Central, Bundaberg, Bundaberg Region, Queensland, Australia. It was designed by Frederic Herbert Faircloth and built from 1920 to 1921 by Anselm & Odling (Sydney). It was added to the Queensland Heritage Register on 21 October 1992.

== History ==
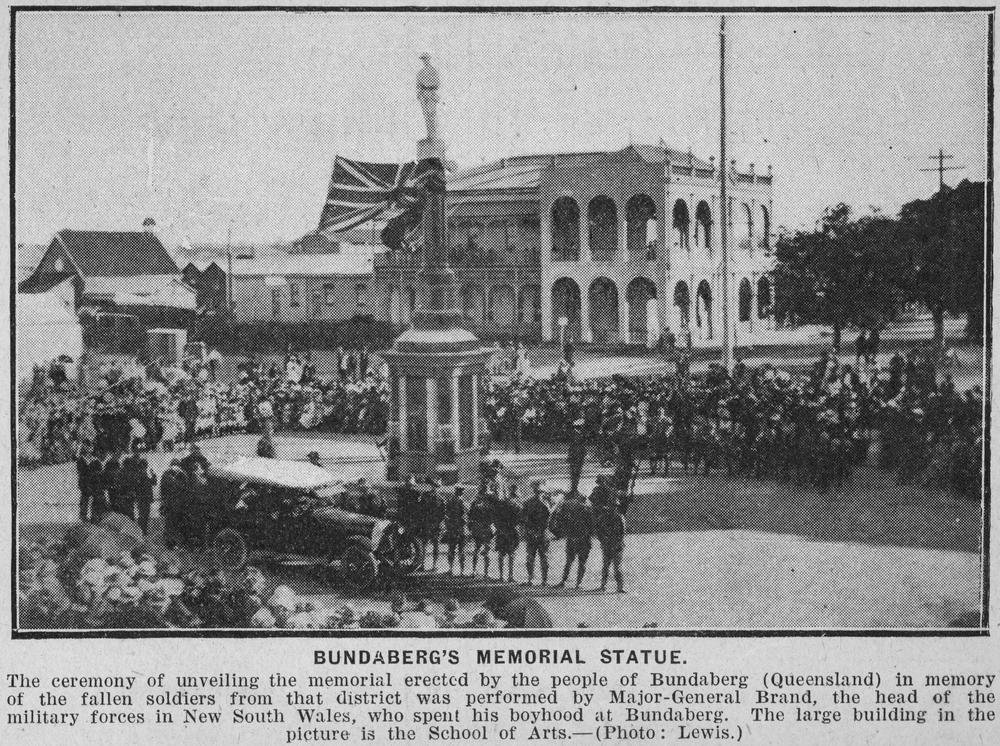
Unveiling of the completed War Memorial Statue, July 1921

The Bundaberg War Memorial was incomplete when it was first unveiled on 31 July 1921, as the statue had not arrived from Italy. On 30 July that year, it was unveiled in its complete form by Major-General Charles Brand. It was designed by Bundaberg architect, F. H. Faircloth and the masonry contractors were Anselm and Odling of Sydney. The granite, trachyte and marble memorial honours one local man who served in the Second Boer War and the 227 local men who served in the First World War.

Bundaberg owes its survival to the growth of the sugar industry in the 1880s. The Millaquin refinery and private milling companies invested in the area and by 1920 the city had become directly and indirectly dependent on the sugar industry.

The impetus for a memorial in Bundaberg originated with the local Soldiers' Reception Committee. On 15 May 1920, the foundation stone was laid by General Sir William Birdwood.

The base and column were created in Sydney, which may explain the use of trachyte, a material more commonly used for memorials in New South Wales than in Queensland.

Australia, and Queensland in particular, had few civic monuments before the First World War. The memorials erected in its wake became our first national monuments, recording the devastating impact of the war on a young nation. Australia lost 60,000 from a population of about 4 million, representing one in five of those who served. No previous or subsequent war has made such an impact on the nation.

Even before the end of the war, memorials became a spontaneous and highly visible expression of national grief. To those who erected them, they were as sacred as grave sites, substitute graves for the Australians whose bodies lay in battlefield cemeteries in Europe and the Middle East. British policy decreed that the Empire war dead were to be buried where they fell. The word "cenotaph", commonly applied to war memorials at the time, literally means "empty tomb".

Australian war memorials are distinctive in that they commemorate not only the dead. Australians were proud that their first great national army, unlike other belligerent armies, was composed entirely of volunteers, men worthy of honour whether or not they made the supreme sacrifice. Many memorials honour all who served from a locality, not just the dead, providing valuable evidence of community involvement in the war. Such evidence is not readily obtainable from military records, or from state or national listings, where names are categorised alphabetically or by military unit.

Australian war memorials are also valuable evidence of imperial and national loyalties, at the time, not seen as conflicting; the skills of local stonemasons, metalworkers and architects; and of popular taste. In Queensland, the soldier statue was the popular choice of memorial, whereas the obelisk predominated in the southern states, possibly a reflection of Queensland's larger working-class population and a lesser involvement of architects.

Many of the First World War monuments have been updated to record local involvement in later conflicts, and some have fallen victim to unsympathetic re-location and repair.

Although there are many different types of memorials in Queensland, the digger statue is the most common. It was the most popular choice of communities responsible for erecting the memorials, embodying the Anzac spirit and representing the qualities of the ideal Australian: loyalty, courage, youth, innocence and masculinity. The digger was a phenomenon peculiar to Queensland, perhaps due to the fact that other states had followed Britain's lead and established Advisory Boards made up of architects and artists, prior to the erection of war memorials. The digger statue was not highly regarded by artists and architects who were involved in the design of relatively few Queensland memorials.

Most statues were constructed by local masonry firms, although some were by artists or imported.

The Bundaberg digger was imported from Italy and is constructed of Italian marble. The completed memorial, at a cost of £1,650, was the third most costly to be erected in Queensland. It is a major regional memorial and one of the two most intact digger memorials that remain in their original settings of intersections. (The other is located in Aramac). It is an unusual example of the work of F H Faircloth.

F. H. Faircloth was born in Maryborough in c. 1870. He was articled to Bundaberg architect Anton Hettrich before establishing his own practice in 1893. In 1894 he became an Associate of the Queensland Institute of Architecture, becoming a Fellow in 1899. Although he lived in Bundaberg for the whole of his professional life, he did not involve himself with the community, preferring to dedicate his life to his architecture. He was responsible for rebuilding much of the Childers Central Business District after the fire of 1902 and also for many substantial buildings in Bundaberg.

The masons, Anselm and Odling were a large firm that had agencies throughout Australia and in London and Italy. It is through these contacts that they were able to import Italian marble digger statues into Australia. They were extensive suppliers of masonry materials and were constantly in pursuit of memorial work.

== Description ==
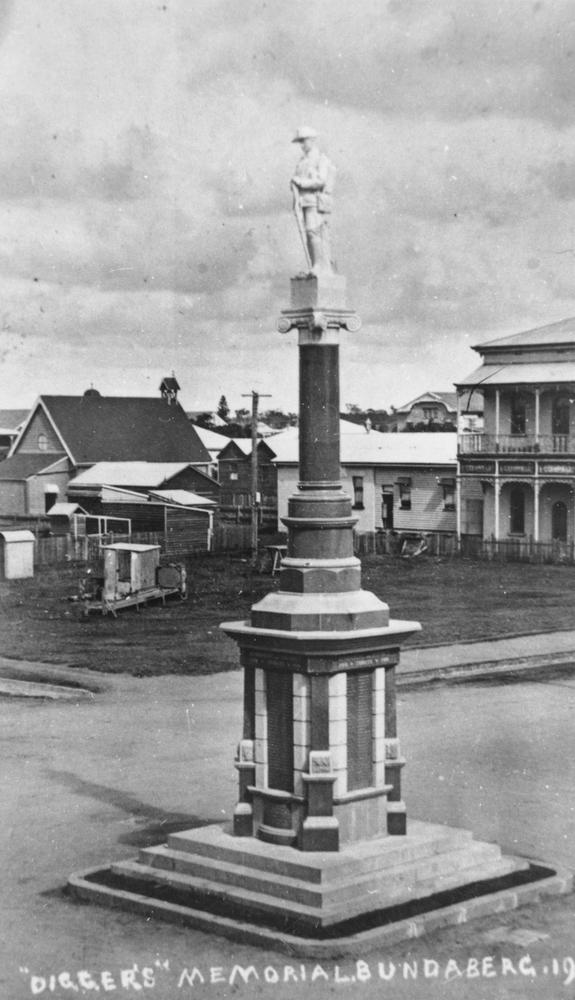
Diggers' Memorial, Bundaberg, 1921

The First World War Memorial is situated at the main intersection of Bundaberg on a traffic island consisting of alternating bands of grass and concrete running parallel to Bourbong Street. The height of the memorial complements the adjacent Post Office tower.

At 38 feet (12 m) high, the memorial is of a massive scale and comprises a pedestal surmounted by a column and a digger statue.

The monument sits on a large trachyte and granite pedestal comprising a central recessed square pillar with engaged square pillars at each corner. The central pillar sits on a simply detailed trachyte base and is flanked by sections of banded stone. The central section of each face bears the cut and gilded names of one local soldier who served in the Boer War and the 277 who served in the First World Wars. Commemorative plates to later conflicts have been added to the pedestal.

The corner pillars sit on trachyte bases and have small cornices surmounted by rusticated stone blocks from which red granite pillars rise. The whole of the pedestal is surmounted by a large frieze and cornice.

Above the cornice sits an octagonal two stepped base of trachyte surmounted by a circular step. This forms a base for a red granite column with a marble Ionic order capital.

Surmounting the column is a marble digger statue, which is life-sized. The soldier stands with his head bowed and his hands are resting on a rifle which is reversed. He carries a backpack and his right leg is bent to create a relaxed stance.

== Heritage listing ==
The Bundaberg War Memorial was listed on the Queensland Heritage Register on 21 October 1992 having satisfied the following criteria.

The place is important in demonstrating the evolution or pattern of Queensland's history.

War memorials are important in demonstrating the pattern of Queensland's history as they are representative of a recurrent theme that involved most communities throughout the state. They provide evidence of an era of widespread Australian patriotism and nationalism, particularly during and following the First World War. The monuments manifest a unique documentary record and are demonstrative of popular taste in the inter-war period.

The place demonstrates rare, uncommon or endangered aspects of Queensland's cultural heritage.

The major regional memorial is an uncommon example of one that is still situated in an original and intact setting and records local participation in the South African Boer War as well as the First World War.

The place is important in demonstrating the principal characteristics of a particular class of cultural places.

The monuments manifest a unique documentary record and are demonstrative of popular taste in the inter-war period. Erected in 1921, the memorial at Bundaberg demonstrates the principal characteristics of a commemorative structure erected as an enduring record of a major historical event. This is achieved through the use of appropriate materials and design elements. As a digger statue it is representative of the most popular form of memorial in Queensland

The place is important because of its aesthetic significance.

This particular statue shows uncommon detailing such as the inclusion of a backpack and an unusual choice of materials. It is of aesthetic significance for its high degree of workmanship, materials and design, creating a dominant landmark within the streetscape.

The place has a strong or special association with a particular community or cultural group for social, cultural or spiritual reasons.

It has a strong association with the community as evidence of the impact of a major historic event and also with Bundaberg architect, F H Faircloth.

The place has a special association with the life or work of a particular person, group or organisation of importance in Queensland's history.

It has a strong association with the community as evidence of the impact of a major historic event and also with Bundaberg architect, F H Faircloth.
