= Commercial Bank, Bundaberg =

Commercial Bank of Sydney
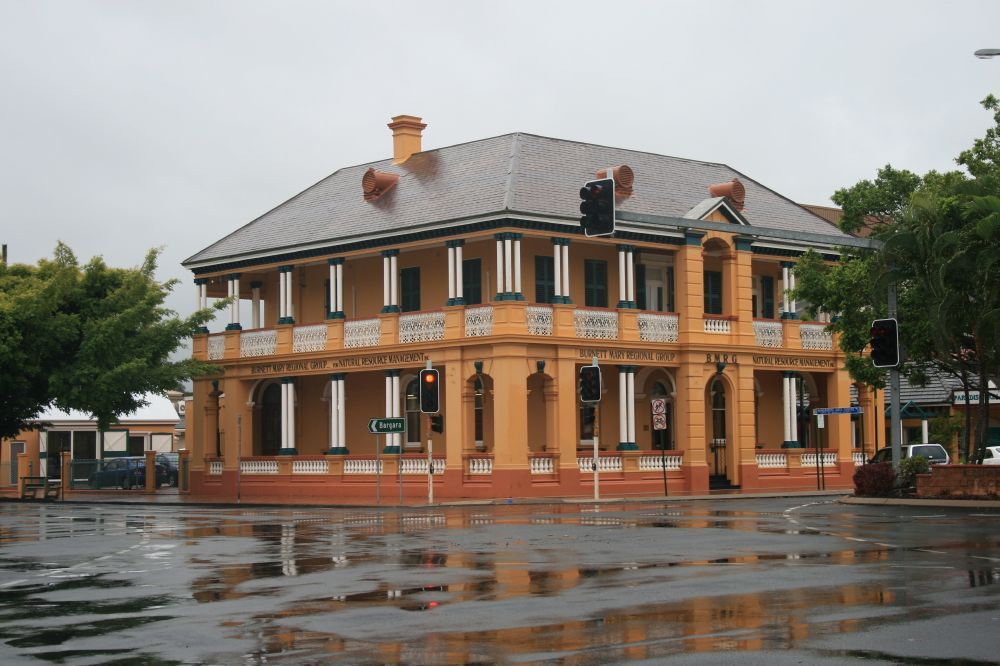
- Former Commercial Bank, 2009

- Location within Queensland Location within Australia
- 24.8663°S 152.3468°E
- Location: 191–193 Bourbong Street, Bundaberg Central, Bundaberg, Bundaberg Region, Queensland, Australia

History
- Design period: 1870s–1890s (late 19th century)
- Built: 1891

Site notes
- Architect: George Allen Mansfield
- Architectural style: Victorian Filigree

Queensland Heritage Register
- Official name: Commercial Bank of Sydney (former), National Australia Bank
- Type: state heritage (built)
- Designated: 21 October 1992
- Reference no.: 600363
- Significant period: 1890s (fabric); 1891–1996 (historical use)
- Significant components: gate – entrance, stables, courtyard, banking chamber, residential accommodation – manager's house/quarters

Commercial Bank of Sydney is a heritage-listed former bank building at 191–193 Bourbong Street, Bundaberg Central, Bundaberg, Bundaberg Region, Queensland, Australia. It was designed by George Allen Mansfield and built in 1891. It is also known as the National Australia Bank. It was added to the Queensland Heritage Register on 21 October 1992.

== History ==
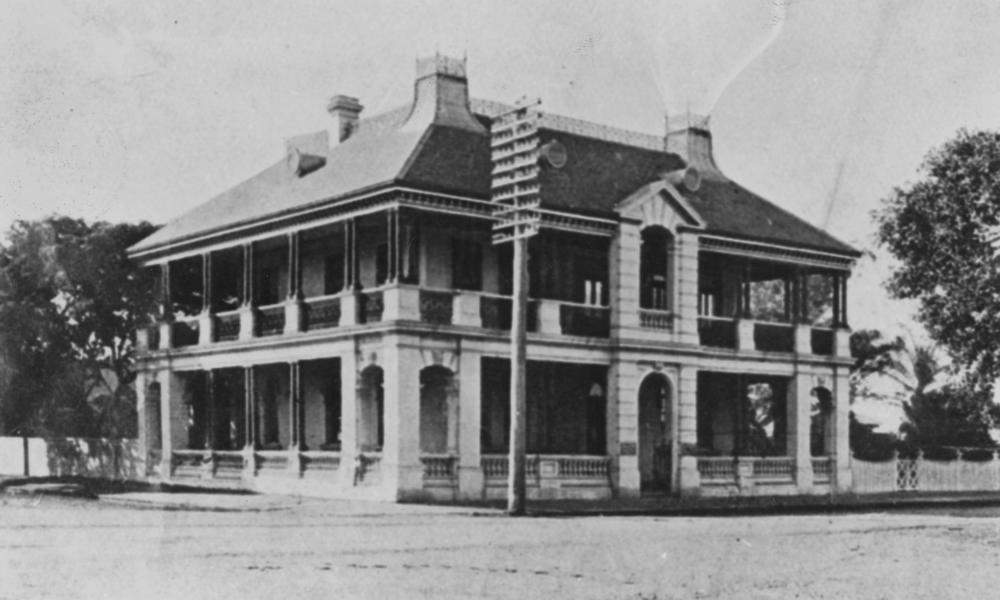
Commercial Banking Company of Sydney, Bundaberg, circa 1910

This large, two-storeyed brick premises and detached stables building, designed by Sydney architect George Allen Mansfield, were purpose-built for the Commercial Banking Company of Sydney Ltd in 1891 as their Bundaberg branch office and manager's residence. They were constructed at the tail end of a period of strong economic prosperity throughout regional Queensland, and at a period when Bundaberg in particular was booming as a sugar town. Although pastoralists had occupied the Bundaberg district from the early 1840s, the town of Bundaberg was not established until the late 1860s. Early forays by Darling Downs squatter Henry Stuart Russell (1842), and by government surveyor James Charles Burnett, who in 1847 surveyed the Burnett River (later named after him), initiated the first wave of non-indigenous settlement in the lower Burnett. Sustained frontier conflict characterised the period from the 1840s to the 1860s, as pastoralists establishing sheep runs (and cattle from the 1860s) clashed with indigenous people intent on resisting the white settlement.

In 1847 Burnett reported unfavourably on the navigability of the Burnett River, and during the early pastoral period Maryborough functioned as the principal port for the Burnett district. However, with timber getters moving into the Burnett from 1866, coastal shipping was soon attracted to the Burnett River. In addition, 1860s government encouragement to closer settlement, through new land and immigration acts and the Sugar and Coffee Regulations of 1864, enticed selectors to take up agricultural land along the Burnett River flats, which were found suitable for the cultivation of sugarcane, maize and coffee, in the second half of the 1860s. In 1869, the town of Bundaberg on the Burnett River was surveyed, to serve the newly emerging agricultural district dependent on the coastal shipping trade.

Prior to 1872 there were no banking facilities in Bundaberg. A Customs House was established on the Burnett River but duties had to be paid in Maryborough. In April 1872 a representative from the Commercial Banking Company of Sydney Ltd (CBC) arrived in Bundaberg to assess whether the town could support a bank, and left town promising that a branch would be established within the next few months. However, the day after his departure, a representative of the Bank of New South Wales (BNSW) rode into Bundaberg from Maryborough with the news that a branch of the BNSW was to open for the transaction of business. The Commercial Banking Company of Sydney opened as promised in June 1872, but the BNSW had already secured most of the banking business in the town, and the CBC was forced to close its Bundaberg branch in October 1873.

In the boom years of the 1880s Bundaberg developed as an important sugar town, with growth sustained into the 1920s following the establishment of private sugar mills and a refinery. By 1883 a branch of the CBC had been re-established in Bundaberg, possibly in rented premises in Barolin Street. Although the CBC had purchased from the Crown two 32 perches (810 m^{2}) allotments at the corner of Bourbong and Maryborough Streets in June 1882 (the land was only proclaimed as available for purchase on 21 April 1882), the Bank did not build on this site until the end of the decade.

By the 1880s, Bourbong Street had been consolidated as the principal commercial street in Bundaberg, and a number of bank buildings were erected here during the sugar boom. These included fine new premises for the Queensland National Bank, completed in 1887.

The CBC commissioned Sydney architect George Allen Mansfield to design their Bundaberg premises. Mansfield designed at least five bank buildings for Queensland – premises for the Bank of New South Wales at Ipswich (1861–62), Brisbane (1864–65), and Bowen (1865–66), and premises for the Commercial Banking Company of Sydney at Rockhampton (1885–86) and Bundaberg (1891).

The Commercial Banking Company of Sydney Ltd's building at the corner of Bourbong and Maryborough Streets, Bundaberg, functioned as banking premises for over a century. In 1973, the CBC sold part of the block to the west, fronting Bourbong Street, but retained the remainder of the site. In 1981–83 the CBC merged with the National Bank of Australasia to form the National Australia Bank Ltd. The former CBC bank at Bundaberg remained a branch of the NAB until closed in 1996 and sold to private interests later that year.

== Description ==
The former Commercial Bank of Sydney is situated on the corner of Bourbong and Maryborough Streets, Bundaberg. It is a substantial, two-storeyed, rendered brick building in boom-era "Italianate" style, built to the street alignments of the block, and has a square plan form and wide surrounding verandahs to both levels. The verandahs on the rear (north) side have been enclosed.

The building has a hipped slate roof with a centre well. Chimneys extend from the roof on the south and north west sides. Dominant cylindrical metal vents project from the roof with two on the front (south) elevation and one on each of the other elevations. Four shaped turrets with cast iron lace rails have been removed from the intersections of the ridges. Cast iron lace ridge capping has also been removed.

The first floor verandahs are supported by paired cast iron columns with corinthian capitals; these are in turn supported by masonry plinths. Between these are cast iron balustrades with timber hand rails. These columns support a dentiled soffit. Similarly paired cast iron columns support the first floor balcony and the ground level balustrade has moulded concrete balustrading with hourglass-shaped balusters. The corners of the ground floor verandah are visually strengthened by construction in masonry with recessed arcading. The ground floor verandah is paved in polychromatic geometric tiles.

A double-storeyed wing with an attached single-storeyed section with hipped slate roofs extends from the rear of the building. Attached to this is a single-storeyed lean-to.

The main entrance off Bourbong Street is accentuated by a masonry pediment sitting on plastered brick piers that rise above the gutter line of the roof. At ground level the entrance is in the form of a portico beneath the verandah which has recessed semi-circular openings and a wrought iron entrance gate.

Paired double-hung sashes with semi-circular heads and hood moulds with supporting decorated stops are located each side of the main entrance door. A secondary entrance is located on the east side with single double-hung windows and French doors. There are single double-hung windows on the west side. At first floor level shuttered French doors open onto the verandahs from each room. Entry into the banking chamber is via a set of heavy timber doors with semi-circular hopper window that features a pair of peacocks in etched glass. To the left of the entry is the banking chamber and to the right two offices and the east side entrance hallway. Three rooms extend north from the north west corner behind these offices. A secondary stair rises to the first floor in this area. None of the original banking chamber fittings exist although the space has remained intact and the original coffered lath and plaster ceilings exist although they are damaged. Cast iron columns at the rear of the banking chamber support an upper storey wall, and beyond this is a room running off the banking chamber to the north. Original timber architraves and skirting survive in the principal offices.

Access to the first floor is via a timber return stair with turned balusters. The stairwell windows and entry door have leadlight glazing with a central diamond pattern with bird designs. A green marble fireplace with cast iron grate and ceramic tiled reveal is in the office adjacent to the side hallway and main stair.

The upper floor, which was formally the manager's residence, retains its original configuration of six rooms surrounding a central hall running off the main stair landing. Each room opens out onto the surrounding verandahs via French doors with timber shutters on the outside. Three original marble fireplaces exist at the first floor level.

The northern verandah, which has been enclosed, is supported on cast iron columns and connects to toilets and a secondary stair.

To the north of the main building is a detached, single-storeyed, gabled roof brick stables building. Its Maryborough Street elevation retains an early hoist and doors to the hayloft in the roof space, and the whole appears to be substantially intact.

The bitumenised courtyard between the main building and the stables building is enclosed along Maryborough Street by a timber paling fence with capping rail. There are double gates in this fence which allow vehicle access to the site. To the east of the main building, fronting Bourbong Street, there is a low masonry fence with a small pedestrian gateway enclosing parking space accessed from the side street. The rear of the site, fronting Post Office Lane, is enclosed with a modern wire fence.

== Heritage listing ==
The former Commercial Bank of Sydney building in Bundaberg was listed on the Queensland Heritage Register on 21 October 1992 having satisfied the following criteria.

The place is important in demonstrating the evolution or pattern of Queensland's history.

The former Commercial Bank of Sydney at Bundaberg, completed in 1891, is important in demonstrating the development of early competitive banking facilities in rural Queensland; in illustrating an economic boom period in Queensland's history; and in illustrating the evolution of Bundaberg as a regional centre.

The place demonstrates rare, uncommon or endangered aspects of Queensland's cultural heritage.

The main building, together with an early and rare surviving detached brick stables building, is important in illustrating a way of life no longer practiced.

The place is important in demonstrating the principal characteristics of a particular class of cultural places.

It is architecturally significant as a surviving, substantially intact example of 1880s boom-era architecture. It is important in demonstrating the principal characteristics of its type: a substantial two-storeyed brick building which combined banking chamber and offices and bank manager's residence; which is designed to accommodate the warm Queensland climate, as illustrated by the wide surrounding verandahs to both levels and numerous windows and French doors; and which is designed to impress.

The place is important because of its aesthetic significance.

The place has aesthetic value, derived from its strong streetscape presence, form, materials, and the craftsmanship of the joinery, stained glass and overall construction.

The place has a special association with the life or work of a particular person, group or organisation of importance in Queensland's history.

It is important for its association with the expansion of the Commercial Banking Company of Sydney Ltd in the late 19th century and the role the Bank played in the development of regional Queensland at this period. It is also illustrative of the Queensland commercial work of Sydney architect George Allen Mansfield, who designed at least five bank buildings erected in Queensland in the period 1861–1891.
