= Australian Labor Party National Conference =

Highest representative and decision-making body

ALP National Conference
- Status: Active
- Genre: Party conference
- Frequency: Triennial (Note: Conferences are scheduled to be held once per federal parliamentary term, which is a maximum of 3 years per the Constitution of Australia)
- Locations: Australian Capital cities on a rotating basis (Note: The 1971, 1973 and 1975 conferences were held in the cities of Launceston, Gold Coast and Terrigal respectively. The 2021 special conference was held virtually due to the COVID-19 pandemic.)
- Country: Australia
- Years active: 126
- Inaugurated: 27 January 1900
- Most recent: 23 July 2026
- Previous event: 2026 Australian Labor Party National Conference
- Next event: 2029 Australian Labor Party National Conference
- Participants: Australian Labor Party (Note: Includes members of affiliated trade unions who are concurrently members of the party)
- Attendance: 2,000+
- Organiser: National Executive
- Website: laborconference.org.au

The Australian Labor Party National Conference, sometimes referred to as the Commonwealth Conference or the Federal Conference, is the highest representative and decision-making body of the Australian Labor Party, incorporating all of the party's state and territory branches. The National Conference takes place triennially and is hosted in Australian cities on a rotating basis. The 50th and most recent National Party Conference is being held in Adelaide at the Adelaide Convention Centre from Thursday 23 July until Saturday 25 July and was attended by over 2,000 party members.

The 49th National Party Conference was held on 17–19 August 2023 at the Brisbane Convention & Exhibition Centre and was attended by over 2,000 party members along with 399 elected delegates. The 48th conference held in Adelaide in 2018, was attended by 397 party delegates, and the pivotal 2011 National Conference held on 3 December 2011. The conference following the 48th in 2018 was intended to take place in March 2021. However, this was cancelled due to COVID-19 precautions, thus the 49th National conference was not held until August 2023.

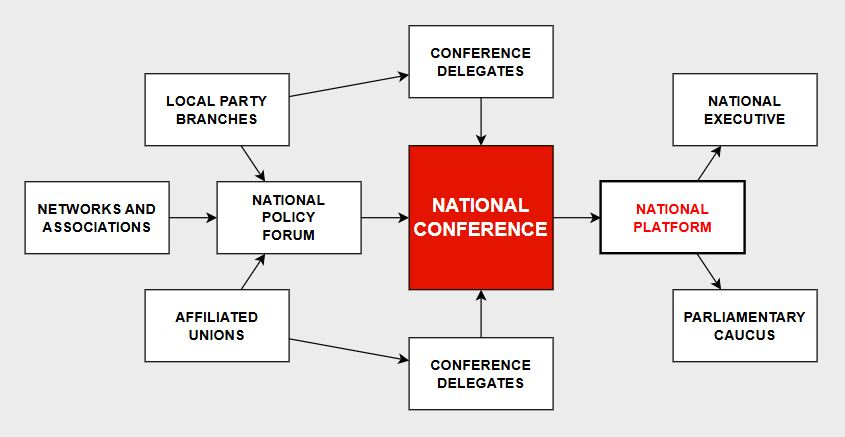
The national policy creation process for the Australian Labor Party

The National Conference approves a statement of party policy, called the National Platform. This document is drafted in the lead-up to the National Conference by the ALP's National Policy Forum, co-chaired by the parliamentary leader and the national president. In practice, however, Labor policy is ultimately determined by the leader of the Parliamentary Labor Party and the Australian Labor Party Caucus.

Decisions of the Conference are implemented by the National Executive. Twenty members of the National Executive are elected by the National Conference. The National Conference does not elect the party's parliamentary leaders, which since 2013 has been by a ballot of both the Parliamentary Caucus and by the Labor Party's rank-and-file members. The national president and vice-presidents are elected by a vote of party members. On many matters votes at the Conference take place on a factional basis. In the past, the Labor Right faction held a majority at the National Conference, though it lost the majority at the 2015 National Conference.

== Delegates ==
Australian Labor Party Conference Delegates
- New South Wales: 105 / 397
- Victoria: 89 / 397
- Queensland: 73 / 397
- Western Australia: 45 / 397
- South Australia: 33 / 397
- Tasmania: 23 / 397
- Australian Capital Territory: 9 / 397
- Northern Territory: 7 / 397
- Federal Parliamentary Caucus: 6 / 397
- Parliamentary Leadership: 4 / 397
- Young Labor: 3 / 397

The Australian Labor Party National Constitution outlines the process for the nomination and election of conference delegates, including ex-officio non-voting delegates. The national constitution is re-approved at each conference, and amendments to the constitution can be proposed as individual motions. A simple majority of voting delegates is required to pass motions amending the national platform and national constitution.

=== Size of delegations ===
The current national constitution, adopted in 2023 by the 49th National Conference, outlines the following process for determining the total number of delegates:

15 (a) National Conference shall consist of the following delegates:
(i) four delegates being the Leader and Deputy Leader of the FPLP and the Leader and Deputy Leader of the Party in the Senate
(ii) six delegates elected from and by the FPLP;
(iii) delegations from each state consisting of:
(A) the state Parliamentary Leader,
(B) a base component of 12 persons, and
(C) a supplementary component of a number of persons equal to twice the number of House of Representatives electorates in that state as at the previous 31 December;
(iv) delegations from each territory consisting of:
(A) the territory Parliamentary Leader,
(B) a base component of 2 persons, and
(C) a supplementary component of a number of persons equal to twice the number of House of Representatives electorates in that territory as at the previous 31 December; and
(v) three delegates from Australian Young Labor.

ALP Conference Delegate Allocations
New South Wales	Victoria	Queensland	Western Australia	South Australia	Tasmania	Australian Capital Territory	Northern Territory	Federal Caucus	Party Leadership	Young Labor
105	89	73	45	33	23	9	7	6	4	3

== Notable actions and policy positions ==
=== Conscription ===
External videos
- 2021 Special Platform Conference
- Conference Live Stream – Day 1
- Conference Live Stream – Day 2

=== Socialist objective and nationalisation ===
The very first detailed and published Australian Labor Party National Platform was developed at the 2nd Commonwealth Conference in 1902. The platform held "Nationalisation of Monopolies" to be one of the party's top federal priorities, along with establishing a "commonwealth bank of deposit." Both policy priorities were signs of the strong democratic socialist values of the early Labor Party. The 1902 platform also called for the nationalisation of railways in Australia.

By 1921, the party's platform had become significantly more socialist, now including the primary objective of "the socialisation of industry, production, distribution and exchange" with the following implementation methods:

"(a) The constitutional utilisation of industrial and Parliamentary machinery;
(b) The organisation of workers along the lines of industry;
(C) Nationalisation of banking and all principal industries;
(d) The municipalisation of such services as can best be operated in limited areas;
(e) Government of nationalised industries by boards, upon which the workers in the industries and the community shall have representation
(f) The establishment of an elective Supreme Economic Council by all nationalised industries;
(g) The setting up of Labor research and Labor information bureaux and of Labor educational institutions in which the workers shall be trained in the management of the nationalised industries."

— Australian Labor Party, Platform and Constitution (As adopted by the 9th Commonwealth Conference), 1921

The emergence of the Cold War and a subsequent nationwide fear of communism in Australia led to the party platform's objective being amended from "The Socialisation of Industry, Production, Distribution and Exchange" in 1948 to "the Socialisation of Industry, Production, Distribution and Exchange – to the extent necessary to eliminate exploitation and other anti-social features in those fields" and 2 years later to "the Democratic Socialisation of Industry, Production, Distribution and Exchange—to the extent necessary to eliminate exploitation and other anti-social features in those fields." The same objective would remain unchanged until an amendment at the 1981 conference added "the Australian Labor Party is a democratic socialist party.".

Only once has a federal Labor government attempted to nationalise any industry (Ben Chifley's bank nationalisation of 1947), and that was held by the High Court to be unconstitutional. The Hawke and Keating governments of 1983–1996 had seen a dramatic shift in how the party handled the issues of nationalisation and privatisation, the most notable example being the privatisation of Qantas and The Commonwealth Bank following significant debate at the 1990 Special Conference.

From the 1998 platform onwards, primary party objectives speaking to socialisation or nationalisation of industries had been removed entirely and instead moved to the party's constitution.

The socialist objective was reviewed in 2015; however it still remains a part of the party's current constitution (adopted in 2023) subject to numerous modifications and clarifications present in a subsequent paragraph introduced in the 1980s.

National Platform Objective
Year	Objective	Ref
1948	The Socialisation of industry, Production, Distribution end Exchange	
1955	The Socialisation of Industry, Production, Distribution and Exchange – to the extent necessary to eliminate exploitation and other anti-social features in those fields—in accordance with the Principles of Action, Methods and Progressive Reforms set out in this Platform.	
1957	The Democratic Socialisation of Industry, Production, Distribution and Exchange – to the extent necessary to eliminate exploitation and other anti-social features in those fields—in accordance with the Principles of Action, Methods and Progressive Reforms set out in this Platform.	
1981	The Australian Labor Party is a democratic socialist party and has the objective of the democratic socialisation of industry, production, distribution and exchange, to the extent necessary to eliminate exploitation and other anti-social features in these fields.	
1998	Providing security, creating opportunity, managing change	

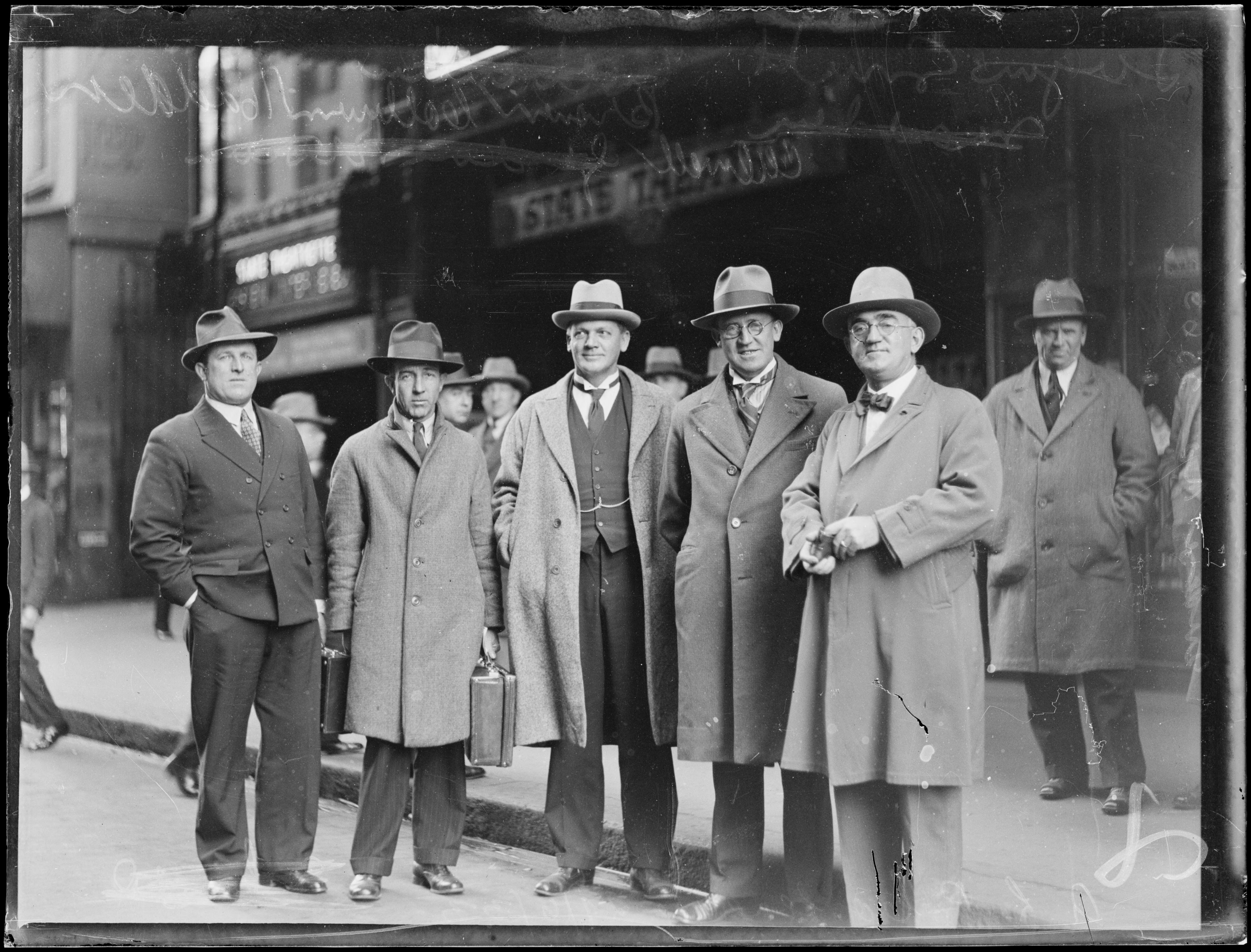
1933 ALP Federal Conference delegates John Madden, Bill Colbourne, Gordon Brown, Arthur Calwell and William Forgan Smith

=== Expulsion of the New South Wales branch ===
In March 1931, a Special Federal Conference was called in response to the actions of the New South Wales state executive, which was controlled by the Lang Labor faction. The New South Wales state leader, Jack Lang, had been openly defying the federal Labor government for several months. The most immediate trigger was the state party's actions at the East Sydney by-election, where it announced that its candidate, Eddie Ward, would be bound only by the decisions of the state executive, not the federal caucus. At the conference, which the New South Wales Branch boycotted, John Curtin successfully moved for the branch's expulsion; the motion was carried by 25 votes to four.

The conference also gave the Federal Executive the power to suspend or dissolve any other state branch "acting or having acted in a manner deemed [...] contrary to the Federal Constitution, Platform, and Policy of the Party". The conference subsequently moved for the establishment of a new ALP branch in New South Wales loyal to the Federal Executive, which became known as the "Federal Labor Party". As the Federal Executive had no power to dissolve the original branch (controlled by Lang), the two parties competed against each other at elections for several years. The rebellious branch was eventually re-admitted to the party at another Special Federal Conference in Melbourne in 1936.

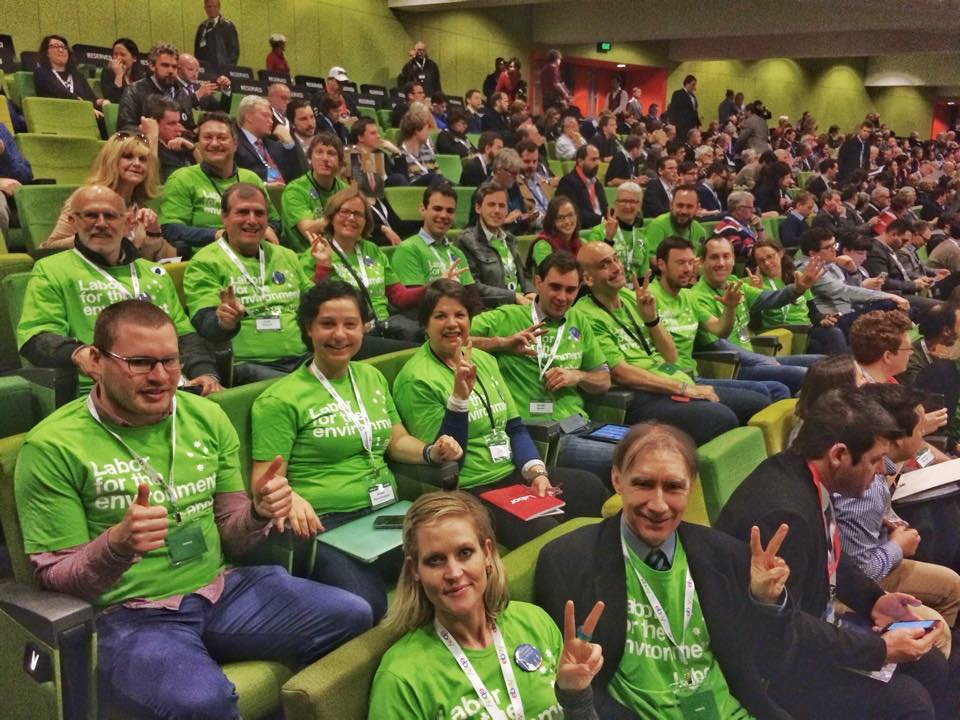
Members of the Labor Environment Action Network at the 49th National Conference, Brisbane, 17 August 2023

=== White Australia Policy ===
The first meeting of the Federal Labor Party in January 1900 (referred to as the Political Labour League) had included a policy of "total exclusion of coloured and other undesirable races." This policy was formalised once again at the subsequent Australian Labor Party Commonwealth Conference in 1902, with "Maintenance of a White Australia" being the first item on the party's platform.

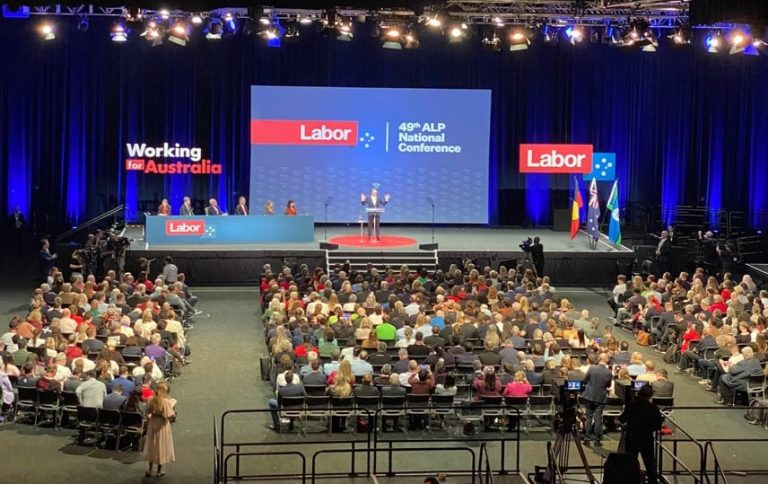
Prime Minister Anthony Albanese addressing the 49th Australian Labor Party National Conference, Brisbane, 17 August 2023

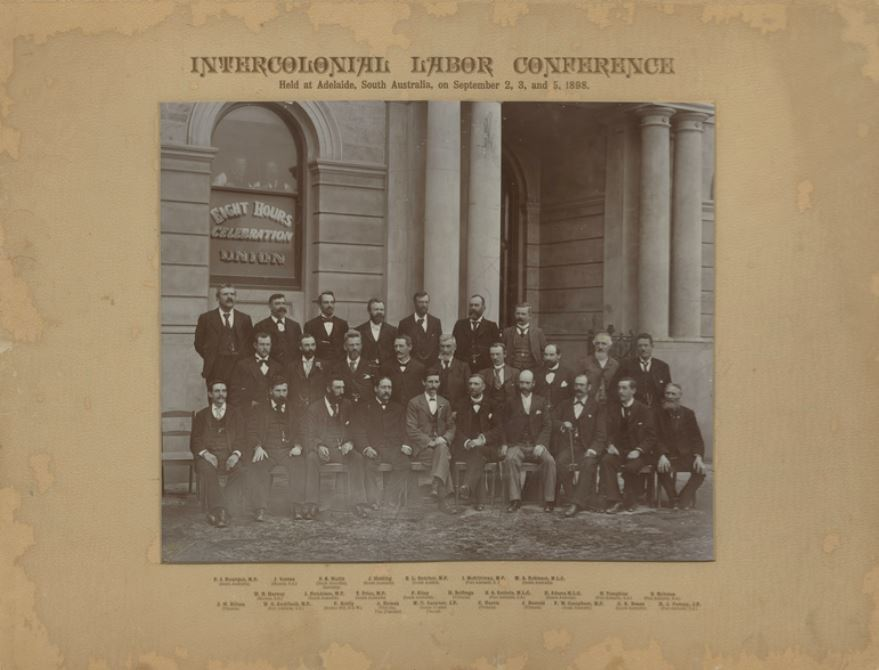
Intercolonial Labour Conference, Adelaide, 1898

By 1921, the policy had developed into "The cultivation of an Australian sentiment, the maintenance of White Australia, and the development in Australia of an enlightened and self reliant community." The 1959 platform included the following explanation for the party's continued support for racially-motivated immigration restrictions:

"The maintenance of the White Australia policy by the encouragement of the entry of suitable immigrants which shall be strictly regulated so as not to impose any undue strain on the Australian economy or to imperil full employment or Australian industrial conditions through over-competition for available work. Immigration policy should be directed to creating further employment for Australians and opportunities for newcomers by the breaking up of large estates, the expansion of primary and secondary industries, and the promotion of national works."

— Australian Labor Party, Federal Platform and Objective (As adopted by the 23rd Commonwealth Conference), 1959

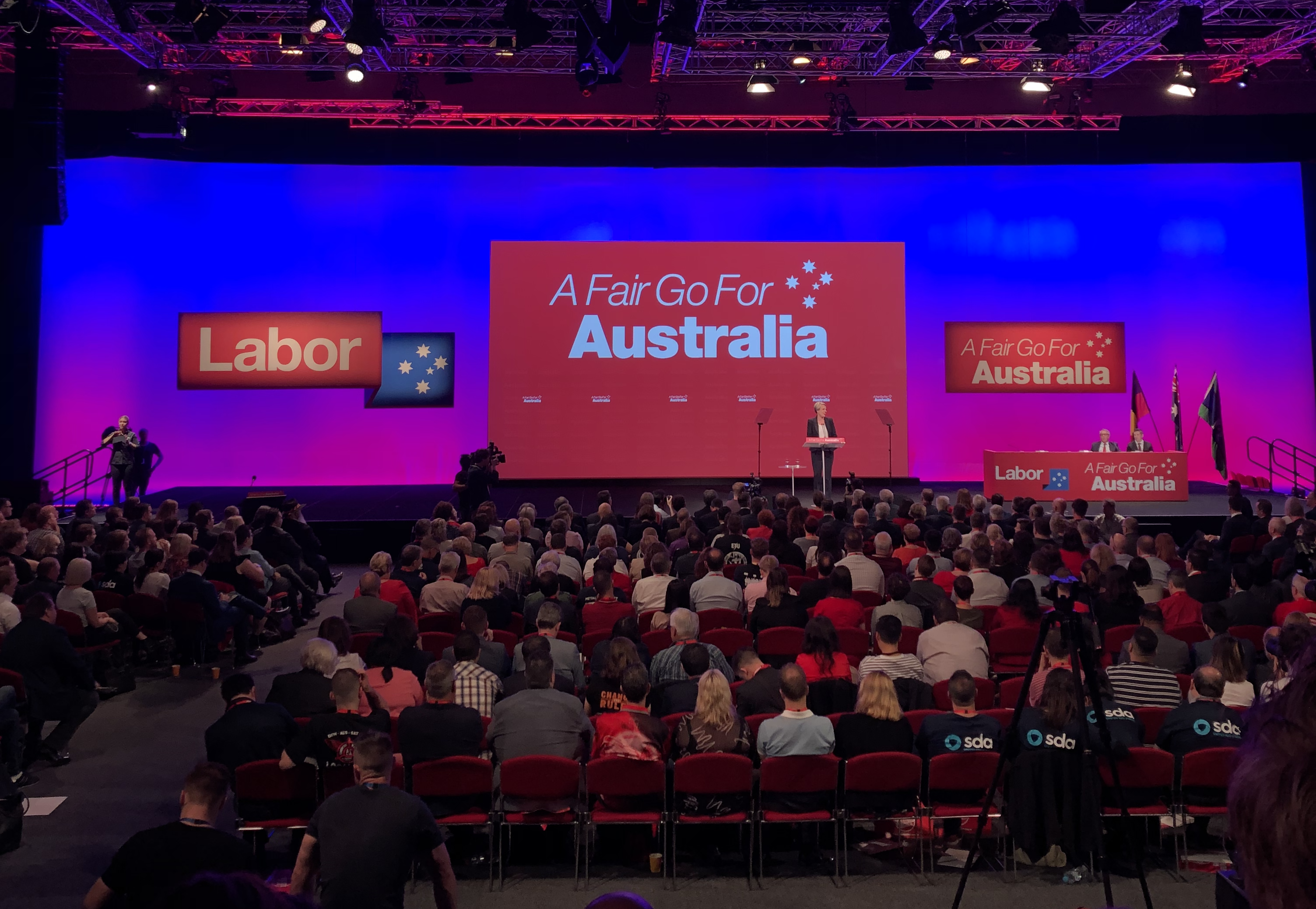
Tanya Plibersek addressing the 48th Australian Labor Party National Conference in Adelaide, 17 December 2018

However, by the very next conference in 1961, the following section had been added:

"Labor welcomes to Australia the people of the countries concerned and will, in friendship, assist to its utmost their assimilation into the Australian nation. Maintenance of a White Australia shall provide the basis for immigration policy. This basis does not represent a racial prejudice or carry any suggestion of racial superiority. The policy rejects the 'Asian quota system" on the grounds that it would make no material impact on overpopulated Asian countries, and would be harsher and more discriminating than the present regulations governing the entry of Asians into Australia for the purposes of trade and education."

— Australian Labor Party, Federal Platform and Objective (As adopted by the 24th Commonwealth Conference), 1961

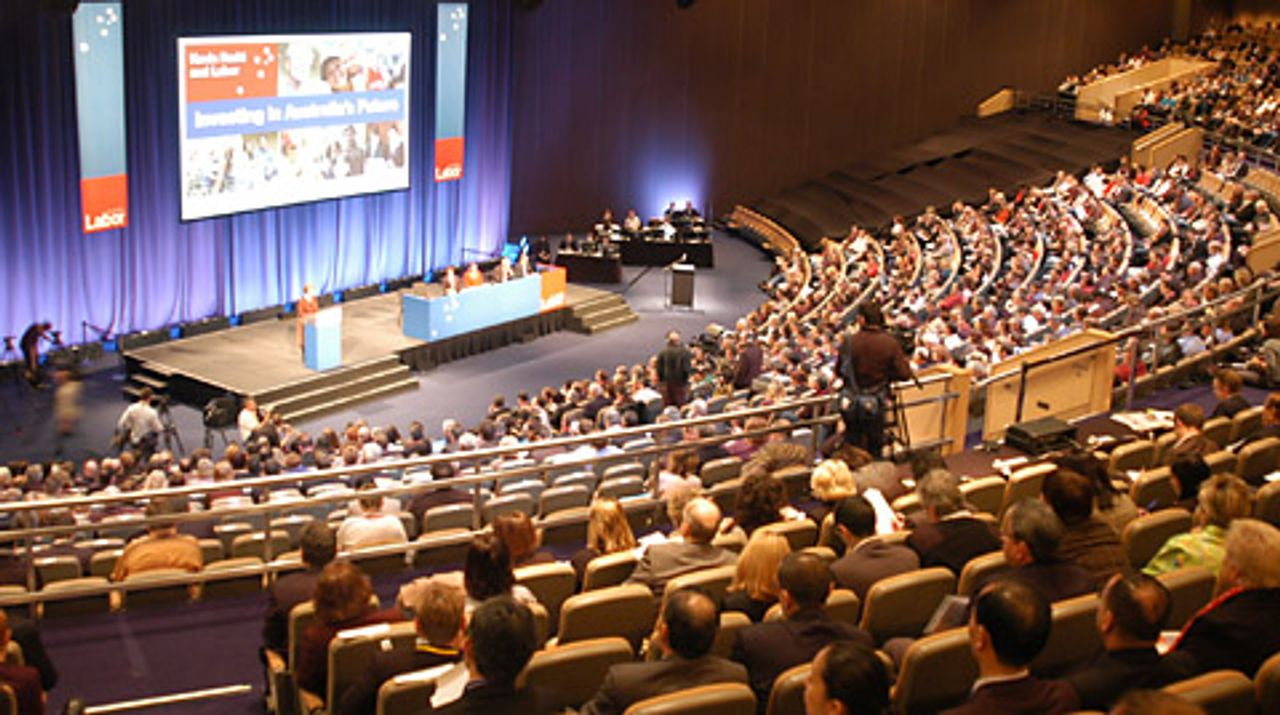
45th Australian Labor Party National Conference in Sydney, 30 July 2009

The 1967 conference saw a major overhaul in a number of policy areas, thanks in no small part to the advocacy of progressive party members Gough Whitlam, Don Dunstan and Lionel Murphy. Any reference to "white Australia" was removed entirely, and the following section inserted:

"Convinced that increased population is vital to the future development of Australia, the Australian Labor Party will support and uphold a vigorous and expanding immigration programme administered with sympathy, understanding and tolerance."

— Australian Labor Party, Federal Platform and Objective (As adopted by the 27th Commonwealth Conference), 1967

The Whitlam government introduced a number of important national reforms in the area of multiculturalism and immigration, including the Racial Discrimination Act 1975, and this progress continued under successive Labor governments. The Hawke government established the Advisory Council for Multicultural Affairs, the Keating government amended the Racial Discrimination Act to allow determinations of the Australian Human Rights Commission (established to monitor violations of the Act) to be registered by the Federal Court of Australia and given judicial force.

The most recent Australian Labor Party National Platform contains the following sections on Multiculturalism in Australia:

"41. The Labor Government will develop a new multicultural framework to advance a multicultural Australia, support our cohesive and inclusive multicultural society and ensure settings are fit for purpose to harness the talents of all Australians.

42. Labor is committed to removing barriers to recent migrants' participation in our economy and society, ensuring that diversity is measured and reflected in social, economic and political participation and that government services reflect the needs of all Australians.

43. Labor is very concerned by the rise of racism and of division, and will continue to oppose those who foster extremism, hatred, ethnic division or incitement to violence. Labor will combat racism with a zero-tolerance approach."

— Australian Labor Party, National Platform (As adopted by the 49th National Conference), 2023

The 2023 platform further states: "Australia is, and will remain, a society of people drawn from a rich variety of cultural, ethnic, linguistic and religious backgrounds. Australia is, and will remain, a multicultural society."

=== Uranium mining ===
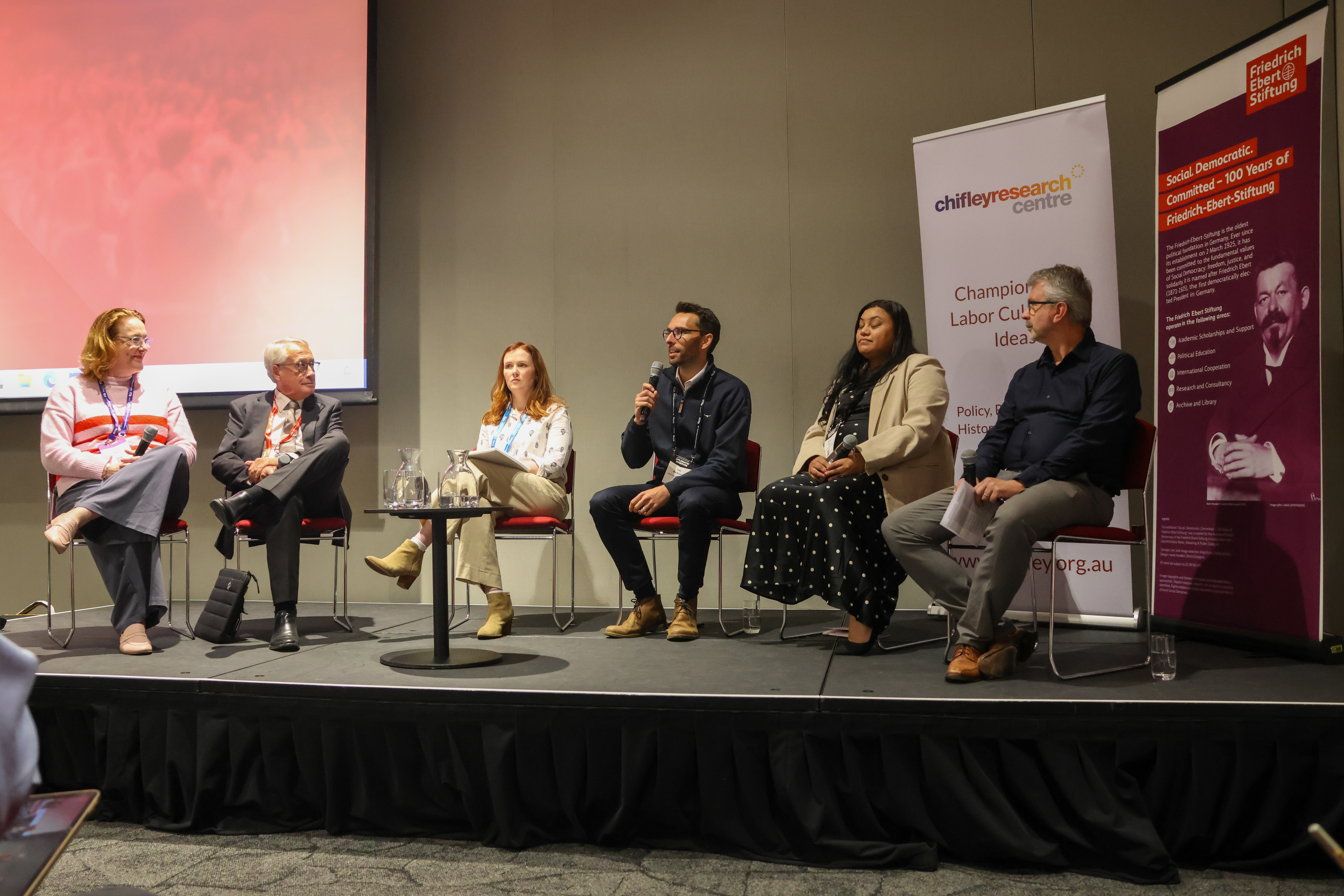
A Chifley Research Centre event at the 2026 Australian Labor Party National Conference in Adelaide

Out of government from 1975 to 1983, the Labor Party was deeply divided over uranium mining, with tensions aggravated by continued French nuclear testing. The 1977 National Conference voted in favour of an indefinite moratorium on uranium mining. However, the 1982 National Conference changed the anti-uranium position in favour of a "one mine policy".

After the ALP won power in 1983, the 1984 National Conference adopted a "three mine policy". This referred to the then three existing uranium mines in Australia, Nabarlek, Ranger and Roxby Downs/Olympic Dam, and articulated ALP support for pre-existing mines and contracts, but opposition to any new mining. The three mine policy was abandoned by the Howard government after it won the 1996 Australian federal election.

At the 2007 national conference, Labor Leader Kevin Rudd supported a successful motion to remove the party's opposition to more than three mines, but adding "stringent restrictions." the platform reinforced restrictions on the export of ore to nations who had not guaranteed the uranium would not be used for nuclear weapons production:

"Labor will allow the export of uranium only to those countries which observe the Nuclear Non-Proliferation Treaty (NPT), are committed to non-proliferation policies, have ratified international and bilateral nuclear safeguards agreements and maintain strict safeguards and security controls over their nuclear power industries."

— Australian Labor Party, Platform and Constitution (As adopted by the 44th Commonwealth Conference), 2007

After returning to government following the 2007 Australian federal election, Labor approved a fourth uranium mine in July 2009, the Four Mile uranium mine in South Australia.

=== Same-sex Marriage ===
The 2011 National Conference voted in favour of recognition of same-sex marriage in Australia, and also formally endorsed a motion to allow Labor members of parliament the ability to vote in accordance with their consciences. Nonetheless, a subsequent bill to recognise same-sex marriage was defeated. Equal marriage was ultimately introduced following by a conscience vote held under the Turnbull Liberal government, following a postal survey.

== Notable conference speeches ==
=== "The perfect illustration of the big lie" ===
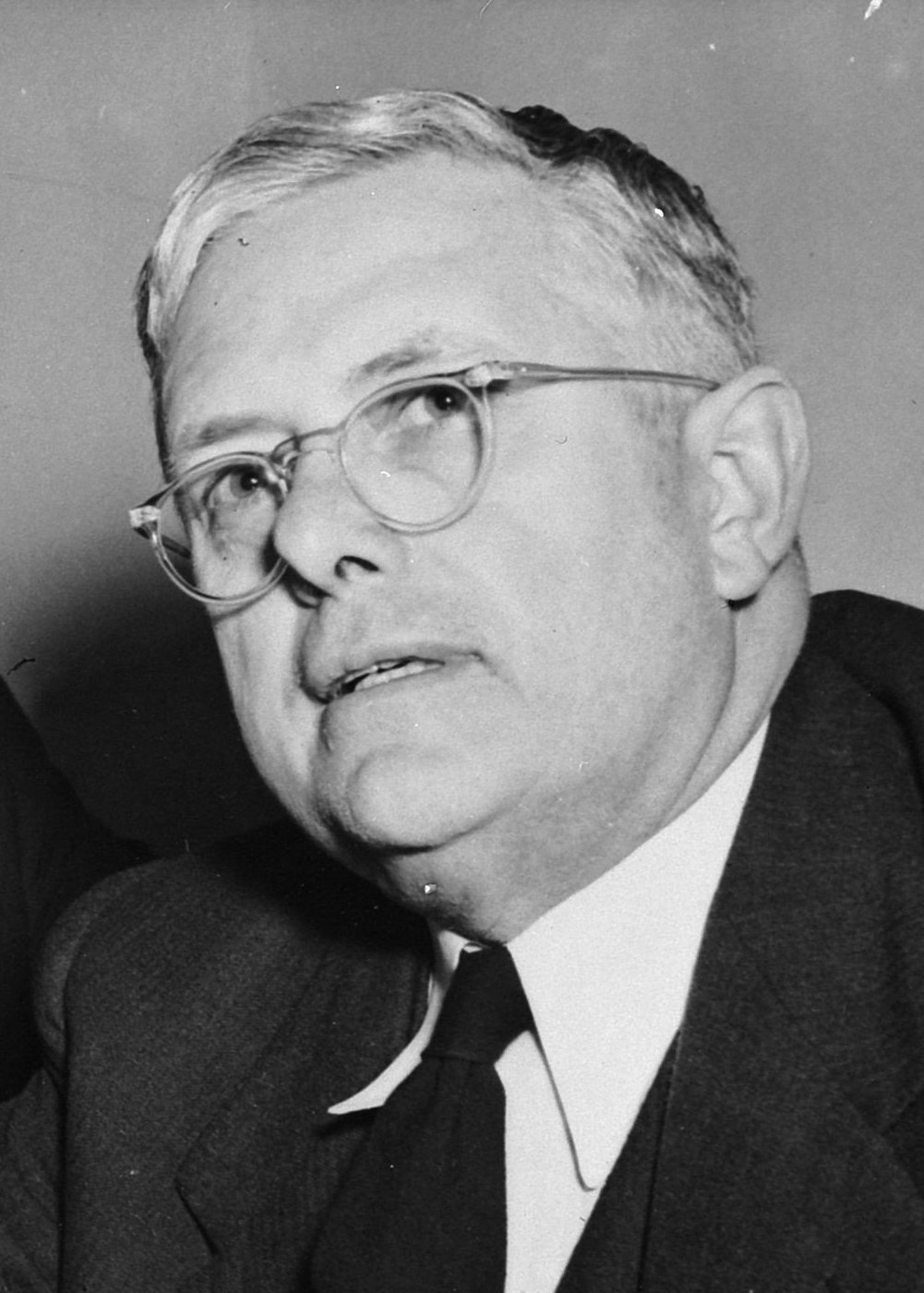
H.V. "Doc" Evatt in 1948

Herbert Vere "Doc" Evatt was elected leader of the Labor Party in 1951 following the unexpected death of former prime minister Ben Chifley. He took over leadership of the party a month after the coalition government led by Robert Menzies secured another term and gained control over both houses of parliament. A significant issue during the 1951 election was the Communist Party Dissolution Act 1950 (which Labor had agreed to support), and the resulting High Court challenge which led to the legislation being declared unconstitutional. Several trade unions had supported the case against the anti-communist legislation, and the communist party was known to have had significant influence over officeholders in many trade unions across the country. The perceived relationship between the labour movement and communism created opportunities for the Menzies government to publicly attack the opposition and contributed significantly to the Australian Labor Party split of 1955.

At the 20th Commonwealth Conference in 1953, Evatt sought to solidify the Labor Party's stance against communist influence within the wider labour movement, and counter the very effective arguments made by the government in the lead up to the 1954 election. This included highlighting distinctions between the Marxist-communist theory of "seizing the means of production" and the longheld Labor Party objective of nationalising and/or dismantling monopolies.

"In previous campaigns there were false assertions that all businesses and industries, farms and homes would be nationalised by the Labor Government. This is the perfect illustration of the big lie. But the lie has been killed by the decision of the Labor Conference of 1951 declaring that the policy of Labor in relation either to socialisation or to social control was that Government intervention by such means would be sought only so far as it was necessary to prevent exploitation of the people or social injustice. That is the dominant principle of Labor's policy. It means that Australians do not believe in Government ownership of projects as an end in itself or as a cure-all. But if a powerful vested interest exploits the people and acts oppressively, Government intervention may become essential to prevent an obvious case of social injustice."

— H. V. Evatt, 20th Australian Labor Party Commonwealth Conference, Adelaide, South Australia, 21 January 1953

=== "On the side of sanity and in the cause of humanity" ===
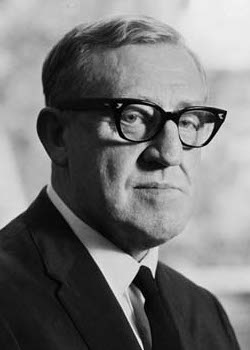
Arthur Calwell in 1966

Arthur Calwell had led the federal Labor Party since 1960, losing two elections before taking to the stage at the party's 1965 Commonwealth Conference to move a motion firmly stating Labor's opposition to the Vietnam War. "I cannot promise you that easy popularity can be bought in times like these; nor are we looking for it," he told delegates. Calwell had opposed Australia's involvement from the start, labelling it in 1965 as a "dirty," "cruel," and "unjust" conflict.

The subsequent 1966 Australian federal election was a significant loss for Calwell and Labor. The Coalition government, led by Harold Holt, had taken advantage of Labor's opposition to the Australian contribution to the war, which was still viewed positively by much of the electorate. The Coalition had adopted the election slogan "Keep Australia secure and prosperous – play it safe," and played heavily on the electorate's fears of a communist-controlled South Vietnam. Despite electoral unpopularity, Labor maintained its opposition to the war, and Calwell strongly denounced a 1967 visit to Australia by South Vietnam leader Nguyen Cao Ky, calling him a "power-hungry opportunist", a "little Quisling gangster", a "miserable little butcher" and a "moral and social leper".

"But if we are to have the courage of our convictions, then we must do our best to make the voice heard. I offer you the probability that you will be traduced, your motives will be misrepresented, your patriotism will be impugned and that your courage will be called into question. But I also offer you the sure and certain knowledge that we will be vindicated; that generations to come will record with gratitude that when a reckless government wilfully endangered the security of this nation, the voice of the Australian Labor Party was heard, strong and clear, on the side of sanity and in the cause of humanity and in the interests of Australia’s security."

— Arthur Calwell, 26th Australian Labor Party National Conference, Sydney, New South Wales, 4 August 1965

=== "Equality of life and more quality in life" ===
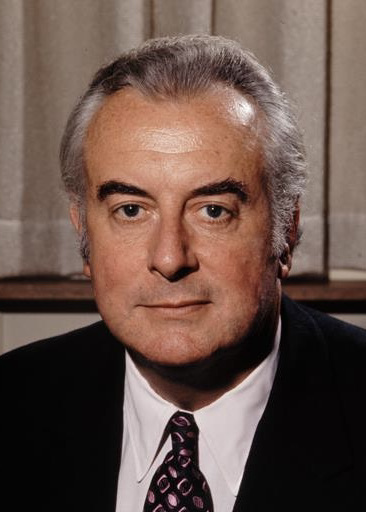
Gough Whitlam led the Australian Labor Party from 1967 to 1977

Gough Whitlam addressed the 1969 Commonwealth Conference in Melbourne, two years after assuming the leadership of the parliamentary party from Arthur Calwell, and just three months before the 1969 Australian federal election. His address focused on outlining the significant suite of reforms the conference had just made, a result of a "new guard" of Labor delegates (including Whitlam, Don Dunstan and Lionel Murphy among others) pushing hard for Labor to become a truly reformist democratic socialist party.

Almost two-thirds of the Labor National Platform had been re-written, the most comprehensive review of their policies in decades. The new platform established the principles for universal healthcare (which would later become Medibank and then Medicare), federal aid for all schools, a national superannuation scheme, automatic annual pension increases, a welfare safety-net and ratification of the Nuclear Non-Proliferation Treaty. The same themes would continue throughout the election campaign, and the close result of the election would grant Whitlam momentum for further change at the 1971 conference. For Whitlam, his leadership's public focus on civil liberties, equity and fairness would begin at this conference 1969 and would continue throughout his two terms as prime minister and beyond.

In a very profound sense, the cause of Labor is the cause of national unity. Equality and quality of opportunity, equality of life and more quality in life, go together. Our opponents, by contrast, seek to divide, and thereby to rule. All too often, all too tragically, they have succeeded.

— Gough Whitlam, 28th Australian Labor Party National Conference, Melbourne, Victoria, 28 July 1969

=== "If we fail, all Australians fail" ===
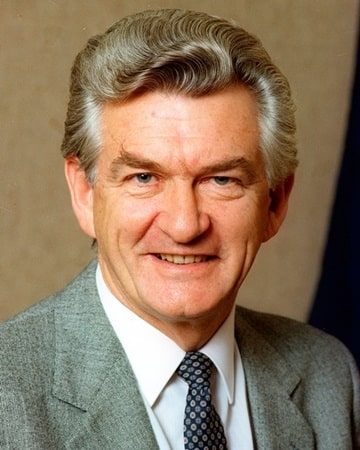
Bob Hawke served as prime minister from 1983 to 1991

Bob Hawke won a landslide victory in the 1983 Australian federal election, and followed it up with two more victories in 1984 and 1987, making him the only Labor leader to win three consecutive elections. He would go on to win a fourth term in 1990.

Hawke drew upon his wide popularity to win consensus for the government's numerous systematic economic reforms. However, his prime ministership saw friction between himself and the grassroots of the Labor Party, who were unhappy at what they viewed as Hawke's iconoclasm and willingness to co-operate with business interests.

The key issues of the Hawke government were globalisation, micro-economic reform and industrial relations. The opening of Australian finance and industry to global competition and the restructuring of the role of trade unions represented one of the most extensive undertakings of micro-economic reform in Australia's first century.

His speech at the 38th National Conference would serve as an important review of the government's achievements to date, which included floating the Australian dollar, the Prices and Incomes Accord, establishing Medicare, dismantling the restrictive tariff system and widening unemployment benefits and other welfare payments. However, it was also an important milestone in his efforts to maintain support within the party for continued reform into the 1990s.

"Most of all they would set aside the absolutely vital task of economic reconstruction. They would once again shirk the challenge of reform they simply do not have the capacity, wit or guts for the task. That, however, delegates, should make us not the more complacent but the more diligent in ensuring they stay in the wilderness. That is a task in which all of us share a responsibility from Cabinet Minister to branch member. I exclude none of us from this task. I pledge myself to it. We must bear the shared responsibility because the best interests of the Australian people demand it. In a very real sense, if we fail, all Australians fail."

— Bob Hawke, 38th Australian Labor Party National Conference, Hobart, Tasmania, 8 June 1988

=== "My name's Kevin, I'm from Queensland, I'm here to help" ===
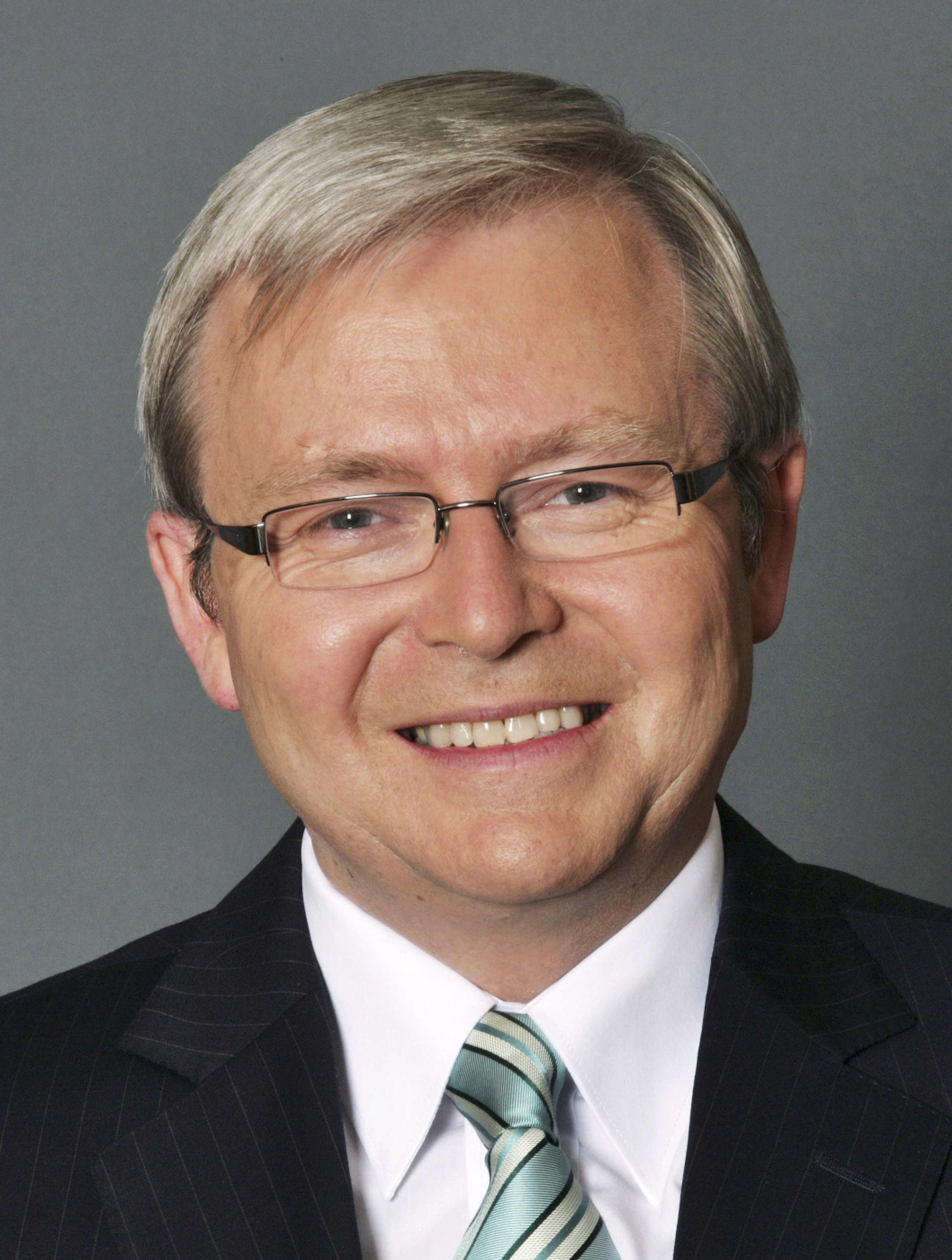
Kevin Rudd as Leader of the Opposition in 2007

Kevin Rudd had been elected leader of the Australian Labor Party in December 2006, just four months before their 44th National Conference. His speech to party faithful in April 2007 was widely reported at the time, with significant focus on the opening line "My name's Kevin, I'm from Queensland, I'm here to help" framing the conference as the beginning of a fresh approach for the party leading to the 2007 Australian federal election.

Rudd's speech touched on several themes that would continue into the election campaign, including the economic and geopolitical rise of China and India, the impacts of climate change, building long-term economic prosperity and national security. There was a strong focus on contrasting his own "forward-looking" approach with the "tired" Howard government, which had been in power for 11 years.

"There comes a time in the affairs of nations when they are forced to think afresh about the challenges they face for the future. Sometimes this happens at a time of crisis – such as when the very existence of the nation itself comes under threat. Other times it happens gradually – when changes evolve into challenges, and when challenges, if ignored, evolve into threats. One thing we know for certain is that the history of nations is made up of those who understand, anticipate and act on the challenges of the future. And those who do not. Those who instead bury their heads in the sand. Those who hope it will all just go away. And that, friends, is the crossroads we are approaching today, here in this great country of ours."

— Kevin Rudd, 44th Australian Labor Party National Conference, Sydney, New South Wales, 27 April 2007

=== "It is a campaign for those we love" ===
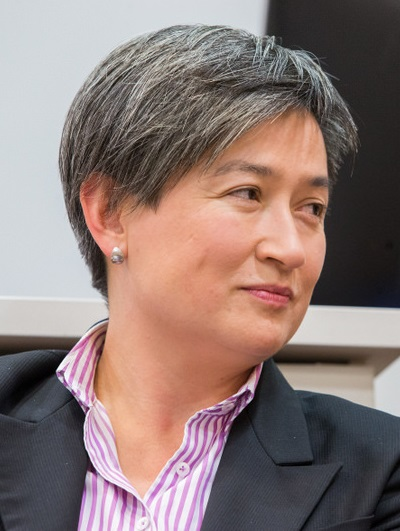
Senator Penny Wong in 2015

Senator Penny Wong drew wide admiration for her July 2015 speech supporting marriage equality at Labor's 46th National Conference in Melbourne. Wong had been a strong supporter of including marriage equality in the National Platform for over a decade, and was instrumental in the successful 2011 vote to include a statement supporting changing federal law. She was seconding a motion to bind members of the parliamentary Labor Party to vote in favour of marriage equality in federal parliament. She received an immediate one minute standing ovation by conference attendees prior to speaking and was moved to tears.

Speaking on being bound to vote "no" on the question of marriage equality prior to the 2011 National Conference, Wong passionately reflected: "I was asked to vote for my own discrimination." Wong was the first openly lesbian member of Australian parliament when she took her senate seat in 2002.

"There is nothing to fear from equality. Progress is never easily won. Reform is never easily won. LGBTI Australians deserve equal treatment before the law. The aspiration for equality is remarkably persistent. We will continue until we win. Marriage equality is a campaign of hope. It is a campaign of justice. It is a campaign of equality, but most of all, delegates – and this is why we will win – it is a campaign for those we love".

— Penny Wong, 46th Australian Labor Party National Conference, Melbourne, Victoria, 26 July 2015

Ultimately, a compromise was achieved where the motion was passed but would not take immediate effect, meaning any vote to legalise same-sex marriage in parliament within the next term would not bind members to vote in favour. However, as a result of the compromise, Labor Leader Bill Shorten pledged to introduce legislation to legalise same-sex marriage within 100 days of winning the next election, which followed his earlier introduction of a bill into the Australian House of Representatives to amend the Marriage Act.

== List of National Conferences ==
Order	Year	Location	Parliamentary status	Party leader	National President	National Secretary	Ref
50th	2026	Adelaide, South Australia	Majority Government	Anthony Albanese	Kate Ellis	Paul Erickson	
49th	2023	Brisbane, Queensland	Majority Government	Anthony Albanese	Wayne Swan	Paul Erickson	
Special	2021	Virtual	Opposition	Anthony Albanese	Wayne Swan	Paul Erickson	
48th	2018	Adelaide, South Australia	Opposition	Bill Shorten	Wayne Swan	Noah Carroll	
47th	2015	Melbourne, Victoria	Opposition	Bill Shorten	Mark Butler	George Wright	
46th	2011	Sydney, New South Wales	Minority Government	Julia Gillard	Jenny McAllister	George Wright	
45th	2009	Sydney, New South Wales	Majority Government	Kevin Rudd	Michael Williamson	Karl Bitar	
44th	2007	Sydney, New South Wales	Opposition	Kevin Rudd	John Faulkner	Tim Gartrell	
43rd	2004	Sydney, New South Wales	Opposition	Mark Latham	Carmen Lawrence	Tim Gartrell	
42nd	2000	Hobart, Tasmania	Opposition	Kim Beazley	Greg Sword	Geoff Walsh	
41st	1998	Hobart, Tasmania	Opposition	Kim Beazley	Barry Jones	Gary Gray	
40th	1994	Hobart, Tasmania	Majority Government	Paul Keating	Barry Jones	Gary Gray	
39th	1991	Hobart, Tasmania	Majority Government	Bob Hawke	Stephen Loosley	Bob Hogg	
Special	1990	Canberra, ACT	Majority Government	Bob Hawke	Stephen Loosley	Bob Hogg	
38th	1988	Hobart, Tasmania	Majority Government	Bob Hawke	John Bannon	Bob Hogg	
37th	1986	Hobart, Tasmania	Majority Government	Bob Hawke	Mick Young	Bob McMullan	
36th	1984	Canberra, ACT	Majority Government	Bob Hawke	Neville Wran	Bob McMullan	
35th	1982	Canberra, ACT	Opposition	Bill Hayden	Neville Wran	Bob McMullan	
34th	1981	Melbourne, Victoria	Opposition	Bill Hayden	Neville Wran	Bob McMullan	
33rd	1979	Adelaide, South Australia	Opposition	Bill Hayden	Neil Batt	David Combe	
32nd	1977	Perth, Western Australia	Opposition	Gough Whitlam	Bob Hawke	David Combe	
31st	1975	Terrigal, New South Wales	Majority Government	Gough Whitlam	Bob Hawke	David Combe	
30th	1973	Gold Coast, Queensland	Majority Government	Gough Whitlam	Bob Hawke	David Combe	
29th	1971	Launceston, Tasmania	Opposition	Gough Whitlam	Tom Burns	Mick Young	
28th	1969	Melbourne, Victoria	Opposition	Gough Whitlam	Jim Keeffe	Mick Young	
27th	1967	Adelaide, South Australia	Opposition	Gough Whitlam	Jim Keeffe	Cyril Wyndham	
Special	1966	Canberra, ACT	Opposition	Arthur Calwell	Jim Keeffe	Cyril Wyndham	
Special	1966	Canberra, ACT	Opposition	Arthur Calwell	Jim Keeffe	Cyril Wyndham	
26th	1965	Sydney, New South Wales	Opposition	Arthur Calwell	Jim Keeffe	Cyril Wyndham	
25th	1963	Perth, Western Australia	Opposition	Arthur Calwell	Jim Keeffe	Cyril Wyndham	
Special	1963	Canberra, ACT	Opposition	Arthur Calwell	Jim Keeffe	Joe Chamberlain	
24th	1961	Canberra, ACT	Opposition	Arthur Calwell	Bill Colbourne	Joe Chamberlain	
23rd	1959	Canberra, ACT	Opposition	H. V. Evatt	Joe Chamberlain	Jack Schmella	
22nd	1957	Brisbane, Queensland	Opposition	H. V. Evatt	Joe Chamberlain	Jack Schmella	
21st	1955	Hobart, Tasmania	Opposition	H. V. Evatt	Joe Chamberlain	Jack Schmella	
20th	1953	Adelaide, South Australia	Opposition	H. V. Evatt	Denis Lovegrove	Pat Kennelly	
19th	1951	Canberra, ACT	Opposition	Ben Chifley	John Ferguson	Pat Kennelly	
18th	1948	Canberra, ACT	Majority Government	Ben Chifley	Abner McAlpine	Pat Kennelly	
17th	1945	Melbourne, Victoria	Majority Government	Ben Chifley	Fred Walsh	Daniel McNamara	
16th	1943	Canberra, ACT and Sydney, New South Wales	Minority Government	John Curtin	Clarrie Fallon	Daniel McNamara	
Special	1943	Melbourne, Victoria	Minority Government	John Curtin	Clarrie Fallon	Daniel McNamara	
Special	1942	Melbourne, Victoria	Minority Government	John Curtin	Clarrie Fallon	Daniel McNamara	
15th	1939	Canberra, ACT	Opposition	John Curtin	Clarrie Fallon	Daniel McNamara	
14th	1936	Adelaide, South Australia	Opposition	John Curtin	Norman Makin	Daniel McNamara	
13th	1933	Sydney, New South Wales	Opposition	James Scullin	James Kenneally	Daniel McNamara	
Special	1931	Melbourne, Victoria	Majority Government	James Scullin	James Kenneally	Daniel McNamara	
Special	1931	Sydney, New South Wales	Majority Government	James Scullin	James Kenneally	Daniel McNamara	
12th	1930	Canberra, ACT	Majority Government	James Scullin	James Kenneally	Daniel McNamara	
11th	1927	Canberra, ACT	Opposition	Matthew Charlton	Joseph Hannan	Daniel McNamara	
10th	1924	Melbourne, Victoria	Opposition	Matthew Charlton	Joseph Hannan	Arch Stewart	
9th	1921	Brisbane, Queensland	Opposition	Frank Tudor	Jack Holloway	Arch Stewart	
Special	1919	Sydney, New South Wales	Opposition	Frank Tudor	Jack Holloway	Arch Stewart	
8th	1919	Sydney, New South Wales	Opposition	Frank Tudor	Jack Holloway	Arch Stewart	
7th	1918	Perth, Western Australia	Opposition	Frank Tudor	Jack Holloway	Arch Stewart	
Special	1916	Melbourne, Victoria	Majority Government	Frank Tudor	Jack Holloway	Arch Stewart	
6th	1915	Adelaide, South Australia	Majority Government	Billy Hughes	Thomas Givens	Arch Stewart	
5th	1912	Hobart, Tasmania	Majority Government	Andrew Fisher	John Earle (Note: Earle has served as Leader of the Tasmanian Labor Party since 1906, and was briefly Premier of Tasmania in 1909, a position he would occupy again in 1914. He was elected "President" of the 1912 Commonwealth Conference.)	James Guy (Note: Guy served as General Secretary of the Tasmanian Labor Party, a member of the Tasmanian House of Assembly and "Honorary Secretary" for the 1912 Commonwealth Conference.)	
4th	1908	Brisbane, Queensland	Minority government	Andrew Fisher	Andrew Fisher (Note: Fisher was unanimously elected "President" of the 1908 Commonwealth Conference after Matthew Reid was nominated but declined the position.)	Albert Hinchcliffe (Note: Hinchcliffe was the Secretary of the Queensland Trades and Labour Council and a member of the Queensland Legislative Council, he served as "Honorary Secretary" for the 1908 Commonwealth Conference.)	
3rd	1905	Melbourne, Victoria	Opposition	Chris Watson	George Prendergast (Note: Prendergast served as Leader of the Victorian Labor Party and Leader of the Opposition in Victoria. He was elected "Chairman" of the 1905 Commonwealth Conference.)	Patrick Heagney (Note: Heagney, Secretary of the Victorian Labor Party was elected "Secretary" of the 1905 Commonwealth Conference.)	
2nd	1902	Sydney, New South Wales	External support	Chris Watson	Chris Watson (Note: Watson, already leader of the Federal Parliamentary Labor Party, was elected "President" of the 1902 Commonwealth Conference. However, he stated a preference that Hector Lamond be elected. Lamond he did not nominate to be a delegate.)	Albert Hinchcliffe (Note: Hinchcliffe was serving as the Secretary of the Queensland Trades and Labour Council and was appointed "Secretary" of the 1902 Commonwealth Conference.)	
1st	1900	Sydney, New South Wales	Pre-Federation	No federal leader	James Wilson (Note: Wilson was President of the Labor Council of New South Wales, a member of the New South Wales Legislative Council and served as "President" at the first ALP Conference.)	George Jones (Note: Jones was Secretary of the Political Labour League and would later serve as a member of the New South Wales Legislative Assembly. He was "Secretary" of the 1900 National Conference.)	

- Known as the Commonwealth Conference from 1900 to 1971, and the Federal Conference in 1931, 1973
- A formal National Executive was not established until 1915. Until that time, there was no National President or National Secretary. At each conference, a president/chairman and secretary were elected from delegates present and served for the length of the conference.

=== Special conferences ===
Special Conferences are those which are not regularly scheduled biennial/triennial conferences, but are instead called by party leadership (either by the National Executive or the federal parliamentary caucus). These are usually called to resolve specific policy or structural party issues, and are often named as such.

Conference	Conference Name	Issue/Policy
2021	Special Platform Conference	COVID-19 pandemic leading to postponement of 49th conference to 2023 (first ever completely virtual party conference)
1990	Special National Conference	Privatization of government-owned entities including Qantas and Commonwealth Bank
July 1966	Special Commonwealth Conference	Allegations of gross disloyalty against prominent party members regarding the issue of State Aid
March 1966	Special Commonwealth Conference	Allegations of gross disloyalty against prominent party members regarding the issue of State Aid
1963	Special Commonwealth Conference on Foreign Affairs and Defence	Cold War diplomatic relations, Nuclear Non-proliferation
1942–1943	Special Commonwealth Conferences	Price-fixing, inflation, issues related to Australia's involvement in World War II and post-war reconstruction
August 1931	Special Federal Conference	Australian Labor Party split of 1931
March 1931	Special Federal Conference	Australian Labor Party split of 1931
October 1919	Special Commonwealth Conference	Structural issues and rebuilding the ALP following the Australian Labor Party split of 1916
1916	Special Commonwealth Conference Called to deal with matters arising out of the Conscription Issue	World War I conscription in Australia and subsequent Australian Labor Party split of 1916

=== Intercolonial Trades Union Congresses ===
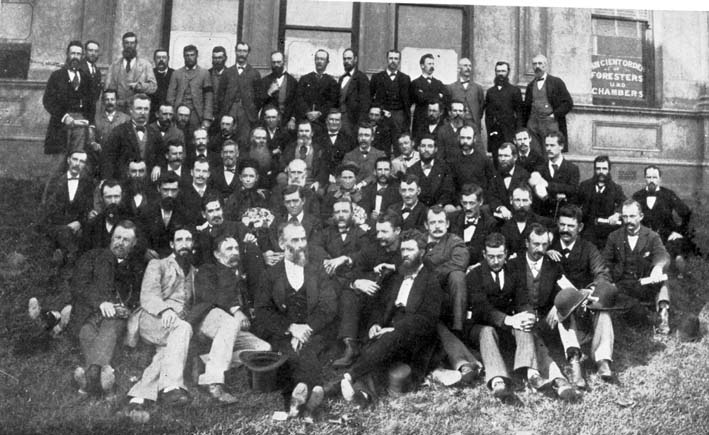
Delegates at the Intercolonial Trades Union Conference, 1884

Prior to federation and the subsequent creation of the Australian Labor Party, the labour movement consisted of dozens of trade unions organised around trades and labour councils. The first labour council in Australia was the Melbourne Trades Hall Committee, formed in 1856.

By the time of the First Intercolonial Trades Union Congress in 1879, there was a trades and labour council in each Australian capital city, along with several more in regional centres. The Intercolonial Trades Union Congresses were a means for Australian labour organisations to collectively organise themselves, discuss issues of concern to all unions and encourage the formation of parliamentary committees in each of the self-governing colonies. The First Congress report states that "it was established that the labour organisations of Australasia were practically unanimous in holding certain opinions in social politics."

Political reform remained high on the agenda of subsequent congresses, and they proved instrumental in the development of an Australian Labor Party. At the time of the first congress in 1879, there was no formalised Labor Party in any jurisdiction in Australia. By 1899, every colony had an established political labour party, with the exception of Tasmania which followed in 1903.

Year	Conference Name	Location	Organising Body	Delegates	Issues/resolutions	Ref
1898	Eighth Intercolonial Trades Union Congress of Australasia (Note: Also referred to as the Intercolonial Labor Conference of 1898)	Adelaide, South Australia	United Trades and Labour Council of South Australia	31	Resolution supporting an Australian minimum wage	
1891	Seventh Intercolonial Trades Union Congress of Australasia	Ballarat, Victoria	Ballarat Regional Trades and Labour Council	127	Resolution passed accepting the constitution of the Australian Labour Federation	
1889	Sixth Intercolonial Trades Union Congress	Hobart, Tasmania	Hobart Trades & Labor Council	58	Resolution passed pronouncing that 'tradesmen' did not occupy a superior position to labourers	
1888	Fifth Intercolonial Trades Union Congress	Brisbane, Queensland	Trades and Labour Council	64	Resolution passed supporting the Single tax	
1886	Fourth Intercolonial Trades Union Congress	Adelaide, South Australia	United Trades and Labour Council of South Australia	70	Resolution passed supporting the direct representation of the labour movement in parliament	
1885	Third Intercolonial Trades Union Congress	Sydney, New South Wales	Trades & Labor Council of Sydney	99		
1884	Second Intercolonial Trades Union Congress	Melbourne, Victoria	Melbourne Trades Hall Committee	69	Resolution passed supporting payment of Members of Parliament	
1879	First Intercolonial Trades Union Congress	Sydney, New South Wales	Trades & Labor Council of Sydney	39	Resolutions passed against non-white immigration	

== List of ALP National Platforms ==
Conference	Year	Platform Title	Ref
50th	2026	Delivering Real Change (Draft)	
49th	2023	Australian Labor Party National Platform	
Special	2021	ALP National Platform	
48th	2018	A Fair Go For Australia	
47th	2015	A smart, modern, fair Australia	
46th	2011	Australian Labor National Platform	
45th	2009	Australian Labor Party National Platform	
44th	2007	National Platform and Constitution 2007	
43rd	2004	Australian Labor Party National Platform 2004	
42nd	2000	Australian Labor Party: 2000 Platform and Constitution	
41st	1998	Constitution and 1998 ALP Platform	
40th	1994	Australian Labor Party platform, resolutions and rules	
39th	1991	Australian Labor Party 1991 Platform	
Special	1990	Australian Labor Party Special National Conference	
38th	1988	Australian Labor Party Platform, Resolutions and Rules	
37th	1986	Australian Labor Party Platform, Resolutions and Rules	
36th	1984	Australian Labor Party Platform, Constitution and Rules	
35th	1982	Australian Labor Party Platform, Constitution and Rules	
34th	1981	Australian Labor Party Decisions of 1981 National Conference	
33rd	1979	Australian Labor Party Platform, Constitution and Rules	
32nd	1977	Australian Labor Party Platform, Constitution and Rules	
31st	1975	Australian Labor Party Platform, Constitution and Rules	
30th	1973	Australian Labor Party Platform, Constitution and Rules	
29th	1971	Australian Labor Party Platform, Constitution and Rules	
28th	1969	Australian Labor Party Platform, Constitution and Rules	
27th	1967	Australian Labor Party Platform, Constitution and Rules	
Special	1966	Special Commonwealth Conference, July 1966: report, findings and documents	
Special	1966	Special Commonwealth Conference, March 1966: report, findings and documents	
26th	1965	Australian Labor Party Federal Platform, Constitution and Rules	
Special	1963	Special Commonwealth Conference on Foreign Affairs and Defence	
25th	1963	Australian Labor Party Federal Platform, Constitution and Rules	
24th	1961	Australian Labor Party Federal Platform, Constitution and Rules	
23rd	1959	Federal Platform and Objective	
22nd	1957	Federal Platform and Objective	
21st	1955	Federal Platform and Objective	
20th	1953	Federal Platform and Objective	
19th	1951	Federal Platform and Objective	
18th	1948	Federal Platform and Objective	
17th	1945	Federal Platform and Objective	
16th	1943	Federal Platform and Objective	
Special	1942–1943	Federal Platform and Objective	
15th	1939	Platform and Objective	
14th	1936	Platform and Objective	
13th	1933	Platform and Objective	
Special	August 1931	Special Federal Conference Melbourne, 1931	
Special	March 1931	Special Federal Conference Sydney, 1931	
12th	1930	Platform and Objective	
11th	1927	Platform and Constitution	
10th	1924	Platform and Constitution	
9th	1921	Platform and Constitution	
Special	October 1919	Official Report of the Special Commonwealth Conference	
8th	June 1919	Fighting and General Platform	
7th	1918	Fighting and General Platform	
Special	1916	Report of Proceedings of the Special Commonwealth Conference	
6th	1915	Official Report of the Sixth Commonwealth Conference	
5th	1912	Fifth Conference of the Australian Labor Party	
4th	1908	Fourth Commonwealth Political Labour Conference	
3rd	1905	Third Commonwealth Political Labour Conference	
2nd	1902	Commonwealth Labour Conference	
1st	1900	Federal Labour Party Platform	

== See also ==
- Faceless men
- History of the Australian Labor Party
- Politics of Australia
- The light on the hill
