= Cyril Wyndham =

British-Australian Labor Party secretary

National Secretary of the Labor Party
- In office 29 July 1963 – 27 March 1969
- Leader: Arthur Calwell; Gough Whitlam
- Preceded by: Joe Chamberlain
- Succeeded by: Mick Young

Secretary of the Victorian Labor Party
- In office 20 October 1960 – 29 July 1963
- Leader: Clive Stoneham
- Preceded by: John Tripovich

Personal details
- Born: Cyril Stanley Isaacs; 1930 London, England
- Died: 2012 (aged 81–82) Newcastle, New South Wales
- Party: Australian Labor Party
- Other political affiliations: British Labour Party
- Spouse: Nola
- Education: London School of Economics
- Profession: Trade unionist Political organiser

Cyril Stanley Wyndham (1930–2012) was an English-born Australian politician and political organiser who served as the first professional National Secretary of the Australian Labor Party from 1963 to 1969. Prior to his election to the position at the 1963 Australian Labor Party National Conference, the party's most senior operational executive was part-time and unpaid, with the Labor Party being largely de-centralised and organised out of its state branches. Under Wyndham's stewardship, the Labor Party underwent fundamental transformation throughout the 1960s, becoming a more centralised, professional, expert and parliamentarist political institution.

== Career ==
Wyndham worked as an organiser and party official for the Labour Party in London from 1948 until he accepted a position working for H.V. Evatt, the Leader of the Australian Labor Party in 1957. Evatt was impressed with Wyndham (then still known as Cyril Isaacs) as he hosted the Australian delegation to the 1957 Commonwealth Labour Parties' Conference.

He changed his surname from Isaacs to Wyndham once he arrived in Australia, and again impressed the Labor leader with his diligence and loyalty. He worked alongside Evatt during the 1958 Australian federal election campaign, co-authoring his election policy speech. He served on the staff of Evatt's successor as Labor Leader, Arthur Calwell, becoming his press secretary.

In 1960, Wyndham nominated for the newly vacated position of secretary of the Victorian branch of the Labor Party, winning the support of the state executive over 11 other candidates.

Following significant lobbying of state branches by Joe Chamberlain and other members of the national executive, the position of a full-time salaried Labor federal secretary was advertised in January 1961. Cyril Wyndham was encouraged to throw his hat into the ring and the executive unanimously selected him from a field of five candidates. He was formally elected at the 1963 national conference.

In 1964, the National Executive commissioned Wyndham to prepare recommendations for changes in the party's structure that had been virtually unchanged since 1901. His recommendations, which became known as the Wyndham Plan, faced fierce opposition from prominent members of the party's "old guard," including his immediate predecessor Joe Chamberlain.

In 1967, and With the strong support of new Labor Leader Gough Whitlam, Wyndham continued to push reforms targeting both the structure and policy-making processes of the party. Together they targeted reform in representation of the parliamentary party leadership on the federal executive, direct representation for ordinary members and reducing the power of paid officials. Most importantly, Wyndham and Whitlam were able to persuade the 1967 conference to accept changes which created a permanent inflow of parliamentary leaders from the states on to the Australian Labor Party National Executive and National Conference. These reforms changed the balance of power within the party in favour of the parliamentary wing and away from the "faceless men" of union officials and other unelected party apparatchiks.

Following significant pressure from opponents within the national executive, which included the opening of an investigation into his management of national secretariat expenses, Wyndham resigned his position as national secretary on 27 March 1969. Following his resignation, the national secretariat in Canberra remained non-operational for over 2 years as his immediate successor, Mick Young, continued to serve as the secretary of the South Australian branch.

== Publications ==
- Wyndham, Cyril (1964); The unbridgeable gulf between democratic socialism and communism; Australian Labor Party Discussion Paper
- Wyndham, Cyril (1965); The National Civic Council: a closer look; Australian Labor Party Discussion Paper
- Wyndham, Cyril (1966); The Future of the ALP; Australian Institute of Political Science; Australian Quarterly 1966-06 Vol.38 (2), p. 29-40; ISSN 0005-0091
- Wyndham, Cyril (1968); Labor Party Advertising — The Correct Perspective; Australian Institute of Political Science; Australian Quarterly 1968-09, Vol.40 (3), p. 19-25; ISSN 0005-0091
