= James Stout (trade unionist) =

Australian trade unionist

Vic Stout

National President of the Labor Party
- In office February 1961 – July 1961
- Leader: Arthur Calwell
- Preceded by: Joe Chamberlain
- Succeeded by: Bill Colbourne

Secretary of the Melbourne Trades Hall Council
- In office 1938–1964
- Preceded by: Albert Monk
- Succeeded by: Mick Jordan

Personal details
- Born: James Victor Stout; 10 August 1885 Port Melbourne, Colony of Victoria
- Died: 13 March 1964 (aged 78) St Vincent's Hospital, Melbourne, Australia
- Party: Labor
- Other political affiliations: Victorian Socialist Party (1906)
- Spouse: Maud Mary Newton (m. 1912; died 1955)
- Occupation: Union official

James Victor "Vic" Stout (10 August 1885 – 13 March 1964) was an Australian trade unionist and political party official who served as the National President of the Australian Labor Party from February to July 1961, and as Secretary of the Melbourne Trades Hall Council from 1938 until his death. He additionally served five separate terms as President of the Victorian Labor Party.

== Career ==
James Victor Stout was born in Port Melbourne and attended local state schools in the depths of the 1890s depression. He worked in the boot trade and later in a draper's shop. From 1907, when the drapers combined with other retail workers to form the Shop Assistants' Union of Victoria, he became more active in union affairs.

=== Trades Hall ===
In 1924, Stout was appointed an organiser for the Shop Assistants' Union, and in 1933 was elected president of the Melbourne Trades Hall Council, the peak body representing unions in Victoria. He served in this position for just one year, however remained a member of the Trades Hall Committee Executive as a representative of the Shop Assistants' Union. In 1938, Stout was elected Secretary of the Trades Hall Council. He remained in this position until his death in 1964, suffering a heart attack in his Trades Hall office and dying in hospital the next day. Stout was also elected as a union representative member of the Victorian Industrial Appeals Court.

=== State politics ===
After serving as secretary of the Toorak branch of the Labor Party, Stout was nominated as the party's candidate for the Victorian Legislative Assembly seat of Toorak in 1920. He lost to Nationalist candidate Stanley Argyle, who would later go on to become premier. He contested the same district at the 1929 election, again losing to Argyle. Stout contested the neighbouring district of Toorak at the 1932 election, losing to United Australia Party candidate and Mayor of the City of Prahran, John Ellis. He was later elected to the state Labor executive, and served as president of the state party on five different occasions, the first being 1942.

=== National president ===
Stout was elected National President of the Australian Labor Party at a meeting of the National Executive in Hobart in February 1961. The vacancy was caused by the resignation of incumbent president Joe Chamberlain, who was unanimously elected national secretary at the same meeting. At a meeting held in Brisbane in July the same year, Stout was defeated in repeat ballot for the presidency by New South Wales branch secretary Bill Colbourne. In a vote of 12 national executive members, the candidates were tied on 6 votes each and Colbourne won the presidency after his name was drawn from a hat.

== See also ==
- Australian Labor Party National Executive
- Australian Labor Party split of 1955
