= Alan Reid (journalist) =

Australian journalist (1914–1987)

Alan Douglas Joseph Reid (19 December 1914 – 1 September 1987), nicknamed the Red Fox, was an Australian political journalist, who worked in the Federal Parliamentary Press Gallery from 1937 to 1985. He is noted for his role in the Australian Labor Party split of 1955 and his coinage of the term "36 faceless men" to describe the members of the Australian Labor Party's Federal Conference.

== Biography ==
Reid was born on 19 December 1914 in Toxteth, an inner-city area of Liverpool, England, to William Douglas Reid, a New Zealand-born Scottish steamship officer, and Margaret Reid (née Senar). When Reid was aged eleven, his father had a career-ending accident, after which the family emigrated to Australia in 1927, settling in the Sydney suburb of Paddington. He attended the St Francis of Assisi Christian Brothers school in Paddington, St Patrick's College, Goulburn, and Waverley College, Sydney. After leaving school, he did several odd jobs in the outback regions of New South Wales and Queensland, until he was hired as a copy boy for The Sun, Sydney's afternoon newspaper, by Robert Clyde Packer. Reid became interested in politics after being inspired by the speeches of the state Labor Party leader Jack Lang. In 1937, he was posted to Canberra as a political reporter for The Sydney Sun. In 1940 he married Joan Drummond, a stenographer, in sydney; the couple had two sons and a daughter.

He was initially unimpressed with Labor leader John Curtin, in private calling him "a namby-pamby", but his views changed when Curtin became prime minister. Reid commented favourably on his decisiveness after the Japanese attack on Pearl Harbor, and developed a close relationship with both Curtin and the Labor prime minister Ben Chifley. In 1949 Robert Menzies, the founder of the Liberal Party of Australia, became prime minister in a coalition with the Country Party. Reid initially resented his efforts to limit media access to sensitive information, and in 1954 he published an article claiming that the announcement of the Petrov Affair was orchestrated to coincide with Labor leader H. V. Evatt's absence from Canberra. In September 1954, Reid published an exposé in The Sydney Sun of B. A. Santamaria, writing,

"In the tense melodrama of politics there are mysterious figures who stand virtually unnoticed in the wings, invisible to all but a few of the audience, as they cue, Svengali-like, among the actors out on the stage."

Evatt's panicked reaction to that piece led to the Australian Labor Party split of 1955.

In 1954, Reid moved to The Daily Telegraph, owned by Frank Packer, Menzies' staunchest ally among media proprietors. Despite working with Packer, Reid continued to be a member of the Labor Party until he was dismissed in 1957. Menzies' relationship with Reid became closer after his move to The Daily Telegraph, and on the eve of the 1961 federal election, Reid advised Menzies to make a public pledge to restore full employment, after his economic credibility was dented due to a recession earlier that year. In March 1963, Reid commissioned a photograph of Labor leader Arthur Calwell and his deputy Gough Whitlam standing outside a conference of the Australian Labor Party National Executive, waiting to find out their party's policy towards an American military base in Australia. The iconic photograph and the attached story, which showed the leaders' lack of involvement in the policy decisions of their own party, damaged its image. Menzies' subsequent use of Reid's phrase "the thirty-six faceless men" to describe the members of the Federal Conference of the Labor Party helped him win the 1963 federal election.

After Harold Holt drowned in 1967, Packer wanted William McMahon to succeed him as Liberal Party leader. However the Country Party vetoed this idea and The Daily Telegraph supported his eventual successor, John Gorton. In his book The Power Struggle, Reid alleged that Governor-General Richard Casey had improperly intervened in political affairs by preventing McMahon from becoming prime minister after Holt's death. Reid broke many of the stories that led to Gorton's resignation as prime minister and his replacement with McMahon in 1971.

Reid opposed the policies of Labor prime minister Gough Whitlam, and in a column for The Bulletin, he insisted that the Labor Party was in the thrall of "trendies", led by the government advisor H. C. Coombs. He retired due to illness in 1985 and died aged72 on 1 September 1987 in the Sydney suburb of Bayview from lung and stomach cancer, related to his smoking habit.

== Legacy ==
A biography of Reid, Alan 'The Red Fox' Reid: Pressman Par Excellence, by Ross Fitzgerald and Stephen Holt, with a foreword by Laurie Oakes, was published in 2010. In 2015 Reid's novel The Bandar Log was posthumously published. It was written in 1958 and inspired by the 1955 Labor split. Not only had Reid been unable to find a publisher, but in 1961 the District Court had ruled that it was defamatory, despite being unpublished. The manuscript was found in Reid's papers at the Mitchell Library by his biographer Ross Fitzgerald, who edited it and arranged its publication over 27 years after the author's death.

== Publications ==
- Reid, Alan (1969). The Power Struggle. Sydney: Shakespeare Head Press.
- Reid, Alan (1971). The Gorton Experiment. Sydney: Shakespeare Head Press. ISBN 978-0-85558-048-3.
- Reid, Alan (1976). The Whitlam Venture. Melbourne: Hill of Content. ISBN 978-0-85572-079-7.
- Reid, Alan (2015). The Bandar Log. Connor Court.
