= Jack Schmella =

Australian Labor Party secretary

National Secretary of the Labor Party
- In office 14 July 1954 – 18 July 1960
- Leader: H. V. Evatt; Arthur Calwell
- Preceded by: Pat Kennelly
- Succeeded by: Joe Chamberlain

Secretary of the Queensland Labor Party
- In office 1 August 1952 – 18 July 1960
- Leader: Vince Gair; Jack Duggan
- Preceded by: Sydney James Bryan
- Succeeded by: Jim Keeffe

Personal details
- Born: John Mattao Sciarmella; 24 February 1908 Charters Towers, Queensland, Australia
- Died: 18 July 1960 (aged 52) St Lucia, Queensland
- Resting place: Toowong Cemetery
- Party: Australian Labor Party
- Spouse: Gladys Parsons
- Children: 2
- Education: Mount Carmel Christian Brothers College
- Occupation: Miner; Union official

John "Jack" Schmella (24 February 1908– 18 July 1960) was an Australian trade unionist and political party official who served as the National Secretary of the Australian Labor Party from 1954 to 1960 and as Secretary of Queensland Labor from 1952 to 1960. Prior to his elevation to party administration, Schmella worked as a miner, an industrial chemist and later as an industrial officer for the Australian Workers' Union.

Schmella played a key role in the Australian Labor Party split of 1955, having moved the successful motion to have the Australian Labor Party (Queensland Branch) leader and premier Vince Gair expelled from the party, leading to the formation of the breakaway Queensland Labor Party and subsequent collapse of the state government.

== See also ==
- Australian Labor Party National Executive
- Queensland Labor Party (1957)
- Australian Labor Party split of 1955
