= 2018 Australian Labor Party National Conference =

48th triennial National Conference of the Australian Labor Party

The 2018 Australian Labor Party National Conference was the 48th triennial National Conference of the Australian Labor Party. It took place in Adelaide from Sunday 16 to Tuesday 18 December 2018. Over 2,000 people attended.

== Scheduling of the conference ==
The conference was originally scheduled for 26–28 July. However, on 24 May, the Liberal Speaker of the House of Representatives, Tony Smith, announced that five by-elections — four were caused by the 2017-18 Australian parliamentary eligibility crisis — would be held on 28 July. Labor accused the Speaker of being "disgraceful and sneaky" over the timing, and announced that it would postpone the conference to enable the party to campaign. A week later, the new dates were announced.

== See also ==
- 2011 Australian Labor Party National Conference
