= Greg Sword =

Australian Labor Party president

Greg Sword AM

National President of the Labor Party
- In office 2000–2004
- Leader: Kim Beazley; Simon Crean; Mark Latham
- Preceded by: Barry Jones
- Succeeded by: Carmen Lawrence

General Secretary of the National Union of Workers
- In office 1984–2004
- Preceded by: Simon Crean
- Succeeded by: Charlie Donnelly

President of the Victorian Labor Party
- In office 1999–2003
- Leader: Steve Bracks
- Preceded by: Jim Claven
- Succeeded by: Brian Daley
- In office 1993–1995
- Leader: John Brumby
- Succeeded by: Jim Claven

Personal details
- Born: Gregory Brian Sword
- Party: Labor
- Occupation: Union official Company director
- Awards: Order of Australia (AM) (2010)

Gregory "Greg" Sword (born ) is an Australian trade unionist and retired political party official who served as the National President of the Australian Labor Party from 2000 to 2004. Prior to his election at the 42nd Labor Party National Conference, Sword served as the President of the Victorian Branch of the Labor Party from 1993 to 1995 and again from 1999 to 2003.

== Career ==
In addition to his roles within the Labor Party, Sword was National Secretary of the National Union of Workers from 1986 to 2004 and Senior Vice-president of the Australian Council of Trade Unions.

Sword also served as CEO of the Labour Union Co-operative Retirement Fund (LUCRF) between 1978 and 1982, and then later from 2006 until 2014. The LUCRF was a superannuation fund created by the Federated Storemen and Packers' Union of Australia prior to their 1989 merger to become the National Union of Workers. He served on the fund's board of directors until 2020. The fund merged with AustralianSuper in 2022.

He was also Asia Pacific Region President of the International Union of Food Workers (IUF) for 8 years, CEO of the Lake Tyers Aboriginal Trust, Chairman of St Vincent's Hospital, Melbourne, a member of the Metropolitan Fire Brigade board and a member of the Caulfield Racecourse Reserve Trust.

Sword was awarded the Medal of the Order of Australia (AM) in the General Division as part of the 2010 Australia Day Honours. He was awarded the honour for "service to the union movement, and to the community through leadership and voluntary roles in a range of organisations."

== IBAC Operation Richmond Adverse Findings ==
Sword was found by the Independent Broad-based Anti-corruption Commission to have shared confidential information with United Firefighters Union National Secretary Peter Marshall in 2019 in breach of his professional obligations.

== See also ==
- Australian Labor Party National Executive
- Australian Council of Trade Unions
- Faceless men
