= Australian Labor Party National Executive =

Top institution of the Australian Labor Party

- President: Kate Ellis
- Secretary: Paul Erickson
- Vice-President: Mich-Elle Myers
- Parliamentary Leader: Anthony Albanese
- Founded: 1915
- Headquarters: 5/9 Sydney Avenue, Canberra, Australian Capital Territory
- Membership (2026): 28

Website
- https://www.alp.org.au/about/national-executive/

The Australian Labor Party National Executive, often referred to as the National Executive, is the executive governing body of the Australian Labor Party (ALP), charged with directly overseeing the general organisation and strategy of the party. Twenty members of the National Executive are elected by the party's National Conference, which is the highest representative body of the party's state and territory branches. The other eight members are party ex-officio members.

Members on the Executive may be officials of trade unions affiliated to the party, members of federal or state Parliaments, or rank-and-file ALP members. The ex-officio members are the National President, the National Secretary and two National Vice-Presidents (who are directly elected by Labor members), and the Leader of the Federal Parliamentary Labor Party, but of these only the party Leader has a vote.

The National Executive is concerned mainly with organisational matters. It does not decide party policy, which is determined by the National Conference. The National Executive does not elect the party's parliamentary leaders, which is done by a ballot of both the Parliamentary Caucus and by the Labor Party's rank-and-file members. The National President or Vice-President are elected by party members. Its most public role is to act as the final arbiter of disputes about parliamentary candidacies (preselections). On these matters the National Executive usually votes on factional lines. The Labor Right faction holds a majority on the National Executive, though it did not hold a majority at the 2015 National Conference.

The power of the National Executive extends to the reorganisation of a State Branch. For example, in 1970 to improve the party's chances of electoral success, the National Executive intervened in the Socialist Left controlled Victorian Branch, involving the sacking of State officers and dissolution of the Branch. Less drastic forms of intervention are more common, such as the final arbiter of preselection disputes. The executive has authority over policy as it can interpret the party’s constitution, platform and conference decisions.

== Members of the National Executive ==
As of 2026, the current members of the National Executive are:

Member type	Member name	Position	Faction	State/territory	Voting member
Ex-officio members	Hon. Kate Ellis	National President	Right	South Australia	No
Ex-officio members	Paul Erickson	National Secretary	Left	(Victoria (state)) Victoria	No
Ex-officio members	Mich-Elle Myers	National Vice President	Left	New South Wales	No
Ex-officio members	Rhiannyn Douglas	National Vice President	Right	Queensland	No
Ex-officio members	Chris Hancock	National President of Young Labor	Right	Queensland	No
Ex-officio members	Nyat Mulugeta	National Labor Women's Network Co-Convenor	Left	Western Australia	No
Ex-officio members	Emily McMillan	National Labor Women's Network Co-Convenor	Right	New South Wales	No
Ex-officio members	Hon. Anthony Albanese MP	Leader of the Federal Parliamentary Labor Party	Left	New South Wales	Yes
Elected members	Senator the Hon. Tim Ayres	Senator for New South Wales	Left	New South Wales	Yes
Elected members	Gary Bullock	National Secretary, United Workers Union	Left	Queensland	Yes
Elected members	Senator Raff Ciccone	Senator for Victoria	Right	(Victoria (state)) Victoria	Yes
Elected members	Hon. Julie Collins MP	Member of the Australian House of Representatives for Franklin	Left	Tasmania	Yes
Elected members	Melissa Donnelly	National Secretary, Community and Public Sector Union	Left	Australian Capital Territory	Yes
Elected members	Sandra Doumit	National Vice-president, Australian Workers' Union	Right	New South Wales	Yes
Elected members	Hon. Kate Doust MLC	Member of the Legislative Council of Western Australia	Right	Western Australia	Yes
Elected members	Gerard Dwyer	National Secretary, Shop, Distributive and Allied Employees Association	Right	New South Wales	Yes
Elected members	Emeline Gaske	National Secretary, Australian Services Union	Left	(Victoria (state)) Victoria	Yes
Elected members	Senator Karen Grogan	Senator for South Australia	Left	South Australia	Yes
Elected members	Gerard Hayes	National President, Health Services Union	Right	New South Wales	Yes
Elected members	Hon. Julian Hill MP	Member of the Australian House of Representatives for Bruce	Left	(Victoria (state)) Victoria	Yes
Elected members	Graeme Kelly	General Secretary, United Services Union	Right	New South Wales	Yes
Elected members	Josh Peak	Secretary, Shop, Distributive and Allied Employees Association South Australia-Northern Territory	Right	South Australia	Yes
Elected members	Hon. Sam Rae MP	Member of the Australian House of Representatives for Hawke	Right	(Victoria (state)) Victoria	Yes
Elected members	Stacey Schinnerl	Secretary, Australian Workers' Union Queensland	Right	Queensland	Yes
Elected members	Carolyn Smith	Secretary, United Workers Union Western Australia	Left	Western Australia	Yes
Elected members	Wendy Streets	National President, Finance Sector Union	Left	Queensland	Yes
Elected members	Shannon Threlfall-Clarke	Member and former Vice-President, Australian Workers' Union Victoria	Right	(Victoria (state)) Victoria	Yes
Elected members	Dylan Wight MP	Member of the Victorian Legislative Assembly for Tarneit	Left	(Victoria (state)) Victoria	Yes

== Executive leaders ==
=== National Presidents ===
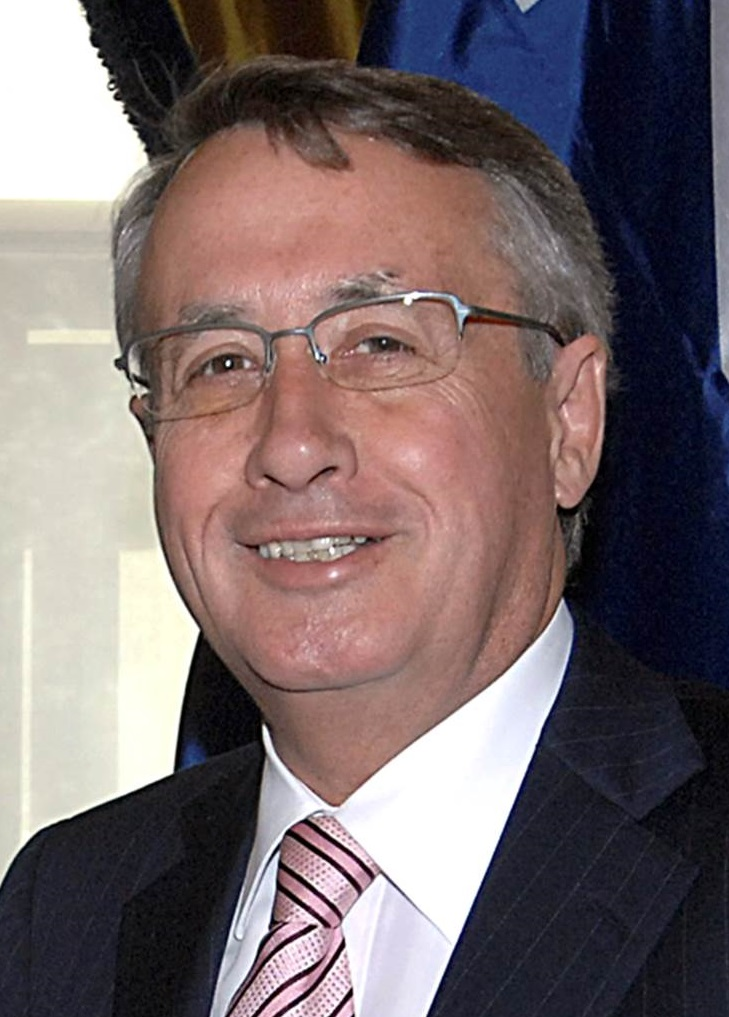
Former Treasurer and Deputy Prime Minister of Australia, Wayne Swan, National President of the Labor Party from 2018 to 2026

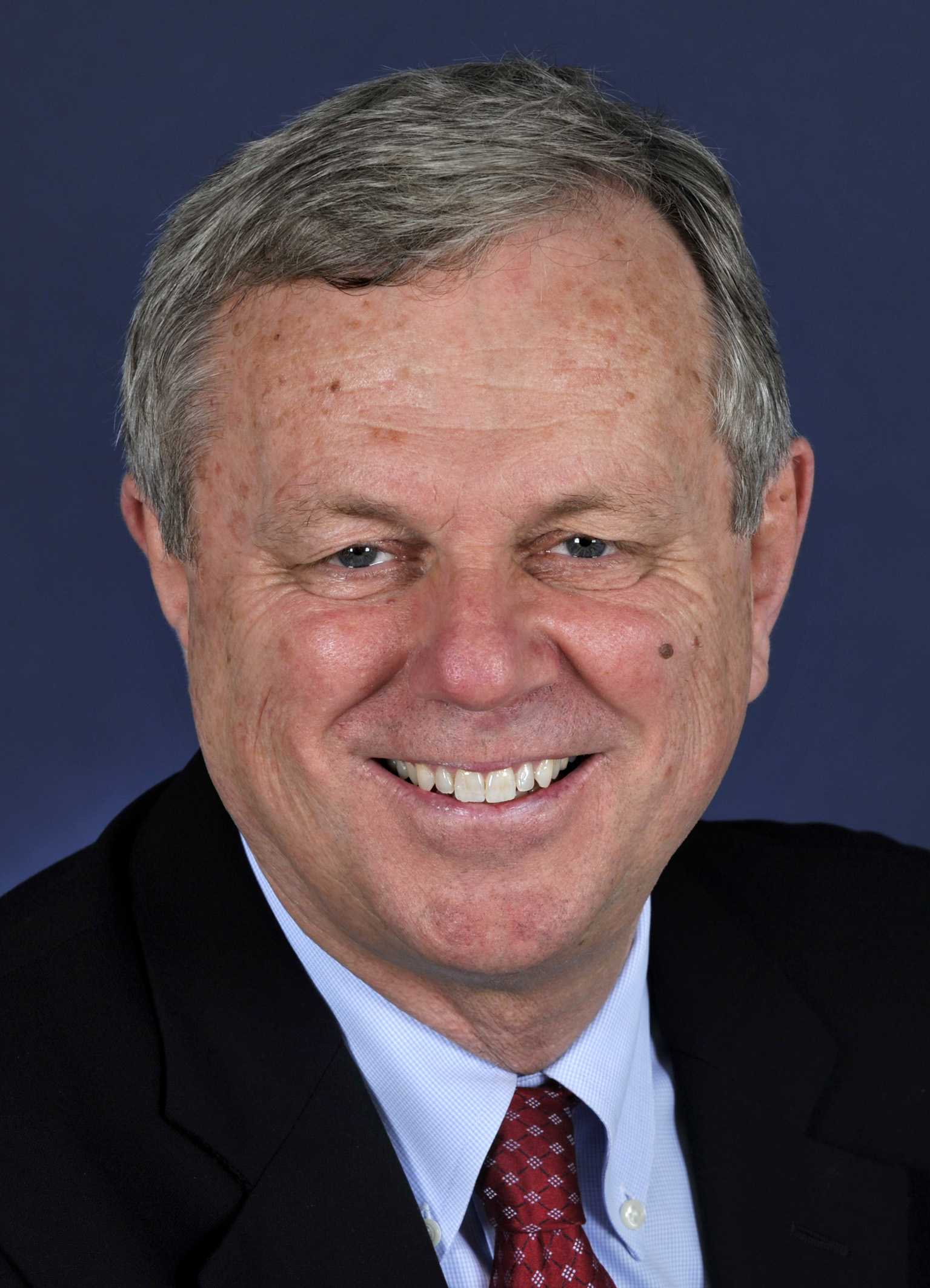
Mike Rann served concurrently as National President and Premier of South Australia, 2008

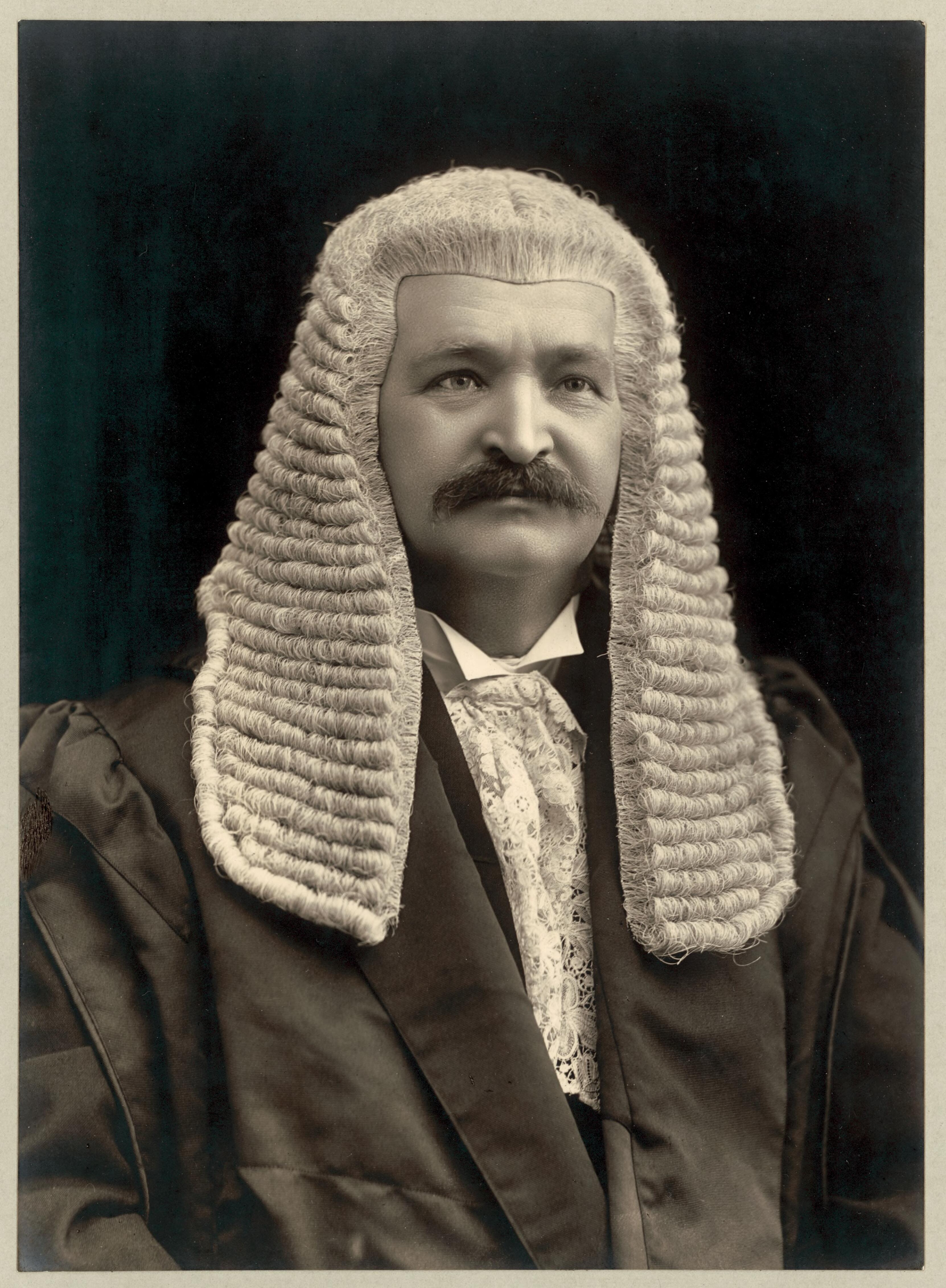
Thomas Givens served as the first National President of the Labor Party, 1915–1916. He also served as President of the Australian Senate

Name	State	Term start	Term end	Ref.
Thomas Givens	Queensland	1915	1916	
Jack Holloway	(Victoria (state)) Victoria	1916	1922	
Richard Sumner	Queensland	1922	30 April 1924	
Joseph Hannan	(Victoria (state)) Victoria	30 April 1924	1928	
James Kenneally	Western Australia	1928	1936	
Norman Makin	South Australia	1936	1938	
Clarrie Fallon	Queensland	1938	June 1944	
Fred Walsh	South Australia	14 February 1945	29 November 1946	
Abner McAlpine	New South Wales	29 November 1946	1950	
John Ferguson	New South Wales	1950	1953	
Denis Lovegrove	(Victoria (state)) Victoria	1953	1 May 1955	
Joe Chamberlain	Western Australia	1 May 1955	1961	
Vic Stout	(Victoria (state)) Victoria	February 1961	July 1961	
Bill Colbourne	New South Wales	July 1961	July 1962	
Jim Keeffe	Queensland	July 1962	August 1970	
Tom Burns	Queensland	August 1970	7 June 1973	
Bob Hawke	(Victoria (state)) Victoria	7 June 1973	2 August 1978	
Neil Batt	Tasmania	2 August 1978	8 September 1980	
Neville Wran	New South Wales	8 September 1980	3 July 1986	
Mick Young	South Australia	3 July 1986	7 April 1988	
John Bannon	South Australia	7 April 1988	25 June 1991	
Stephen Loosley	New South Wales	25 June 1991	6 June 1992	
Barry Jones	(Victoria (state)) Victoria	6 June 1992	31 July 2000	
Greg Sword	(Victoria (state)) Victoria	31 July 2000	1 January 2004	
Carmen Lawrence	Western Australia	1 January 2004	1 January 2005	
Barry Jones	(Victoria (state)) Victoria	1 January 2005	28 January 2006	
Warren Mundine	New South Wales	28 January 2006	10 January 2007	
John Faulkner	New South Wales	10 January 2007	27 February 2008	
Mike Rann	South Australia	27 February 2008	27 December 2008	
Linda Burney	New South Wales	27 December 2008	30 July 2009	
Michael Williamson	New South Wales	30 July 2009	August 2010	
Anna Bligh	Queensland	August 2010	1 July 2011	
Jenny McAllister	New South Wales	1 July 2011	17 June 2015	
Mark Butler	South Australia	17 June 2015	18 June 2018	
Wayne Swan	Queensland	18 June 2018	23 July 2026	
Kate Ellis	South Australia	23 July 2026	Incumbent	

=== National Secretaries ===
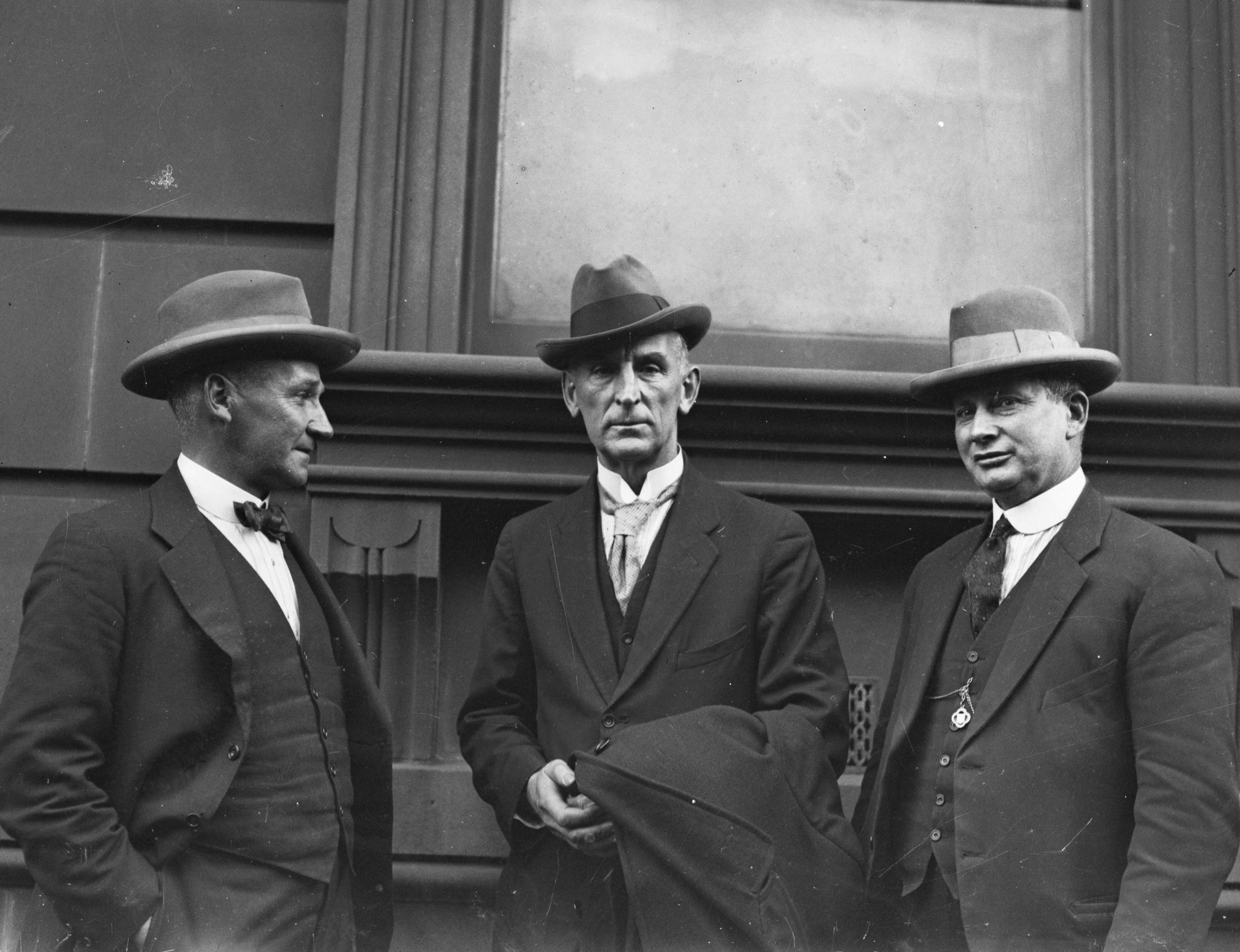
Daniel McNamara (right) in 1927. He was the longest serving National Secretary of the Labor Party, in office from 1926 to 1946

Name	State	Term start	Term end	Ref.
Arch Stewart	(Victoria (state)) Victoria	1915	1925	
Daniel McNamara	(Victoria (state)) Victoria	1926	1946	
Pat Kennelly	(Victoria (state)) Victoria	1946	1954	
Jack Schmella	Queensland	1954	1960	
Joe Chamberlain	Western Australia	1960	1963	
Cyril Wyndham	(Victoria (state)) Victoria	1963	1969	
Mick Young	South Australia	1969	1973	
David Combe	South Australia	1973	1981	
Bob McMullan	Western Australia	1981	1988	
Bob Hogg	(Victoria (state)) Victoria	1988	1993	
Gary Gray	Western Australia	1993	2000	
Geoff Walsh	(Victoria (state)) Victoria	2000	2003	
Tim Gartrell	New South Wales	2 September 2003	20 September 2008	
Karl Bitar	New South Wales	17 October 2008	16 March 2011	
George Wright	(Victoria (state)) Victoria	19 April 2011	30 August 2016	
Noah Carroll	(Victoria (state)) Victoria	26 September 2016	26 July 2019	
Paul Erickson	(Victoria (state)) Victoria	16 August 2019	Incumbent	

- Daniel McNamara was the longest serving National Secretary (known as the Federal Secretary at the time), and served concurrently as the Secretary of the Victorian branch of the party.
- Cyril Wyndham was the first full time professional Secretary. Prior to 1963 the position was part-time.
