= Paul Erickson (politician) =

Australian politician (born 1983 or 1984)

National Secretary of the Labor Party
- Incumbent
- Assumed office 16 August 2019
- Assistant: Jen Light
- National President: Wayne Swan
- Preceded by: Noah Carroll

Assistant National Secretary of the Labor Party
- In office 17 April 2014 – 16 August 2019
- National Secretary: Noah Carroll
- Preceded by: Nick Martin
- Succeeded by: Jen Light

Personal details
- Born: Paul Erickson; 1983 or 1984 (age 42–43)
- Party: Labor
- Domestic partner: Dimity Paul
- Children: 1
- Education: University of Melbourne
- Occupation: Unionist; Politician
- Website: alp.org.au

Paul Erickson is an Australian trade unionist and the national secretary of the Australian Labor Party.

== Political career ==
Erickson worked for the Australian Council of Trade Unions (ACTU) in research and data. In 2014, he took up the position as assistant national secretary of the Australian Labor Party. He has also worked in the New South Wales and Victorian state governments, advising several Labor ministers including Peter Batchelor, Richard Wynne and Carmel Tebbutt.

Following the resignation of Noah Carroll in 2019, Erickson was appointed acting national secretary and was appointed to the role permanently on 16 August 2019. Erickson is a member of the left faction, and served as convenor of the Socialist Left in Victoria in 2010.

As party secretary, Erickson was the national campaign director for Labor in both the 2022 and 2025 federal elections, achieving a victory in both, including a landslide victory in 2025. In 2024, he was publicly touted by Labor Left allies as a potential candidate for the Australian Senate to fill the vacancy created following the death of Linda White. However, he declined the opportunity. Following the 2025 election victory, he denied further speculation he intended to enter parliament soon and noted his intention to re-nominate as party secretary at the next Australian Labor Party National Conference.

Erickson was afforded the number one spot on the "10 most covertly powerful people list" for 2025 published by the Australian Financial Review.

== Personal life ==
Erickson grew up in the state of Victoria. He holds a bachelor's degree in arts and economics. It was there he became involved in student politics, and was elected President of the University of Melbourne in 2003. He is the younger brother of three time Olympian and Commonwealth Games medalist, Chris Erickson. In May 2025, shortly before that year's Federal Election, Erickson and his partner welcomed their first child, Elisabeth.

Party political offices
Preceded by Noah Carroll	National Secretary of the Australian Labor Party; 2019–present	Incumbent
