= Faceless men =

Term in Australian politics

Faceless men is a term in Australian politics generally used to refer to political party members who exert political influence over elected representatives of their party. Although some sources attribute its origin to 1963, it appears the term was used as early as 1957 to characterize the Australian Labor Party, which Prime Minister Robert Menzies successfully leveraged as an election tactic to discredit Labor. It has since been used occasionally against different political parties. However, its use may be inconsistent, with the influence of members being depicted negatively for some parties but not for others.

== Origin ==
Some sources propose that the term was first used in 1963 by Alan Reid, a journalist working for Sir Frank Packer's conservative Sydney Daily Telegraph, to refer to the 36 members of the Australian Labor Party's Federal Conference, which at that time decided elements of the party's election policy. In the run-up to the campaign for the 1963 federal election, Reid commissioned a photograph of Labor Leader Arthur Calwell and his Deputy Leader Gough Whitlam standing outside the Kingston Hotel in Canberra, where the Conference was meeting, waiting to be told on what policy they were to fight the election. Neither Calwell nor Whitlam were delegates to the Conference, which then consisted of six delegates from each of the six states. Reid commented that the ALP was ruled by "36 faceless men". In fact, there was a woman, Phyllis Benjamin of Tasmania, among the delegates at the Conference. Although sources attribute Alan Reid for coining the term, it appears it was used as early as 1957 to refer to the Labor Party.

The line was used effectively by the Liberal Party and its leader, Prime Minister Robert Menzies. The Liberal Party produced a leaflet headed: "Mr Calwell and the Faceless Men". The leaflet described Conference delegates as "36 unknown men, not elected to Parliament nor responsible to the people." This tactic helped Menzies win the election with an increased majority, and led directly to Whitlam's campaign to reform the Labor Party's structure when he succeeded Calwell as party leader in 1967.

The term "faceless men" henceforth became a part of Australia's political lexicon, often used in a pejorative sense when referencing the Labor Party.

== Other uses since 2010 ==
=== Referring to the Australian Labor Party ===
The term was revived in 2010 when a group of Labor factional leaders, including Bill Shorten, David Feeney, Mark Arbib and Don Farrell, with the support of the union leader Paul Howes, arranged for the Labor Prime Minister Kevin Rudd to be removed as party leader and replaced by deputy leader Julia Gillard. Howes later published a book called Confessions of a Faceless Man. The expression was also used to refer to the figures in the NSW branch of the Labor Party, such as Karl Bitar and Arbib who brought about the successive removals of Morris Iemma and Nathan Rees as Premier of New South Wales.

The term returned to prominence in February 2012, when Rudd resigned as Minister for Foreign Affairs and announced he would challenge Gillard in an attempt to regain the Labor leadership. Rudd stated:

"In recent days, Minister Crean and a number of other faceless men have publicly attacked my integrity and therefore my fitness to serve as a minister in the government.... I deeply believe that if the Australian Labor Party, a party of which I have been a proud member for more than 30 years, is to have the best future for our nation, then it must change fundamentally its culture and to end the power of faceless men. Australia must be governed by the people, not by the factions.

— Kevin Rudd: Transcript of resignation speech, 2012.

Rudd later stated that "..reform of the Labor Party itself, so that our party is equipped for the tasks of the 21st century. And that means a party which is not governed by the faceless men." A prominent Rudd supporter, Senator Doug Cameron, said that "Labor's faceless men" had forced Rudd's resignation as Foreign Minister. In response, Labor MP Michael Danby, a Gillard supporter, said that Rudd had his own "faceless men", notably the lobbyist Bruce Hawker. Hawker replied: "I don't want to be a faceless man. I actually want to address issues." Opposition leader at the time, Tony Abbott, attempted to use Rudd's comments to highlight instability in Labor and its preference deals with The Greens.

James Mahoney, a senior lecturer in public relations at the University of Canberra, wrote of this revival of the "faceless men" epithet:

"The greatest curiosity of the Labor leadership brawl is Kevin Rudd's 'faceless men' line, which seems to refer to prominent parliamentary colleagues with very recognisable faces. But there is method in the way he is using it. When Robert Menzies described the then Labor national executive as 'faceless men' he was stating the obvious: the 36 people who ran the party were all men who were barely known publicly, and who took decisions in secret... In a strategic communication sense, Kevin Rudd’s use of 'faceless men' in recent days is a tactical message designed to support his long-standing argument against the faction leaders who now run the party. He is suggesting that faction leaders do their work well out of public view, including organising numbers for pre-selections, and leadership challenges."

The term continued to be used throughout the duration of the Rudd – Gillard – Rudd governments.

In late 2017 it was reported that four unnamed union officials were faceless men who would control the Victorian branch of the Labor Party – and through it, influence on the party's national executive.

=== Referring to the Greens ===
During 2014 and 2016 respectively, motions were put to the State Delegate Councils of Greens New South Wales and Tasmanian Greens to empower non-parliamentary elected representatives, or "faceless men and women", to direct NSW Greens MLCs and MPs and Tasmanian MPs how to vote when their respective partyrooms were unable reach consensus.

=== Referring to the Liberal Party of Australia ===
When referring to the Liberal Party, the members and benefactors of the Institute of Public Affairs have been referred to as faceless men; as has former NSW Liberal MP and lobbyist, Michael Photios; and various members of the Abbott government and Ministry.
