= Abner McAlpine =

Australian Labor Party president

Abe McAlpine

National President of the Labor Party
- In office 1946–1950
- Leader: Ben Chifley
- Preceded by: Fred Walsh
- Succeeded by: John Ferguson

President of the New South Wales Labor Party
- In office 1940–1943
- Leader: William McKell
- Preceded by: Albert Willis
- Succeeded by: Francis Kelly

President of the Labor Council of New South Wales
- In office 1932–1935
- Secretary: Jock Garden; Robert Arthur King

Personal details
- Born: 26 February 1891 Sydney, Colony of New South Wales
- Died: 22 January 1958 (aged 66) Concord, New South Wales, Australia
- Party: Labor
- Spouses: Eileen Barber (m. 1914; div. 1924); Zellmira Veronica Foldi (m. 1925)
- Children: 2
- Occupation: Union official Public servant

Abner Strephon "Abe" McAlpine (26 February 1891 – 22 January 1958) was an Australian trade unionist and political party official who served as the National President of the Australian Labor Party from 1946 to 1950 and earlier President of the New South Wales Labor Party from 1940 to 1943.

== Career ==
Prior to serving as national president, McAlpine was a member and delegate for the Amalgamated Engineering Union, President of the Labor Council of New South Wales from 1932 to 1935, and assistant secretary of the Labor Council from 1936 to 1941.

He later served as a member of the management committee for union-backed radio station 2KY, a member of the Australian Shipbuilding Board and served on the New South Wales Broadcasting Advisory Committee, the post-war Commonwealth Immigration Advisory Council and the Factory Welfare Board of New South Wales.

McAlpine narrowly missed out on appointment to a vacancy for the New South Wales Legislative Council in 1940, losing to the Australian Labor Party (Non-Communist) nominee Charles Brill Bridges.

== See also ==
- Australian Labor Party National Executive
- Chifley government
- Lang Labor
- Australian Labor Party split of 1931
