= Albert Hinchcliffe =

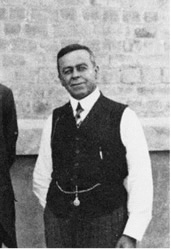

Member of the Queensland Legislative Council
- In office 1 May 1904 – 23 March 1922

Personal details
- Born: Albert Hinchcliffe; 14 February 1860 Ashton-under-Lyne, Lancashire, England
- Died: 4 January 1935 (aged 74) Sydney, Australia
- Party: Labour Party
- Spouse(s): Mary Ann Beer(m. 1883, d. 1911), Frances May Hickman (m. 1913, d. 1956)
- Occupation: Printer, trade union organiser

Albert Hinchcliffe (14 February 1860 – 4 January 1935) was a trade union organizer and member of the Queensland Legislative Council.

== Early life ==
Hinchcliffe was born at Ashton-under-Lyne, Lancashire to Ezra Hinchcliffe, a cotton warehouse worker, and his wife, Alice (née Gatside). His family migrated to Australia in 1864 and after his father died Hinchcliffe and his mother settled in Toowoomba, Queensland. He went to Toowoomba State School, but left early and before he was eight years old he was working at Clifton station.

In 1872 Hinchcliffe was apprenticed to a compositor at the Darling Downs Gazette before moving to Brisbane to work as a printer for the Brisbane Courier and after 1885, the Telegraph. Hinchcliffe was a member of the Queensland Typographical Association and when it affiliated with the Brisbane Trades and Labour Council he was the association's delegate. In 1887, Hinchcliffe became secretary of the T.L.C. and used his position to campaign for direct parliamentary representation of the labour movement.

== Political career ==
In the 1888 colonial election, Hinchcliffe stood for the seat of Toombul as a representative of the labour interests but was soundly defeated by Michael Gannon. For this act he was dismissed from his job by the Telegraph. In 1893, he contested the seat of Fortitude Valley, this time losing to John McMaster.

His final attempt at winning a seat in the Assembly came in 1900 when he was up against Thomas Glassey in a by-election for the seat of Bundaberg, which he once again lost. He finally entered parliament in 1904, being appointed to the Legislative Council and remained there until 1922 when the council was abolished.

== Personal life ==
Hinchcliffe married Mary Ann Beer in July 1883 at Toowoomba and together had one son. In 1913, two years after the death of Mary, he married Frances May Hickman in Sydney and they also had one son.

He died in Sydney in 1935 and was cremated at the Rookwood Crematorium.
