= Clarrie Fallon =

Australian trade unionist (1890–1950)

Personal details
- Born: c. 1890 Rockwood, Queensland, Australia
- Died: 11 January 1950 (aged 59–60) North Sydney, New South Wales, Australia
- Spouse: Lillian Sansum (m. 1913)
- Occupation: Trade unionist

Clarence George Fallon (c. 1890 – 11 January 1950) was an Australian trade unionist. He served as general secretary of the Australian Workers' Union (AWU) from 1941 to 1943. He was also president of the Australian Labor Party National Executive from 1938 to 1944.

Fallon died on 11 January 1950 at the Mater Hospital in North Sydney, New South Wales, having suffered a cerebral haemorrhage while attending an AWU Federal Council meeting. Fallon House in Bundaberg, Queensland, was named in his honour.

Trade union offices
Preceded by Ted Grayndler	General Secretary of the Australian Workers' Union; 1941–1944	Succeeded by Beecher Hay
