= Noah Carroll =

Australian politician

National Secretary of the Labor Party
- In office 26 September 2016 – 26 July 2019
- Preceded by: George Wright
- Succeeded by: Paul Erickson

Personal details
- Party: Labor
- Spouse: Sarah Carroll
- Children: Isabella Carroll, Harrison Carroll

Noah Carroll is an Australian politician who was the 11th National Secretary of the Australian Labor Party. He is a member of the party's right faction.

== Political career ==
Carroll joined Labor at the age of 21 while living in Mount Macedon in rural Victoria.

He then served as Councillor for the Shire of Macedon Ranges. He has also previously been employed as a Ministerial Advisor to the Victorian Treasurer, Adviser to the Minister for Finance and Consumer Affairs and as an Adviser to the Minister for Gaming and Consumer Affairs.

Carroll subsequently worked as the Assistant State Secretary of Victorian Labor from 2009 to 2011 and then as State Secretary from 2011 to 2016. As State Secretary, he oversaw the 2014 state campaign that elected the Andrews Government in Victoria after just one term in opposition. He is known for his bluntness, strategic mind and is considered a very close confidant of Labor Leader Bill Shorten and previously worked for Senators Stephen Conroy and Robert Ray.

He completed Harvard Business School's general management programme in 2015.

He is also a graduate of the University of Melbourne with a Bachelor of Arts degree and from Monash University with a Master of Management (International Business).

In 2013, he was awarded the ten-year service medal for service to the Country Fire Authority.

Caroll resigned from the position of National Secretary in July 2019 following Labor's defeat at the 2019 Australian federal election. He now works at KPMG in the management consultant division.

== Personal life ==
Caroll has a wife, Sarah, and has two children, daughter, Isabella and son, Harrison.

Party political offices
Preceded by George Wright	National Secretary of the Australian Labor Party; 2016–2019	Succeeded by Paul Erickson
