= George Wright (trade unionist) =

Australian trade unionist and politician

George Wright AO

National Secretary of the Australian Labor Party
- In office 19 April 2011 – 30 August 2016
- Preceded by: Karl Bitar
- Succeeded by: Noah Carroll

Personal details
- Born: George Bernard Wright
- Party: Labor
- Education: University of Melbourne
- Occupation: Trade unionist

George Bernard Wright AO is an Australian trade unionist who served as the 10th National Secretary of the Australian Labor Party. He currently works in the private sector.

== Political career ==
Wright has worked at the Finance Sector Union, the Liquor Hospitality and Miscellaneous Workers Unions and held the position of Director of Policy and Communications at the Australian Council of Trade Unions. As Director of Policy and Communications, he led the successful Your Rights At Work campaign against John Howard's WorkChoices laws.

He has also worked as Communications Director at the National Australia Bank after leaving his position as press secretary for Kevin Rudd in 2008.

As National Secretary of the Australian Labor Party, Wright ran the campaign for the Australian Labor Party in the 2013 and 2016 federal elections. In September 2016, he resigned as National Secretary to take up a senior corporate relations role at BHP.

He is not tied to any faction inside the Labor Party.

In the 2020 Australia Day Honours Wright was appointed an Officer of the Order of Australia (AO) for "distinguished service to parliament and politics as National Secretary of the Australian Labor Party, and to business".

== Personal life ==
He has a Bachelor of Arts (Honours) from the University of Melbourne and is married with a daughter in high school. Wright grew up in outer suburban Melbourne and has been a member of the Labor Party throughout his adult life.

Party political offices
Preceded by Karl Bitar	National Secretary of the Australian Labor Party; 2011–2016	Succeeded by Noah Carroll
