= Archibald Stewart (trade unionist) =

Australian trade unionist (1867–1925)

Arch Stewart

1st National Secretary of the Labor Party
- In office 1915–1925
- Leader: Billy Hughes; Frank Tudor; Matthew Charlton
- Succeeded by: Daniel McNamara

Secretary of the Victorian Labor Party
- In office 1911–1915
- Leader: George Prendergast; George Elmslie

Personal details
- Born: 30 December 1867 Sebastopol, Colony of Victoria
- Died: 29 May 1925 (aged 57) Sandringham, Victoria; Australia
- Resting place: Preston, Victoria
- Party: Australian Labor Party
- Spouse: Mary Edwards
- Occupation: Union official

Archibald Stewart (30 December 1867 – 29 May 1925) was an Australian trade unionist and Australian Labor Party official who served as the National Secretary of the Labor Party from 1915 to 1925.

Stewart was born at Sebastopol to Scottish-born parents: miner John Stewart and Anne, née Erskine. His father worked as caretaker of the botanical gardens in Creswick and he took numerous jobs in his youth. Active in the early labour movement, he struggled to find permanent employment after being placed on an employers' blacklist. On 25 June 1891 he married Mary Edwards at Fitzroy. He was a member of the Australian Workers' Union and was its delegate on the Ballarat Trades and Labor Council until 1910. He helped found the Ballarat branch of the Labor Party in 1902 and was its secretary from 1905 to 1906; he was involved in James Scullin's ultimately unsuccessful attempt to unseat Alfred Deakin at the 1906 federal election.

In 1908 Stewart ran for the Victorian Legislative Assembly, standing unsuccessfully as the Labor candidate for Ballarat East. He was also narrowly defeated standing in 1910 and 1913 for the federal seat of Grampians. After the 1910 election he moved to Melbourne and was elected senior vice-president of the Political Labor Council, later taking on the secretaryship in 1911. In 1914 he was considered one of the "powers behind the throne" of Andrew Fisher's federal administration, and he was appointed the first secretary of the ALP's federal executive in 1915, serving until 1925. A staunch anti-conscriptionist, he organised opposition to Billy Hughes' conscription referendums in 1916–17 and avoided a second split over the socialist objective in 1919–21. In 1925 he died at his home in Sandringham of tuberculosis.

A memorial tablet was unveiled at Stewart's grave in December 1926 by the then president of the Victorian branch of the ALP, Charlie Crofts.

Stewart is buried at Coburg Cemetery, Preston, Victoria. His grave is included in a self-guided heritage walk at the cemetery and information about his life is available on a sign posted at his graveside.
