= 2011 Australian Labor Party National Conference =

Australian political party conference

The 2011 Australian Labor Party National Conference was the 46th triennial National Conference of the Australian Labor Party. It was held on 3 December 2011 at the Sydney Convention and Exhibition Centre at Darling Harbour, New South Wales.

== Events ==
=== Same sex marriage ===
On 3 December 2011, the party voted in favour of recognising same-sex marriage in Australia. Party leader and Prime Minister Julia Gillard opposed the legalisation of same-sex marriage, but endorsed bringing the issue to a vote. Previously, over 140,000 Australian citizens signed a petition to Gillard urging her to reconsider her opposition. At the same time, openly lesbian Finance Minister Senator Penny Wong vocally endorsed same-sex marriage becoming Labor policy.

The party, however, also formally endorsed a motion, which Gillard supported, to allow Labor members of parliament a conscience vote on the issue, on a vote of 208 to 184.

The party's endorsement of same-sex marriage was also supported outside of Australia. Boris Dittrich, current LGBTI Program Director for Human Rights Watch and former member of the Tweede Kamer in the Netherlands (Dittrich voted in favour of the Netherlands becoming the first modern nation to legalise same-sex marriage in 2001), sent an open letter to the Labor Party urging delegates to endorse same-sex marriage.

On 19 September 2012, a private members' bill by Labor MP Stephen Jones to legislate same-sex marriage was defeated 98–42 in the Australian House of Representatives. 26 of the 73 Labor MPs voted against the measure. Legalisation would not come until January 2018, after the Australian Marriage Law Postal Survey.

==== Reactions ====
The Union for Progressive Judaism, the largest denomination of Jewish rabbis in Australia, welcomed the conference vote.
