= Bob Hogg =

Australian politician

Robert (Bob) Duncan Hogg AO is an Australian Labor Party (ALP) identity, and former ALP National Secretary.

== Career ==
- 1976–78: Secretary of the Victorian Branch of the ALP.
- 1983–86: Senior adviser to then Australian Prime Minister, Bob Hawke
- 1986–87: Consultant to the Premier of Victoria
- 1988–93: Australian Labor Party National Secretary
- 1993–98: Deputy Chairman of the Singleton Group
- 1998– : Independent consultant – Issues Management; Director of Australian Health International; Director of Snowy Hydro Corporation; columnist Australian Financial Review.

As a columnist, Bob Hogg has sometimes expressed views at variance with those of the ALP; during the 1999 debate on a GST he criticised those opposing the tax (including independent Brian Harradine) on the grounds that such a tax would ensure funding for policies traditionally advocated by Labor, such as state schools and hospitals. As ALP Secretary, Hogg ran anti-GST ads for the 1993 election campaign.

== Personal life ==
Hogg was married to Caroline Hogg (née Kluht) from 1967 to 1996, with whom he had two children. For 17 years, Caroline Hogg held a seat in the Victorian Legislative Council, and held various state ministries.

He currently lives in the Sydney suburb of Epping with his partner, Maxine McKew, an Australian journalist and the former Labor member for the Division of Bennelong.

== Conflict of interest ==
In 1991, Hogg was placed on a A$1000 six-month good-behaviour bond for failing as the National Secretary to declare donations to the Australian Labor Party in the lead up to the 1990 election. The total of the donations was reported as $143,000 consisting of multiple amounts each of a value less than $1000.

== Honours ==
Hogg was appointed an Officer of the Order of Australia in 1995.

He received a Centenary Medal for "significant contribution to Australian politics" in 2001.

Party political offices
Preceded by Bob McMullan	National Secretary of the Australian Labor Party; 1988–1993	Succeeded by Gary Gray
