= Jim Keeffe =

Australian politician (1919–1988)

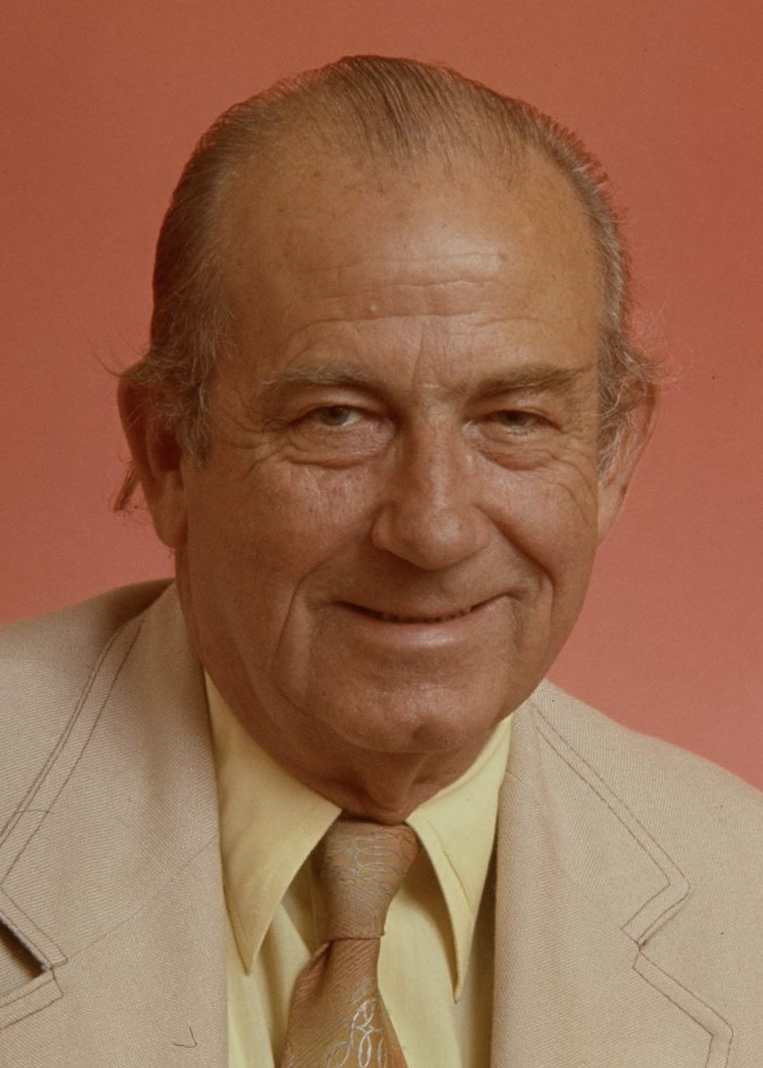
- Keeffe in 1974

National President of the Labor Party
- In office July 1962 – August 1970
- Preceded by: James Stout
- Succeeded by: Tom Burns

Senator for Queensland
- In office 1 July 1965 – 4 February 1983

Personal details
- Born: 20 August 1919 Atherton, Queensland, Australia
- Died: 15 May 1988 (aged 68) Townsville, Queensland, Australia
- Party: Australian Labor Party
- Occupation: Insurance salesman

James Bernard Keeffe (20 August 1919 – 15 May 1988) was an Australian politician who served in the Australian Senate as a Labor Senator for Queensland.

== Early life ==
Born in Atherton, Queensland, he was educated at state schools before becoming a farm labourer and forestry worker. After serving in the military 1942–1945, he became an insurance and real-estate salesman.

He became state secretary of the Coopers' Union, before serving as secretary of the Queensland Labor Party between 1960 and 1965, and as federal president from 1962 to 1970.

== Senator ==
In 1964, he was elected to the Australian Senate as a Labor Senator for Queensland, taking his seat in 1965. He remained a Senator until his retirement in 1983.

In 1978, Keeffe ran a petition supporting the wishes of the Aboriginal people on Palm Island to retain their Aboriginal council. However the council was sacked by Joh Bjelke-Petersen's government in July 1978. This followed moves by the Queensland Government to hand over control of Palm Island to Townsville Council. The government ran a counter-petition, which, it was reported, carried forgeries and duplication of names; both petitions contained many of the same people's signatures.

== Later life and death ==
In May 1988, Keeffe visited Canberra for the opening of the New Parliament House. On 15 May, he was found dead by his son when his returning train pulled into the station in Townsville.
