= Karl Bitar =

Australian politician

National Secretary of the Australian Labor Party
- In office 17 October 2008 – 8 April 2011
- Preceded by: Tim Gartrell
- Succeeded by: George Wright

Personal details
- Party: Labor

Karl Bitar is an Australian politician who was the ninth National Secretary of the Australian Labor Party and former General Secretary of NSW Labor. He now works as an executive for Crown Limited.

== Political career ==
Between 1999 and 2004, Bitar worked as an organiser for NSW Labor.

He was then elevated to Assistant General Secretary of NSW Labor in 2004 before becoming General Secretary in 2007. In his role as General Secretary, Bitar acted as NSW Campaign Director at the 2007 federal election.

Bitar then succeeded Tim Gartrell as National Secretary of the Australian Labor Party in 2008. As National Secretary, he oversaw the 2010 Australian federal election campaign which left Labor in minority government. Several sources at the time credited Bitar for the poor result. However, Bitar largely cited other factors, including expectations of a Labor win, the media's failure to properly scrutinise Tony Abbott, the leaks and Mark Latham, as issues that led to the result. The campaign review found his specific efforts in NSW largely helped Labor gain victory. Bitar resigned as National Secretary in 2011.

He is a member of the right faction.

== Personal life ==
Bitar is of Lebanese descent and is a Melkite Catholic.

Party political offices
| Preceded by Mark Arbib | General Secretary of the Australian Labor Party (NSW Branch); 2007–2008 | Succeeded by Matt Thistlethwaite |
| Preceded by Tim Gartrell | National Secretary of the Australian Labor Party; 2008–2011 | Succeeded by George Wright |
