= Joe Chamberlain (Australian politician) =

Australian politician (1900–1984)

Francis Edward "Joe" Chamberlain (13 May 1900 – 20 October 1984) was a Western Australian politician who was Australian Labor Party State Secretary in Western Australia.

He also became a Federal Labor Party president and secretary.
