= Electoral results for the district of Kalkallo =

Victoria, Australia, district election results

This is a list of electoral results for the Electoral district of Kalkallo in Victorian state elections.

== Members for Kalkallo ==
Member	Party	Term
Ros Spence	Labor	2022–present

== Election results ==
=== Elections in the 2020s ===
2022 Victorian state election: Kalkallo
Party	Candidate	Votes	%	±%
Labor	Ros Spence	21,531	53.9	−5.7
Liberal	Bikram Singh	9,154	22.9	−2.4
Family First	Das Sayer	2,457	6.1	+6.1
Greens	Muhammad Nisar Ul Murtaza	2,116	5.3	−0.6
Victorian Socialists	Sergio Monsalve Tobon	1,938	4.8	+2.4
Animal Justice	Frances Lowe	1,466	3.7	+3.7
Independent	Jimmy George Parel	610	1.5	+1.5
New Democrats	Smiley Sandhu	409	1.0	+1.0
Independent	Callum John French	299	0.8	+0.8
Total formal votes		39,970	92.0	–0.6
Informal votes		3,504	8.0	+0.6
Turnout		43,474	83.3	+7.2
Two-party-preferred result
Labor	Ros Spence	26,561	66.5	−4.4
Liberal	Bikram Singh	13,409	33.5	+4.4
Labor hold		Swing	−4.4	
