= 2026 Australian Labor Party National Conference =

Triennial political party conference

- Date: July 23–25, 2026
- Venue: Adelaide Convention Centre
- Location: Adelaide, South Australia
- Type: Party conference
- Theme: Delivering Real Change
- Organised by: ALP National Executive
- Participants: 2,000+ (Note: Including 397 delegates)
- Website: www.laborconference.org.au

The 2026 Australian Labor Party National Conference was the 50th triennial political party conference of the Australian Labor Party. It took place in Adelaide, South Australia from 23 to 25 July 2026.

== Background ==
=== Political situation ===
The 50th National Conference occurred amidst what some pundits have claimed is a "realignment" of right-wing politics in Australia. Pauline Hanson and her party One Nation have experienced a significant surge in national opinion polls, with several showing the party winning the two-party-preferred vote. Although this has come mostly at the expense of the opposition Liberal-National Coalition, some polls had One Nation matching the Labor party's primary vote or even winning (within the margin of error). One Nation's victory in the 2026 Farrer by-election, their first federal election victory in a lower house seat, also caused concern among many across the political spectrum. Former Labor strategist Kos Samaras claimed that the surge in support for a third party meant the classic two-party system of Australian politics had effectively been dismantled.

Labor's 2026 budget included several key changes to capital gains tax and negative gearing, and reactions to the policy announcements had been mixed. Several groups, including One Nation, had labelled the government "liars" for making changes they had not signalled they would make prior to the 2025 election.

=== Draft platform ===
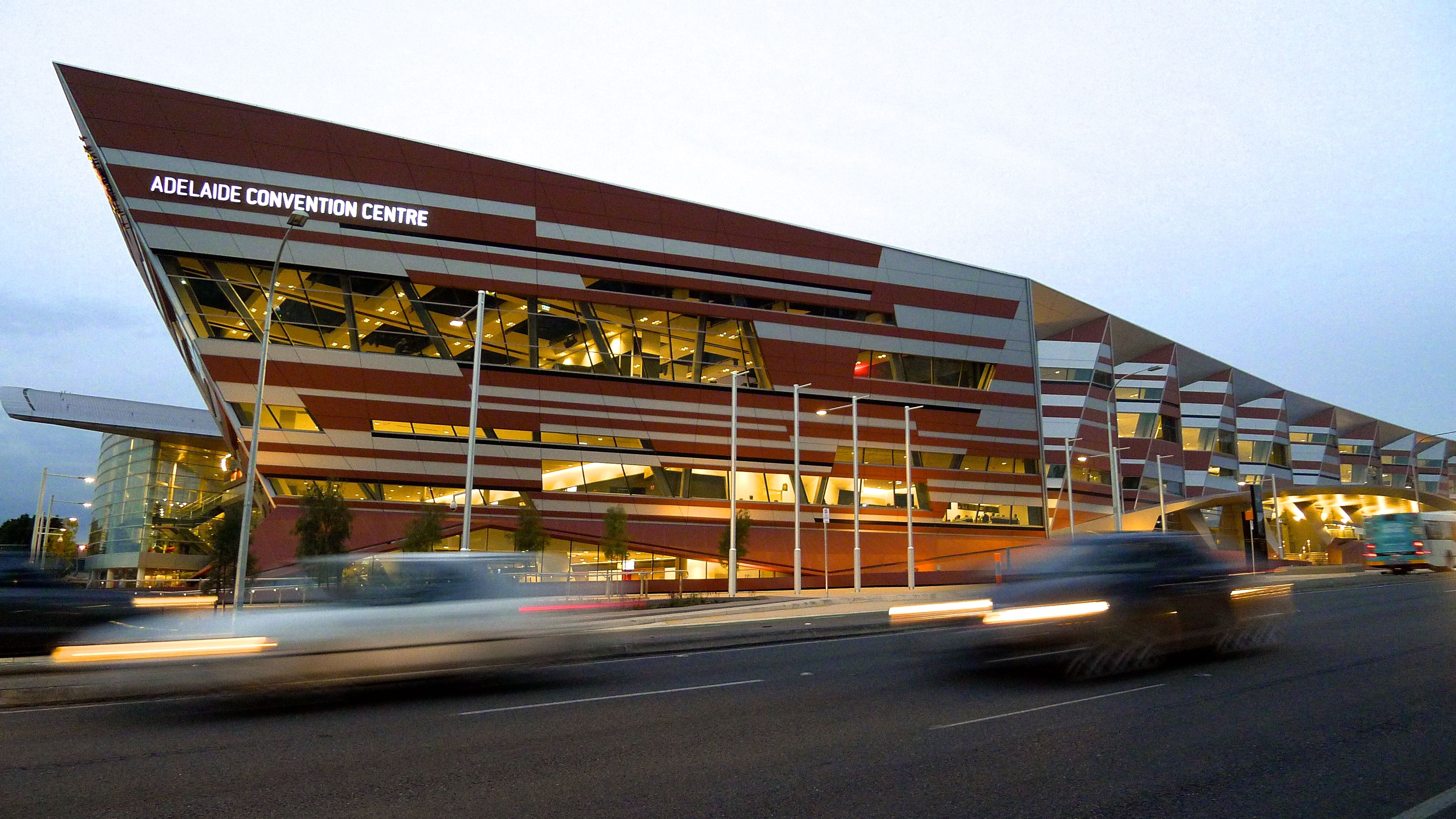
The 50th National Conference will be held at the Adelaide Convention Centre

In the lead up to each national conference, the party's platform is drafted by the National Policy Forum, a 65-member group which includes senior party leadership, elected grassroots party members, nominated members of affiliated trade unions and members of the federal caucus. The group is co-chaired by the party leader and national president.

The initial draft of the 2026 platform was viewed by members of the media in April 2026. Labor's longstanding opposition to mandatory jail terms was seemingly omitted from the first draft, and it included "assertive" language on Australia's relationship with China. The draft also articulated Labor's aim to position Australia as an “active middle power” to tackle increasingly fraught geopolitical situations. The leaked draft also no longer included an 82% renewable energy target. An updated version of the draft platform was also revealed to commit the party to cracking down on inducements for online gambling. Other policies expected to be debated at conference include artificial intelligence in the workplace, fuel rebates for mining companies, interest rates and Israel and Palestine. There was speculation a week before the conference that the policy platform will be amended to include legislating a tax on gas exports.

Several unaffiliated interest groups made public submissions to the policy forum following the release of the draft platform, including Universities Australia and the Multicultural Youth Advocacy Network.

=== Retirement of Wayne Swan ===
Former federal treasurer and deputy prime minister Wayne Swan had served as National President of the Labor Party since his formal election at the 48th national conference in 2018 and re-election at the 49th national conference in 2023. In October 2025, Swan announced he would not compete for the presidency again, effectively retiring from politics after more than 30 years. In his announcement, Swan noted Labor's two consecutive election victories under his presidency as a source of pride, but warned his successor increasing membership must remain an urgent priority for the party.

Former federal minister Kate Ellis was chosen as the replacement to Swan, in a factional deal that included national secretary Paul Erickson retaining his position unchallenged. Her presidency was formally ratified with a vote at the 50th conference.

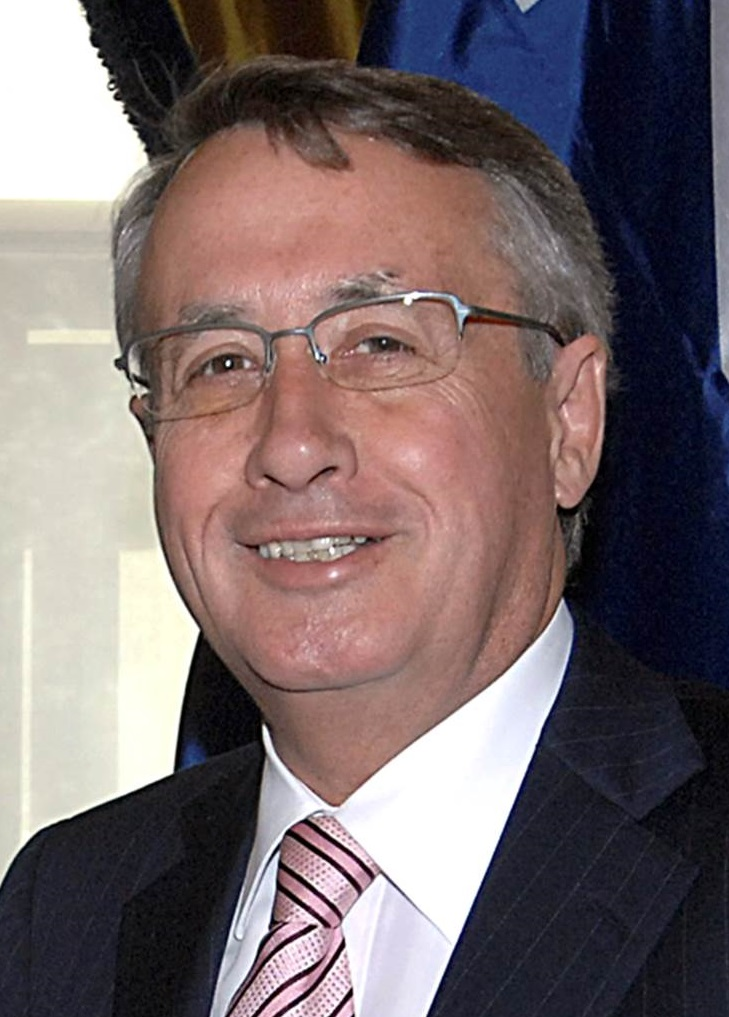
Outgoing national president, Wayne Swan

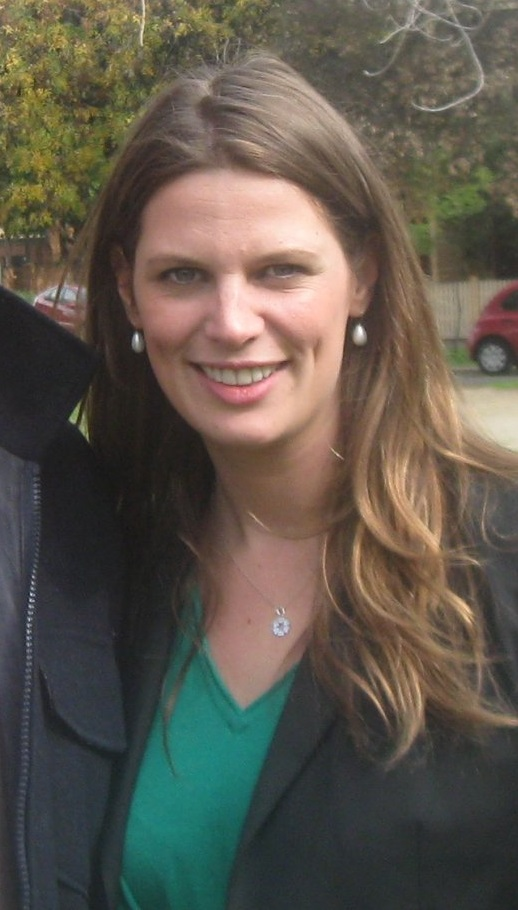
Incoming national president, Kate Ellis

== Agenda ==
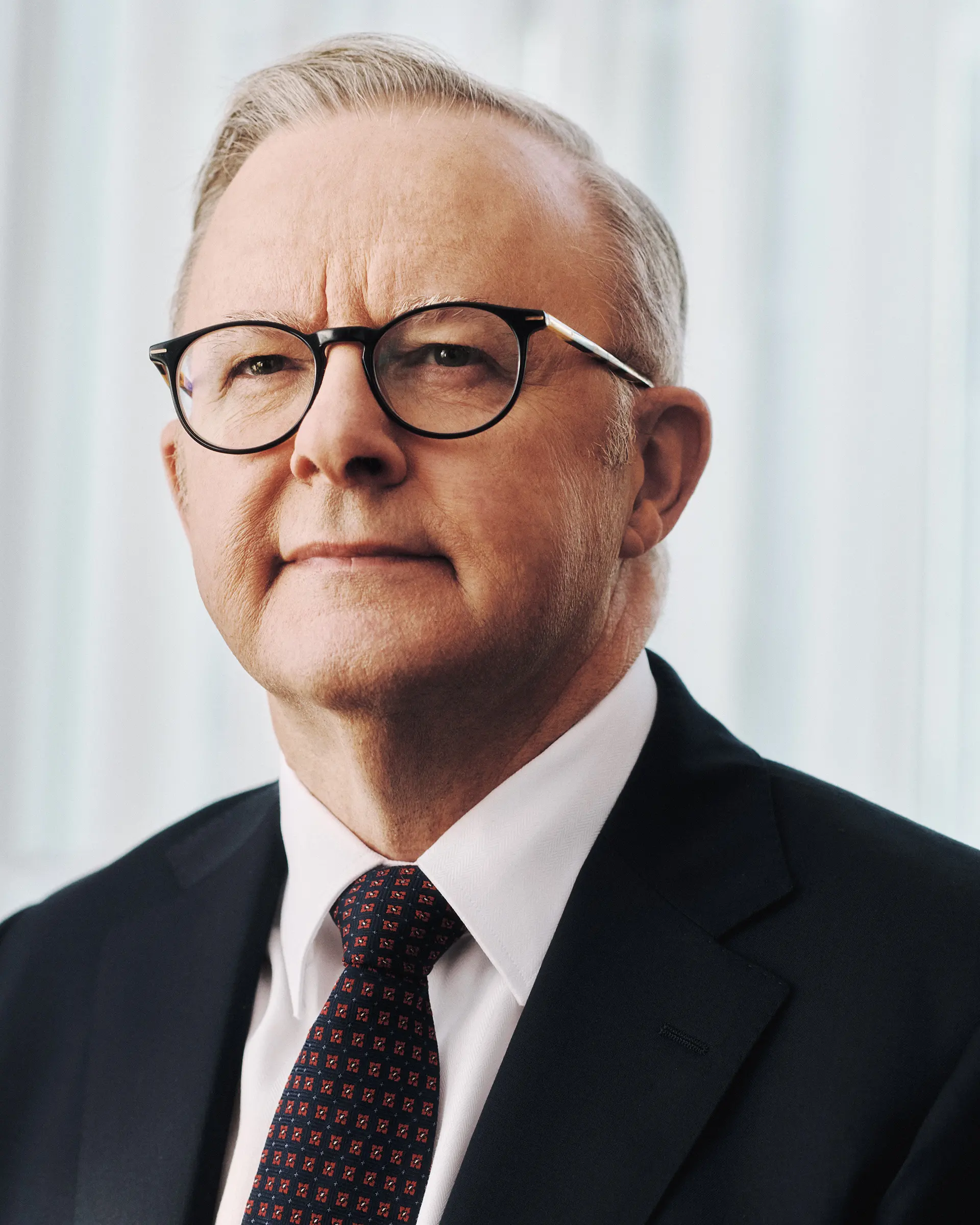
Anthony Albanese addressed the conference on Day 1

=== Day 1 ===
- Conference opening with an address by Prime Minister Anthony Albanese
- Platform Chapter 1 - An Economy That Works for Everyone
- Platform Chapter 3 - Safeguarding Our Climate and Environment and Powering Australia's Future

=== Day 2 ===
- Platform Chapter 4 - A Strong and Healthy Society
- Platform Chapter 5 - Bringing People Together
- Platform Chapter 2 - Opening the Doors of Opportunity
- ALP Constitution & Organisational Policies

=== Day 3 ===
- Platform Chapter 7 - Australia's Place in a Changing World
- Platform Chapter 6 - Strengthening Australian Democracy

== Delegates ==
=== Size of delegations ===
The ALP National Constitution, adopted in 2023 by the 49th National Conference, determined the total number of delegates for the 50th National Conference as:

ALP Conference Delegate Allocations
New South Wales	Victoria	Queensland	Western Australia	South Australia	Tasmania	Australian Capital Territory	Northern Territory	Federal Caucus	Party Leadership	Young Labor
105	89	73	45	33	23	9	7	6	4	3

== Gallery ==
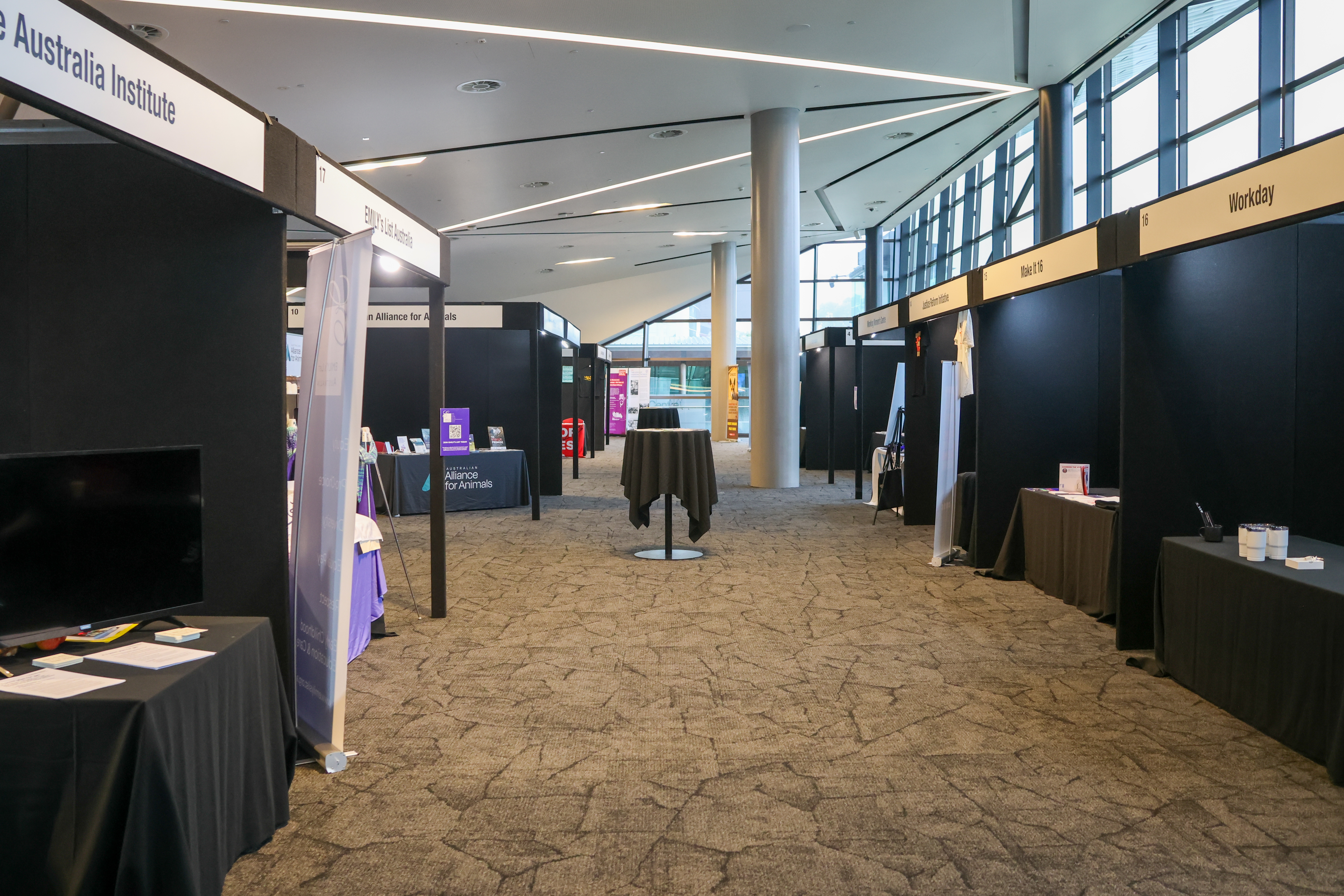

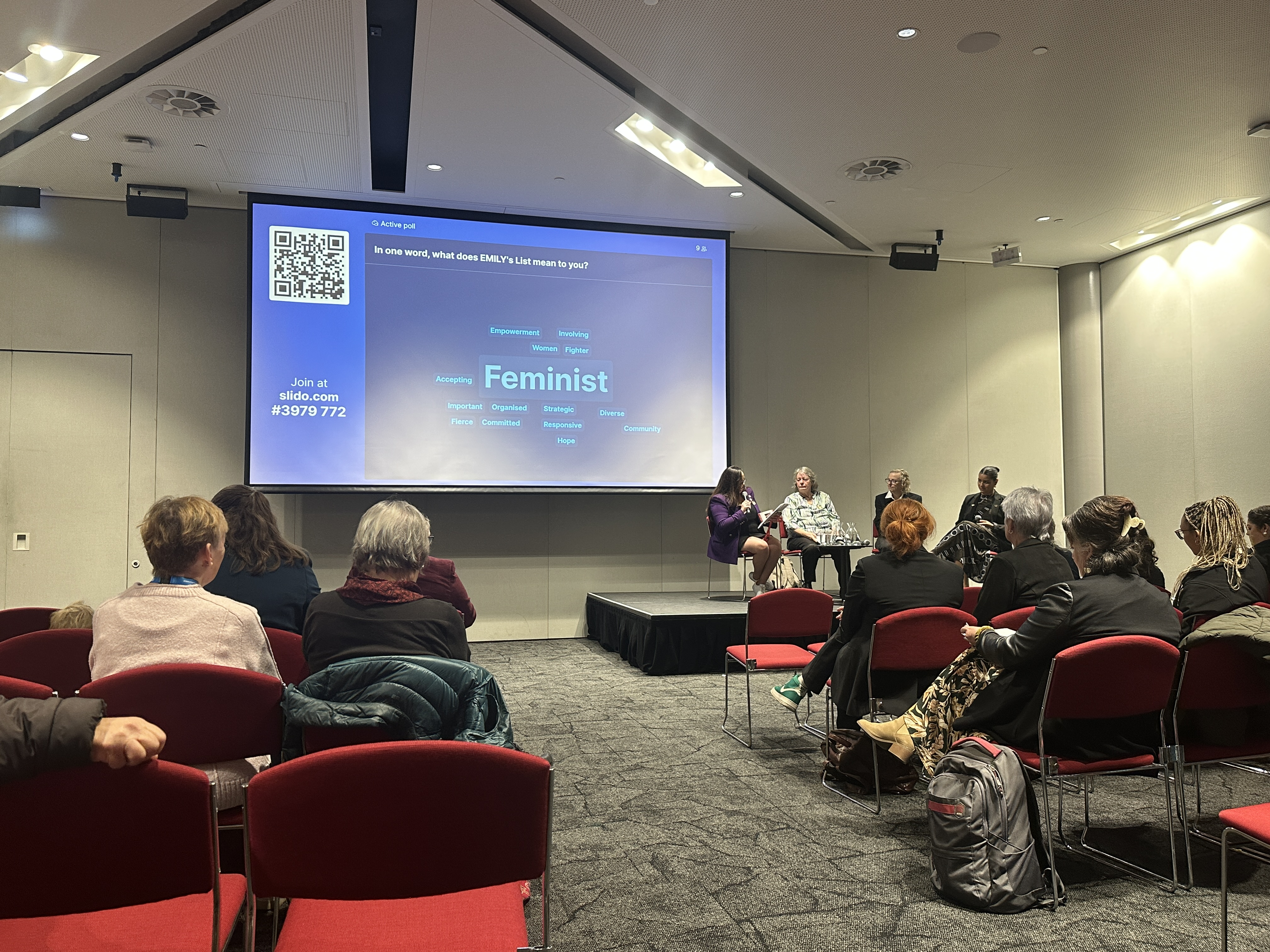

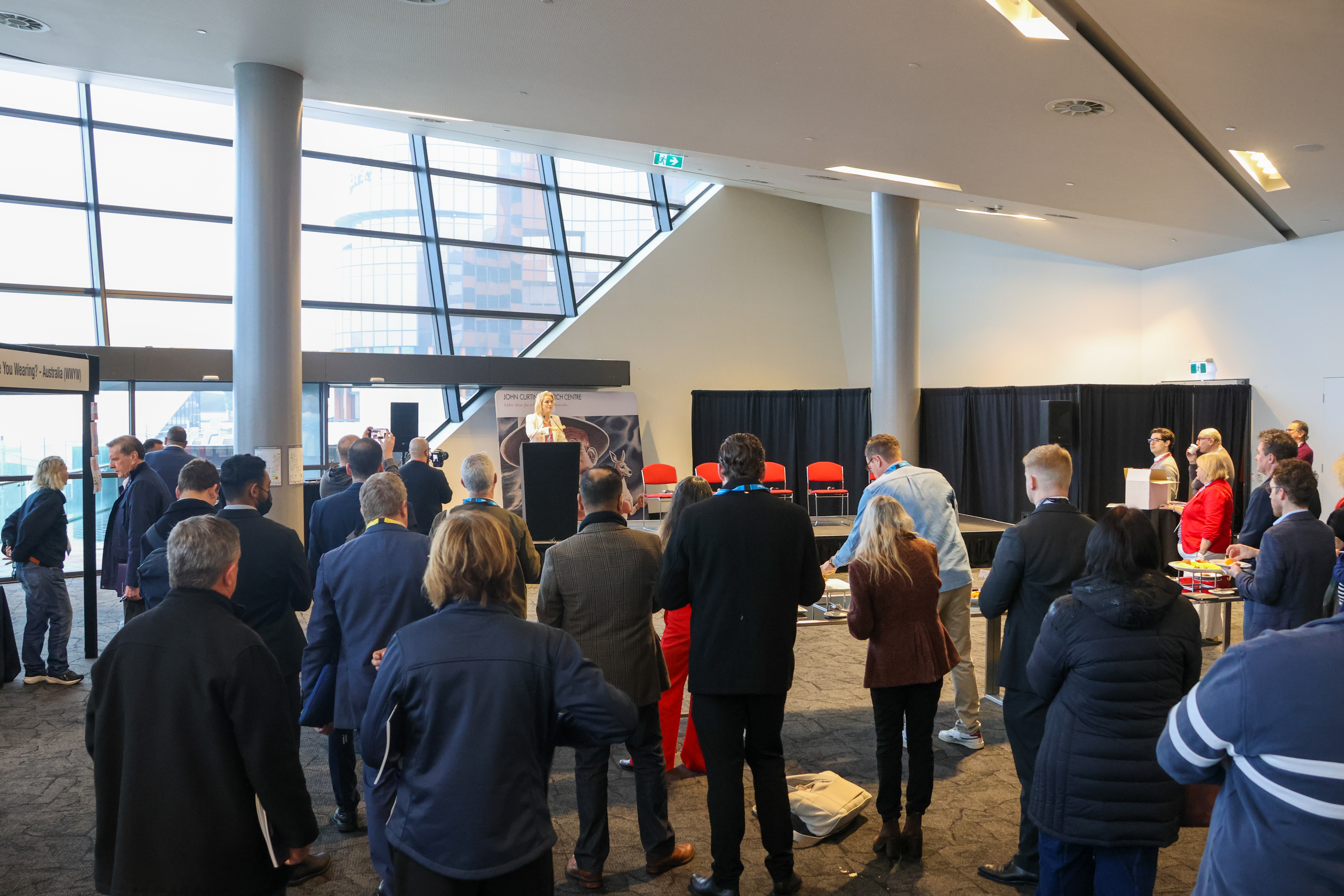

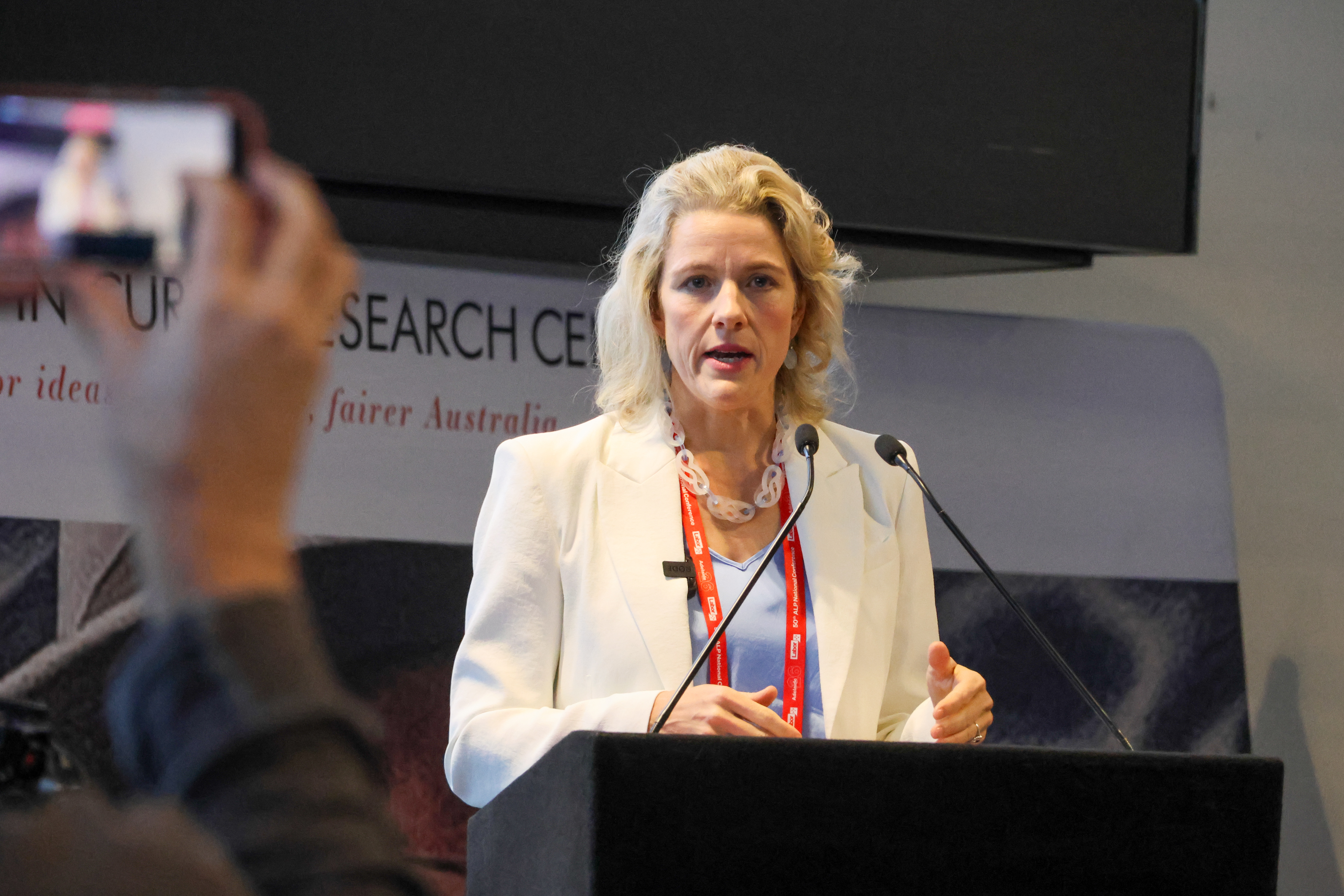

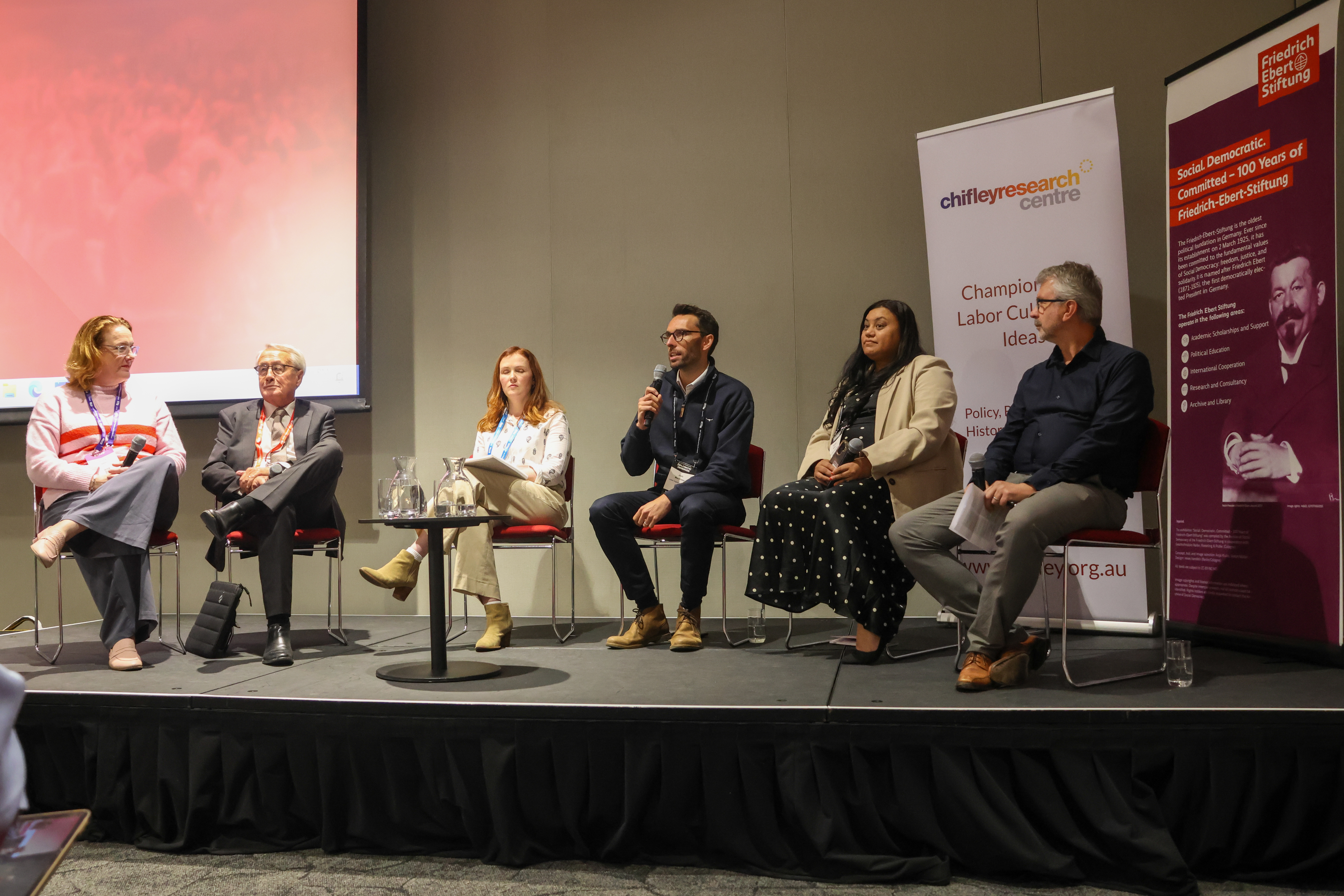

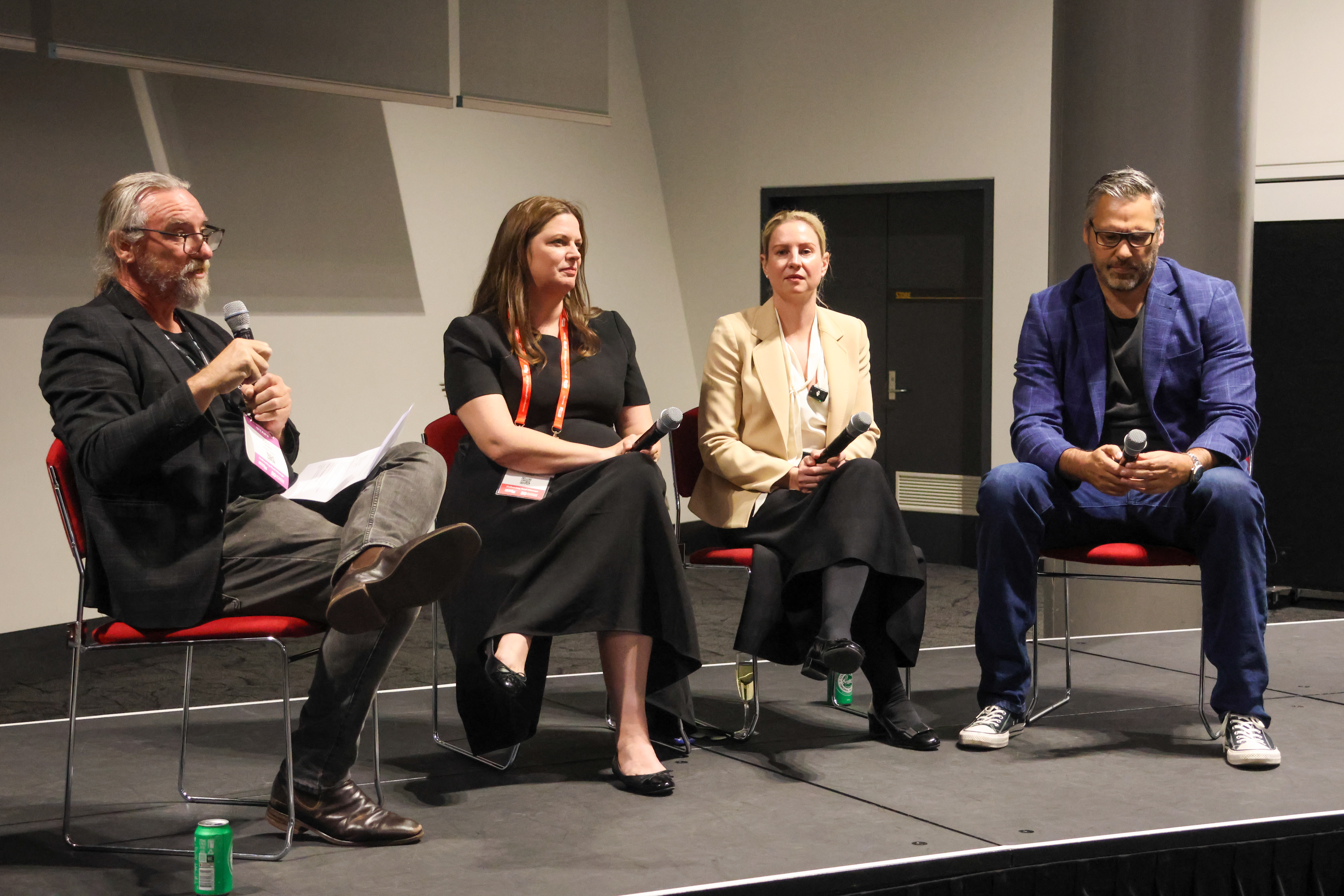

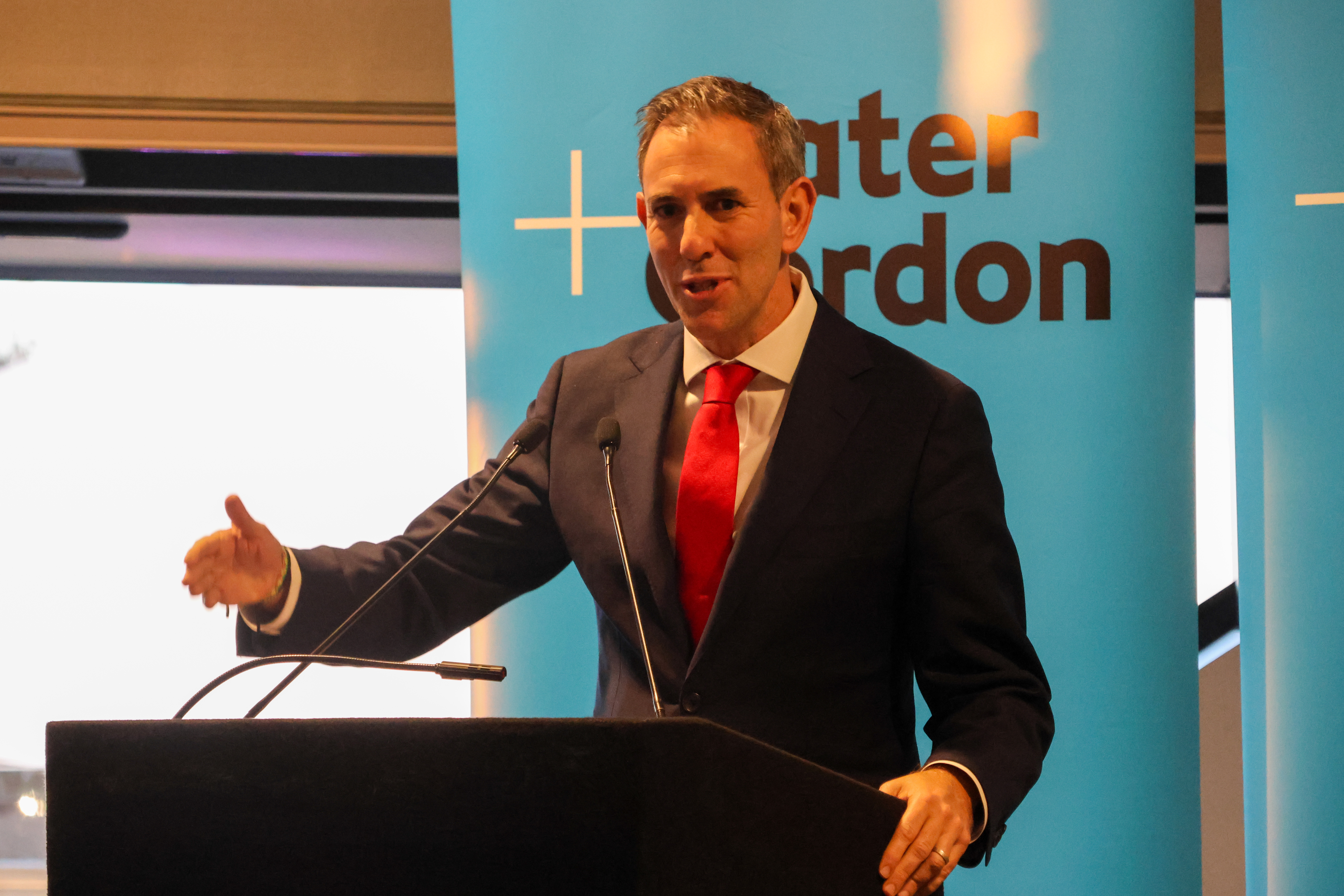

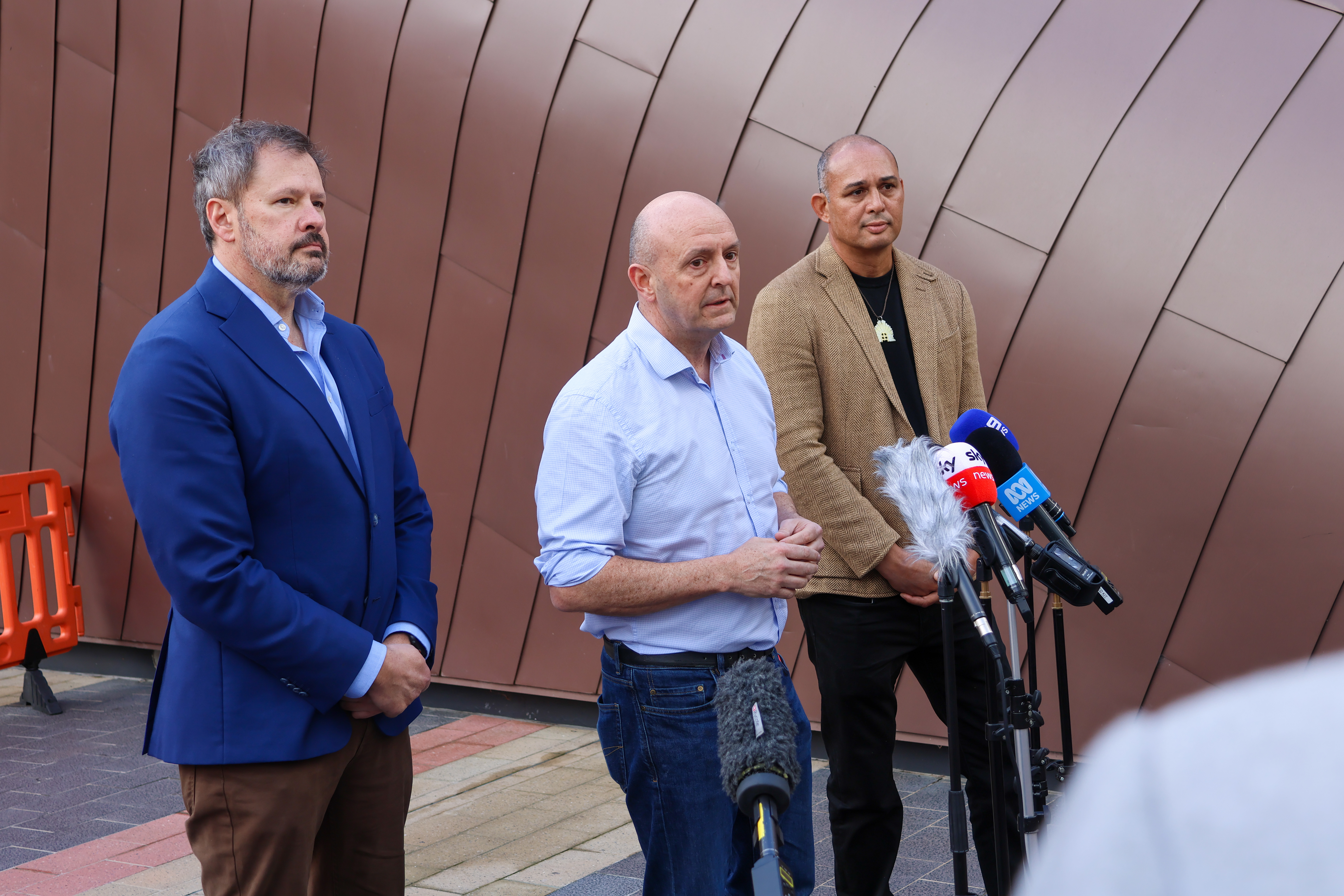

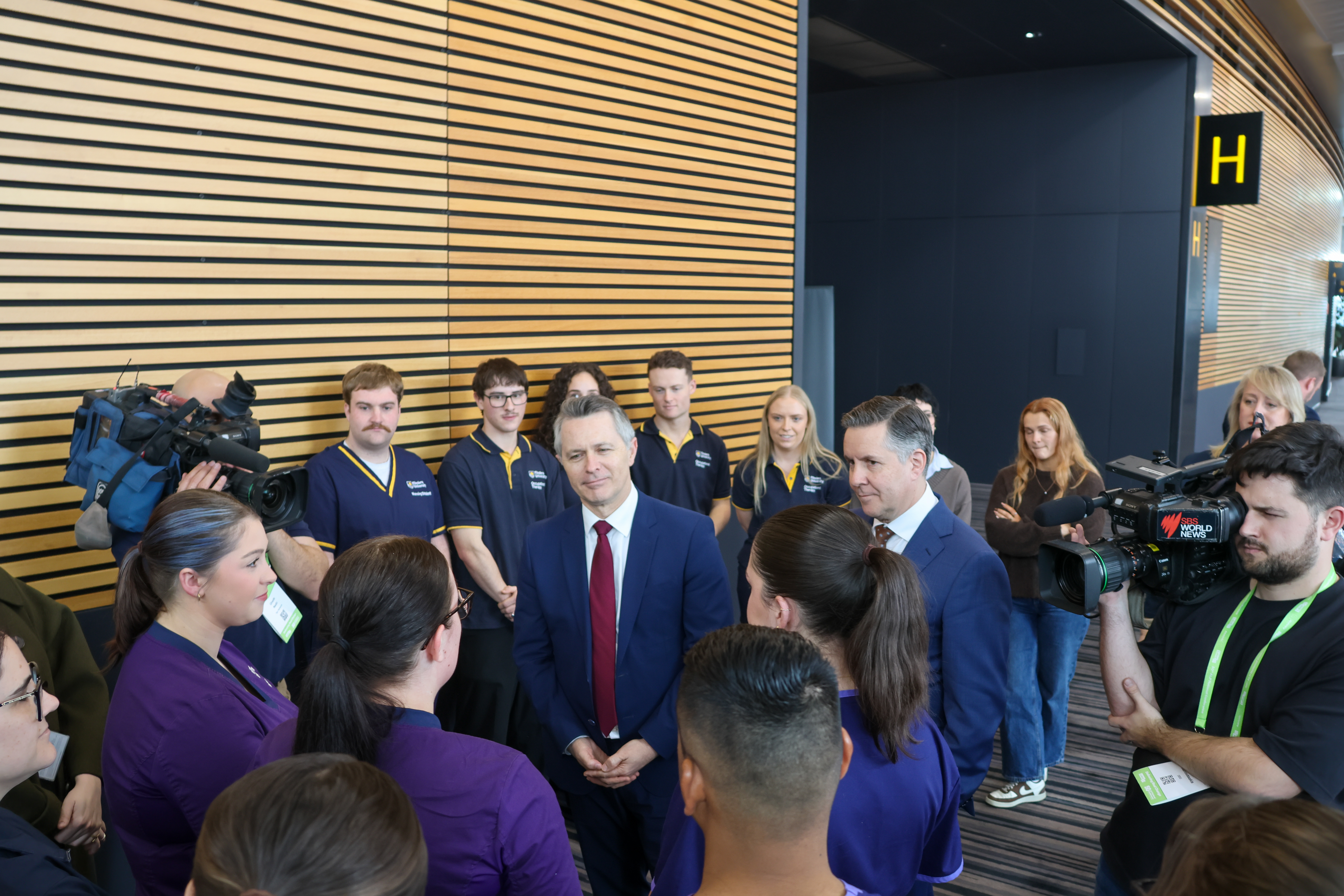

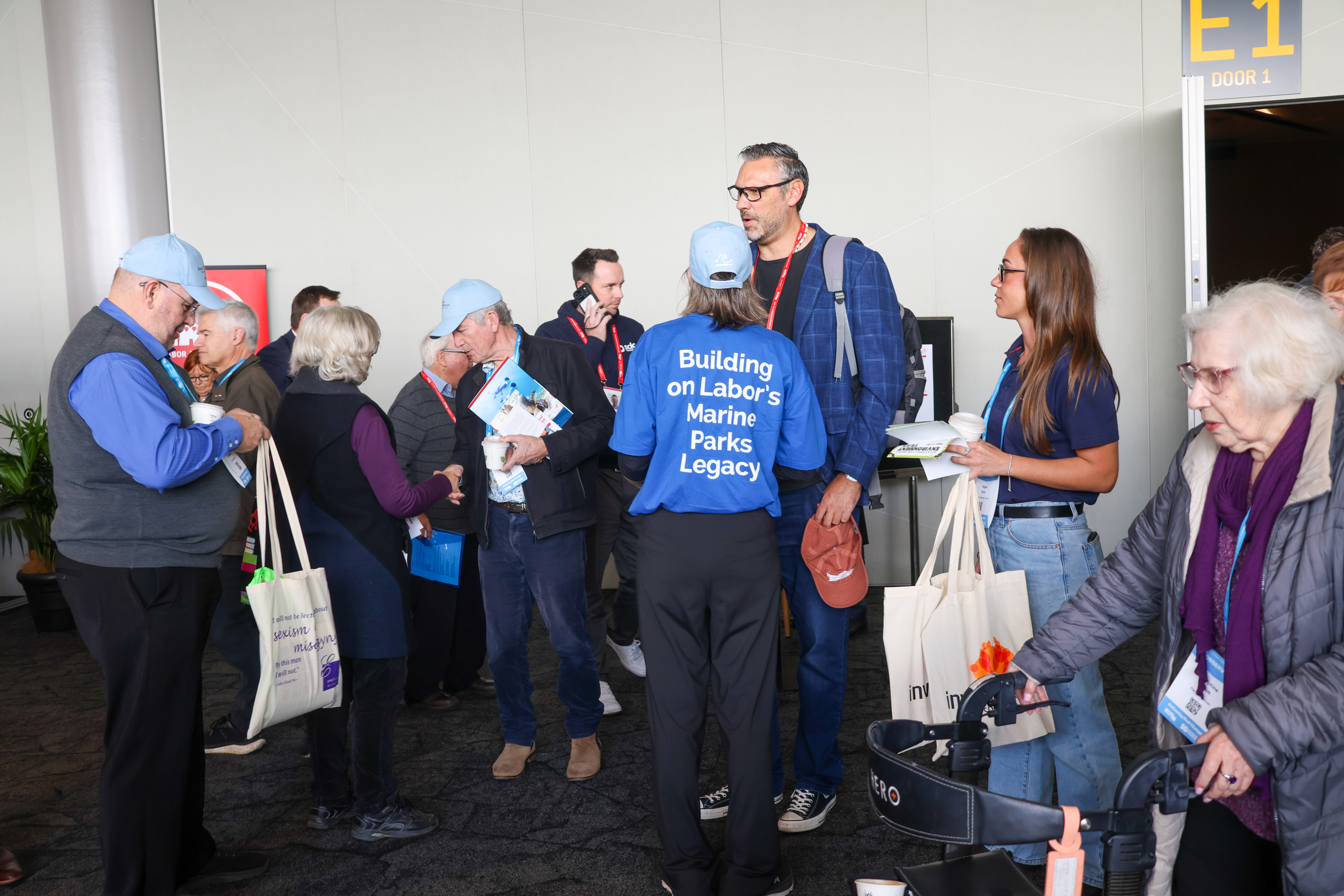

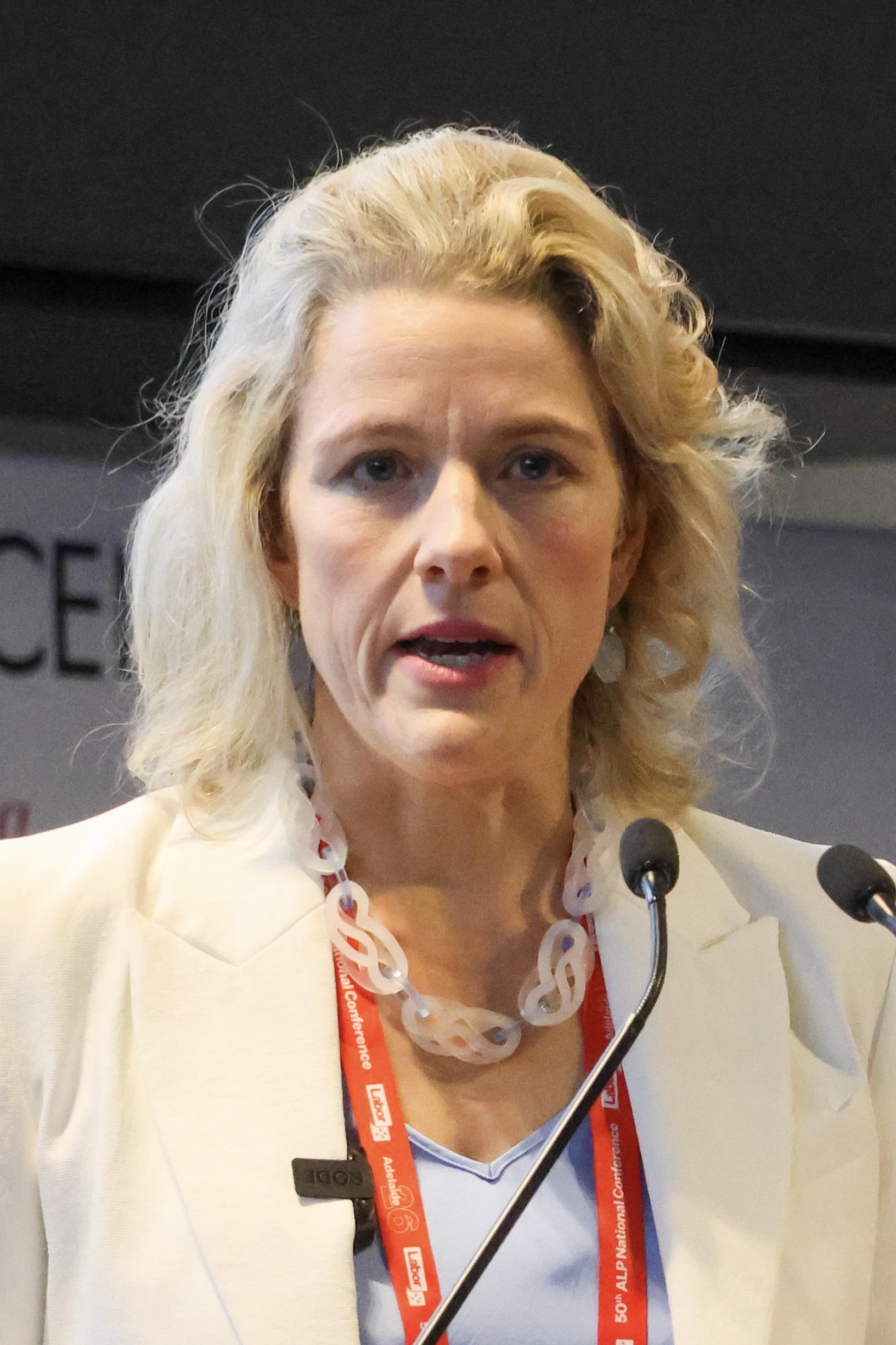

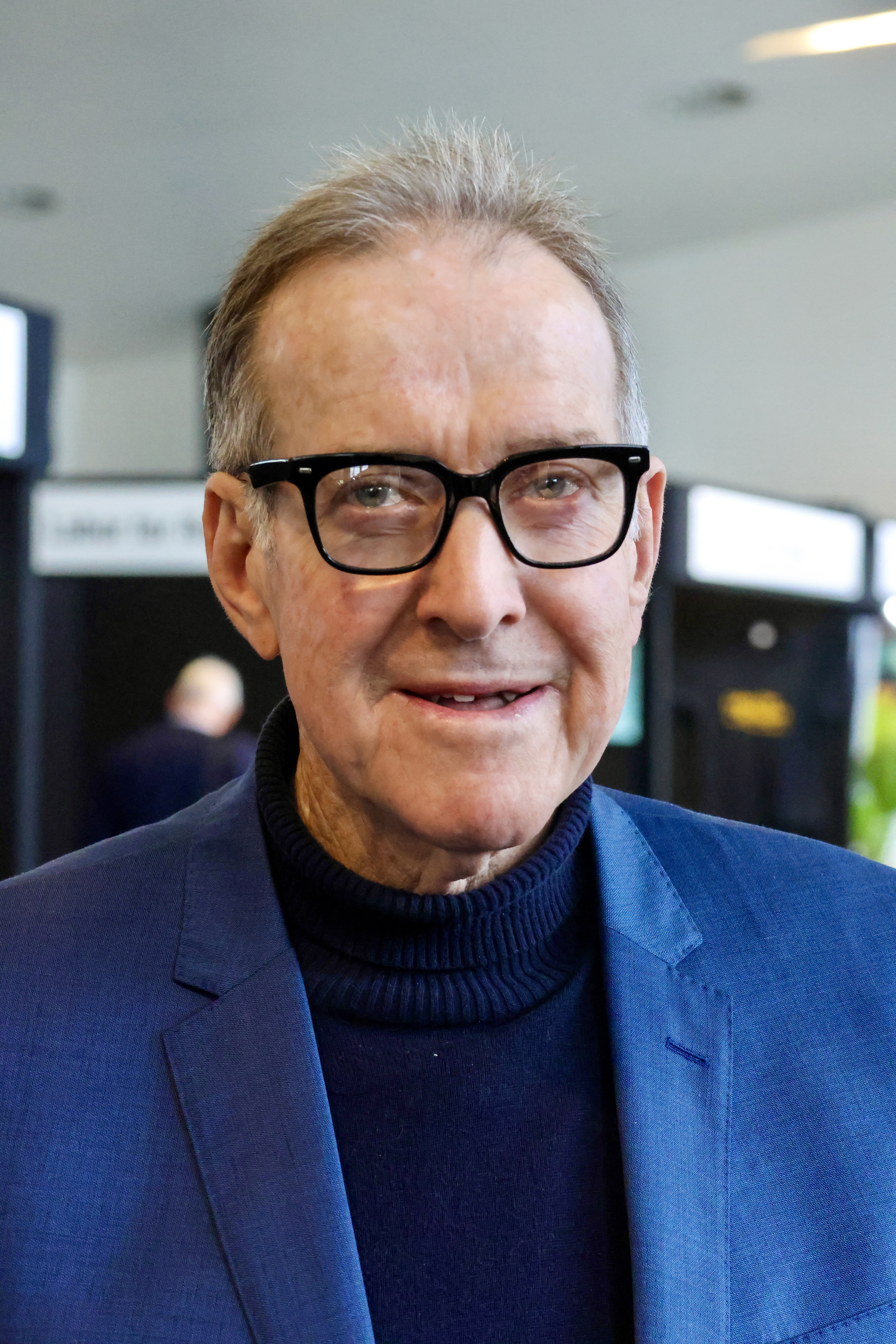

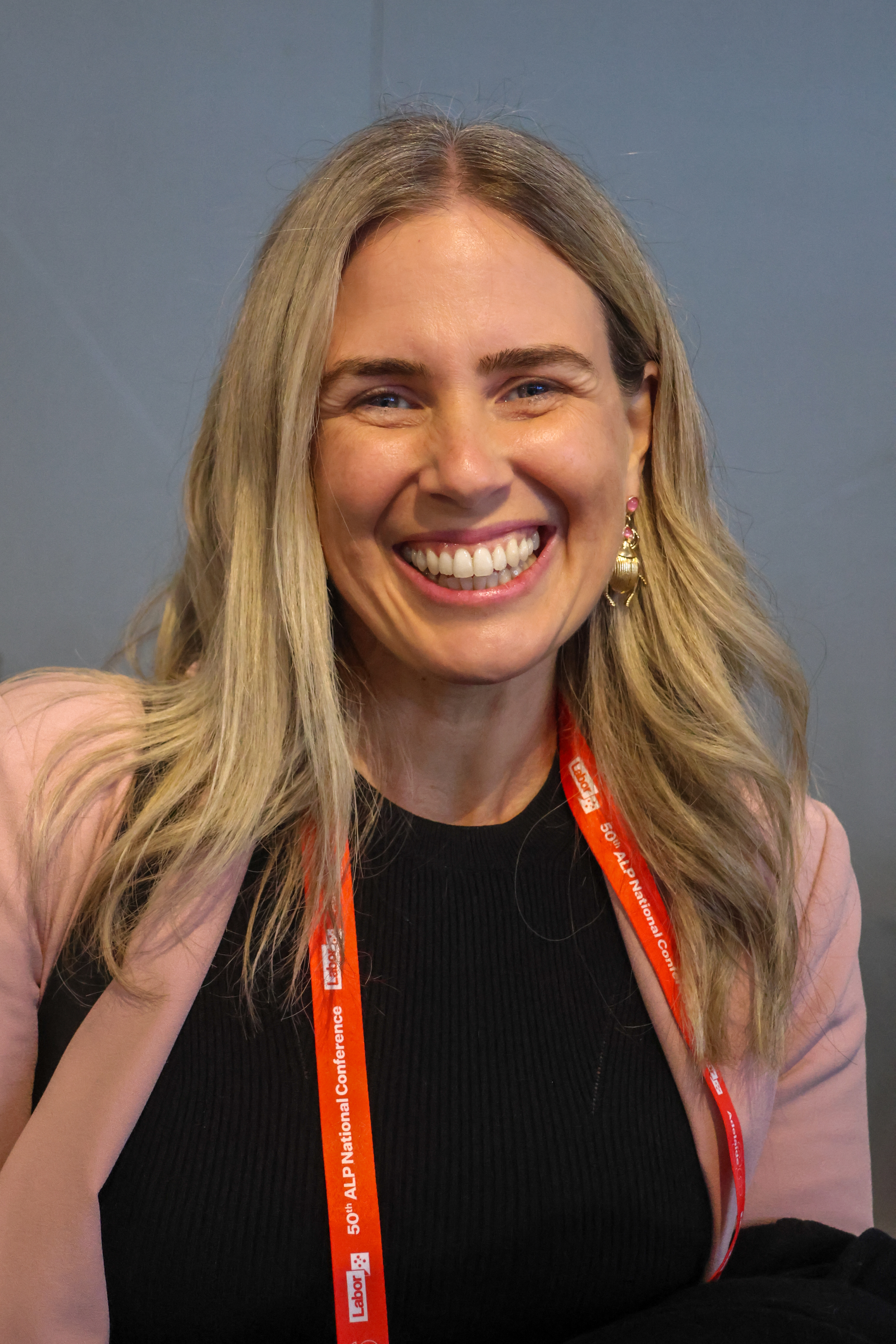

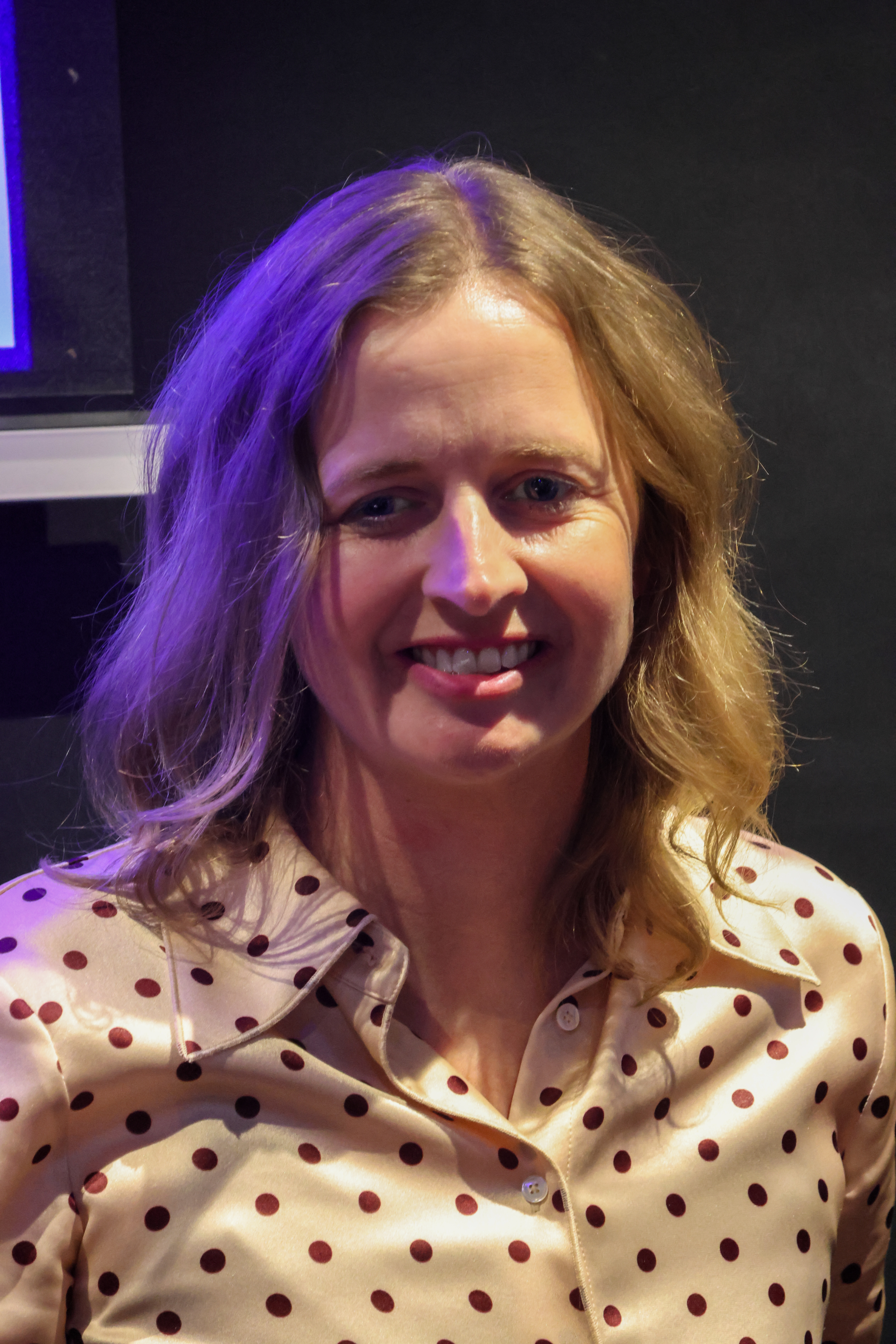

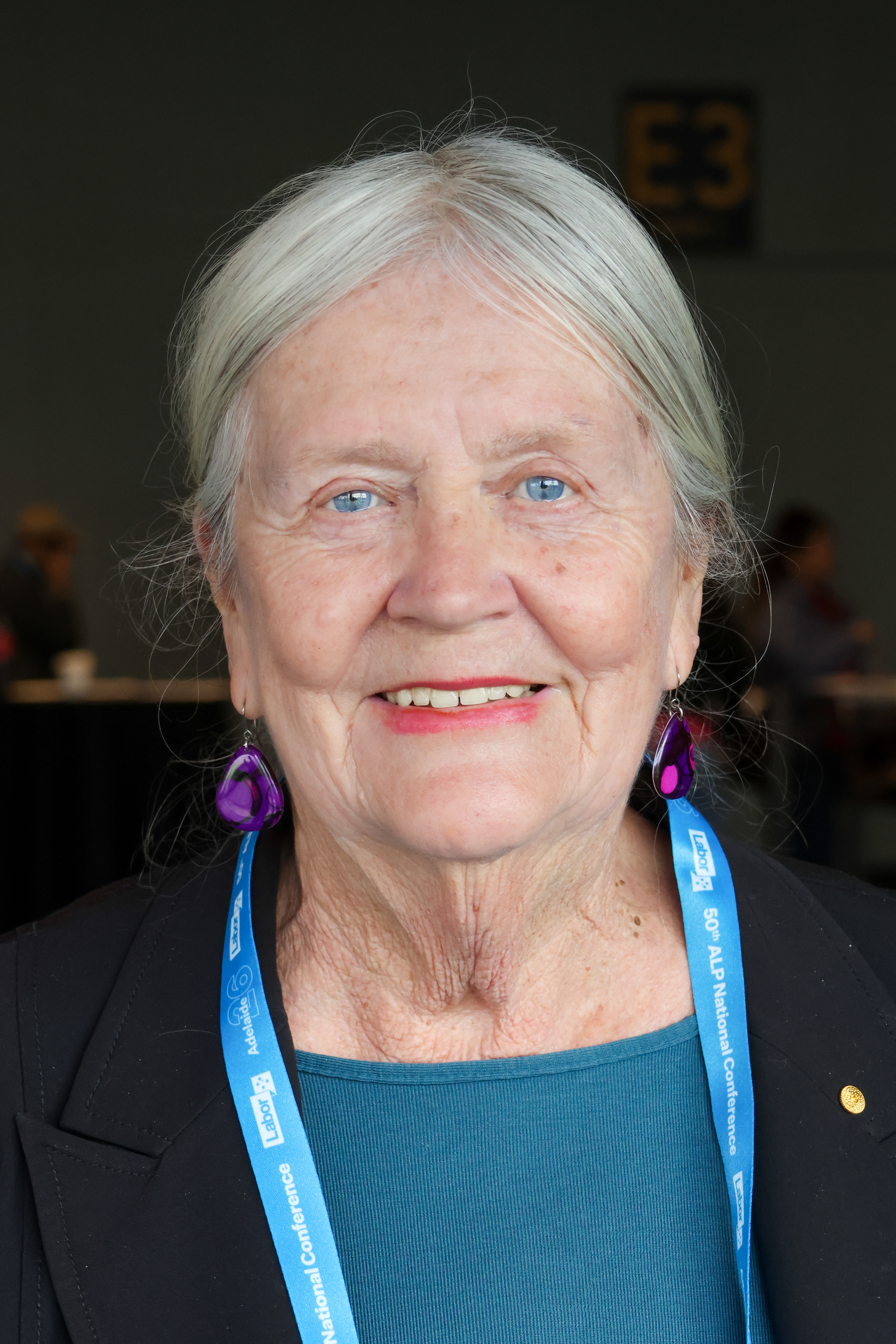

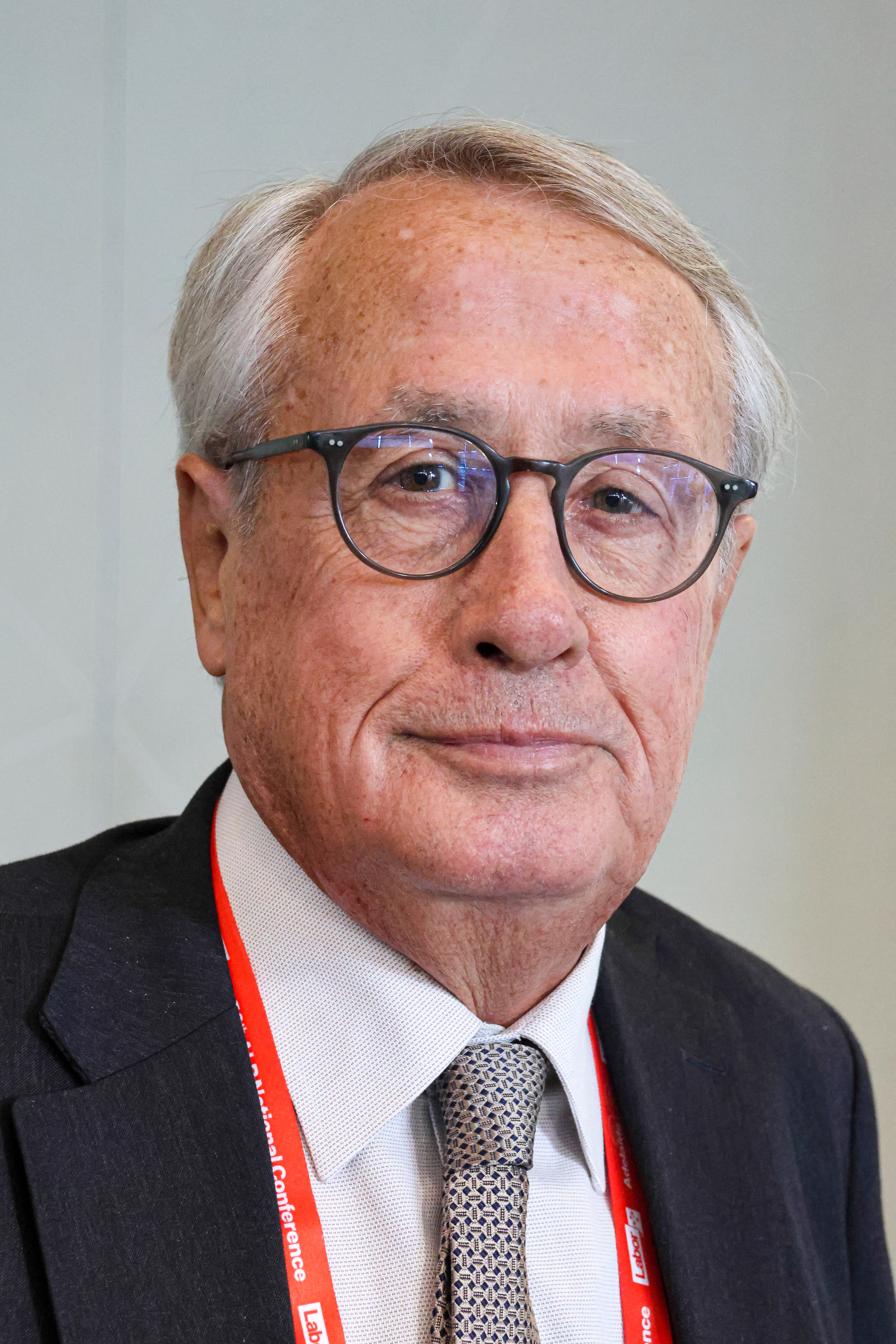

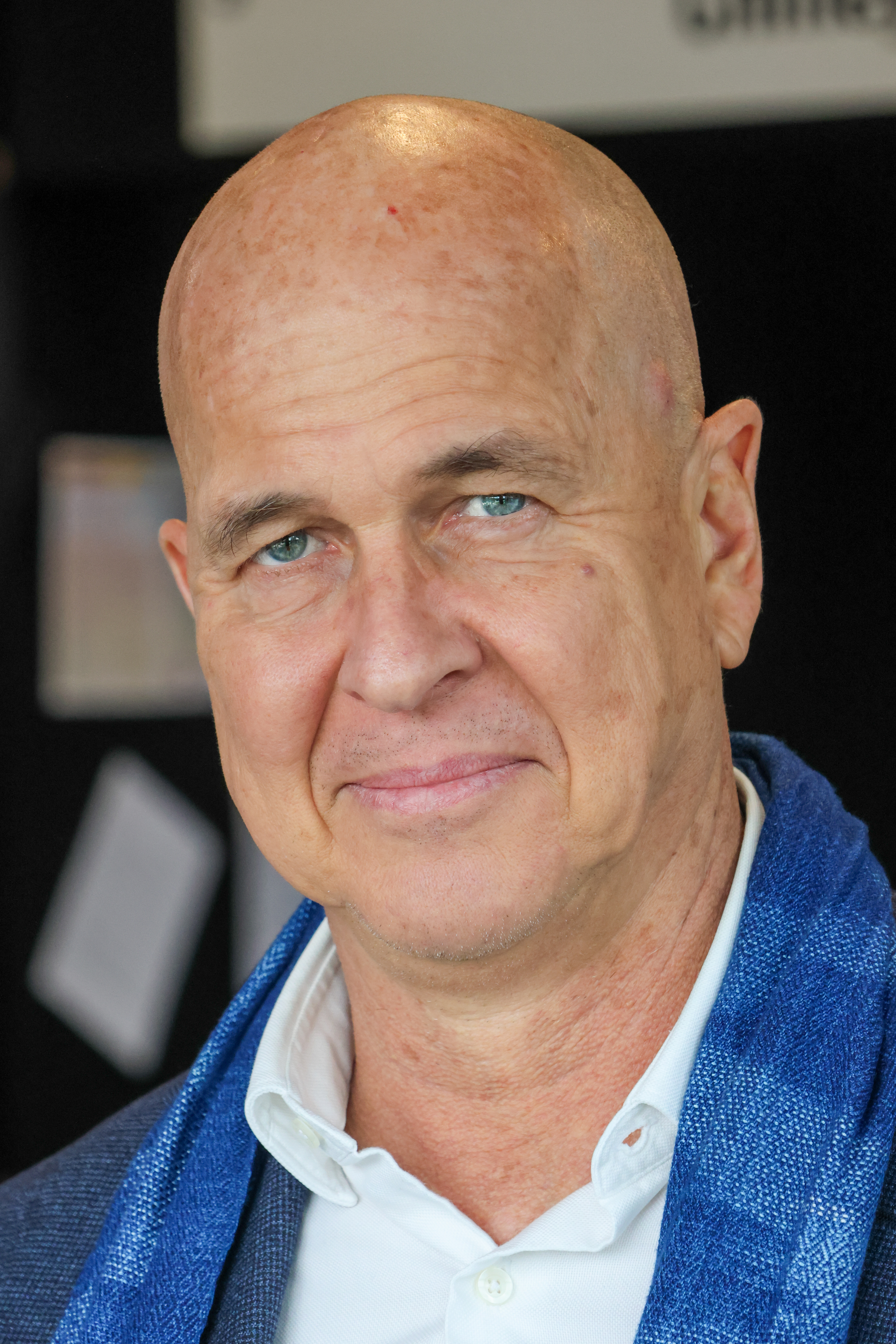

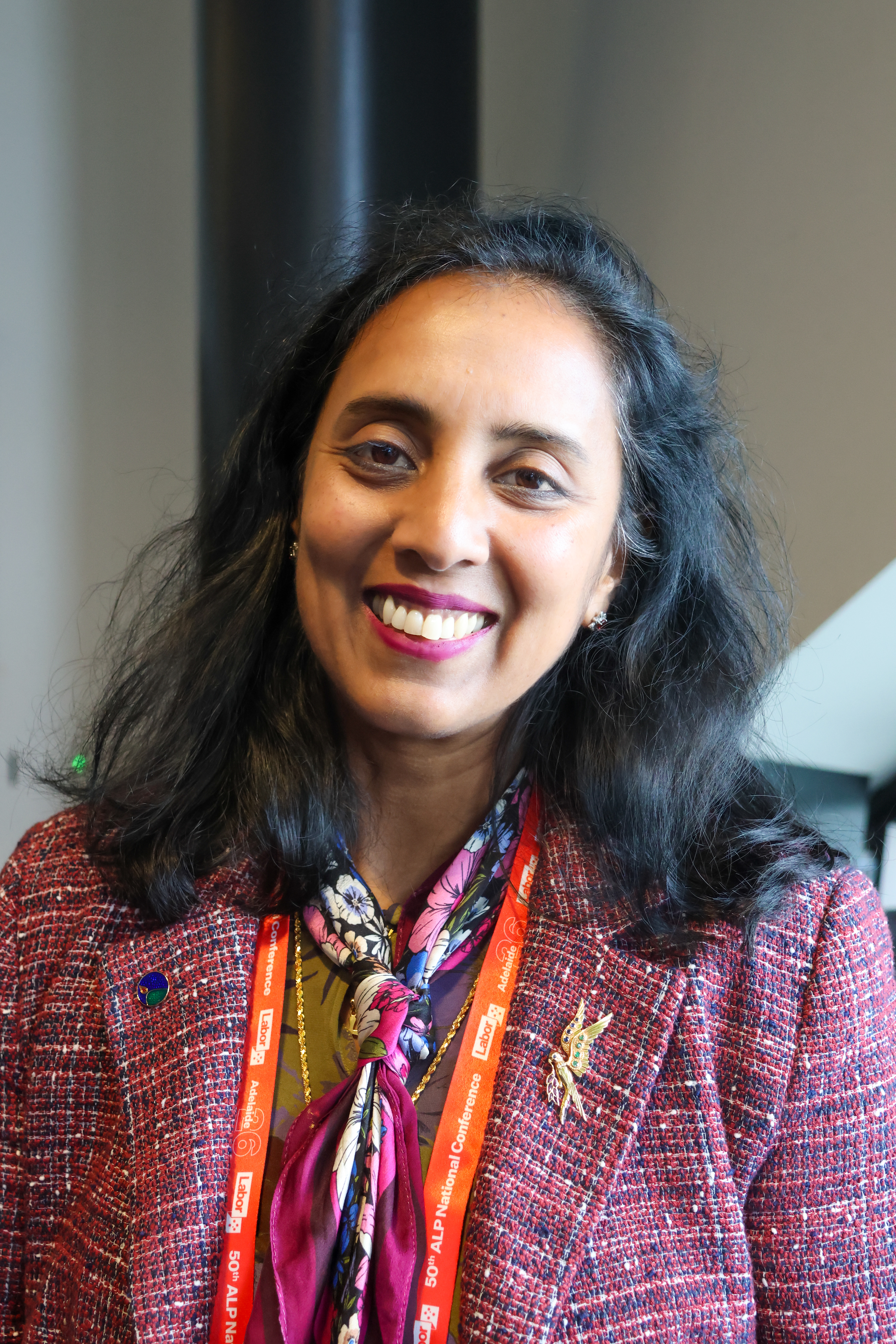

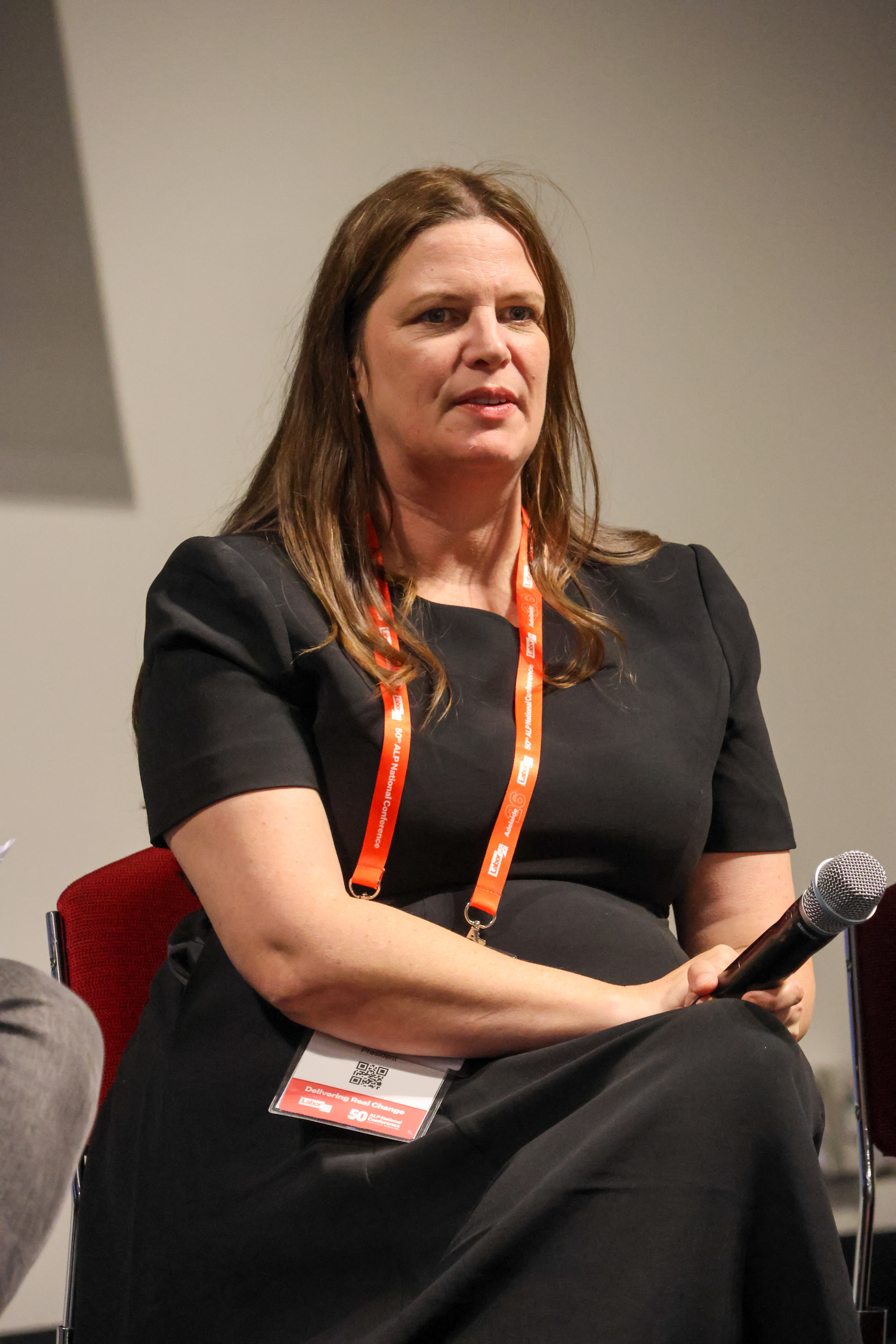

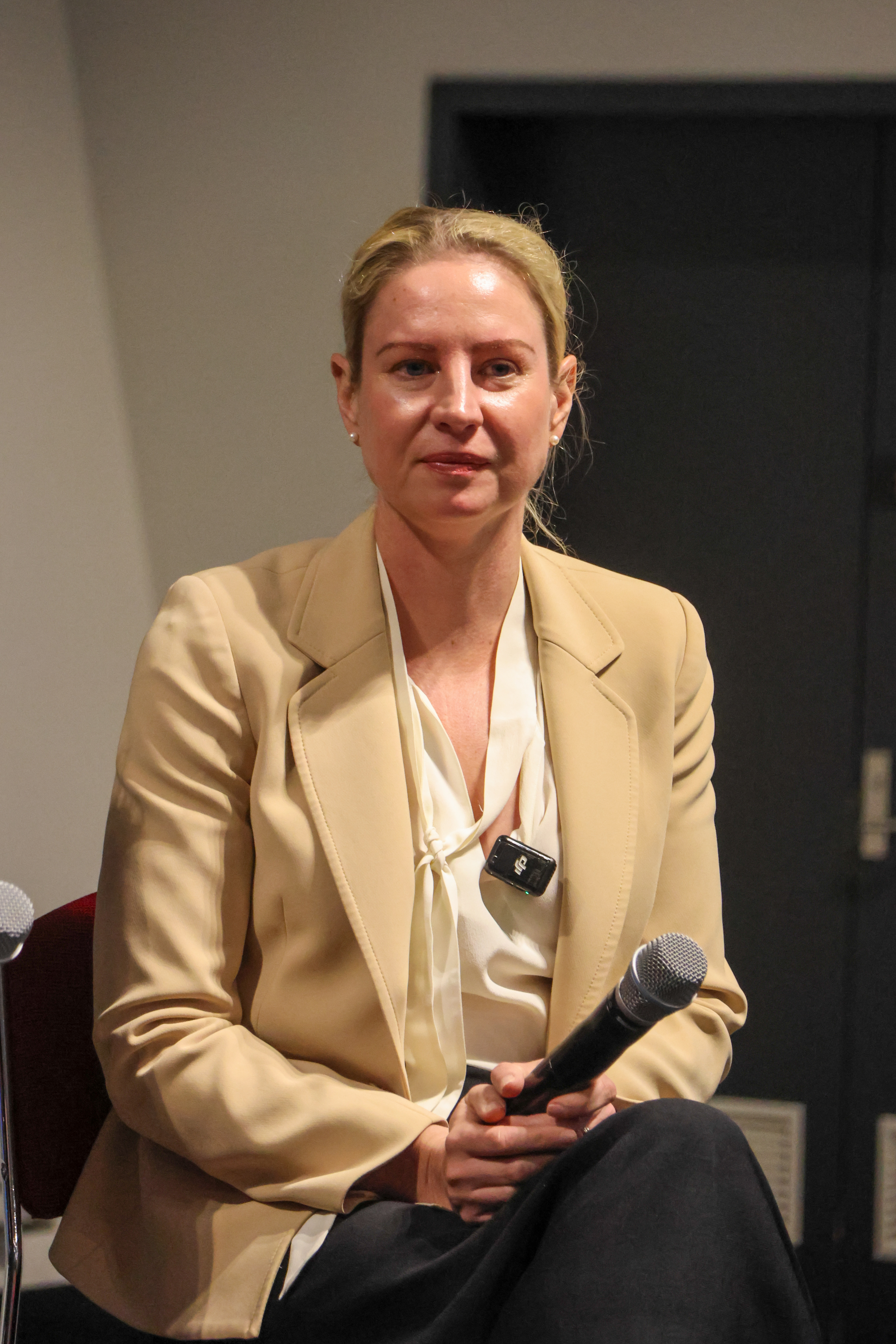

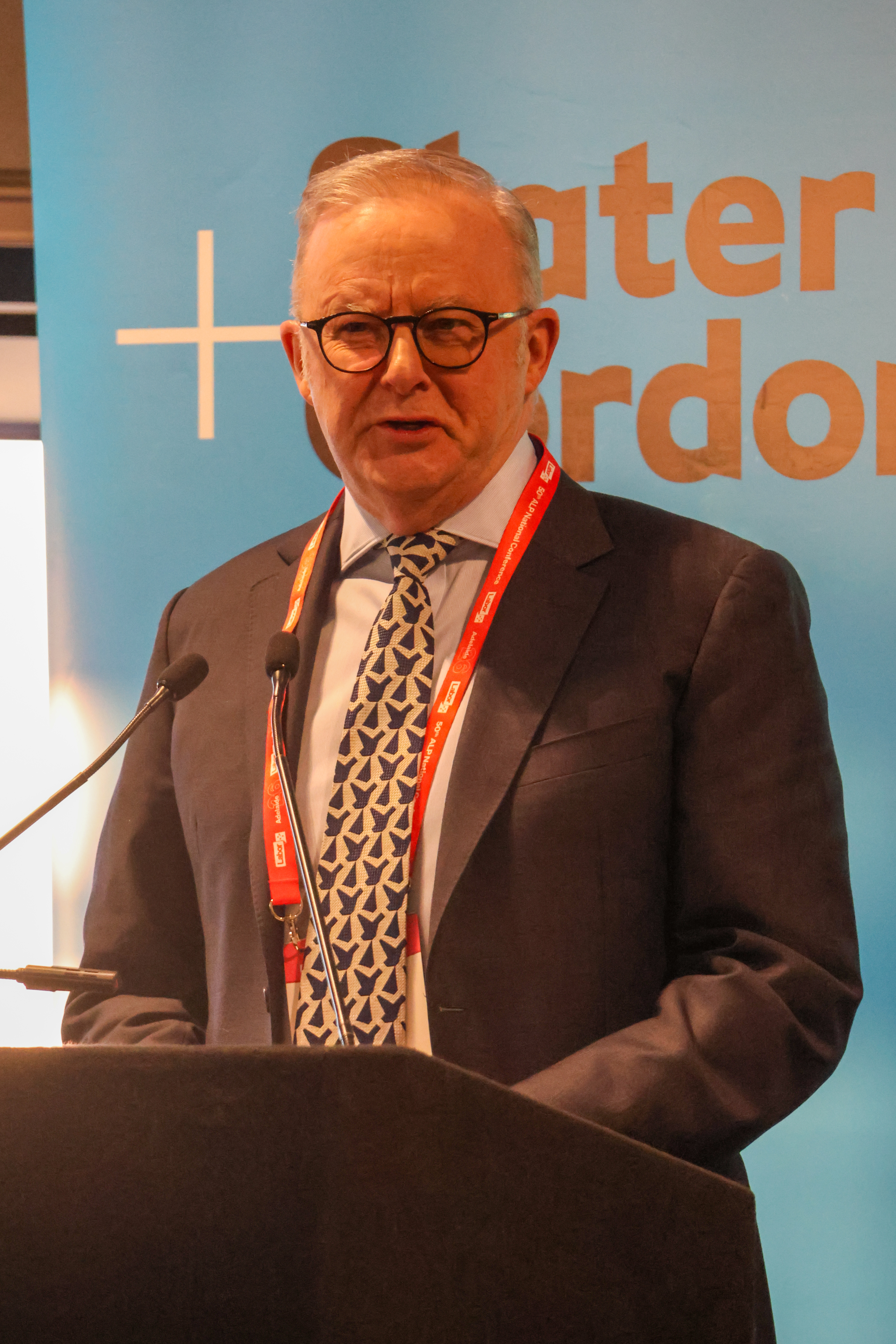

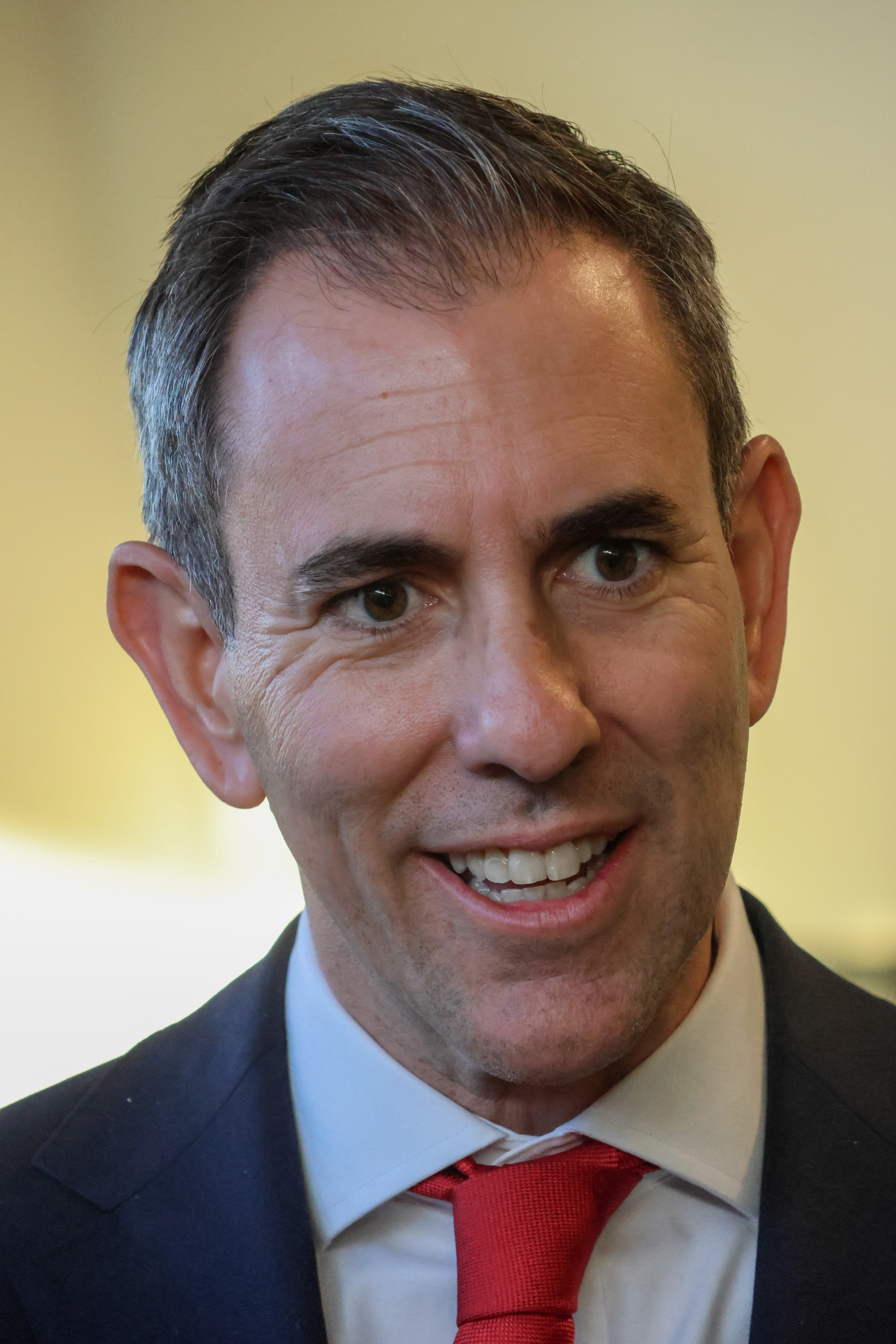

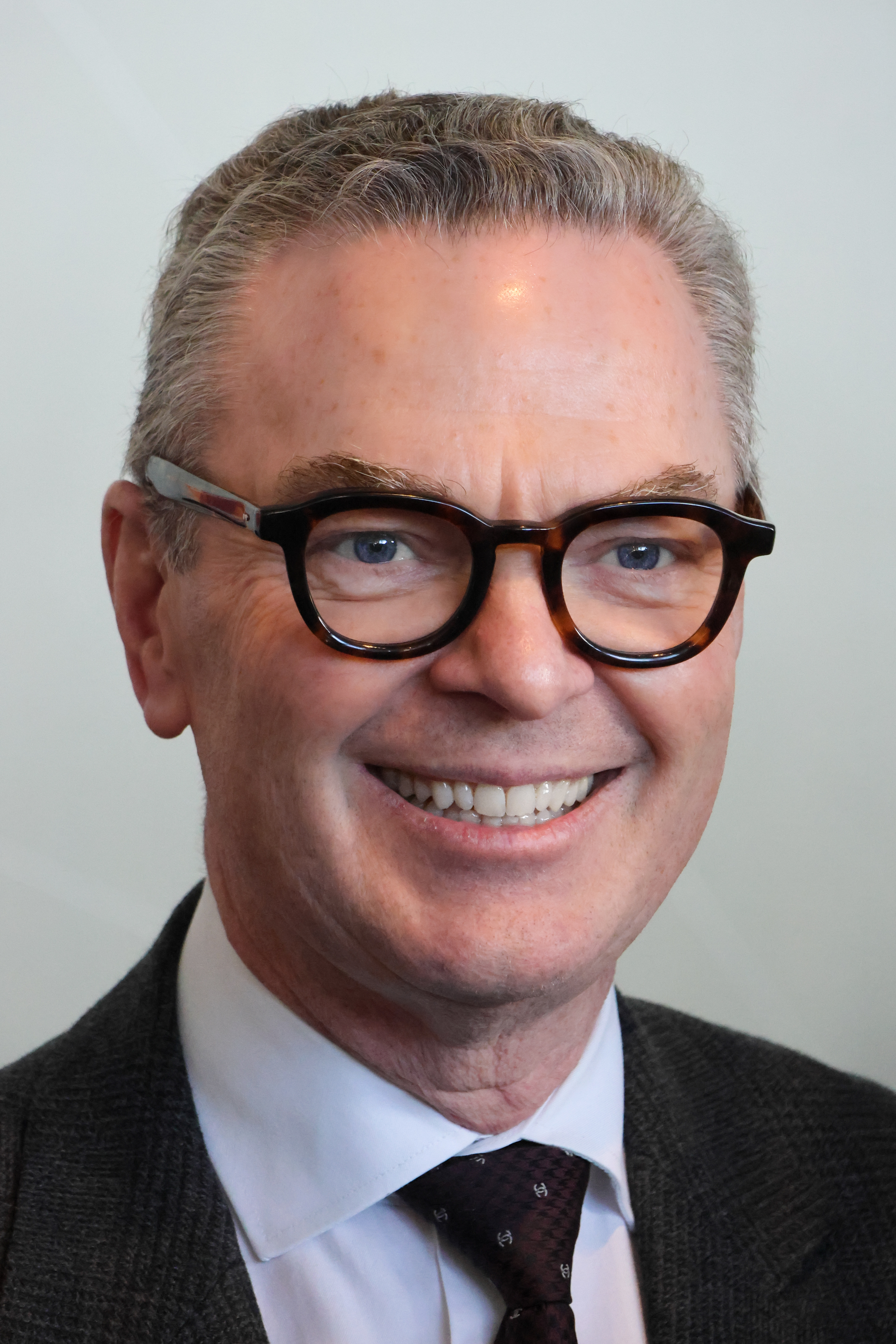

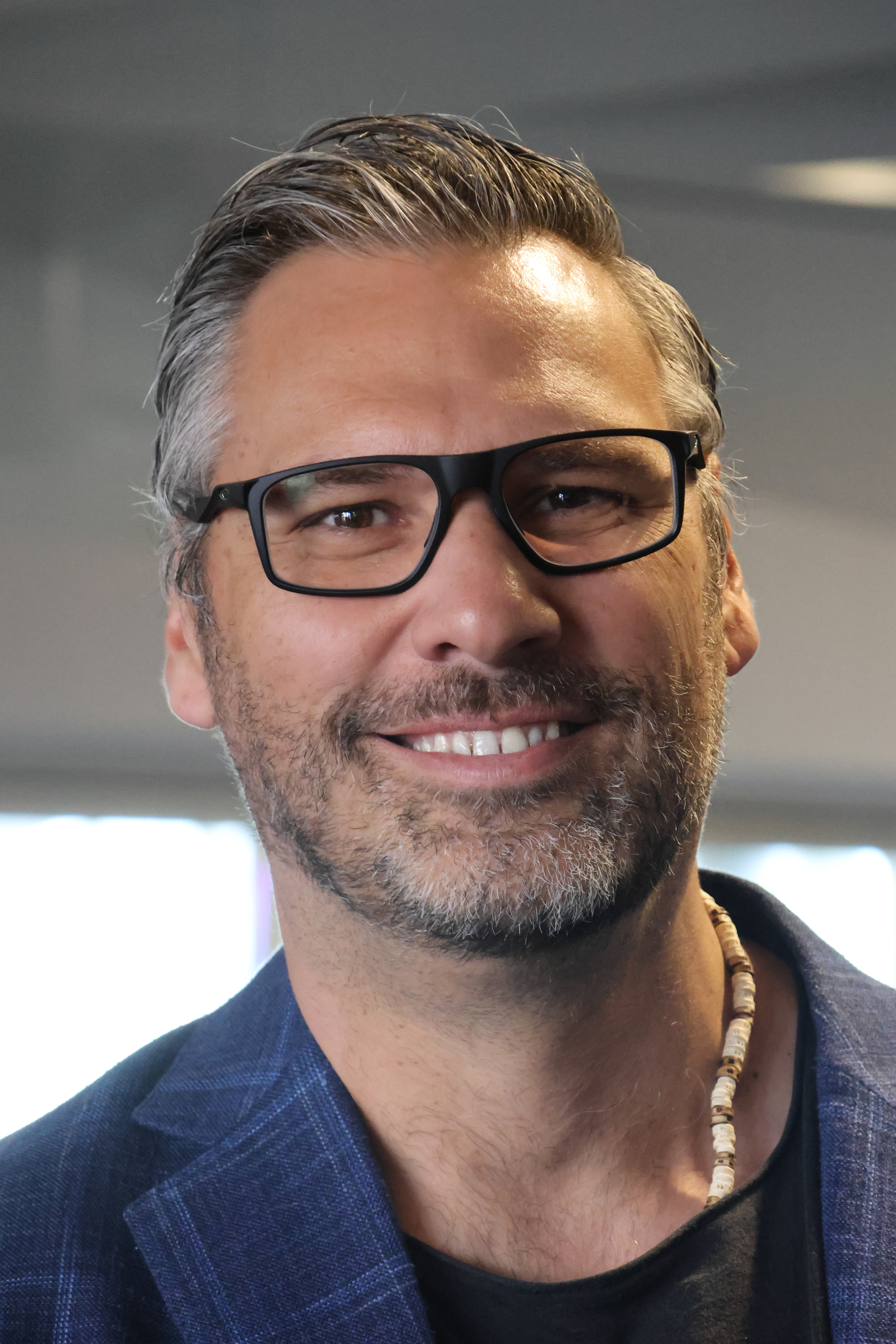

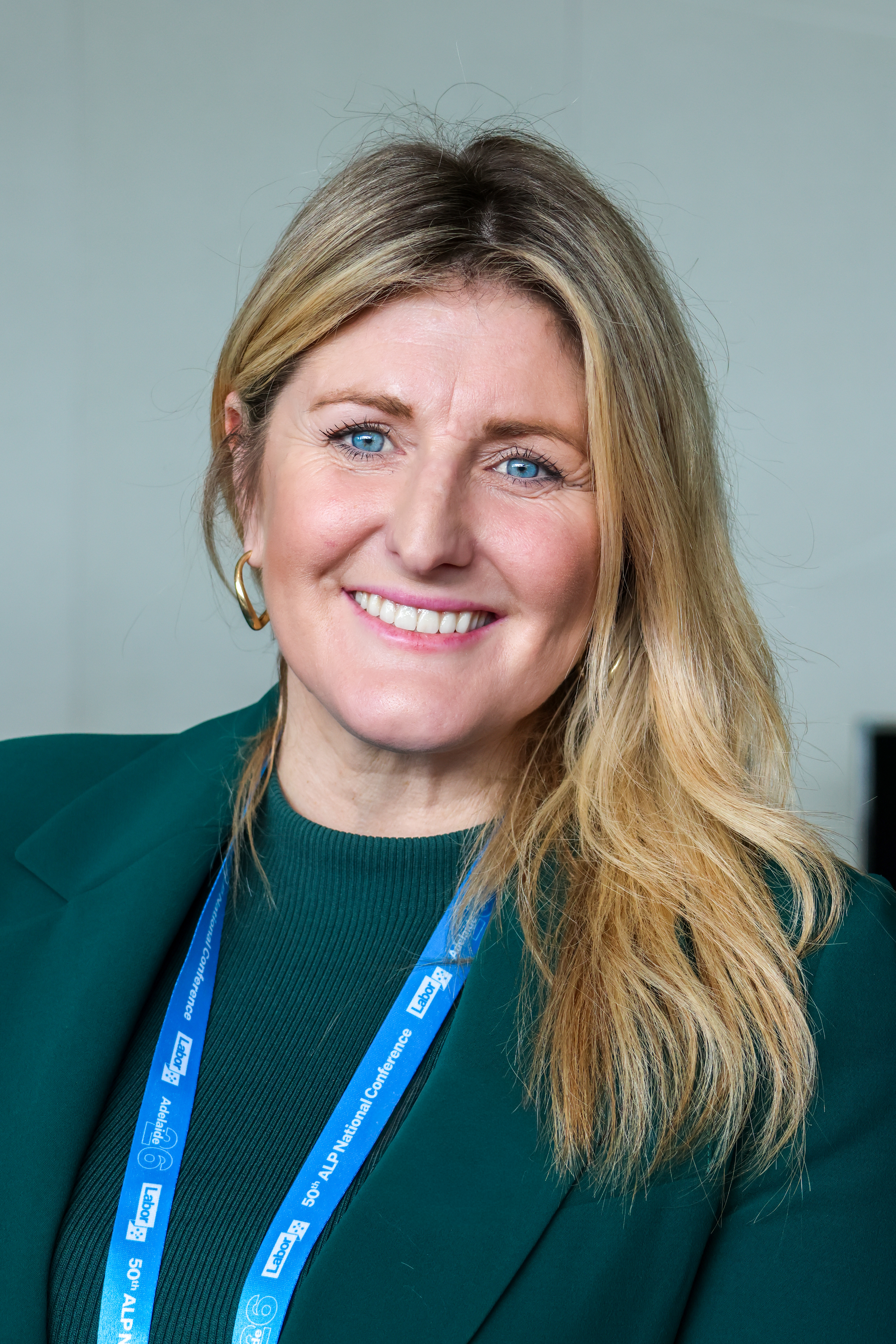

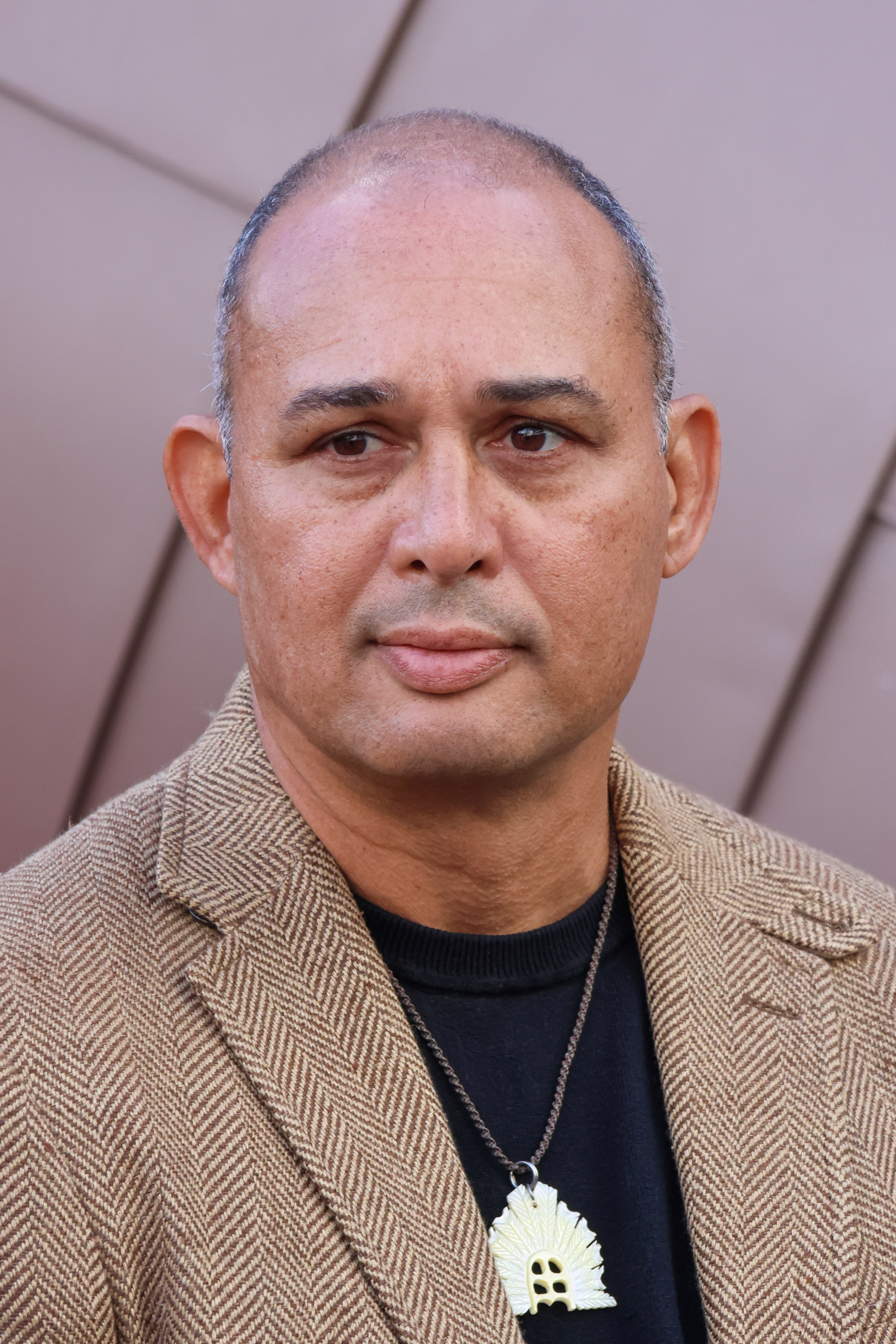

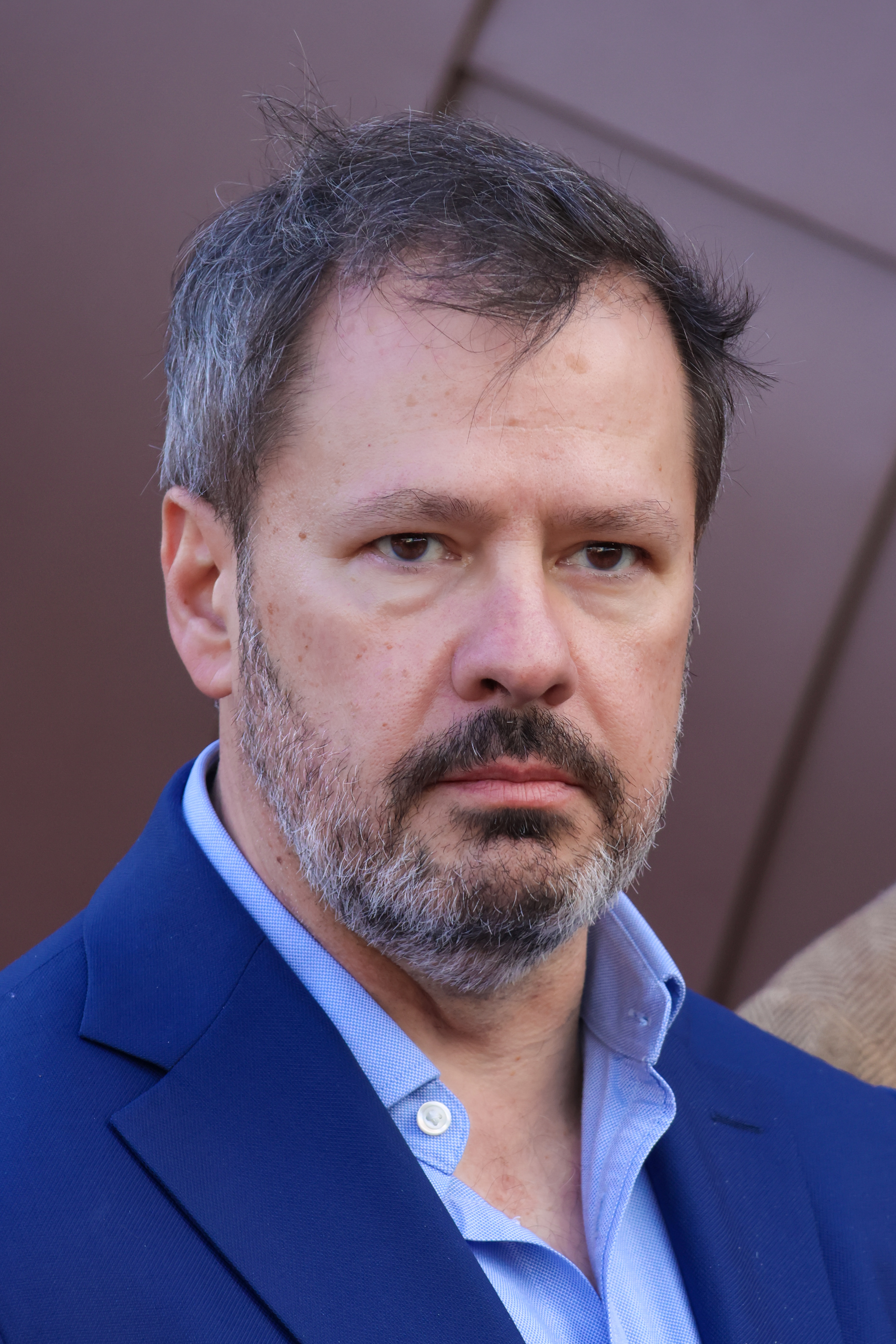

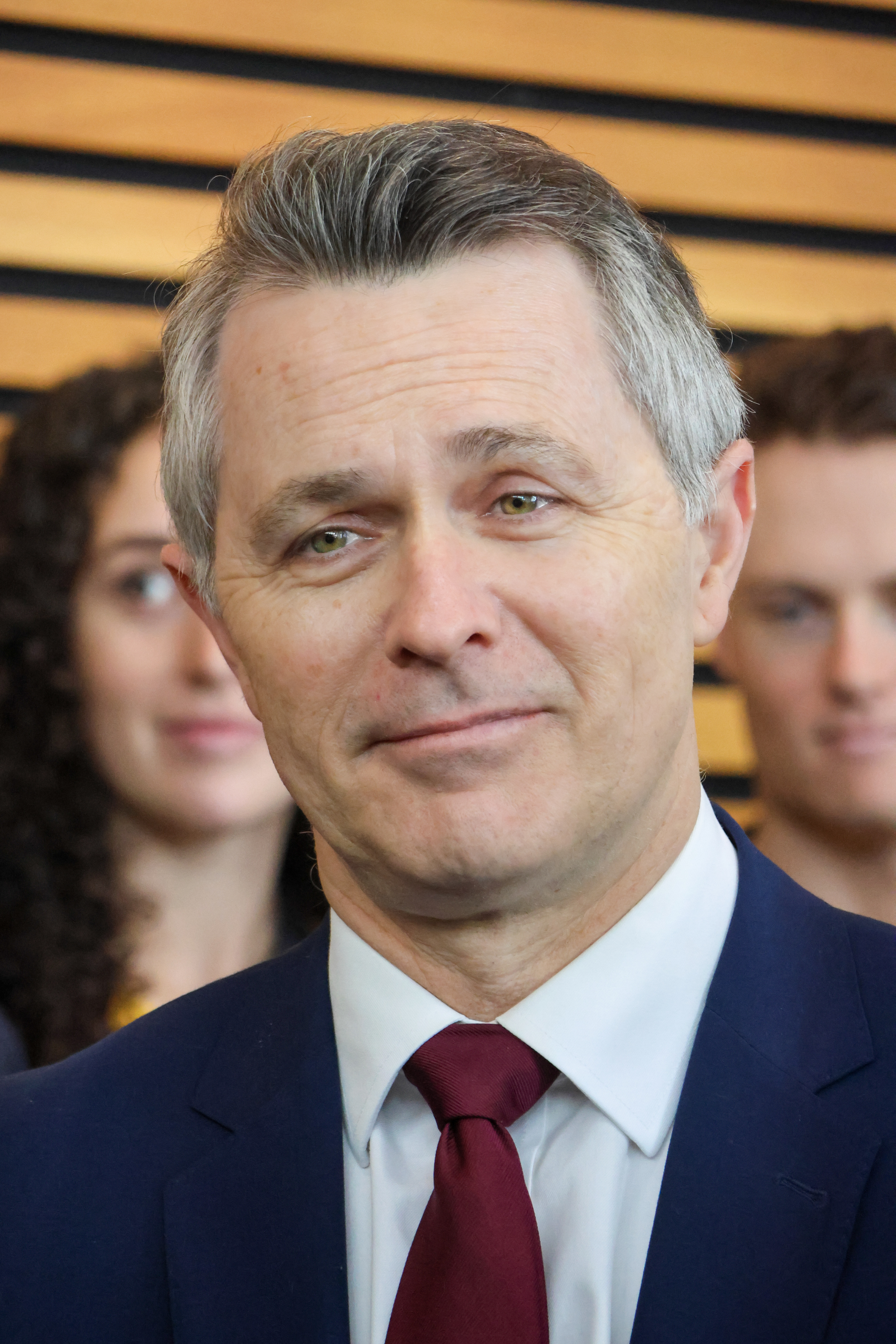

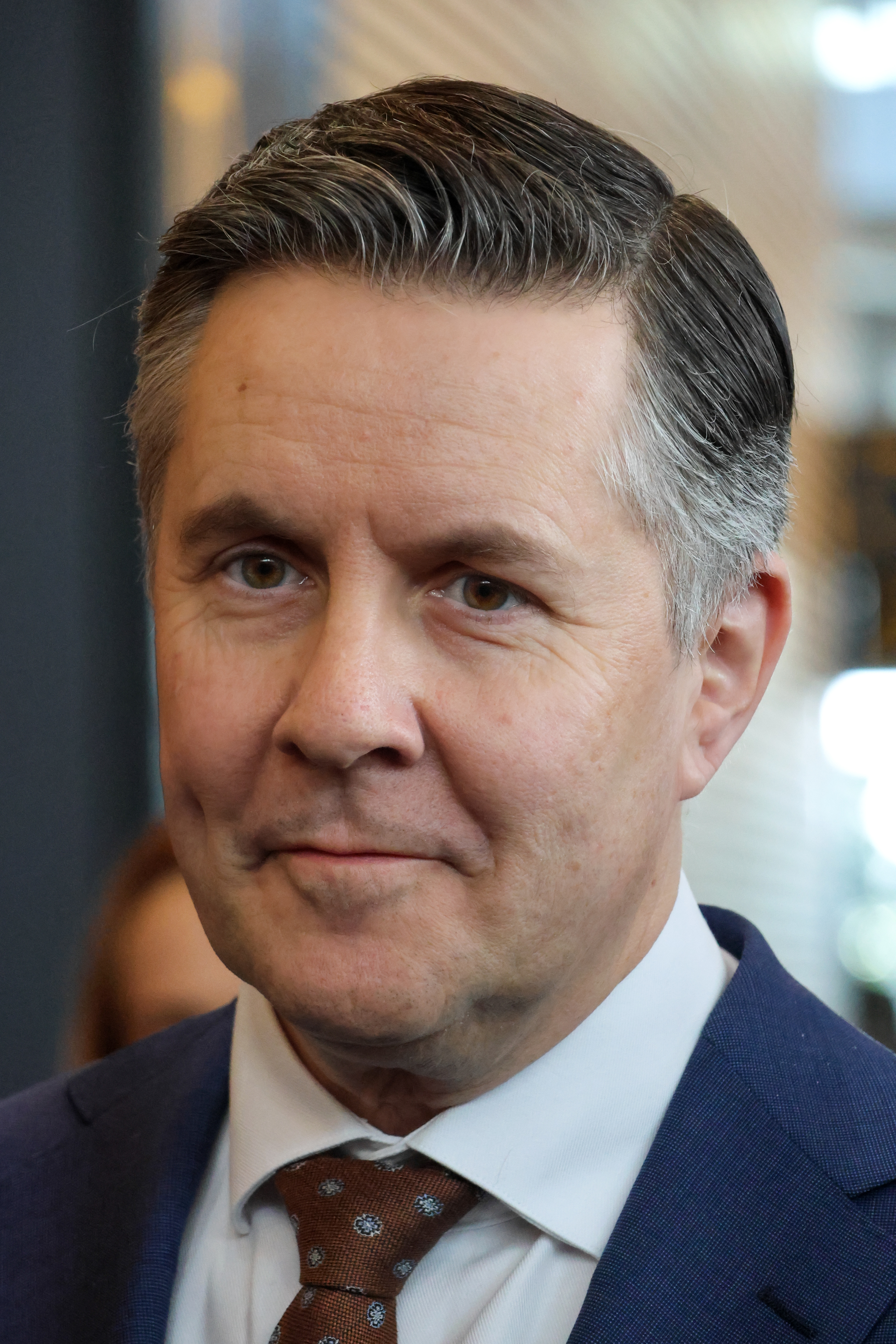
