= Electoral district of Yuroke =

State electoral district of Victoria, Australia

Yuroke Victoria—Legislative Assembly
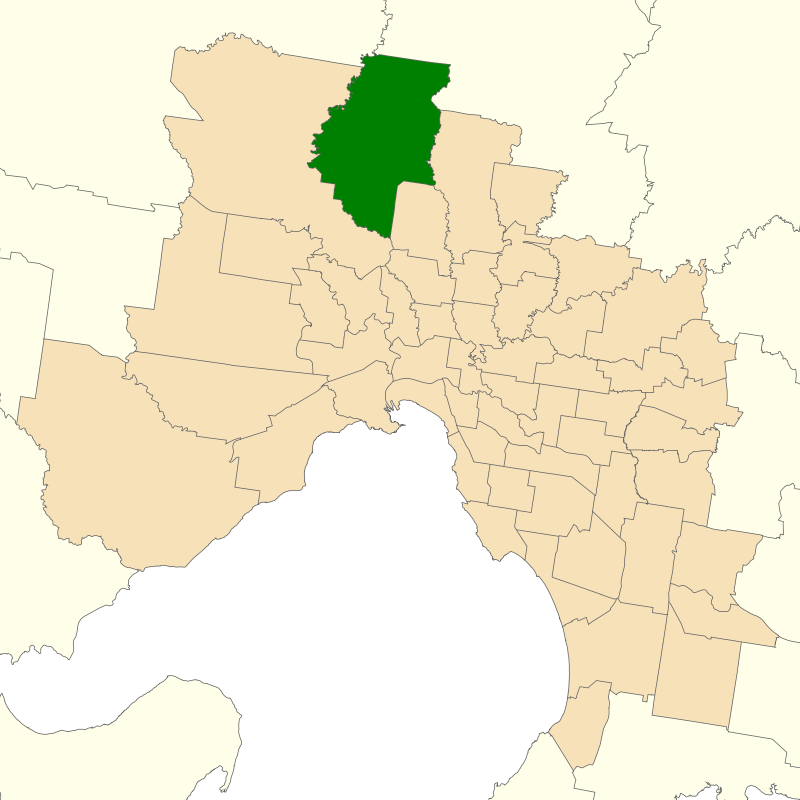
- Location of Yuroke (dark green) in Greater Melbourne
- State: Victoria
- Created: 2002
- Abolished: 2022
- MP: Ros Spence
- Party: Labor Party
- Electors: 58,068 (2018)
- Area: 180 km^{2} (69.5 sq mi)
- Demographic: Outer metropolitan

The electoral district of Yuroke was an electoral district of the Victorian Legislative Assembly. It was situated in the outer northern suburbs of Melbourne and was created in a redistribution before the 2002 state election, replacing the former electorate of Tullamarine.

Included within its boundaries were Attwood, Craigieburn, Greenvale, Kalkallo, Mickleham and Yuroke, as well as parts of Roxburgh Park, Somerton, and Westmeadows.

It was considered to be a very safe Labor Party seat, and was held by the party for its entire existence.

The seat was abolished by the Electoral Boundaries Commission ahead of the 2022 election and replaced by the electoral districts of Kalkallo and Greenvale.

== Members for Yuroke ==
Member	Party	Term
Liz Beattie	Labor	2002–2014
Ros Spence	Labor	2014–2022

== Election results ==
2018 Victorian state election: Yuroke
Party	Candidate	Votes	%	±%
Labor	Ros Spence	28,519	59.42	+5.33
Liberal	Jim Overend	12,692	26.44	+2.83
Greens	Louise Sampson	3,070	6.40	+0.38
Independent	Golda Zogheib	2,102	4.38	+4.38
Victorian Socialists	Emma Dook	1,612	3.36	+3.36
Total formal votes		47,995	93.11	−0.39
Informal votes		3,549	6.89	+0.39
Turnout		51,544	88.76	−3.68
Two-party-preferred result
Labor	Ros Spence	33,730	70.26	+1.74
Liberal	Jim Overend	14,278	29.74	−1.74
Labor hold		Swing	+1.74	

== See also ==
- Parliaments of the Australian states and territories
- List of members of the Victorian Legislative Assembly
