= Electoral district of Kalkallo =

Kalkallo Victoria—Legislative Assembly
- Interactive map of electoral district boundaries from the 2022 state election
- State: Victoria
- Created: 2022
- MP: Ros Spence
- Party: Labor
- Namesake: Kalkallo
- Electors: 52,205 (2022)
- Area: 262 km^{2} (101.2 sq mi)
- Demographic: Urbanised rural

The Electoral district of Kalkallo is an electoral district of the Victorian Legislative Assembly in Australia. It was created in the redistribution of electoral boundaries in 2021, and came into effect at the 2022 Victorian state election.

It covers an area in the north western suburbs of Melbourne and outlying northern towns that was previously covered by the districts of Yuroke and Yan Yean. It includes the suburbs of Craigieburn, Mickleham, Kalkallo, and the towns of Beveridge and Wallan.

== Members for Kalkallo ==
Member	Party	Term
Ros Spence	Labor	2022–present

== Election results ==
2022 Victorian state election: Kalkallo
Party	Candidate	Votes	%	±%
Labor	Ros Spence	21,531	53.9	−5.7
Liberal	Bikram Singh	9,154	22.9	−2.4
Family First	Das Sayer	2,457	6.1	+6.1
Greens	Muhammad Nisar Ul Murtaza	2,116	5.3	−0.6
Victorian Socialists	Sergio Monsalve Tobon	1,938	4.8	+2.4
Animal Justice	Frances Lowe	1,466	3.7	+3.7
Independent	Jimmy George Parel	610	1.5	+1.5
New Democrats	Smiley Sandhu	409	1.0	+1.0
Independent	Callum John French	299	0.8	+0.8
Total formal votes		39,970	92.0	–0.6
Informal votes		3,504	8.0	+0.6
Turnout		43,474	83.3	+7.2
Two-party-preferred result
Labor	Ros Spence	26,561	66.5	−4.4
Liberal	Bikram Singh	13,409	33.5	+4.4
Labor hold		Swing	−4.4	

== See also ==
- Parliaments of the Australian states and territories
- List of members of the Victorian Legislative Assembly
