= Kos Samaras =

Greek-Australian political consultant

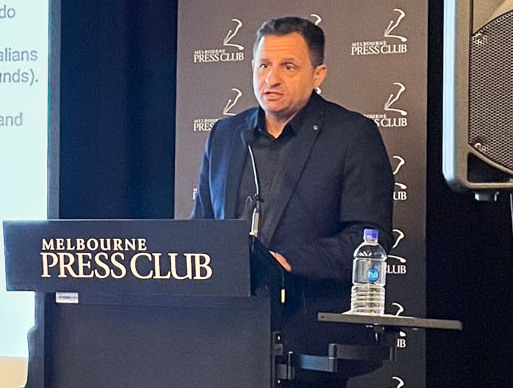
- Samaras in March 2024
- Born: 1970/1971 (age 55–56)
- Occupations: Lobbyist; Political consultant; Pollster; Campaign strategist
- Organisation: RedBridge

Kosmos Samaras (born 1970/1971) is an Australian lobbyist, pollster, and former Victorian Labor Party strategist. He helped run Labor's state election campaigns for 14 years before departing in 2019 to found RedBridge, a political consultancy firm and pollster, which has become influential in Victorian, and more broadly, Australian politics.

== Early life ==
Samaras's mother was an active member in the Communist Party of Greece during a time of political instability in the country. At the urging of her father, a fellow communist, she fled to Australia in 1966 and found work in a rope factory in Melbourne. She married a smelter, Samaras's father, but the two separated when Samaras was three years old.

Searching for somewhere with both affordable housing and work, the family moved suburbs from Northcote to Meadow Heights, where they lived in a housing commission property. In Meadow Heights, Samaras attended Bethal Primary School. Because of his mother's past activism in Greece, Samaras became interested in politics from an early age, distributing Labor's how-to-vote cards as a teenager.

== Career ==
Samaras worked in advertising once his schooling ended. When he was 25, he became an active Labor member, joining the party's Socialist Left faction. In his early years he rivalled with the future premier Daniel Andrews, despite their shared faction – the two were supporting the federal politicians Kim Carr and Alan Griffin respectively, aiming to further their affiliate's ministerial ambitions.

=== Labor strategist (2005–2019) ===
In 2005, Samaras became assistant secretary for the Victorian Labor Party, where he assisted in strategising and managing the party's state election campaigns. Though Samaras generally remained out of the public eye in this role, he garnered attention in 2014, several months before that year's state election, through his part in the "dictaphone affair". Farrah Tomazin, a journalist for The Age, had interviewed Ted Baillieu, a former Liberal premier, who made disparaging comments about his party colleagues. Tomazin taped the interview, but lost the recorder at the Labor state conference in May. The device was handed in to the conference's lost-and-found and taken back to party offices.

Samaras, according to his account, came across the recorder several days later and listened to its files. He was angered and surprised by one particular recording of himself in conversation with senior politicians – a conversation he had not known was recorded. He copied the recorder's complete contents and played a sample to two fellow senior officials: Noah Carroll, the party's state secretary, and John McLinden, then-Opposition Leader Andrews's chief of staff. After a discussion, the three agreed the recordings could not be distributed further. Samaras destroyed the recorder and its contents by cutting up its hard drive, and deleted all copies of its files.

The events came to light when the recording of the Baillieu interview leaked to Liberal Party members, causing political damage. Samaras apologised for destroying rather than returning the recorder but – along with Carroll and McLinden – denied responsibility for the leak. Andrews said no members of his staff had any involvement in distributing the recording and singled out Samaras for defence, calling him "a good and decent person who made the wrong call".

Premier Denis Napthine said Andrews' comments were implausible, remarking "if staff that were working for me had behaved in a similar manner, they would not be working for me in the future". Andrew Holden, The Age's editor-in-chief, thought the Labor officials involved had committed theft. Victoria's Office of Public Prosecutions investigated the case, but recommended no charges against Samaras.

At the 2014 state election, Samaras helped implement a new field campaigning strategy as Labor's marginal seats director. Under the strategy, which had been trialled in some seats at the 2013 federal election, Labor moved away from traditional mass television advertising and mail-outs as means of communicating with voters. Instead, the party relied on a network of 5000 volunteers to talk with friends and visit and telephone voters. Labor's communications were heavily targeted towards undecided voters, tailored towards their specific concerns, and used people in particular occupations to highlight negative impacts of Coalition government policy on their areas of work. For example, in Macedon, a marginal seat affected by bushfires, campaign staff identified "a particular type of voter" who would dislike the Coalition's cuts to the Country Fire Authority; these voters received a letter from a firefighter on the subject.

Notably, Labor eschewed endorsements from major state media, with both The Age and the Herald Sun endorsing their Coalition opponents. Samaras commented, "[W]ho gives a shit? They don't have the influence they once did." Labor would go on to win the election, unseating the Coalition after only one term in office for the first time in nearly sixty years in Victoria.

A low point in Samaras's career came in 2017: Labor's Clare Burns lost a state by-election in Northcote to Lidia Thorpe of the Greens, though Labor had held the seat since its creation in 1927. Samaras felt the loss particularly hard because the by-election had been triggered by the death of Fiona Richardson, the Labor incumbent. However, the "silver lining" for Samaras was the by-election's status as a "test drive" for what he considered the best moment in his Labor career: 2018, when he played a key part in engineering Andrews's large victory in that year's state election. He called the campaign "a body of work that took about eight years to develop" and "the product of a professional outfit that dedicated itself 100 per cent to winning elections".

Samaras began planning to move on from his Labor role in the same year, considering his position "all-consuming" and "extremely taxing on family life". He announced his departure in September 2019, though he would stay on until January to assist in transition. By the end of his tenure at Labor, Samaras had helped manage the party's campaigning in four state elections – 2006, 2010, 2014 and 2018 – and twelve by-elections. Of these, Labor had won three (2006, 2014 and 2018) and eleven respectively.

=== Lobbyist and pollster (2019–present) ===
Together with Simon Welsh, a Labor pollster, Samaras founded RedBridge in September 2019 after a year's planning. The firm provided lobbying, political consultancy and polling services, and quickly became prominent in Melbourne – Damon Johnston, writing for The Australian in 2023, dubbed Samaras "one of the most influential political and corporate fixers in a city overloaded with ex-political types who think they are fixers". By that time, RedBridge had registered 51 clients and ten former clients.

In December 2020, Voices of Kooyong canvassed Samaras for advice on their movement to install an independent candidate in the seat. He obliged, appearing on a videoconference in January to a sixty-person audience. Among them was Simon Holmes à Court of Climate 200, who followed up requesting Samaras analyse more broadly how independents could defeat Liberal MPs in safe seats. Samaras conducted further research and concluded a demographic shift towards young professional women and renters had left several "heartland" Liberal seats vulnerable to a "particular brand" of politics – "sort of centrist, socially progressive, on climate very progressive". RedBridge would conduct qualitative and quantitative research for these teal independents from September 2021 up until the 2022 federal election in May. Ultimately, six teals would win seats from Liberal incumbents, including Monique Ryan in Kooyong.

Even having left his role as assistant secretary, Samaras has remained involved in internal Labor politics. In November 2021, he attended a meeting at the Transport Workers Union, where representatives from Labor's Left and Right factions negotiated how upper and lower house electorates would be divided among the groups for the 2022 state election. Johnston named Samaras among a group of "faceless men" and argued "Labor-linked lobbyists who make a living lobbying a Labor government for private sector clients playing a role in determining the future of Labor MPs" raised ethical concerns. Samaras said he attended as a proxy for Carr and was not an official negotiator for any faction, and emphasised he complied with safeguards on lobbying activities, including registering his clients.

Samaras has also provided media commentary on Australian politics, particularly regarding polling, elections and referendums. This has included him writing opinion pieces approximately monthly for the Australian Financial Review since September 2024. For the 2025 federal election, Samaras was a panellist for ABC's live coverage, proving his commentary on results.

== Personal life ==
Samaras is married to Ros Spence, who held multiple ministerial positions in the Andrews government, and who is currently serving in the Allan cabinet. Commenting on the potential for conflicts of interest given his own role as a lobbyist, Samaras has said that "[he and Spence] have to show utmost caution" and mentioned "special arrangements" to avoid such conflicts.
