= Ros Spence =

Australian politician

The Honourable Ros Spence MP

Minister for Youth Justice
- Incumbent
- Assumed office 4 August 2026
- Premier: Ben Carroll
- Preceded by: Paul Hamer

Minister for Corrections
- Incumbent
- Assumed office 4 August 2026
- Premier: Ben Carroll
- Preceded by: Paul Hamer

Minister for Victim Support
- Incumbent
- Assumed office 4 August 2026
- Premier: Ben Carroll
- Preceded by: Anthony Carbines (as Minister for Victims)

Minister for Community Sport
- Incumbent
- Assumed office 23 March 2020
- Premier: Daniel Andrews; Jacinta Allan; Ben Carroll
- Preceded by: Gavin Jennings
Other ministerial offices
Minister for Roads and Road Safety
In office 15 April 2026 – 4 August 2026
Premier	Jacinta Allan
Preceded by	Melissa Horne
Succeeded by	Paul Hamer
Minister for First Peoples
In office 15 April 2026 – 4 August 2026
Premier	Jacinta Allan
Preceded by	Natalie Hutchins (as Minister for Treaty and First Peoples)
Succeeded by	Gabrielle Williams
Minister for Agriculture
In office 2 October 2023 – 15 April 2026
Premier	Jacinta Allan
Preceded by	Gayle Tierney
Succeeded by	Michaela Settle
Minister for Carers and Volunteers
In office 2 October 2023 – 15 April 2026
Premier	Jacinta Allan
Preceded by	Lizzie Blandthorn (as Minister for Disability, Ageing and Carers)
Succeeded by	Luba Grigorovitch
Minister for Prevention of Family Violence
In office 27 June 2022 – 2 October 2023
Premier	Daniel Andrews; Jacinta Allan
Preceded by	Gabrielle Williams
Succeeded by	Vicki Ward
Minister for Suburban Development
In office 5 December 2022 – 2 October 2023
Premier	Daniel AndrewsJacinta Allan
Preceded by	Melissa Horne
Succeeded by	Sonya Kilkenny (as Minister for the Suburbs)
Minister for Multicultural Affairs
In office 23 March 2020 – 5 December 2022
Premier	Daniel Andrews
Preceded by	Gavin Jennings
Succeeded by	Colin Brooks
Minister for Youth
In office 23 March 2020 – 5 December 2022
Premier	Daniel Andrews
Preceded by	Gavin Jennings
Succeeded by	Natalie Suleyman

Member of the Victorian Legislative Assembly for Kalkallo
- Incumbent
- Assumed office 26 November 2022
- Preceded by: Seat established

Member of the Victorian Legislative Assembly for Yuroke
- In office 29 November 2014 – 26 November 2022
- Preceded by: Liz Beattie
- Succeeded by: Seat abolished

Personal details
- Born: 16 December 1970 (age 55)
- Party: Labor
- Spouse: Kos Samaras
- Website: www.rosspence.com.au

Rosalind Louise Spence (born 16 December 1970) is an Australian politician. She has been a Labor Party member of the Victorian Legislative Assembly since November 2014, representing Yuroke from 2014 to 2022, then Kalkallo from 2022 onwards.

== Early life, education and career ==
Spence was raised in Eltham and graduated from Eltham High School in 1988. She later graduating with a Bachelor of Laws and a Bachelor of Arts from the University of Tasmania in 2002.

Prior to her election to Parliament, Spence worked as an electorate officer to various state and federal Members of Parliament, as operations manager for the Victorian branch of the Australian Labor Party, and as a volunteer solicitor at the Broadmeadows Legal Centre.

== Political career ==
From 2008 to 2012, Spence served as a Councillor in the City of Hume, including as Mayor between 2011 and 2012. In 2013, she was selected as the Labor candidate for the seat of Yuroke and was elected to the Victorian Legislative Assembly at the 2014 Victorian state election. She later re-elected at the 2018 Victorian state election. Following the abolition of the Yuroke electorate, Spence won the seat of Kalkallo at the 2022 Victorian state election.

Following her election, Spence served as Government Whip and later as Parliamentary Secretary for Public Transport and Parliamentary Secretary for Road Infrastructure. She has also served as the Chair of the Electoral Matters Committee.

In March 2020, Spence was elevated to the Second Andrews Ministry following the resignation of Gavin Jennings as the Minister for Multicultural Affairs, Community Sport and Youth. She was additionally appointed as Minister for Prevention of Family Violence in June 2022.

Following the 2022 election, Spence was sworn in as Minister for Prevention of Family Violence, Community Sport and Suburban Development.

Spence variously held the portfolios of Agriculture, Community Sport, First Peoples, Roads and Road Safety, and Carers and Volunteers in the Allan ministry, and serves as the Minister for Youth Justice, Corrections, Victims Support and Community Sport in the Carroll ministry.

=== Electoral history ===
Electoral history of Ros Spence in the Parliament of Victoria
Year	Electorate	Party	First Preference Result				Two Candidate Result			
Year	Electorate	Party	Votes	%	+%	Position	Votes	%	+%	Result
2014	Yuroke	Labor	20,484	54.1	−2.2	1st	25,839	68.5	+2.5	Elected
2018	Yuroke	Labor	28,519	59.42	+5.33	1st	33,730	70.26	+1.74	Elected
2022	Kalkallo	Labor	21,531	53.9	−5.7	1st	26,561	66.5	−4.4	Elected

== Personal life ==
Spence has one son and is married to former Victorian Labor assistant state secretary Kos Samaras.

Victorian Legislative Assembly
Preceded by Liz Beattie	Member for Yuroke; 2014–present	Incumbent
