= Fallon =

Fallon may refer to:

== Buildings ==
- Fallon Building, a landmark-designated commercial building in San Francisco, California
- Fallon Cottage Annex, a historic cure cottage in North Elba, New York, United States
- Fallon House, a heritage-listed trade union office in Bundaberg, Queensland, Australia

== Businesses and organizations ==
- The Fallon Company, an American commercial real estate owner and developer
- Fallon Health, an American health insurance provider
- Fallon Worldwide, an American advertising agency

== People ==
- Fallon (given name)
- Fallon (surname)

== Places ==
=== France ===
- Fallon, Haute-Saône

=== United States ===
- Fallon, California
- Fallon, Montana
  - Fallon County, Montana
- Fallon, Nevada
  - Fallon Indian Reservation
  - Fallon Municipal Airport
  - Fallon Range Training Complex
  - Naval Air Station Fallon
- Fallon Station, Nevada
- Fallon, North Dakota
- Fallon, Oklahoma
- Fallon, Roanoke, Virginia

== Other uses ==
- "Fallon" (Dynasty episode), a television episode
- Fallon (Jewel Riders), a cartoon character
- Fallon, a western novel by Louis L'Amour, in which the main character is named Fallon

== See also ==
- O'Fallon (disambiguation)
- Folan
