= Fallon (surname) =

Surname list

Fallon is an Irish surname and refers to the clan name Ó Fallamháin or Ó Fallúin.

The original Gaelic form of the name Fallon is O Fallamhain. The surname Fallon was first found in Galway (Irish: Gaillimh) part of the province of Connacht, located on the west coast of the island, where they held a family seat from very ancient times. The origin of the surname in Irish is "leader" or "granddaughter/grandson of a rich king." The Irish surname meaning "governor" or "supremacy". Some have maintained that Fallon was originally pronounced with an "a" as in "fall".

In Ireland, Fallon is exclusively a surname rather than a given name. Outside of Ireland, particularly in the United States, it is occasionally used as a gender-neutral given name.

Notable people with the surname include:

- BP Fallon, Irish DJ, author, photographer, and musician Bernard Patrick Fallon (born 1946)
- Brian Fallon (born 1980), American singer-songwriter and musician
- Brian Fallon (press secretary) (born 1982), American political activist
- Craig Fallon (1982–2019), British judoka
- Ed Fallon (born 1958), American politician and activist
- George Fallon (baseball) (1914–1994), American baseball player
- George Hyde Fallon (1902–1980), U.S. Congressman
- James H. Fallon (born 1947), American neuroscientist
- Jennifer Fallon (born 1959), Australian author
- Jim Fallon (football) (born 1950), Scottish footballer and coach
- Jim Fallon (rugby) (born 1965), English rugby player
- Jimmy Fallon (born 1974), American actor, comedian, and television host
- John Fallon (disambiguation)
- Jonathan Fallon, rugby player
- Kevin Fallon (born 1948), English-New Zealand soccer coach
- Kieren Fallon (born 1965), Irish jockey
- Lucy Fallon (born 1995), English actress
- Matt Fallon (born 1965), American singer
- Michael Fallon (born 1952), British politician
- Neil Fallon (born 1971), American singer
- Órla Fallon (born 1974), Irish singer and songwriter
- Pat Fallon (born 1967), American businessman and politician
- Richard Fallon (disambiguation)
- Rory Fallon (born 1982), New Zealand footballer
- Stephen M. Fallon, American literary scholar
- Steve Fallon (footballer) (born 1956), English former footballer
- Steven Fallon (born 1979), Scottish retired footballer
- Sean Fallon (disambiguation)
- Siobhan Fallon Hogan (born 1961), American actress and comedian
- Tiffany Fallon (born 1974), American model
- Thomas Fallon, mayor of San Jose, California
- William J. Fallon (born 1944), U.S. Navy admiral

== See also ==
- Falloon, surname
