= John Fallon =

John Fallon may refer to:

- John Fallon (businessman) (born 1962), CEO of Pearson PLC
- John Fallon (footballer) (1940–2025), Scottish footballer
- John Fallon (golfer) (1913–1985), Scottish golfer
- John A. Fallon, former president of Eastern Michigan University
- John Fallon Colohan (1862–1932), Ireland's first motorist
- John Fallon, discoverer in 1875 of gold in Telluride, Colorado, putting it on the map
- John Fallon, 1911 United States amateur boxing champion
- John Fallon, priest at Holy Spirit Catholic Regional School
- John Fallon, actor who appeared in the 1981 horror film Final Exam
- John Fallon (photographer), American surrealist photographer and filmmaker

== See also ==
- John Fallon Field, Albany, New York
- John Fallon Drive, Cranmore, Sligo, Ireland
- John Falloon, New Zealand politician
