= O'Fallon =

O'Fallon may refer to:

== People ==
- Caroline Schutz O'Fallon (1804-1898), American benefactor and philanthropist
- James O'Fallon (bef 1756–1786), Irish Roman Catholic clergyman
- John O'Fallon (1786–1865), American businessman, philanthropist, and military officer
- Peter O'Fallon, American television director

== Places ==
- O'Fallon, Illinois, United States
- O'Fallon Township, St. Clair County, Illinois, United States
- O'Fallon, Missouri, United States
  - O'Fallon Park
- O'Fallon, St. Louis, a neighborhood in the city of St. Louis, Missouri, United States
  - O'Fallon Street (St. Louis)

== See also ==
- O'Fallons, Nebraska, United States
- Fallon (disambiguation)
