= Baker v. Nelson =

1971 Minnesota Supreme Court case on same-sex marriage

- Court: Minnesota Supreme Court
- Full case name: Richard John Baker et al., Appellants, v. Gerald Nelson, Clerk of District Court, Fourth Judicial District, in Hennepin County, Respondent
- Decided: October 15, 1971
- Citation: 291 Minn. 310, 191 N.W.2d 185 (1971)

Case history
- Prior action: Plaintiff's claim dismissed
- Appealed from: Hennepin County

Holding
- OPINION: Denial of the statutory entitlement demanded by gay citizens to marry the adult of one's choice "does not offend the . . . United States Constitution".

Court membership
- Chief judge: Oscar Knutson

Case opinions
- Decision by: C. Donald Peterson
- Majority: unanimous
- Concurrence: Martin A. Nelson, William P. Murphy, James C. Otis, Walter F. Rogosheske, Fallon Kelly

Laws applied
- Minn.St. c. 517; U.S. Const. amends I, VIII, IX and XIV
- Overruled by
- Obergefell v. Hodges (2015)

Keywords
- Same-sex marriage

Richard John Baker v. Gerald R. Nelson, 291 Minn. 310, 191 N.W.2d 185 (1971), was a case in which the Minnesota Supreme Court decided that construing a marriage statute to restrict marriage licenses to persons of the opposite sex "does not offend" the United States Constitution. Baker appealed the decision, and on October 10, 1972, the U.S. Supreme Court dismissed the appeal "for want of a substantial federal question".

Because the case came to the Supreme Court through mandatory appellate review (not certiorari), the dismissal constituted a decision on the merits and established Baker v. Nelson as precedent, although the extent of its precedential effect had been subject to debate. In May 2013, Minnesota legalized same-sex marriage and it took effect on August 1, 2013. On June 26, 2015, the Supreme Court explicitly overruled Baker in Obergefell v. Hodges.

== Facts and trial ==
On 18 May 1970, activists James Michael McConnell, librarian, and Richard John Baker, law student on the Minneapolis campus of the University of Minnesota, applied for a marriage license in Minneapolis. Gerald Nelson, Clerk of District Court in Hennepin County, denied the request on the sole ground that the two were of the same sex. The couple filed suit in district court to force Nelson to issue the license.

The couple first contended that their request for a marriage license was not forbidden. If the court were to construe the statutes to require different-sex couples, however, Baker claimed such a reading would violate several provisions of the U.S. Constitution:

- First Amendment (freedom of speech and of association),
- Eighth Amendment (cruel and unusual punishment),
- Ninth Amendment (unenumerated right to privacy), and
- Fourteenth Amendment (fundamental right to marry under the Due Process Clause and sex discrimination contrary to the Equal Protection Clause).

The trial court dismissed the couple's claims and ordered Nelson not to issue the license.

== Appeal to the Minnesota Supreme Court ==
The couple appealed the district court's decision to the Minnesota Supreme Court. The Court heard oral argument in the case on September 21, 1971. During the oral argument, while Baker and McConnell's lawyer was presenting his case, Justice Fallon Kelly turned his chair around, thus literally turning his back on the attorney. The justices did not ask a single question during the oral argument to Baker and McConnell's lawyer or to the assistant county attorney who represented the clerk.

In a brief opinion issued on October 15, 1971, authored by Justice C. Donald Peterson, the Minnesota Supreme Court unanimously affirmed the trial court's dismissal. Based on the common usage of the term "marriage" and gender-specific references elsewhere in the same chapter, the Court held that the statutes prohibited marriage between persons of the same sex. This restriction, the Court reasoned, did not offend the Due Process Clause because procreation and child rearing were central to the constitutional protection given to marriage.

With respect to the claim of an equal-protection violation, the Court found that childless marriages presented no more than a theoretical imperfection in the state's rationale for limiting marriage to different-sex couples. It found the plaintiffs' reliance on the U.S. Supreme Court's recent decision in Loving v. Virginia, finding an anti-miscegenation law unconstitutional, failed to provide a parallel: "in commonsense and in a constitutional sense, there is a clear distinction between a marital restriction based merely upon race and one based upon the fundamental difference in sex."

The Court acknowledged that Justice Goldberg's concurrence in Griswold v. Connecticut, which argued that criminalizing the possession of contraceptives violated the right to marital privacy, found support for marital privacy partly in the Ninth Amendment, but the Court distinguished Griswold and found no authority for the Ninth Amendment being binding on the states. The Court dismissed the plaintiffs' claims under the First and Eighth Amendments without discussion.

== Appeal to the U.S. Supreme Court ==
Baker and McConnell appealed the Minnesota court's opinion to the U.S. Supreme Court. There, they claimed that the marriage statute, as construed, implicated three rights: it abridged their fundamental right to marry under the Due Process Clause of the Fourteenth Amendment; discriminated based on gender, contrary to the Equal Protection Clause of the Fourteenth Amendment; and deprived them of privacy rights flowing from the Ninth Amendment to the United States Constitution.

In his "Motion to Dismiss Appeal and Brief", the Hennepin County Attorney argued that the marriage license issued previously made this case moot. On October 10, 1972, the U.S. Supreme Court responded with a one-sentence order: "The appeal is dismissed for want of a substantial federal question."

In most cases presented to the U.S. Supreme Court, the Court's refusal to hear the case is not an endorsement of the decision below. However, since this case came to the Court through mandatory appellate review, (Note: The U.S. Supreme Court was required to accept the appeal as a matter of right, a practice that the Supreme Court Case Selections Act ended in 1988.) the summary dismissal is a decision on the merits of the case. As binding precedent, Baker prevented lower courts from coming to a contrary conclusion when presented with the precise issue the Court adjudicated in dismissing the case.

The "moot" question suggested that perhaps the "precise issue" was not the right of citizens to marry the adult of one's choice.

== Application of the Baker precedent ==
When dealing with precedents like Baker, lower courts may have to guess at the meaning of these unexplained decisions. The Supreme Court has laid out rules, however, to guide lower courts in narrowly applying these summary dispositions:

- The facts in the potentially binding case must not bear any legally significant differences to the case under consideration.
- The binding precedent encompasses only the issues presented to the Court, not the reasoning found in the lower court's decision.
- Of the issues presented, only those necessarily decided by the Court in dismissing the case control.
- Subsequent developments by the Court on the relevant doctrines may cast doubt on the continuing validity of a summary judgment.

In recent years, most judges faced with claims like those in Baker have concluded that subsequent developments render Baker no longer authoritative. During the 2013 oral argument in Hollingsworth v. Perry, U.S. Supreme Court Associate Justice Ruth Bader Ginsburg summarized her view of Baker: "The Supreme Court hadn't even decided that gender-based classifications get any kind of heightened scrutiny. And the same-sex intimate conduct was considered criminal in many states in 1971, so I don't think we can extract much in Baker v. Nelson."

Following the Supreme Court's ruling in June 2013 in United States v. Windsor that found unconstitutional the provision of the Defense of Marriage Act that forbade federal government recognition of same-sex marriages, no U.S. Court of Appeals held that Baker controlled in a case challenging a state ban on same-sex marriage, until November 6, 2014, when the Sixth Circuit Court of Appeals ruled that Baker precluded it from considering several such cases from Kentucky, Michigan, Ohio, and Tennessee. The author of the opinion, Judge Jeffrey Sutton, argued that Windsor in no way contradicted Baker: "Windsor invalidated a federal law that refused to respect state laws permitting gay marriage, while Baker upheld the right of the people of a State to define marriage as they see it." He wrote in DeBoer v. Snyder that:

It matters not whether we think the decision [in Baker] was right in its time, remains right today, or will be followed by the Court in the future. Only the Supreme Court may overrule its own precedents, and we remain bound even by its summary decisions.... The Court has yet to inform us that we are not, and we have no license to engage in a guessing game about whether the Court will change its mind or, more aggressively, to assume authority to overrule Baker ourselves.

Conversely, Judge Martha Craig Daughtrey dissented from the court's decision that Baker was binding precedent. She wrote:

And although the argument [Baker precedent] was vigorously pressed by the DOMA proponents in their Supreme Court brief in Windsor neither Justice Kennedy in his opinion for the court nor any of the four dissenting judges in their three separate opinions mentioned Baker.

The precedential value of Baker was the subject of ongoing disputes in some other circuits. In the First Circuit, an October 2014 district court decision rejected a similar challenge to Puerto Rico's ban on same-sex marriage and said the First Circuit had "expressly acknowledged–a mere two years ago–that Baker remains binding precedent" in Massachusetts v. United States Department of Health and Human Services. There were also dissenting opinions from the U.S. Courts of Appeal for the Fourth and Tenth Circuits in 2014 that found Baker controlling.

=== Obergefell v. Hodges ===
On June 26, 2015, the U.S. Supreme Court overruled Baker in Obergefell v. Hodges. In that decision, Justice Anthony Kennedy wrote:

The Court now holds that same-sex couples may exercise the fundamental right to marry. No longer may this liberty be denied to them. Baker v. Nelson must be and now is overruled, and the State laws challenged by Petitioners in these cases are now held invalid to the extent they exclude same-sex couples from civil marriage on the same terms and conditions as opposite-sex couples.

== Plaintiffs ==
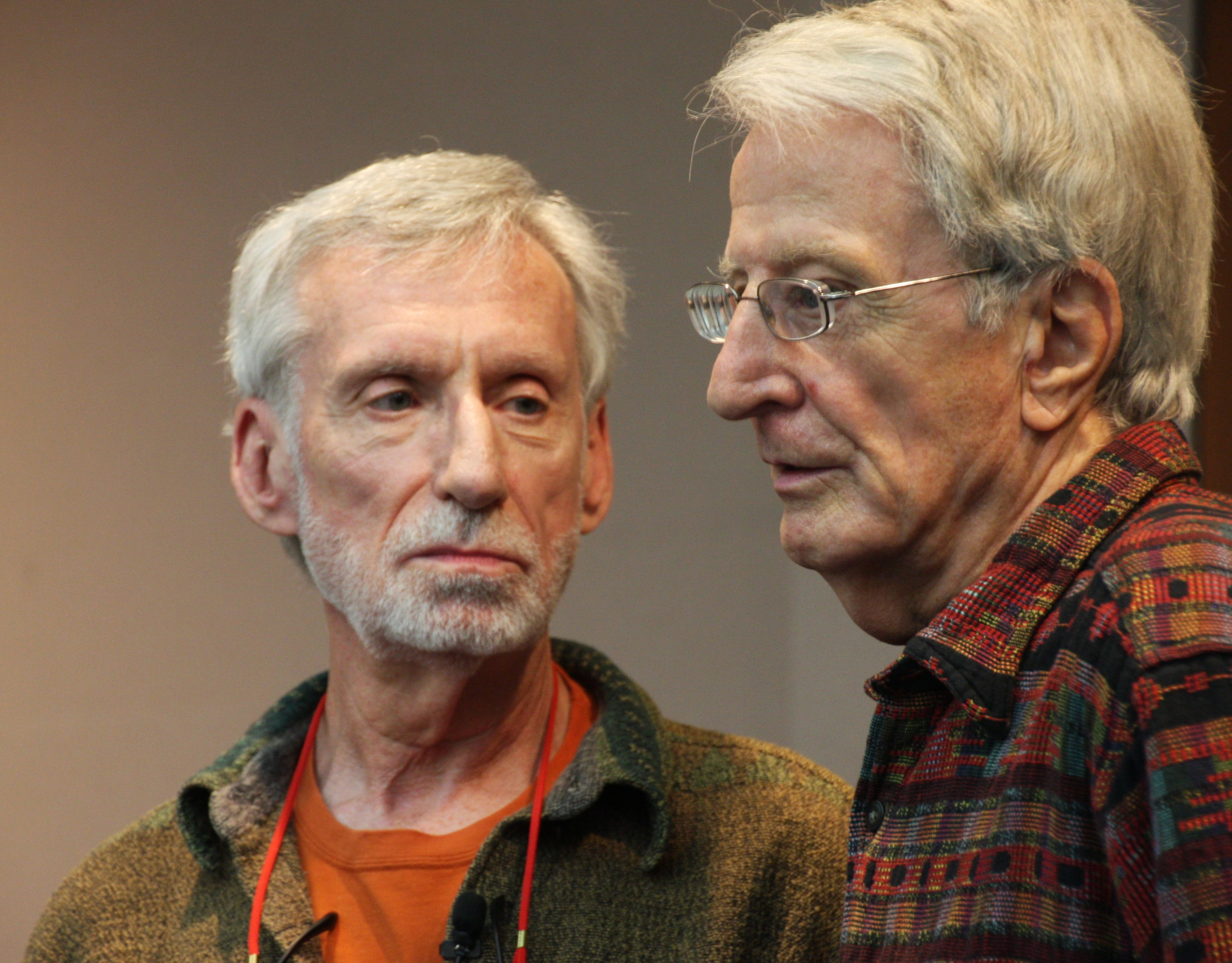
Mike McConnell and Jack Baker (r), seen here in 2016

During the pendency of the case, the plaintiffs Michael McConnell and Jack Baker obtained a license in Blue Earth County, Minnesota, and returned to Minneapolis to be married on 3 September 1971 by a minister from the Hennepin Avenue United Methodist Church.

As of May 2015, both were retired and living as a couple in Minneapolis. In a 2016 interview, Baker revealed that some legal battles were still on-going. In 2018, Assistant Chief Judge Gregory Anderson ruled that "The marriage is declared to be in all respects valid."

== See also ==
- List of United States Supreme Court cases, volume 409
- List of LGBT-related cases in the United States Supreme Court
