= Fallone =

Fallone is a surname. Notable people with the surname include:

- Michael Fallone (born 1938), Scottish chess player
- Steve Fallone (fl. early 21st century), American mastering engineer

== See also ==
- Fallon (surname), another surname
- Falloon, another surname
