= John Colohan =

John Colohan may refer to:

- John Colahan (1836–?), Surgeon Major General in the British Army
- John Fallon Colohan, Ireland's first motorist
