= Cranmore =

Cranmore may refer to:

- Cranmore, Somerset, a village in England
- Cranmore railway station, the main railway station on the East Somerset Railway
- Cranmore, Isle of Wight, a village on the Isle of Wight, England
- Cranmore Mountain Resort, a ski resort in North Conway, New Hampshire, USA
- Cranmore, Sligo, a large local authority housing development in Ireland
