= Maryville Academy =

Coordinates: 42.0669°N 87.8975°W

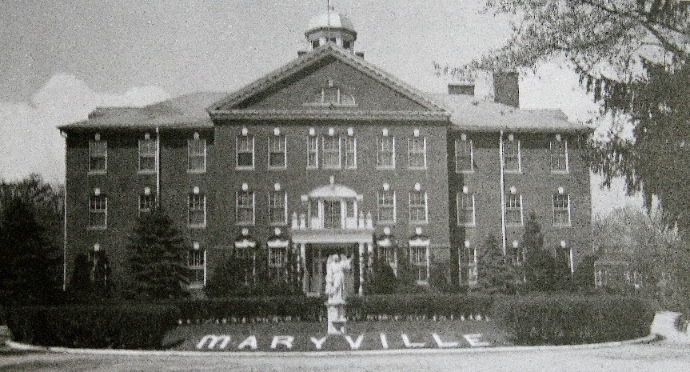
Maryville Academy's original building as it appeared c. 1951. At the time of this photograph, this building was used for administrative purposes and included an infirmary for sick residents.

Maryville Academy is a child care organization rooted in Catholic teaching. Located in Des Plaines, Illinois, Maryville was founded in 1883.

== History ==
Originally known as St. Mary's Training School for Boys, the facility was the vision of Chicago archbishop Patrick A. Feehan and served as an orphanage for many decades. Following a rebuild after a massive fire in 1899, St. Mary's new director, Reverend James Doran, opened the facility to girls in an effort to reunite orphaned brothers and sisters. Separate dormitories were built to accommodate this change.

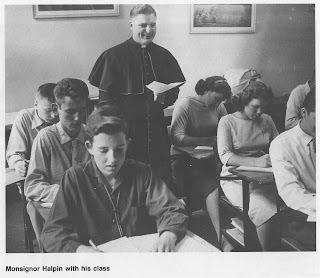
Monsignor Halpin with his class, including Jack Baker as a 15-year-old orphan and student, 1957

Renamed Maryville Academy in 1950, the shift from orphanage to a facility for children who experienced trauma was gradual, over a period of approximately 25 years and starting shortly after the close of World War II, a time when many orphanages in the United States transitioned to being boarding schools. Under Monsignor George Halpin's leadership, who directed Maryville from 1954 to 1970, the original massive dormitories were razed and replaced by more modern structures, a change that reflected the declining population of Maryville at the time. At around this time, Maryville began facing significant operating deficits and was threatened with closure.

The appointment in 1970 of Father John P. Smyth, a former all-American basketball player at the University of Notre Dame, as director was significant, as he overhauled the way Maryville was managed, reducing costs and changing the facility to a more home-like setting that was conducive to the facility's newly acquired role as a home for children who experienced trauma and neglect. Smyth presided over Maryville until 2004.

Shortly before the end of Smyth's tenure, Maryville was adversely affected by a resident's suicide, reports of physical and sexual assaults among residents, and charges of poor accounting. Subsequently, the State of Illinois removed residents from the facility, a move which almost resulted in Maryville being permanently closed.

Following the appointment of Sister Catherine Ryan as executive director in 2004, sweeping changes were made in how residents were cared for, and in 2007, the state returned residents to Maryville.

Pete Townshend became involved with the academy and, between 1997 and 2002, he played five benefit shows, raising at least $1,600,000. His 1998 album A Benefit for Maryville Academy was produced to support the activities of the academy.

== Current activities ==
Maryville operates six service areas, with campuses in Bartlett, Chicago, and Des Plaines. Maryville also operates Charles H. Walsh Sr. Academy and Career Tech High School, commonly known as Walsh Academy, in Niles, Illinois. Walsh Academy is a high school for students with special needs.

== Notable alumni ==
- Jack Baker, gay rights activist and pioneer of same-sex civil marriage
