= Jack Baker and Michael McConnell =

Married advocates of marriage rights for gay couples

Jack Baker
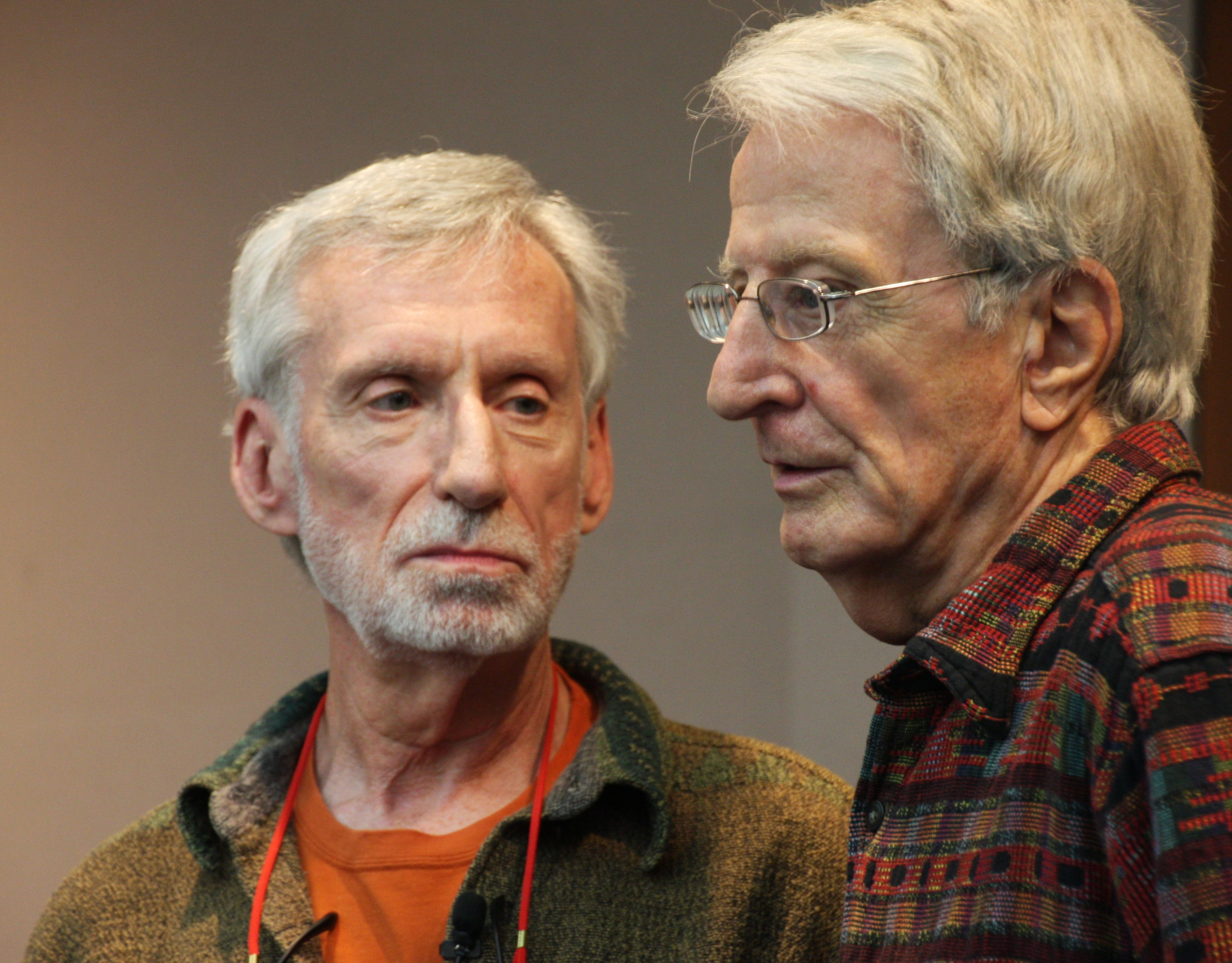
- McConnell and Baker in 2016
- Born: Richard John Baker; March 10, 1942 (age 84); Chicago, Illinois, U.S.
- Other name: Pat Lyn McConnell
- Education: University of Minnesota Law School (1972); Oklahoma City University (1968); University of Oklahoma (1965); Maryville Academy (1959)
- Known for: First same-sex couple to receive a valid marriage license and marriage certificate.
- Spouse: Michael McConnell (m. 1971)

Richard John Baker and James Michael McConnell are American LGBTQ rights activists, known for being the first legally married same-sex couple in recorded history. Married in Minneapolis, Minnesota, on September 3, 1971, they had legally obtained a marriage license and a marriage certificate yet their marriage was unrecognized and unrecorded by both state and federal entities until Sept 2018, when a state court upheld their license and certificate as valid.

== Synopsis ==
The couple met in 1966. On March 10, 1967 – Baker's 25th birthday – McConnell agreed to be "his lover" but only if it meant "a commitment ... for the long haul", living openly as a married couple. Jack agreed to find a way to make it happen by abandoning his engineering career and attending any law school that would accept his application.

Baker began pursuing his promise to obtain a legal right to marry before he enrolled as a law student in late 1969. He and McConnell, a librarian, became gay rights activists in Minnesota from 1969 to 1980.

Michael McConnell
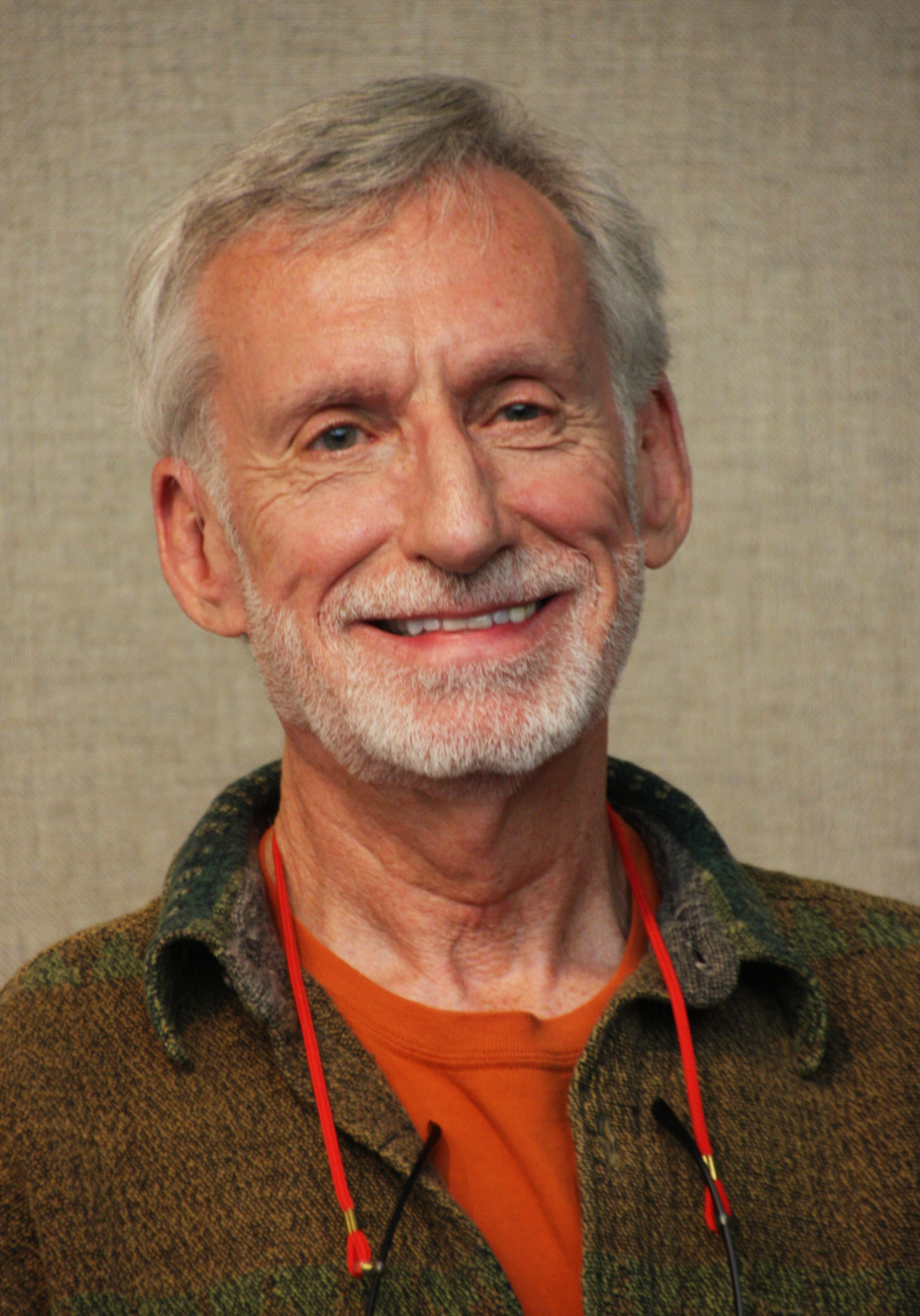
- McConnell in 2016
- Born: James Michael McConnell; May 19, 1942 (age 84); Norman, Oklahoma, U.S.
- Education: University of Oklahoma (1968); Norman High School (1960)
- Spouse: Jack Baker (m. 1971)

On May 22, 1970, when Baker and McConnell applied for a marriage license, the Clerk of District Court in Hennepin County refused to issue it to them, based on the recommendation of the County Attorney, who opined that allowing the marriage could "result in an undermining and destruction of the entire legal concept of our family structure in all areas of law". After being refused they filed a "motion for the issuance of a writ of mandamus to require ... the Clerk ... to issue a marriage license ..." Denial in the lower court was affirmed by the Minnesota Supreme Court on October 15, 1971, in Baker v. Nelson, noting that even though the parties were not "prohibited" by the marriage law to claim the benefits of "contract", a "sensible reading" of the statute "does not authorize" marriage between persons of the same sex. However, before the final opinion was published, McConnell re-applied in a different county.

After being refused in their first attempt to obtain a marriage license in Hennepin County, Michael McConnell adopted Baker on August 3, 1971. Baker changed his legal name to Pat Lyn McConnell, although he continued to use "Jack Baker" as his political persona. Now with a gender-neutral name, McConnell applied for a marriage license in Blue Earth County on August 9, 1971, which was issued in Mankato on August 16, 1971 while the couple was visiting friends. Rev. Roger Lynn, a United Methodist minister from the Hennepin Avenue United Methodist Church, validated the marriage contract on September 3, 1971, at a private home in Minneapolis. The Hennepin County Attorney convened a grand jury to investigate if Rev. Lynn had committed a crime but soon realized that some jurors found the legality of this marriage not worth pursuing. "Thus the marriage remained in effect."

Initial reactions were not favorable. An appeal (Note: The U.S. Supreme Court was required to accept an appeal of a state court's opinion as a matter of right, a practice that the Supreme Court Case Selections Act ended in 1988 (Public Law 100-352, 100th Congress).) to the U.S. Supreme Court, sponsored by the Minnesota Civil Liberties Union, was dismissed (Note: 409 U.S. 810, 93 S.Ct. 37, 34 L.Ed.2d 65 (1972)) "for want of a substantial federal question". on October 10, 1972, after the justices learned that the couple had previously obtained a marriage license in a different county on August 16, 1971 – long before the appeal was filed in October 1971. The clerk who gave them that license had not realized that both members of the couple were men, since Baker had changed his legal given name to "Pat Lyn", a name that is not obviously male. Upon discovering the error, the clerk did not officially record the issuing of the license, and that marriage remained unrecorded and unrecognized by both state and federal entities until its validity was affirmed on September 18, 2018, by a judge in Blue Earth County, who declared "The [1971] marriage ... to be in all respects valid" and ordered the Clerk of Court to record it. Since the marriage had never been declared nullified, it was ruled to have been valid for its entire duration.

The Family Law Reporter argued that the Minnesota Supreme Court in Baker v. Nelson could not annul a marriage contract that was validated "a full six weeks" before its decision was filed. Baker and McConnell (and others) assumed correctly that a dismissal of the Hennepin County case by either the state supreme court or the U.S. Supreme Court in October 1971 did not affect the validity of their marriage license issued by Blue Earth County. Professor Thomas Kraemer insisted that FREE had hosted "the first same-sex couple in history to be legally married".

After the wedding ceremony was completed on September 3, 1971, they were often invited to appear and speak at colleges, schools, businesses and churches in the U.S. and Canada. Their joint tax return for 1973 was rejected by the Internal Revenue Service. Even though filing separately would have actually saved them US$309 (equivalent to $2,241 in 2025), they refused to claim the refund. Similarly, the Veterans Administration rejected McConnell's request for spousal benefits. After that, McConnell changed his tactic and listed Baker as an adopted "dependent" on his tax returns, for which he received a deduction as head of household from 1974 through 2004. That benefit ended when Congress limited the deduction to the "age of 19" for an individual who is not a "full-time student".

In 2003, Baker and McConnell amended their individual tax returns for the year 2000, filing jointly as a couple, offering proof of a valid marriage license from Blue Earth County. The IRS challenged the validity of the marriage and argued that, even if the license were valid, the Defense of Marriage Act prohibited the IRS from recognizing it. When McConnell brought suit, the U.S. District Court for Minnesota upheld the IRS ruling and the Eighth Circuit Court of Appeals affirmed, saying that McConnell could not re-litigate a question decided previously.

Their marriage was not recorded or recognized as legal by the local government, various courts, the IRS, the Veterans Administration or the Social Security Administration until a state district court in Blue Earth County affirmed its legality on September 18, 2018, after concluding that the Minnesota Supreme Court had not "dissolved or annulled" the license obtained successfully from Blue Earth County.

Even before they succeeded in obtaining legal recognition, their marriage was characterized in 2013 as having been lawful and included by Time in a listicle of "The 25 Most Influential Marriages of All Time" in 2015. The legality of gay marriage has since become accepted, following a 2015 U.S. Supreme Court decision allowing it.

== Early years ==
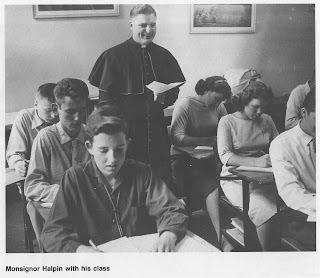
Source: The Voice of Maryville (1957). At age 15 (left, rear), he was known as Richard "Dick" Baker.

Baker was born in Chicago on March 10, 1942. While in kindergarten, his teacher described him as "very bright". His sick mother died when he was four years old, and his father, a devout Catholic and an Assistant Sales Manager within the Engineering Department of the Chicago Elevated Railway, also died following "complications from surgery" shortly before his sixth birthday. The State of Illinois, Department of Public Welfare, Child Welfare Services, took custody of him and the three other children (out of ten total) who were now living separately with siblings on September 4, 1948, and delivered him to Maryville Academy (then known as "St. Mary's Training School") in Des Plaines, Illinois, where he was accepted as a boarder to receive Catholic schooling. He remained in its care and custody for almost 11 years, completing grades 2–12 [High School].

While on active duty (four years) in the U.S. Air Force, Baker was accepted in the Airmen Education Commissioning Program and stationed at University of Oklahoma, where he earned a Bachelor of Science degree in Industrial Engineering. Upon graduation, he completed the remainder of his military service commitment in Florida, at which time the U.S. Air Force provided the ticket needed to return to his home base in Norman, Oklahoma, where he met McConnell. An invitation to hang out together led McConnell to agree, reluctantly, to form a serious relationship. A year and a half later, in May 1968, Baker received a master's degree in Business Administration from Oklahoma City University.

James Michael McConnell, born in Norman, Oklahoma, on May 19, 1942, was raised in a loving Methodist and Baptist family of small business owners, farmers and ranchers. He attended Lincoln elementary school (grades 1-6), Norman Junior High School (7-9) and Norman High School (1960) before studying for a degree in Pharmacy at the University of Oklahoma (OU) and the University of Kansas (KU). After a year of study at KU, he worked as a clerk in the West Bloomfield Township Public Library in suburban Detroit and returned to the University of Oklahoma (1965), where he completed his Bachelor of Arts in Library Science with a minor in Pharmacy (1967) and a Master of Library Science degree from the OU Graduate School of Library Science (1968).

=== Employment discrimination at the University of Minnesota ===
In 1970, the University Librarian invited Michael McConnell to head the Cataloging Division on the university's St. Paul campus. The board of regents refused to approve the offer after McConnell applied for a marriage license, and regent Daniel Gainey asserted that "homosexuality is about the worst thing there is."

McConnell sued and prevailed in federal District Court. The board appealed to the Eighth Circuit Court of Appeals, which agreed with the university that it had not restricted free speech. Instead, it ruled that McConnell was to blame for wanting to implement his "controversial ideas" and foist tacit approval of his "socially repugnant concept" on his employer. More than 80% of University of Minnesota students disagreed with the regents' behavior.

Hennepin County Library hired McConnell. After 37 years of service, McConnell retired as a Coordinating Librarian.

In 2012, University of Minnesota president Eric Kaler offered McConnell a personal apology for the "reprehensible" treatment endured from the board of regents in 1970. McConnell accepted his assurances and agreed to join the Heritage Society of the President's Club.

== Same-sex marriage activism ==
The marriage equality movement that emerged from the University of Minnesota attracted extensive media attention, including appearances on the Phil Donahue Show; and the David Susskind Show. The movement was widely criticized, while admiration among peers spread locally.

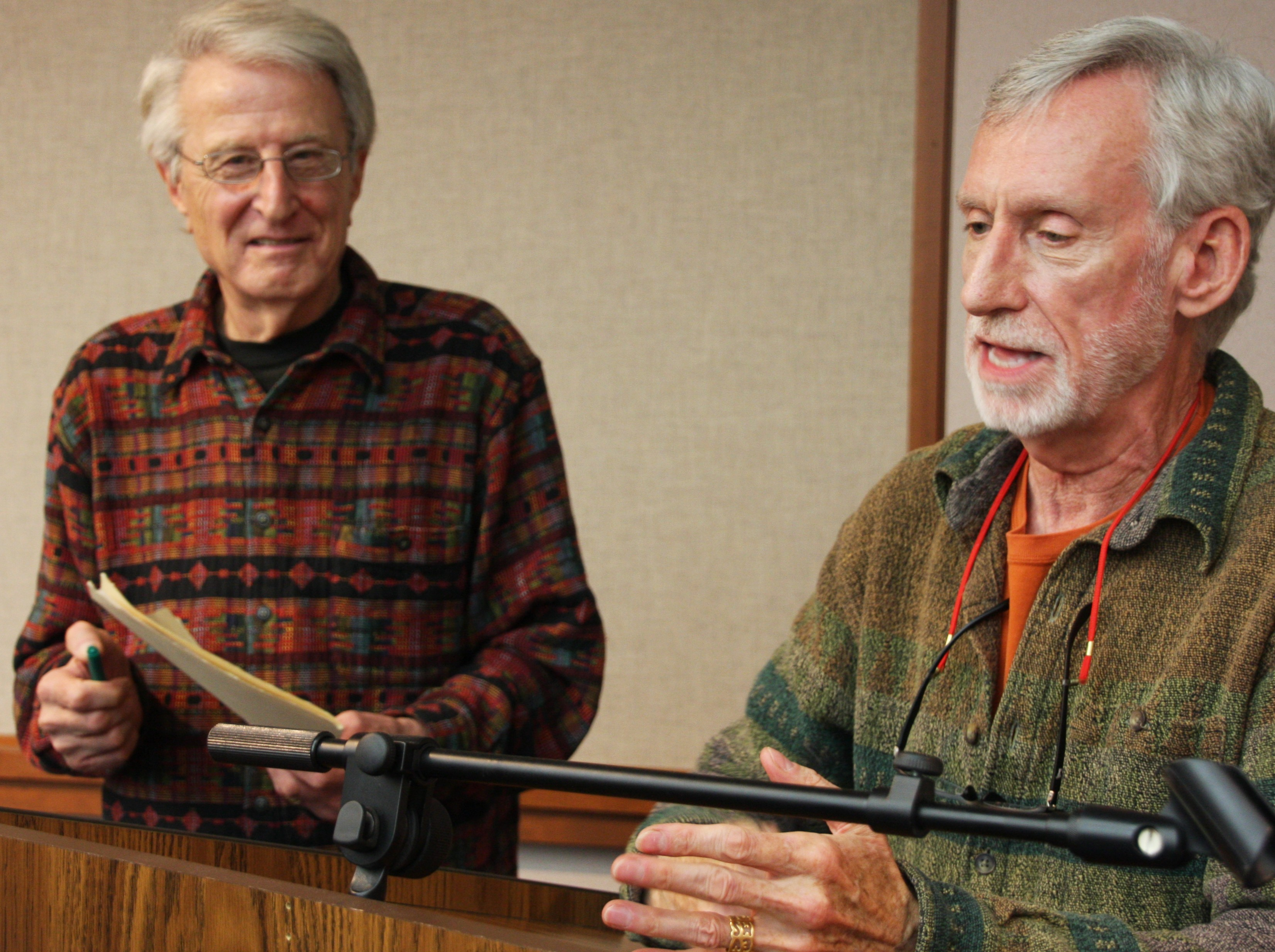
Baker, McConnell (2016)

Though the appeal to the U.S. Supreme Court was dismissed in 1972, other challenges followed as they pursued affirmation of their union while living openly as a married couple. In 1972, Baker led the Gay Rights Caucus at the state convention of the Minnesota Democratic–Farmer–Labor Party. The caucus persuaded delegates to endorse "legislation defining marriage as a civil contract between any two adults". That vote became the "first known case" of support by a major United States political party for same-sex marriage.

In 2015, the U.S. Supreme Court ruled that same-sex couples had a constitutional right to marry under the 14th Amendment of the Constitution in Obergefell v. Hodges, overturning Baker v. Nelson. The Attorney General of Minnesota submitted an amicus brief agreeing that the Minnesota Supreme Court's prior "procreation rationale" did not support its prohibition of same-sex marriage.

=== FREE activists ===
In 1969, weeks before the Stonewall riots in New York City, Koreen Phelps recruited local friends to join her outreach program sponsored by Minnesota Free University. Robert Halfhill, a graduate student who attended her lecture, wanted more than "just a social organization". He left, determined to organize a team of gay activists on the Minneapolis campus of the University of Minnesota.

Jack Baker, then a law student and "benevolent dictator", was elected to serve as president. Moving aggressively and openly, FREE played a significant role in making Minneapolis a prominent center for the LGBTQ+ community with members soon endorsing McConnell's dream of same-sex marriage and assisting activists "to gain visibility and legitimacy" at the University of Kansas, Lawrence.

When a faculty committee qualified the members of FREE to receive all privileges enjoyed by other student groups, it became "the first student gay organization to gain recognition in the upper mid-west." Its "leaders [believed] it to be the first such organization on a Big Ten campus", and the second such organization in the United States, following the Student Homophile League recognized by Columbia University in 1967.

One member asked five major companies with local offices to explain their attitudes toward gay men and women. Three responded quickly, insisting that they did not discriminate against gay people in their hiring policies. Honeywell objected to hiring "a known homosexual". Later in the decade, when faced with a denial of access to students, Honeywell reversed its hiring policy.

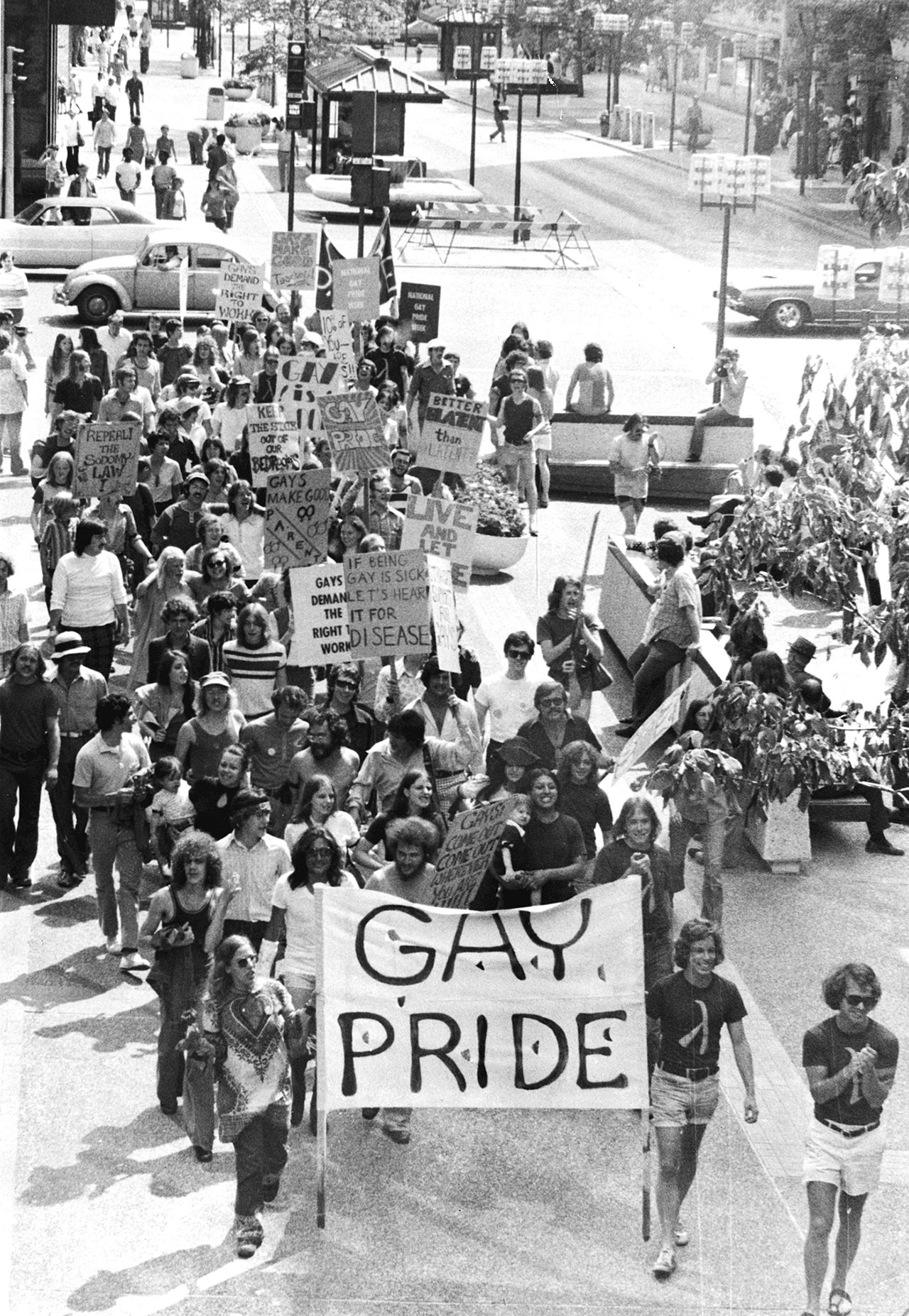
Photos by Jim Chalgren (June 1973) led to an expanding collection of "Gay Pride" events beyond Minneapolis.

In 1971, Baker campaigned to become president of the Minnesota Student Association at the University of Minnesota. Once elected, he hired Gail Karwoski as his communications director and, one year later, won re-election. The regents consented to his campaign promise and invited one student to sit with each committee as a non-voting member. That practice proved to be popular and became policy. That same year, Baker became chair of the Target City Coalition, parent corporation for The Gay Pride Committee, which sponsored the Festival of Pride each June. These celebrations were some of the earliest queer pride events in the United States.

Members of FREE from Gay House invited friends to meet in Loring Park, picnic and join the parade into Downtown Minneapolis. These events, which encouraged queer pride, began in mid-June as a prelude to local celebrations of Independence Day. Thom Higgins, Prime Archon of the Church of the Chosen People, crafted Gay Pride for the banner that would lead the crowd as it encouraged allies, supporters and bystanders to embarrass Leo Christopher Byrne, the Catholic archbishop of Saint Paul and Minneapolis, for his public opposition to homosexuality.

In 1973, FREE continued working with University of Minnesota faculty to protect gay students from discrimination. Central Administration approved the final draft of a new policy in 1972 and the Campus Committee on Placement Services began accepting complaints of unequal treatment by employers recruiting on campus. A member of FREE received class credit for documenting his youth and why he supported America's first gay marriage.

=== Same-sex marriage as a civil right ===
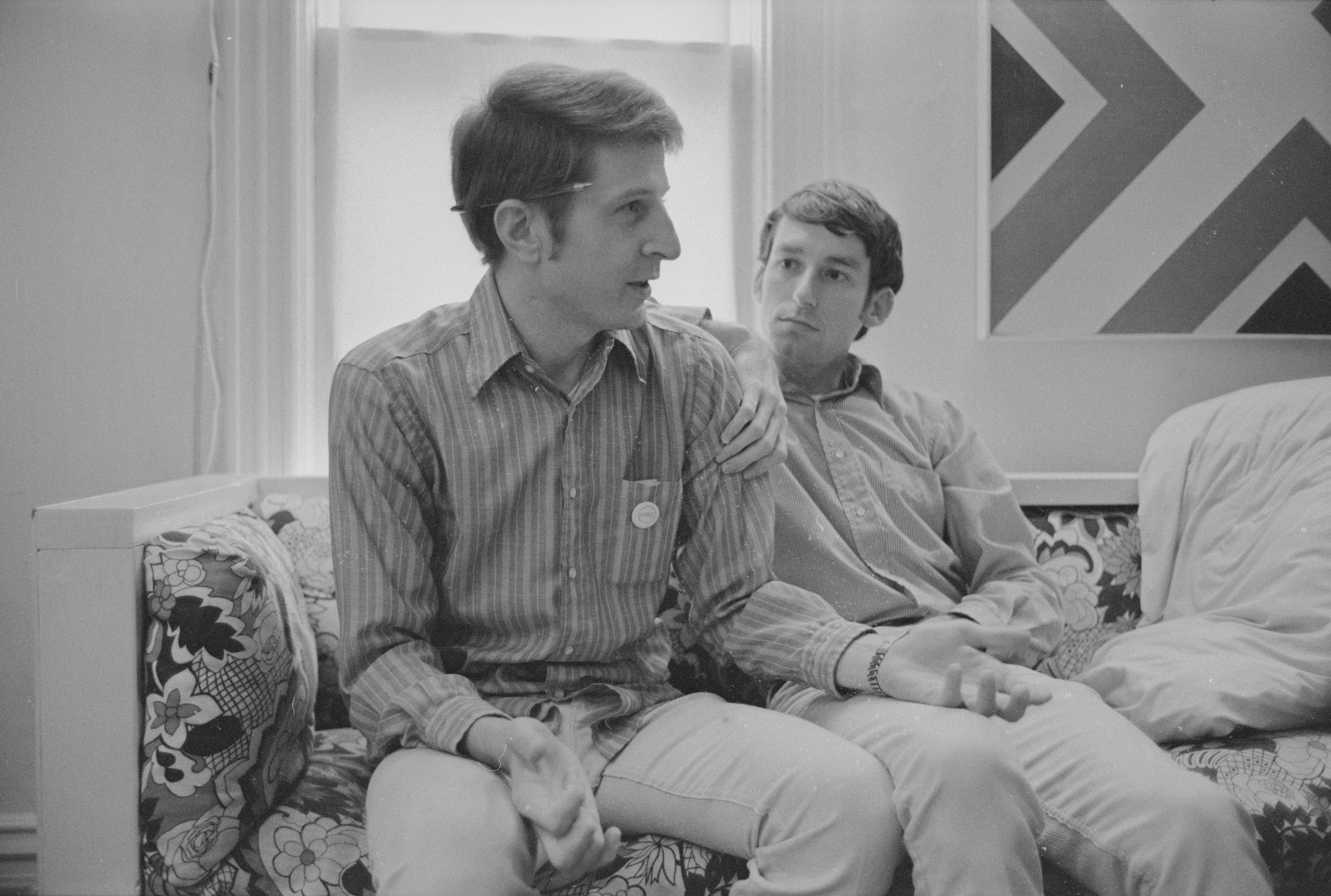
Baker and McConnell (r) at their Minneapolis home, 1970

Speaking to members of the Ramsey County Bar Association in 1971, Baker argued that same-sex unions are "not only authorized by the U.S. Constitution" but are mandatory. Later, Baker spoke at the University of Winnipeg, which activist Richard North credited as the start of a "fight [by same-sex couples in Canada] to be married" legally.

In 2012, after Ben Jealous, then president of the NAACP, called same-sex marriage the "civil rights issue of our times", Baker stated that "the conclusion was intuitively obvious to a first-year law student."

== Interviews ==
- Crann, Tom (July 16, 2015). "For Mpls. couple, gay marriage ruling is a victory 43 years in the making". MPR News. Minnesota Public Radio.
- Raphael, T. J. (June 25, 2015). "'You are as good as anybody else.' Same-sex couple who married in 1970 on Supreme Court move". The Takeaway. Public Radio International.

== Short documentary ==
- Kessler, Pat (July 29, 2013). "A Rare Glimpse At Minn.'s 1st Gay Wedding In 1971". WCCO-TV, Minneapolis.
- "Halftime". Minnesota United FC. June 23, 2021.
