= Falloon =

Falloon is a surname. Notable people with this surname include:

- Andrew Falloon (born 1983), New Zealand politician and member of parliament
- Beau Falloon (born 1987), rugby league footballer
- Colleen Falloon (born 1943), New Zealand netball player
- Eddie Falloon (1903–1963), Irish footballer
- John Falloon CNZM (1942–2005), New Zealand politician
- Pat Falloon (born 1972), Canadian ice hockey player

== See also ==
- Fallon (surname), another surname
- Fallone, another surname
