= Fallon House =

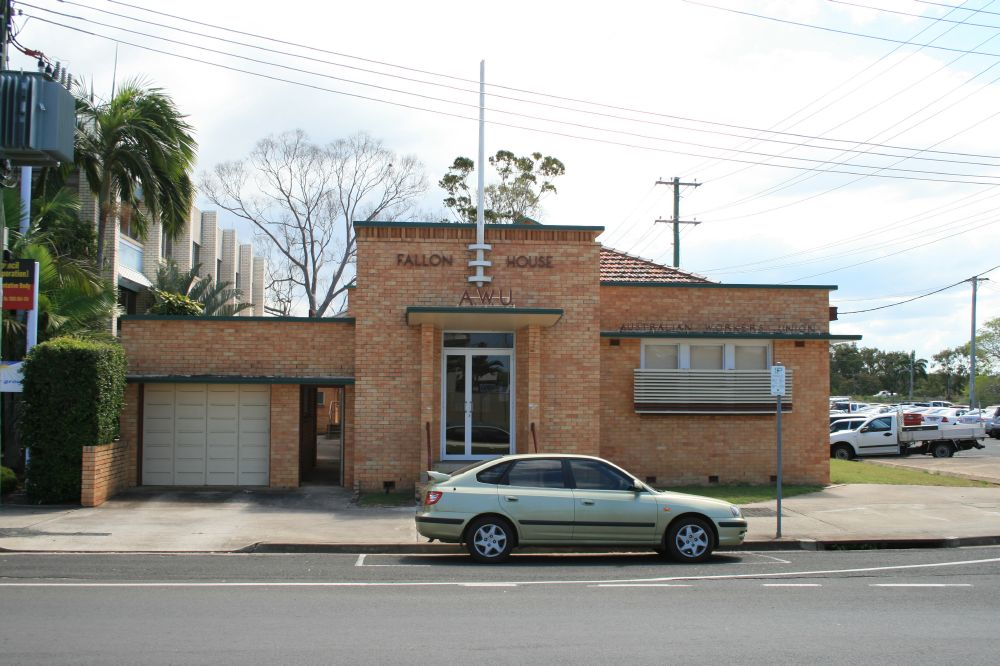
- Fallon House in 2010

- Location within Queensland Location within Australia
- 24.8659°S 152.3458°E
- Location: 1 Maryborough Street, Bundaberg Central, Bundaberg, Bundaberg Region, Queensland, Australia

Site notes
- Architect(s): David Ballinger Goodsir, Harold James Carlyle

Queensland Heritage Register
- Official name: Fallon House
- Type: state heritage
- Designated: 7 December 2012
- Reference no.: 602814
- Builders: Llewellyn Herbert Edwards

Fallon House is a heritage-listed trade union office at 1 Maryborough Street, Bundaberg Central, Bundaberg, Bundaberg Region, Queensland, Australia. It was designed by David Ballinger Goodsir and Harold James Carlyle and built in 1953 by Llewellyn Herbert Edwards. It was added to the Queensland Heritage Register on 7 December 2012.

== History ==
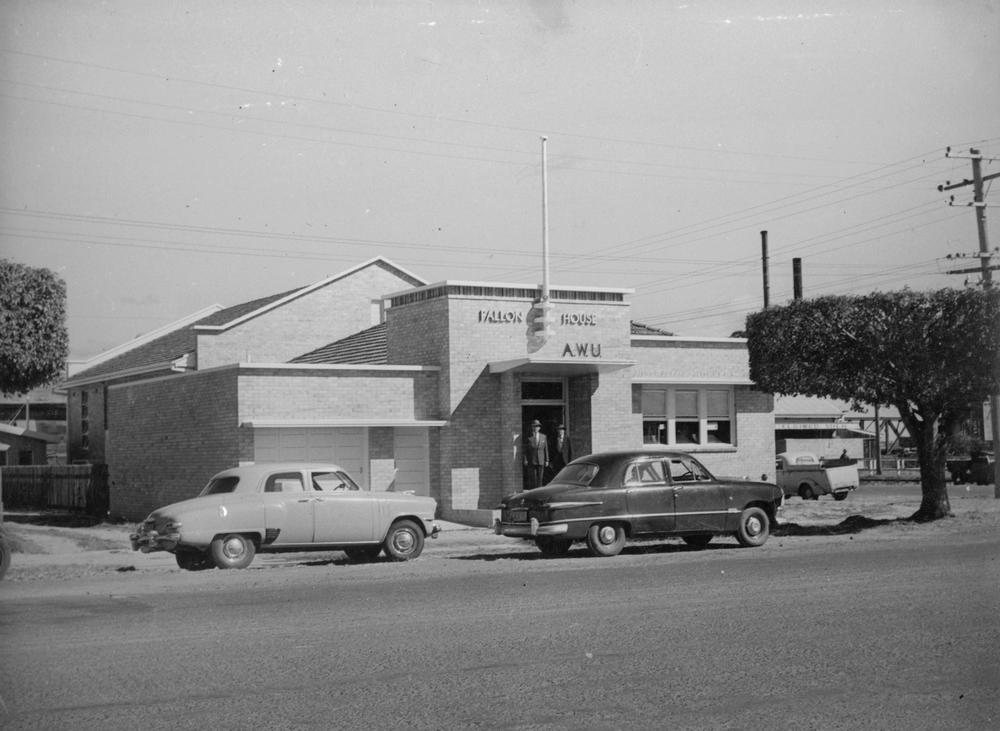
Fallon House in Bundaberg, 1953

Fallon House, the Central District office of the Australian Workers Union (AWU), is situated in Maryborough Street, Bundaberg, on the corner of Quay Street. The building was designed by Brisbane architects DB Goodsir and HJ Carlyle, built by L Edwards, and opened in 1953. It is a low set brick modernist style structure comprising offices addressing Maryborough Street and a hall at the rear accessed from Quay Street. It was named in honour of former central branch secretary and state secretary of the AWU Clarence Edward Fallon.

Between the years of 1918 and 1957, the Queensland Branch of the AWU was the largest branch of the largest union in Australia, with the Central District Office (Bundaberg) one of six offices of the union in Queensland. This period of domination of the union also coincides with the career of Clarrie Fallon, a temporary organiser in Bundaberg from 1921 who rose to the pinnacle of power in the union at a time when the Queensland Parliament ministerial team comprised mostly AWU members.

The economy of Bundaberg, initially based on timber, quickly evolved into sugar production as foundation settlers selected land in 1867–68 under the "Sugar and Coffee Regulations" stemming from the Crown Lands Alienation Act of the 1860s which aimed to promote agriculture and closer settlement. The site of Bundaberg was officially surveyed in 1869. Coastal traffic grew, and copper was first mined at Mount Perry in 1871, which enabled Bundaberg to develop as a port and supply centre. Sugar plantations were established in the surrounding area and were to become the basis for the city's wealth as the industry boomed from the 1880s.

Colonial Queensland workers formed loosely based organisations in an effort to improve working conditions. One such union was the Eight Hour Day movement, which was initiated in Queensland in 1858 by stonemasons working for John Petrie in Brisbane. The movement remained strong throughout Australia into the early 20th century. Most unions were small locally based organisations with no legal status. A Trades and Labour Council was established in Brisbane in 1885, followed by the Trade Union Act 1886 which legalised unions as organisations. Trade unions then took on a more permanent character as the Queensland economy consolidated and grew. Queensland workers recognised the value in a strong united union movement and formed the Australian Labour Federation (ALF), a combined industrial and political organisation. The ALF replaced the Trades and Labour Council in 1889. Its secretary, Albert Hinchcliffe a printer by trade, and journalist William Lane established The Worker newspaper in 1890 as the official newspaper of the union. The Australian Labour Party (ALP) formed at the first provincial council meeting of the ALF in August 1890.

The Amalgamated Workers Union formed in Queensland in December 1891, from a merger of the Queensland Shearers Union and the Queensland Labourer's Union, during the 1891 Australian shearers' strike. Following the economic downturn and decline in unionism later in the 1890s, the Trades and Labour Council reformed in 1904. In 1905, three western branches of the Amalgamated Workers Union, in Longreach, Charleville and Hughenden, joined with the southern pastoral Australian Workers Union (AWU) to form a new union in Queensland. Its origins were in the Shearer's Union, which formed in Ballarat, Victoria in 1886. Registered through the Commonwealth Conciliation and Arbitration Act 1905, this merger established a branch of the AWU in Queensland.

Another new union, the Amalgamated Workers Association (AWA) was formed by miners on the Atherton Tableland in 1907. Membership comprised unskilled and semi-skilled workers. In 1908 the Bundaberg District Workers Union and the Mackay Sugar Workers Union became affiliated with the AWA. Union secretary Edward Granville (Ted) Theodore then embarked on a political career, entering parliament in 1909. In December 1910 union vice president William McCormack recruited the Amalgamated Sugar Workers Union into the AWA, and instigated a general sugar strike in 1911.

The 1911 Queensland sugar strike occurred after the phasing out of South Sea Islander labour, with workers claiming that many plantation owners had substituted black slaves with white ones. Workers sought better accommodation, wages and conditions, including an eight-hour day and a minimum weekly wage of 30 shillings, including food. The mobilisation of unionists from Bundaberg to Mossman was a major achievement, with the 1911 strike lasting over seven weeks in Bundaberg where the town's economy was largely based on the sugar industry. The end result of the strike was a Commonwealth Royal Commission into the sugar industry in 1911–12, which had been initially requested by Harry Hall, a Bundaberg AWA organiser in 1908 with a petition signed by 1500 Bundaberg sugar workers. The Royal Commission, with ALF Secretary Albert Hinchcliffe as secretary, concluded the AWA demands had been justified. The union victory was a watershed in organised labour in Queensland and Australia.

The success of the AWA's 1911 sugar strike, led the ALF (reformed from the TLC in 1910) to initiate the general strike of 1912, the first of its kind in Australia. The ALF called all 42 of its affiliated unions to support dismissed tramway workers in Brisbane. The strike was quashed by armed police on "Black Friday", 2 February 1912. McCormack, who had been chairman of the Townsville strike committee, could see that the failure was due to the inability of the ALF to co-ordinate statewide action and conciliatory negotiations. He was keen to re-align unions in Queensland.

As a precursor to the formation of the Australia-wide Australian Workers Union, McCormack and Theodore attended the AWU national conference in Sydney in 1912, and sought out interstate amalgamations. This resulted in the merger of the AWA, of which Theodore was president, with the essentially southern based Australian Workers Union (AWU). Other unions which also joined forces at this time included the Rural Workers Union, the Carriers Union and the Rabbit Trappers Union. In Queensland the three AWU branches were consolidated into one and the state divided into six districts. The amalgamation was formalised on 1 July 1913. The AWA had held a virtual monopoly in North Queensland and the new organisation led to the national membership of the AWU reaching 62,000, 22,321 of whom were Queenslanders, making it the largest branch of the largest union in Australia at the time. This amalgamation spelt the end of the ALF. McCormack and Theodore were convinced that the AWU model of the amalgamation of smaller unions into One Big Union (OBU) was the way forward. EG Theodore was the first president of the Queensland branch of the AWU. The political affiliations of the AWA and subsequent AWU contributed to the election of the Labor government in Queensland in 1915, remaining in power for almost 40 years.

Recognising the need for a formal meeting place for unionists, the Bundaberg Eight Hour Day committee approached the Lands Department in July 1919 for a site for a Trades Hall. At the time, union meetings were held outdoors on the corner opposite the School of Arts. An informal lease (No. 453) was drawn up by the Lands Department to the union trustees, for the northern half of the allotment on the western corner of Quay and Maryborough Streets, allowing a building to be erected on the site. In March 1922 the Eight Hour Day Anniversary Committee was granted a three-year lease on the property.

The Bundaberg Trades and Labour Hall opened on the corner lot on 8 May 1922. An Eight Hour Day Parade was held followed by a sports gathering and dinner in the hall presided over by the president of the Bundaberg Trades and Labour Council. When the district land officer inspected the property in July 1923 he indicated that it comprised a five-roomed timber building (the Trades Hall) and offices adjoining occupied by the Australian Workers Union built of wood with two large rooms. By January 1924 the Bundaberg Trades and Labour Council had purchased the Perpetual Town Lease No 6087, of the corner allotment and the improvements on it i.e. the Trades Hall and adjoining offices. The lease document was drawn up in November 1924.

The Trades and Labour Council reformed in Brisbane in April 1922, coinciding with a renewed fervour for the establishment of One Big Union. A meeting in May at the Brisbane Trades Hall, addressed by the Queensland AWU Branch President AW Riordan, sought support for a union representing the whole of Australasia. The process had commenced in New South Wales, initiated by the miners' unions, which formed the Workers Industrial Union of Australia (WIUA) in 1918. At that time it did not have the support of the AWU, and since the WIUA was intent on dismantling the existing industrial and political system, this threatened the status quo of the AWU in Queensland which survived through its mutually beneficial relationship with the ALP and the sitting Labor government, making the OBU concept unpopular.

Bundaberg was a starting point for many AWU officials, including Clarrie Fallon after whom the Bundaberg AWU building is named. He began his working life driving a parcel delivery van, and became a representative of the Australian Carrier's Union in the Gladstone district in his youth. Becoming a member of the Bundaberg and District Sugar Workers and General Labourer's Union around 1908, he then worked on the railways. Fallon's father had been a shearer, involved in the great strikes of the late 1880s and his mother was a shearer's cook, and both had strong interests in the labour movement. Fallon's AWU career began as a temporary organiser in Bundaberg in 1921, where he initiated some of the union's work for better conditions for sugar workers, and pioneered the union involvement with the cattle industry. Two years later he was appointed manager of the central district's Rockhampton office. By 1928 he was northern district secretary, based in Townsville. In 1933 he was elected state secretary of the AWU Queensland Branch, managing director of the Queensland Worker and chairman of directors of the Labor Daily Newspaper Co. Ltd. By February 1938 he was president of the Queensland central executive of the ALP and was elected federal ALP president in July that year. In 1940 he was elected general secretary of the AWU. He resigned from this role for health reasons in February 1943, and resigned the ALP federal presidency in 1944. The same year he was appointed to the University of Queensland Senate. By 1946 he was again the Queensland branch secretary, fighting for a 40-hour week for shearers in Queensland.

AWU memberships were fairly evenly spread throughout the state in the 1920s, although a slightly larger membership existed in the Northern region, with the South West the smallest. For example, in 1924 the Northern Region had 5723, Central and Far Northern had over 5300, Southern 4728, Western 4493 and South Western had 3619.

The AWU dominated the ALP in Queensland where between 1920 and 1950, four out of six labour premiers came from the AWU ranks: EG Theodore, William McCormack, Frank Cooper and William Forgan Smith. Membership of the ALP declined during the Depression years and the organisation came to rely on the AWU's organisational support. AWU membership in Queensland was 53 000 in 1936, compared with 6 600 in New South Wales. Labor lost power in 1929. Following its re-election in 1933, the partnership of Premier Forgan Smith and secretary of the AWU Clarrie "the red terror" Fallon, emerged as one of the most powerful political teams in Queensland history. The ministry included nine officials of the AWU, while the brother of the only non-member, Ned Hanlon, was the editor of the Worker and a member of the Worker Board of Trustees. Even during the Depression years, the AWU continued to dominate in terms of trade union membership and by 1939 AWU membership had risen to 57,856, which was 50,000 more members than the nearest sized trade unions in Queensland.

The growing strength of the union, led Central Branch Secretary Clarrie Fallon to write to the Minister for Lands in 1945 seeking to purchase part of the Bundaberg property of the Trades and Labour Council to establish an office for the AWU. A mutual agreement with the TLC initiated a resurvey of the corner allotments and removal of the old timber buildings. A new lease for the property (Lot 14) was drawn up in January 1947 under the names of the executive of the TLC, and then transferred to the AWU Branch Trustees, Clarence Edward Fallon, James William McCarter and John Alfred Moir on 21 March 1947. Clarrie Fallon died in January 1950 on the eve of an AWU convention in Sydney.

The Bundaberg Office of the AWU was built when the union was at its peak in Australia. In 1950, a record state membership of the union of 66 353 was achieved. The AWU was largest union in Australia in 1950, with almost half of the national membership being in the Queensland branch. At its meeting of 9 May 1950, the central district committee moved to proceed with building a new district office in Bundaberg. Architects David B Goodsir and Harold J Carlyle were consulted to provide a design for the building in February 1951.

Carlyle had won the student medal at the Central Technical College in 1933, and had been articled to R Ashley Shaw, who later took him into partnership. Carlyle and Goodsir were in partnership from 1946, sometimes still working with Shaw. The firm designed the new Innisfail hospital and the Maryborough Fire Station in 1949, Emmanuel College at the University of Queensland in 1950, the Queensland Spastic Welfare League building at New Farm in December 1953, and the Bureau of Sugar Experimentation on Gregory Terrace in 1958. The firm later evolved to become Goodsir, Baker and Wilde.

The architects called tenders for the Bundaberg AWU building and the contract awarded to L Edwards in May 1952. Goodsir and Carlyle were part of a group of modernist architects producing functionalist designs often found in hospitals, schools, and offices in the 1950s. Governments and councils preferred this style, as its association with progress, innovation, efficiency and economy, made it an appealing choice in the post-depression era. Characteristics of the functionalist style in Australia include asymmetrical massing, simple geometric shapes, clean lines, steel framed corner and strip windows, undecorated brick walls, curved external corners, flat cantilevered concrete awnings and low pitched or flat roofs concealed behind parapets. Buildings constructed in Bundaberg at this time include: extensions to the hospital and the new Kepnock State High School in 1964, a new fire station (1950), the Canegrowers Building (1957), the 1957 4BU Radio Station a new courthouse in 1958 and the Civic Centre built in 1960.

The Bundaberg News Mail reported in December 1952 that the £16,000 AWU building was under construction and was the largest non-government building project in Bundaberg at the time. When completed it was to be named Fallon House. According to the newspaper, the city had experienced a ten percent growth in the construction of industrial and commercial buildings during the 1952 calendar year, including fourteen new factories, a foundry, a number of auto maintenance businesses and eighteen new shops. The sugar industry remained the biggest employer in the district with almost half engaged in sugar growing and manufacture. The building appears to have been completed by April 1953, as the new structure was inspected by Branch President J Bukowski and Branch Secretary Harold Boland at this time. The completion of the building was a landmark for the union, which now owned all of its offices. These included Longreach (1922), Mackay (1926), Townsville (1936), Cairns (1938), Charleville and Ayr, both completed in 1940. Fallon House honoured the memory of Clarrie Fallon, whose death, according to the Worker newspaper, 'was a loss to the Australian Worker's Union, the Labor Party and indeed the Commonwealth of Australia'.

At the time of construction of Fallon House, the AWU represented workers from a range of industries including cane cutters and sugar mills, Golding's sawmill in Gladstone, railway labour gangs employed on a project basis, Gladstone City Council and other local government employees, Carrick's Sawmill Rockhampton, Bundaberg foundry, Gladstone Butter Factory, Bundaberg Distillery, Mt Morgan mines, the Peanut Board in Rockhampton, Walkers Ltd in Maryborough, Biloela Butter Factory, Gladstone Harbour Board, Maryborough Hospital and other local hospitals. The inclusion of a garage in the design of the new offices is evidence of the necessity for union representatives to travel. For example, District Secretary Gerry Goding travelled to Monto, Eidsvold, Cracow, Theodore, Biloela and Mount Perry in early November 1954.

Fallon House provided a reception area staffed by union organisers where members to pay their fees and acquired union tickets, office space for union administrative staff, including a district secretary's office, bookkeeper's office, a kitchen and strong room within the main building, while the hall at the rear, served as a trades' hall where stop work meetings were held. The ALP also convened meetings here. The hall featured a stage and dressing rooms, and a small kitchen area, demonstrating the intent to derive income from its rental. The provision of a hall for public use was common in this type of building, and other AWU buildings in Townsville, Mackay, Ayr and Charleville included hall or dance halls, as did the Toowoomba Trades Hall, (Toowoomba Trades Hall) and other trades halls like Rockhampton, Brisbane and Ipswich. The local council used Fallon House Hall as an immunisation clinic during the week and in the late 60s, dances were held on weekends, as were other functions such as wedding receptions. In most recent years the hall has been used by a local dance school for lessons, performances and examinations. The property remained leased until the early 1970s when the land was converted to freehold. A Deed of Grant for the land was issued to the Trustees of the Australian Workers Union of Employees Queensland on 22 November 1972.

The fortunes of the AWU ebbed and flowed in the subsequent years. The ten-month-long shearer's strike of 1956 was ended by a declaration of a State of Emergency by Labor Premier Vince Gair. While the proposed cuts to shearing rates were restored and the strike was generally seen as a victory for shearers, it was followed by a breakdown in the relationship between the AWU and the ALP, the expulsion of Gair from the ALP in April 1957 and his formation of the Queensland Labor Party. It later formed a coalition with the Democratic Labor Party (DLP). Ted Walsh became the deputy leader of the QLP following the split, but by 1960 ran as an independent. His strong personal local following saw him retain his Bundaberg seat until his retirement in 1969. At the same time the management of the Central Branch of the AWU in Bundaberg rested with district secretary Gerry Goding from 1942, who is credited in healing the rift between the ALP and the AWU in later years. Goding guided the union membership through the transition from a labour-intensive agrarian economy to an increasingly diverse one, particularly after increased mechanisation in the sugar industry, and the merger of mill operations. New ventures evolved, including the production of sugar harvesting and other agricultural machinery, which led to a decline in AWU memberships as the role of canecutters diminished. However, there has been a growth in employment by local government undertaking sewerage and water supply schemes. Workers employed in these industries, and those employed in hospitals, water supply and forestry were members of the AWU. The union was involved in a number of major industrial issues during the 1960s including the Mt Isa mines disputes of 1961 and 1964 and the 1967 Collinsville power station construction dispute, in which the AWU recruited the contractors employed as strike breakers. The Mt Isa and Collinsville disputes continued the union's somewhat controversial reputation at that time.

The AWU continued to represent a range of occupations through the 1980s, becoming involved in disputes related to environmental issues, particularly in its support of workers employed in ventures such as forestry and sand mining on Fraser Island, uranium mining, and logging in the rainforests around Cairns. It also supported the construction of the Gordon below Franklin Dam in Tasmania in the early 1980s, which did not proceed following the election of the Hawke Labor Government in 1983. In 1993 the AWU merged with the Federation of Industrial Manufacturing and Engineering Employees (FIME) giving it greater membership in the mining industry, supporting jobs growth despite environmental concerns. During 2009 the sugar industry again dominated the union's activities in Bundaberg, with members shut out of the Bingera and Millaquin mills after striking to protect leave entitlements. In 2011, a former National Party, now independent politician called on the AWU to fight the closure of the Babinda Sugar Mill, owned by a joint venture of foreign owned Bundaberg Sugar and Maryborough Sugar Factory. The union celebrated the 125th anniversary of its inauguration in Ballarat in 1886 with a national conference on the Gold Coast in February 2011, and in 2013 celebrated the centenary of the formal amalgamation of smaller unions into the AWU in July 1913. Fallon House continues to operate as the Central District office of the union.

== Description ==
Fallon House is a small brick building accommodating a hall and offices on a corner lot in a central location in Bundaberg. The building fronts onto Maryborough Street to the east providing access to the offices and the garage. It has a secondary access on the north from Quay Street which provides access to the hall behind. The building sits on the eastern half of a rectangular 933-square-metre (10,040 sq ft) allotment with a grassed yard occupying the remainder of the site.

The building is one-storey cavity brick with pale orange face brick sheltered by a terracotta tiled roof (hipped over the offices and gabled over the hall). It is designed in a functionalist style with a cubic form with horizontal continuous cantilevered concrete window hoods, and minimal decoration.

The Maryborough Street elevation is asymmetrical around a projecting central entrance bay. The entrance is reached by a short flight of concrete stairs and sheltered by a cantilevered concrete awning. The exterior walls have short parapets topped with cement rendered coping. A large flagpole is above the entrance bay and a band of decorative brickwork runs below the coping. Attached to the face and awnings of the building are large letters FALLON HOUSE, A.W.U., and AUSTRALIAN WORKERS UNION. The front door is a modern aluminium-framed glazed double leaf and is not of cultural heritage significance.

The Quay Street entry to the hall is sheltered by a concrete awning over a short flight of concrete steps. Generally, the windows of the offices are timber framed double hung sashes. The bottom sashes contain obscure rippled glass and the windows on the north and east are shielded by fixed aluminium blades. The windows of the hall are large banks of steel-framed, awning windows with horizontally-ribbed glazing. The building has metal rainwater downpipes surface mounted to the face of the building with large, prominent rainheads. The garage is separated from the main building by a narrow concrete floored alley. Attached to the rear of the garage is a ladies toilet. Behind this is a concreted area and further back is a detached gents toilet block with a skillion roof. The toilets and garage are the same face brick as the main building.

The office consists of a small entry foyer with reception desk, three offices, a kitchen, and a strong room. Rooms have vinyl tile floors, sheet wall linings with timber skirtings, picture rails and architraves, and the ceiling is fibrous plaster sheets with moulded plaster cornices. The strong room has a concrete floor and rendered concrete walls and ceiling. The rooms retain original built-in cupboards with original hardware, some original light fixtures and light switching plates, and the strong room retains original locks and timber shelving. Internal doors are timber with original hardware. Some windows have internal wind deflecting glass shields at sill level and some partitions have ribbed glass windows at a high level. The foyer retains the original timber veneer reception desk in front of a timber veneer partition with ribbed glazing. The kitchen retains original joinery including cabinet handles, sink and tapware, benchtop, and green splashback tiles.

The hall is accessed from both Quay Street and the rear of the office via a small foyer with double silky oak doors that open into the large hall. The hall floor is timber and the walls are sheeted and have a timber skirting. Acoustic sheets are attached at a high level of the back wall. The coved ceiling consists of a grid of large, square sheets with timber cover strips, hanging fluorescent lights, and a long central feature panel ventilation grille. At the western end of the hall is a raised stage with proscenium accessed by stairs at either side. The stage is flanked by a small room either side; one contains a kitchen with original joinery, benchtop, sink, tapware, and tiled splashback, the other is a small backstage room with a set of timber stairs and provides access to the stage wing. The doors in the hall are clear-finished silky oak and the paint scheme throughout the hall appears to be original. Doors at the western end open out onto a short flight of concrete stairs into the concreted yard.

The toilet blocks have polished concrete floors, fibrous plaster sheet walls and ceilings, with timber coverstrips and cornices. The rooms have square timber framed windows of obscure glass louvres. The cubicle partitions are terrazzo and the walls are lined with green square ceramic tiles. The toilet blocks retain original fixtures and fittings including toilets, urinal, basins, and light fittings.

== Heritage listing ==
Fallon House was listed on the Queensland Heritage Register on 7 December 2012 having satisfied the following criteria.

The place is important in demonstrating the evolution or pattern of Queensland's history.

Fallon House in Bundaberg (1953), as the Central District Office of the Australian Workers' Union (AWU), is a product of the growth of the union in Queensland in the first half of the 20th century. It is important in demonstrating the evolution of workers' history in Queensland and the influential contribution that the union movement has made to the development of the state. The construction of a purpose built AWU office and hall in 1953 occurred at a time when the union was at its peak, with the Queensland Branch having been the largest branch of Australia's largest trade union for 40 years.

The site is associated with significant early union activity to improve workers' conditions in Bundaberg and Central Queensland, including the Eight Hour Day movement and the AWU from 1923.

The place is important in demonstrating the principal characteristics of a particular class of cultural places.

Fallon House demonstrates the principal characteristics of a purpose-built district union office, which has continually served members since its construction in 1953. The internal layout of the building illustrates its function, with office spaces for union organisers, administrative staff and district secretary. The attached hall functioned as an Australian Worker's Union and Australian Labor Party meeting place and a venue for local community activities. Its highly intact modernist style reflects the dynamism of Bundaberg in the post-war era when a range of similarly styled functionalist public buildings were erected to symbolise progress, innovation and optimism for the future.

The place is important because of its aesthetic significance.

Fallon House exhibits aesthetic characteristics of a well composed modernist building, highly intact both internally and externally, contributing to the streetscape of Quay Street Bundaberg.

The place has a special association with the life or work of a particular person, group or organisation of importance in Queensland's history.

Fallon House in Bundaberg has a strong association with the membership of the Australian Workers Union (AWU), an organisation that has played in important role in the union movement in Queensland. From the inauguration of the AWU in July 1913, until 1957, the Queensland Branch was the largest branch of Australia's largest union. Constructed at the time the union was at its peak in Queensland, the place demonstrates the work of the AWU in providing a purpose-built district office to serve their members.

In continuous use since 1953 as the AWU's Central District Office, the building was named in honour of Clarrie Fallon, Bundaberg organiser from 1921, who became state secretary of the union by 1933, and was vice-president of the executive of both the ALP and the AWU by 1950.
