= Fallon (given name) =

Fallon is a given name of the following people:

- Fallon Bowman (born 1983), South African born Canadian musician
- Fallon Fox (born 1975), American mixed martial arts fighter
- Fallon Kelly (1907–1992), United States Attorney
- Fallon King (born 1988), American singer and member of Cherish
- Fallon Sherrock (born 1994), English darts player
- Fallon Taylor (born 1982), American barrel racer

== Fictional characters ==
- Fallon Carrington Colby, a character in the television series Dynasty
- Fallon Rogers, a character in the radio series The Archers
