= James Chalgren =

American activist (1951–2000)

James Eric Chalgren
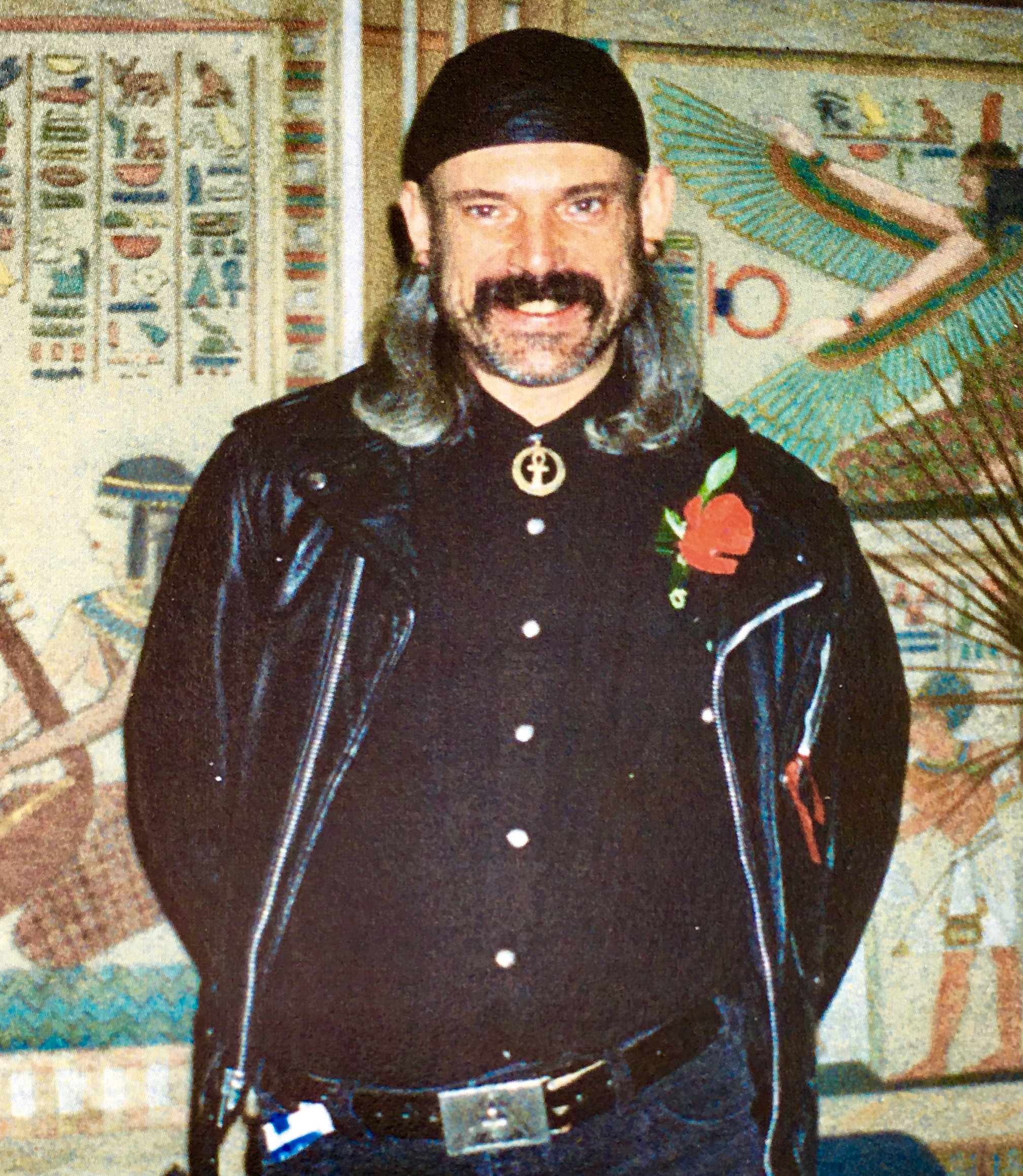
- James Chalgren in 1987
- Born: July 15, 1951; Mankato, Minnesota, U.S.
- Died: April 23, 2000 (aged 48); Minneapolis, Minnesota, U.S.
- Education: Minnesota State University, Mankato (MS)
- Occupation: Counselor
- Employer: Minnesota State University, Mankato
- Known for: Photos (1973) that led to an expanding collection of "Gay Pride" events beyond Minneapolis.

James "Jim" Eric Chalgren (July 15, 1951 – April 23, 2000) was an American gay activist best known for establishing the first LGBT resource center on a college campus in Minnesota.

== Education ==
James Chalgren attended Prescott College in Prescott, Arizona for two years, then transferred to the Minnesota State University, Mankato to earn his bachelor's degree in sociology. He then earned his master's degree in Counseling and Student Personnel at the Minnesota State University, Mankato. Later in life, Chalgren began a Ph.D. program at the University of Minnesota but did not complete the program due to poor health.

== Career ==
Chalgren worked as a counselor at the Minnesota State University, Mankato, and also served as the director of the Alternative Lifestyles office (later known as the Jim Chalgren LGBT Resource Center).

== Work ==
As a graduate student in the Counseling and Student Personnel program, James Chalgren established the Alternative Lifestyles office at the Minnesota State University, Mankato in 1977. This was the first gay and lesbian center in Minnesota, and the second in the nation. Chalgren served as director of this center until he became too ill to do so. In 2003, students staged a sit-in to hire a new full-time director of the center, which happened in 2004. In 2008, the Minnesota State University, Mankato officially named the center the Jim Chalgren LGBT Resource Center.

In 1985, Chalgren co-founded The Aliveness Project, a community service program for individuals afflicted with HIV/AIDS. The project started out as a series of potluck dinners, then extended to a food shelf, outreach, and case management services to educate HIV/AIDS patients about nutrition and healthcare. The Aliveness Project served as a model for similar programs across the United States.

In 1987, Chalgren led a campaign for an LGBTQ non-discrimination ordinance in Mankato. The Mankato City Council voted down this ordinance.

Chalgren contributed multiple poems and articles to The GLC Voice, Gaze, and Lavender Magazine.

== Personal life ==
Chalgren was a member of the Minneapolis leather club The Atons, and was an active member of The Cavern Dwellers. Chalgren identified as Episcopalian and was a member of Integrity, an LGBTQ Episcopal organization. He had lifelong fascinations with Egyptology, Christian theology, and Buddhism.

== Legacy ==
In 2013, the GLBT Issues Committee of the Interfaculty Organization (IFO) created the annual James Eric Chalgren Award for Outstanding Contributions to the Advancement of Lesbian, Gay, Bisexual, and Transgender (LGBT) Issues. This award recognizes one IFO faculty member working at a four-year institution within the Minnesota State Colleges and Universities system (MnSCU) who improves the lives of LGBTQ faculty, helps the system recognize, hire, retain, tenure, and promote LGBTQ faculty, advocates on issues that have substantial impact on LGBTQ employees, and has significant IFO service.

== Publications ==
- The Nature and Function of Homophobia: A Review of the Literature: Definition, Justification, and Theory. (1980: Culminating project).
- Human Rights...and Justice For All: A Case for Extending Human Rights to Gay Men and Lesbian Women: A Document. (1987: Edited by George E Capowich; Jim Chalgren; Daina D Farthing-Capowich; Barbara R Keating; Citizens for Human Rights).
- Small Town Gay: Mankato Poems. (1988).
- The Failure of Addressing Diversity in America: AIDS. (1994: Videotape).
