= Gail Langer Karwoski =

American children's author (born 1949)

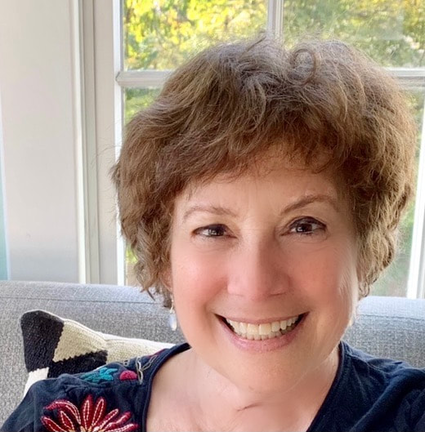
- Gail Karwoski in 2021
- Born: Gail Marilyn Langer; 1949; Boston, Massachusetts
- Education: University of Minnesota (1972); University of Massachusetts (1970); Brookline High School (1966)
- Occupation(s): Author, teacher
- Known for: Children's books; adult fiction; non-fiction

Gail Langer Karwoski (born 1949) is an American author whose writings includes adult fiction, historical fiction and non-fiction.

She was born in Boston, Massachusetts to Farley Langer, a Polish immigrant, and her mother, Esther Weiner. The family lived above their store, Farley's Hardware, in Jamaica Plain, Massachusetts, until Karwoski was in primary school. Afterwards, they moved to Brookline, Massachusetts, and Gail graduated from Brookline High School in 1966. She received a B.A. in English from the University of Massachusetts in 1970.

In 1972, Karwoski received an M.A. in English Literature and Cultural Anthropology from the University of Minnesota in Minneapolis. She worked as a reporter for a small, weekly newspaper in Minneapolis and then became the communications director of the student-owned corporation, the Minnesota Student Association, under student body president, Jack Baker.

== Writings ==
=== Early beginning ===
In 1974, she moved to Athens, Georgia with her husband, Chester John Karwoski, who became a psychology professor at the University of Georgia. In 1974–80 and 1985–96, Karwoski taught in Georgia public schools in Clarke and Oconee Counties. In 1980–85, she was an editor/writer at the University of Georgia's Carl Vinson Institute of Government. In 1996, her first book was published.

=== Awards ===
- 2013: Moonbeam Gold Award
- 2013: Sydney Taylor Book Award
- 2013: Board Book Roundup selection in the New York Times
- 2010: Georgia Center for the Book list of 25 Books all young Georgians should read
- 2009: Georgia Picture Book Author of the Year by Georgia Writers Association
- 2007: Finalist, New Mexico Land of Enchantment Book Award
- 2007: Colonial Williamsburg & Williamsburg Library Beacon of Freedom Award
- 2007: Notable Social Studies Trade Book for Young People
- 2007: Learning Magazine Teachers Choice Award
- 2006: Finalist, Florida Sunshine State Young Readers Award
- 2006: Finalist, Massachusetts Children's Book Award
- 2006: Finalist, Nevada Young Readers Award
- 2006: Finalist, Tennessee Volunteer State Book Award
- 2006: Finalist, Rhode Island Children's Book Award
- 2006: Finalist, Southern Book Prize
- 2005: Finalist, foreword Magazine, Book of the Year
- 2005: Featured title, National Book Festival Pavilion of States
- 2004: Maxwell Medal for Best Children's Book by Dog Writers Association of America
- 2001: Finalist, South Dakota Prairie Pasque Book Award
- 2001: Finalist, Tennessee Volunteer State Book Award
- 2001: Work-in-Progress Grant runner-up, Society of Children's Book Writers and Illustrators
- 2001: Bank Street College Best Children's Books of the Year
- 2000: Finalist, Georgia Children's Book Award

== Works ==
=== Authored ===
- Skeleton in the Art Closet (Black Rose Writing, 2023)
- A Brush with Murder (Black Rose Writing, 2022)
- The Tale of the Children's Arthur
- The Wedding Heard Round the World; America's First Gay Marriage (The University of Minnesota Press, 2016)
- When Hurricane Katrina Hit Home (The History Press, 2013)
- Testing Ground (2013)
- Search and Rescue Dogs (Capstone Press, 2013)
- Terriers; Loyal Hunting Companions (Capstone Press, 2013)
- Thank You, Trees! (Kar-Ben, 2013) with Marilyn Gootman
- River Beds; Sleeping in the World's Rivers (S?Arbordale Publishing, 2008)
- Julie the Rockhound (Arbordale Publishing, 2007)
- Tsunami: The True Story of an April Fool's Day Disaster (Ohio: Darby Creek Publishers, 2006)
- Water Beds; Sleeping in the Ocean (Arbordale Publishing, 2005)
- Miracle: The True Story of the Wreck of the Sea Venture (Ohio: Darby Creek Publishers, 2004)
- Quake! Disaster in San Francisco, 1906 (Atlanta: Peachtree Publishers, 2004)
- Surviving Jamestown: The Adventures of Young Sam Collier (Atlanta: Peachtree Publishers, 2001)
- Seaman, the Dog Who Explored the West with Lewis and Clark (Atlanta: Peachtree Publishers, 1999)
- The Tree that Owns Itself; and Other Adventure Tales from Georgia's Past (Peachtree Publishers, 1996) with Loretta Hammer

=== Edited works ===
- An Introduction to Law in Georgia (Carl Vinson Institute of Government, 1985).
- Teaching Georgia Government (Carl Vinson Institute of Government, 1977–81)
- City Government in Georgia (Carl Vinson Institute of Government, 1980)
