= John Fallon (photographer) =

American photographer and film maker

John Fallon is an American photographer and film maker known for his surrealist work.

Born and raised in farmhouse on Ruby Vineyard in Oregon, he got his first camera when he was 5 years old and made his first short film at the age of 11. His full name is John Fallon Hiestand III.

== Career ==
Freelancing for several guide books and magazines in Europe and North America, he began his professional career photographing his travels documenting landscapes, architecture, and the people he encountered. He spent several years living in Italy as well as Hawaii. Based on the outcome of a coin flip, he decided to move to New York City in 2001 to pursue his career.However, he arrived only a few days after the attacks on the World Trade Center and decided to move to his second choice at the time Los Angeles.

Having lived and spent time working in over 45 countries Fallon integrates fashion, grit, nature, travel documentary, celebrity, humour, and edge. Fallon's ability to marry though provoking and provocative imagery with sometimes unusual situations ask the viewer to re-examine their own boundaries and take foothold into the unknown. Fallon's work is sometimes portrayed in the simple purity of nature, while other times infused with colours, texture, and vice. His ability to capture the sensuality of both men and women leaving them vulnerable and exposed in his intimate settings. Fallon has representation at several fine art galleries and his work has been published in numerous publications such as Elle, Vogue, Runway Magazine, ACAPA, The Advocate, The New York Times, BPM, Playgirl, Wallpaper, Frontiers etc. his work has also been seen on T.V. shows as well as movies including Entourage, The Soloist, to name a few.

He is currently working on two books simultaneously as well as a feature documentary.
