= The Fallon Company =

- Type: Private
- Industry: Real estate
- Founded: 1993
- Founder: Joseph F. Fallon
- Headquarters: Boston, Massachusetts, U.S.
- Number of locations: 4
- Area served: United States
- Key people: Joseph F. Fallon (Founder); Michael Fallon (CEO)
- Services: Commercial real estate development, property ownership and urban mixed-use development
- Total assets: Developed over $6 billion in real estate
- Website: falloncompany.com

The Fallon Company is a privately held commercial real estate company headquartered in Boston, Massachusetts. Founded by Joseph F. Fallon in 1993, The Fallon Company has developed over $6 billion in real estate, representing more than six million square feet of property. The company is recognized as a leader in mixed-use urban development and one of the most active private developers on the East Coast. The company focuses on large-scale urban design geared toward transforming neighborhoods into cohesive, community-driven environments. The company has offices in Boston, Charlotte, and Nashville.

== Projects ==
=== Boston, Massachusetts ===
Starting in 2005, when they seized the opportunity to acquire Fan Pier in partnership with MassMutual, The Fallon Company redeveloped 21 acres of abandoned parking lots along Boston Harbor into a mixed-use destination that later became known as Fan Pier.

One Harbor Shore broke ground in 2024 and is the final development located at The Fallon Company’s Fan Pier master development. Located along the Boston Harbor, this ground-up development will consist of 122 condominium units.

=== Nashville, Tennessee ===
In 2021, The Fallon Company established its Nashville office to support the firm’s expansion into one of the fastest-growing real estate markets in the U.S., and adding to its existing offices in Boston, Charlotte, and Raleigh. In September 2023, Metro Nashville selected The Fallon Company as the master developer for a 30-acre Initial Development Area on the East Bank of the Cumberland River, adjacent to the newly constructed Tennessee Titans stadium. This public–private collaboration was formally cemented with Metro Council’s unanimous approval of the master developer agreement on April 16, 2024. The plan envisions a mixed‑use neighborhood featuring affordable housing, retail, hospitality, green public spaces, transportation infrastructure, and Nashville’s first dedicated transit lanes. In 2025, the company announced the 30-acre neighborhood would be named, "Eastpoint".

In May 2026, The Fallon Company and affordable housing developer Elmington Capital broke ground on Eastpoint Flats, the first building in the Eastpoint district and the first phase of the development. Located on Parcel G, the all-affordable project is planned to include 323 income-restricted housing units, an 8,420-square-foot childcare facility, and 12,600 square feet of retail space. The development is enabled by a 99-year ground lease with Metro Nashville intended to preserve long-term affordability.

=== Charlotte, North Carolina ===
In 2016, The Fallon Company established its Southeast headquarters in Charlotte, North Carolina. Shortly thereafter, Horizon Development Properties selected The Fallon Company as master developer to redevelop the 16.2-acre Strawn Cottages site in the Dilworth neighborhood of Charlotte. The Fallon Company is leading the $330 million mixed-use and mixed-income project known as Centre South, a property bounded by South Boulevard, Templeton Avenue and Euclid Avenue. When built out, the redevelopment will feature a 1.6-acre expansive green space, 975 mixed-income residential units, 36,000 square feet of retail, a 405,000-square-foot office building and a 180-room hotel.

In 2024, The Fallon Company broke ground on The Colwick, a 234-unit residential development in Charlotte's Cotswold neighborhood.

In May 2026, The Fallon Company broke ground on Twelve03, the first phase of Centre South. Developed in partnership with the Charlotte housing authority Inlivian, the mid-rise development is planned to include 329 residential units, of which 20 percent are designated as workforce housing at 65% and 80% of area median income (AMI).

== Leadership ==
Michael Fallon was named chief executive officer in 2022, after serving as president of the company. He succeeded Joseph Fallon, the founder of the company, who moved into the role of chairman. At the same time, Brian Awe was named partner and president of the company.
