= O'Fallons, Nebraska =

Unincorporated community in Nebraska, U.S.

Coordinates: 41°09′37″N 101°04′38″W

O'Fallons is an unincorporated community in Lincoln County, Nebraska, United States.

== History ==
O'Fallons was named from the O'Fallons Bluff nearby.
