= Jonathan Fallon =

English rugby league footballer spelled "Jonathon Fallon."

Jon Fallon
Personal information
- Full name: Jonathon Fallon
- Born: 11 May 1987 (age 38) Hull, England

Playing information
- Position: Prop
Club
Years	Team	Pld	T	G	FG	P
2002–08	Hull Kingston Rovers	6	0	0	0	0
2009	Featherstone Rovers	17	1	0	0	4
2010	York City Knights	0	0	0	0	0
	Total	23	1	0	0	4

Jonathon "Jon" Fallon (born c. 1987) is a professional rugby league footballer who played in the 2000s and 2010s. He played at club level for Hull Kingston Rovers, Featherstone Rovers, and York City Knights.

== Background ==
Jonathon Fallon was a pupil at Archbishop Thurstan school in Kingston upon Hull.

== Playing career ==
Jonathon Fallon made his début for Featherstone Rovers on Sunday 15 February 2009.

== Note ==
Jonathon "Jon" Fallon is occasionally misnamed as John Fallon.
