= Belltower, Maryborough Fire Station =

Heritage listed fire station in Victoria, Australia

Maryborough Fire Station
- Location within Victoria
- 37°02′44″S 143°44′12″E
- Location: Neill Street, Maryborough, Victoria

History
- Built: 1888

Victorian Heritage Register
- Reference no.: VHR 67719

The Belltower of the Maryborough Fire Station in Maryborough, Victoria was built in 1888, and is important as one of a small group of fire station towers erected in Victoria. It is an example of a rare building type, essential to the nineteenth century city, made redundant by the advent of electric communications.

The design of the brick part of the tower is eclectic, with a wide arched base, battered walls, diagonally placed windows, and an Italianate arcaded belfry. This is topped by a most unusual, very tall timber superstructure.

The Belltower is attached to the fire station which was built in 1861, and now used as the Maryborough Art Gallery.

The belltower is listed on the defunct Register of the National Estate and was classified in 1975 on a non-statutory heritage list by the Victorian branch of the National Trust of Australia as historically significant to the region.
