= Richard Fallon =

Richard Fallon may refer to:

- Richard Fallon (police officer) (1926–1970), Irish police officer
- Richard G. Fallon (1923–2013), American academic
- Richard H. Fallon Jr. (1952–2025), American legal scholar
