= Sean Fallon =

Sean Fallon may refer to:

- Sean Fallon (footballer) (1922–2013), Irish footballer
- Seán Fallon (politician) (1937–1995), Irish Fianna Fáil politician
- Sean Fallon (NZ_footballer) (1976–present), New Zealand footballer
