= Fallon Taylor =

American barrel racer (b. 1982)

- Occupation: Rodeo competitor
- Discipline: Barrel racing
- Born: July 18, 1982 (age 44); Tampa, Florida, United States
- Major wins/Championships: 2014 WPRA barrel racing world champion 2018 AQHA barrel racing world champion 2019 Thoroughbred Makeover barrel racing champion

Honors
- 7 NFR qualifications 2013-2015 Jerry Ann Taylor Best Dressed Award at NFR

Memorials
- Barrel Racer

Significant horses
- Babyflo (Flo's Heiress); Flowers and Money (Flojo); Flo's Nick Nack; Dr. Nick Bar

Website
- fallontaylor.com

Fallon Taylor is an American professional rodeo cowgirl who specializes in barrel racing. She is the 2014 Women's Professional Rodeo Association (WPRA) Barrel Racing World Champion. She qualified for the National Finals Rodeo (NFR) seven times between 1995–1998 and 2013–2015. She made her first NFR debut when she was 13 years old in 1995. Her horse BabyFlo was named the Women's Professional Rodeo Association/American Quarter Horse Association WPRA/AQHA Barrel Racing Horse of the Year in 2013.

== Early life ==
Fallon Taylor was born July 18, 1982, in Tampa, Florida. Taylor was the youngest of three children born to Shelton and Dian Taylor. Taylor was seven years old the first time she watched rodeo, and she developed an intense desire to participate. Wanting to encourage and support Taylor, her parents moved the family to Texas where they better accommodate her. Having no equestrian background, they had her train with an industry legend, Martha Josey. Josey also trained Taylor's mare, Flowers and Money, who was the dam of Babyflo. She was homeschooled in order to focus on her riding.

== Career ==
Taylor was eight years old when she joined the Women's Professional Rodeo Association in 1990. She first qualified for the NFR at the young age of 13 in 1995. She also qualified for the next three years. Also in 1995, Taylor placed sixth in the World Standings and placed 12th in her last year as a qualifier. As a teenager, she qualified for four NFRs. At age 14, Taylor won RodeoHouston, the largest rodeo in the world, and banked a check for $15,000. For Taylor, being a teenager in the top rodeo in the country was a big deal. "It was awesome," she said. "I had a different perspective than the adults who went there stressing out about different things. I was just excited to be in Vegas, to go Circus Circus and ride the big top, sign a few autographs and get on my horse." The horses that got her to the NFR at that time were Dr. Nick Bar and Flowers and Money.

=== Seasons 1995-1998 ===
- 1995 – Finished 6th in the World Standings with $62,414
- 1996 – Finished 9th in the World Standings with $59,925
- 1997 – Finished 7th in the World Standings with $56,556
- 1998 – Finished 12th in the World Standings with $47,277

However, after 1998, she lost interest in barrel racing. She was encouraged to take advantage of all the opportunities that came her way. She grew tired of life on the road and excited by the life of New York City. Then she decided she wanted to focus on acting and modeling. She modeled in New York City, acted in Los Angeles, California, and trained horses in Texas for others for about fifteen years. She acted in roles in High Hopes, The Loop, Four Kings and as Charlie Sheen's girlfriend on Two and A Half Men. She also worked as the Axe Body Spray girl. During this time that she trained horses, she did not return to competitive rodeo.

In 2009, Taylor was loping a gelding one evening when the horse slipped. The horse started bucking. "It got Western," she said. "He was snapping and kicking. He reared up and fractured my skull in four places. I picked a spot to land and tried to get off – terrible idea. When I did, he kicked my feet and I went 12 feet in the air and landed straight on my head." For three days, Taylor was paralyzed. She fractured her skull in four places, shattered bones on the right side of her face along with her eye socket, and fractured her C-2 vertebra. Doctors predicted only 2 percent chance that she would walk again. Taylor made it her only goal to recover from her injuries. She even wore a halo for three months. She recovered enough to walk again after 1 and 1/2 years. After that, she made her next goal to ride again. It took her a year of substandard riding before she found her pace again. In fact, she said that she rides better now than before the accident. "I ride ten times better now than the first finals in the 90s, I have a lot more awareness of my body and my horse."

After her recovery and with her husband's support, Taylor was determined to return to competitive rodeo at the age of 31. She choose the offspring of the horse who took her to the NFR four times in her teenage years, BabyFlo, who was a young mare. They started BabyFlo right away. BabyFlo placed in the top of her division at her first rodeo, albeit with many mistakes. However, though Babyflo surprised Taylor with her potential, she immediately told her family this was the horse who would take her back to the top.

=== Season 2012 ===
Taylor finished 2012 ranked 16th in the World Standings with $53,922 in season earnings. She won the Defeat of Jesse James Days Rodeo (Northfield, Minnesota), the Great Plains Stampede Rodeo (Altus, Oklahoma), the Breckenridge (Colorado) Stables PRCA Rodeo, the Douglas County Fair & Rodeo (Castle Rock, Colorado), the 101 Wild West Rodeo (Ponca City, Oklahoma), the Jayhawker Roundup Rodeo (Hill City, Kansas), the Barber County Fair and Rodeo (Hardtner, Kansas), the Scottsbluff County Fair & Rodeo (Mitchell, Nebraska), the Auburn (California) Wild West Stampede and the Lakeside (California) Rodeo. This season the duo really started to become a unit and move up the standings. Placing 16th was just one spot away from qualifying for the NFR. Babyflo performed so well that she was named PRCA/WPRA AQHA Reserve Barrel Racing Horse of the Year.

=== Season 2013 ===
Taylor finished the year ranked 11th in the World Standings with $116,785 in season earnings. She won $15,925 at the NFR; She won the Home of Champions (Red Lodge, Montana), the Mandan (North Dakota) Rodeo Days, the Williams Lake (British Columbia) Stampede, the Mother Lode Round-Up (Sonora, California), the Avi River Stampede PRCA Rodeo (Fort Mohave, Arizona), the Texas Stampede (Allen), the State Fair of Louisiana Pro Rodeo (Shreveport), the Austin County Fair and Rodeo (Bellville, Texas) and the Odessa Rodeo Festival (Tampa, Florida); She was the co-champion at the Sandhills Stock Show and Rodeo (Odessa, Texas) and the NILE Pro Rodeo (Billings, Montana). Babyflo performed so well that she was named PRCA/WPRA AQHA Barrel Racing Horse of the Year.

=== Season 2014 ===
She won her first WPRA World Champion title after winning $276,441 in 2014; she finished second in the Average at the NFR with a total time of 145.10 on ten runs; she placed in 8 out of 10 rounds winning Rd. 1 and 4; she won a total of $144,970 at the NFR; she won the Tri-State Rodeo (Amarillo, Texas), the Dayton (Iowa) Championship Rodeo, the Crossett (Arkansas) Riding Club 66th Annual PRCA Rodeo, the Black Hills Roundup (Belle Fourche, South Dakota), the Pioneer Days Rodeo (Clovis, New Mexico), the Southwestern International PRCA Rodeo (El Paso, Texas), the Silverton (Texas) Buck Wild Days Rodeo, the Canyonlands PRCA Rodeo (Moab, Utah), the Clovis (California) Rodeo, the Rio Grande Valley Livestock Show and Rodeo (Mercedes, Texas), Parada Del Sol (Scottsdale, Arizona), Avi River Stampede (Fort Mohave, Arizona) and the Leesville (Louisiana) Lions Club Rodeo. This year Taylor won the NFR, her first and only time so far. In the third round, she started wearing a helmet, which gave her a confidence boost.

=== Season 2015 ===
She won the Rowell Ranch Rodeo in Castro Valley, California. She placed second at the Helotes Festival in Helotes, Texas. She placed second at the Champions Challenge in Logandale, Nevada. Taylor's earnings for the 2015 season are $187,578. Of that, $90,750 was earned in the 2015 NFR. She placed 6th in the World Standings that year. She placed in seven of ten rounds at the NFR. She placed 10th of 15 barrel racers in the NFR Finals.

=== Career summary ===
As of 2016, Taylor had earned $903,647 in her career. She has one World Barrel Racing Championship in 2014. She qualified for the NFR in 1995, 1996, 1997, 1998, 2013, 2014, and 2015. Taylor and her horse became the third world champions to win a title who start by going to the left barrel rather than the right barrel. Ardith Bruce and Red won going to the left in 1964; and Lindsay Sears and Martha won twice in 2008 and 2011 going to the left.

=== Season 2017 ===
Taylor competed in 20 rodeos this season and was in the top 52 in the World Standings.

Taylor competed another time at the Fort Worth Stock Show and Rodeo in 2017 having never won this rodeo before. It's one of the biggest rodeos on the PRCA circuit, and everyone wants to win this one. Taylor claimed the second round with a great run. Then she came into the Championship Run on Saturday night, February 4, in a close race, to win it with a tad more than 2/10s of a second lead over the nearest competitor. When it was Taylor's turn to run, the best time was 16.8 seconds. Taylor and Babyflo managed to run it in at 16.62 seconds to take the lead and win the event. Taylor pocketed more than $16,000 during her stay in Fort Worth.

== Awards ==
- 7 NFR Qualifications
- 2013-2015 Jerry Ann Taylor Best Dressed Award at NFR
- 2014 Women's Professional Rodeo Association (WPRA) Barrel Racing World Champion
- 2018 American Quarter Horse Association (AQHA) Barrel Racing World Champion
- 2019 Thoroughbred Makeover Barrel Racing Champion
- 2024 Texas Cowboy Hall of Fame
- 2024 Texas Rodeo Cowboy Hall of Fame

== Horses ==
Flo's Heiress is nicknamed BabyFlo. BabyFlo is a 14-year-old Chestnut mare as of 2020. BabyFlo is 14.2 hands and was born and raised on Taylor's ranch. She is by Dr. Nick Bar and out of Flowers and Money.

- 2013 PRCA/WPRA AQHA Barrel Racing Horse of the Year
- 2012 PRCA/WPRA AQHA Reserve Barrel Racing Horse of the Year

Flos Nick Nack. Flos Nick Nack is a 16-year-old mare as of 2020. She is by Dr. Nick Bar and out of Flowers and Money.

== Clothing line ==
In 2014, Taylor, her husband, and two of her friends started up clothing line Ranch Dress'n. They initially included rodeo apparel including jeans, T-shirts, and saddle accessories. Ranch Dress'n also sells athletic wear, caps, outerwear, and youth clothing.

== Filmography ==
- Four Kings - Britney - One Night Stand Off, TV series (2006)
- High Hopes - Bobbie (2006)
- The Rusty Trombone - Samantha (2006)
- The Loop, TV series (2006)
- Killing Time, video (2009)

== Personal life ==
Fallon currently resides in Whitesboro, Texas. She graduated from the University of North Texas. She first became known for unorthodox manner of dressing while competing and her jockey-like style of riding. However, her personality and style incurred many changes throughout the years. In 2012, Taylor married an NFL player from the Dallas Cowboys named Delbert Alvarado. She met him when the team came to town. Her uncle was a co-worker of his father. Alvarado had come to the ranch, and he asked her to show him around town. He encouraged her to try barrel racing again (she had just stopped using her collar). In 2015, Taylor's marriage to Alvarado came apart, and they got divorced. Taylor's social media following is one of the largest in rodeo, at about one-half million, whom she calls Flomies.
