= Cranmore, Sligo =

Housing development in Ireland

Cranmore An Crann Mór
- Housing development
- Location in Ireland
- Coordinates: 54°15′54″N 8°27′48″W
- Country: Ireland
- Province: Connacht
- County: County Sligo

Government
  - Dáil constituency: Sligo–Leitrim

Area
  - Total: 1.18125 km^{2} (0.45608 sq mi)
- Time zone: UTC+0 (WET)
  - Summer (DST): UTC-1 (IST (WEST))
- Area code: +353 71
- Irish Grid Reference: G685354

Cranmore (Irish: An Crann Mór, meaning 'the big tree') is a large local authority housing development in Sligo, Ireland, situated on the eastern side of the town. It is the largest housing estate in the west of Ireland with 511 houses, it was built in five phases from the early seventies to 1985. There are 246 houses owned by the local authority, a further 213 houses in private ownership and 52 houses built by the housing agency, Clúid.

Cranmore is made up of 15 blocks of houses or "drives" as they are known locally including:

Cranmore Place

Cranmore Drive

Cranmore Villas

O'Dwyer Court (demolished 2009)

Devins Drive

Geldof Drive

McNeill Drive

Langan Drive

Racecourse View (originally Banks Drive)

Carroll Drive

Benson Drive (demolished 2009)

Yeats Drive

Collery Drive

John Fallon Drive

Joe McDonnell Drive.

The estate has two main access points with entrances from the Cranmore road to the north and Cleveragh road to the south, it also has/had walking entrances on:

Cranmore Place (now a storage site for builders)

Joe McDonnell Drive (recently rebuilt with adjacent house)

Collery Drive

There has always been a small crime problem on the estate with car theft, muggings and breaking and entering the most common; this has led to the installation of 10 CCTV cameras funded by the RAPID program located around the estate for crime prevention and there is often a Garda Síochána presence in the estate.

The estate has had three unsolved brutal murders in recent times including two men gunned down and the third attacked with a hatchet.

Houses of known drug dealers and criminals on the estate have been subject to gun attacks.

There have been numerous drug seizures by Gardaí throughout the area's history.

== Population ==
With approximately 494 occupied houses and a population of between 1,600 and 1,700, Cranmore is as large as county Sligo's second and third largest towns, the estate having a larger population than both Ballymote (with 1,229) and Tubbercurry (with 1,171). It has been over 30 years since the first houses were completed and in that time it has become one of the largest estates west of the Shannon.

These figures are based on the following: East Ward population (2006 Census): 5,334. Electorate [All those over the age of 18] of East Ward (2009 Register of Electors): 4,445 of which 941 are registered in Cranmore Estate.

== Sport ==
The Cranmore area has two soccer pitches, Sean Fallon Park and Ray McSharry Park, which are home to local teams Abbey United, City United, City Gaels and the Sligo Leitrim League. There are also basketball and tennis courts, however these are in a dilapidated state. The area is next to the Mercy College which facilities include indoor basketball courts, running track and camogie pitch and Cranmore is located near the Sligo Racecourse and Sligo Sports Complex.

The Community Sport Development Officer has worked closely with the Cranmore Regeneration Project and the Resource House Project to develop new sport and recreation programmes for young people in the area.

== Community ==
Cranmore has a strong community with many clubs and projects. Cranmore Community Cooperative Society are the official voice for the Cranmore People in the regeneration process, they run many activities including a youth club as well as host various community education programmes and events. Other groups include Cranmore/Abbeyquarter Centre, City United Football club, ABQ Men's groups, two women's groups, a senior citizens club and 10 resident associations.

== Street Names ==
The street names within Cranmore honour both local and national figures, who include:

- John Fallon (John Fallon Drive) who was a member of the local council and once was mayor of Sligo, his son Sean Fallon was a Celtic F.C. legend.
- William Butler Yeats (Yeats Drive) who was a famous Irish poet and spent most of his childhood in Sligo.
- Joe McDonnell (Joe McDonnell Drive) was a volunteer in the Provisional Irish Republican Army (IRA), and who died in the 1981 Irish hunger strike.
- Bob Geldof (Geldof Drive) is an Irish singer, songwriter, actor and political activist who organised Live Aid and Live 8
