= John Fallon Colohan =

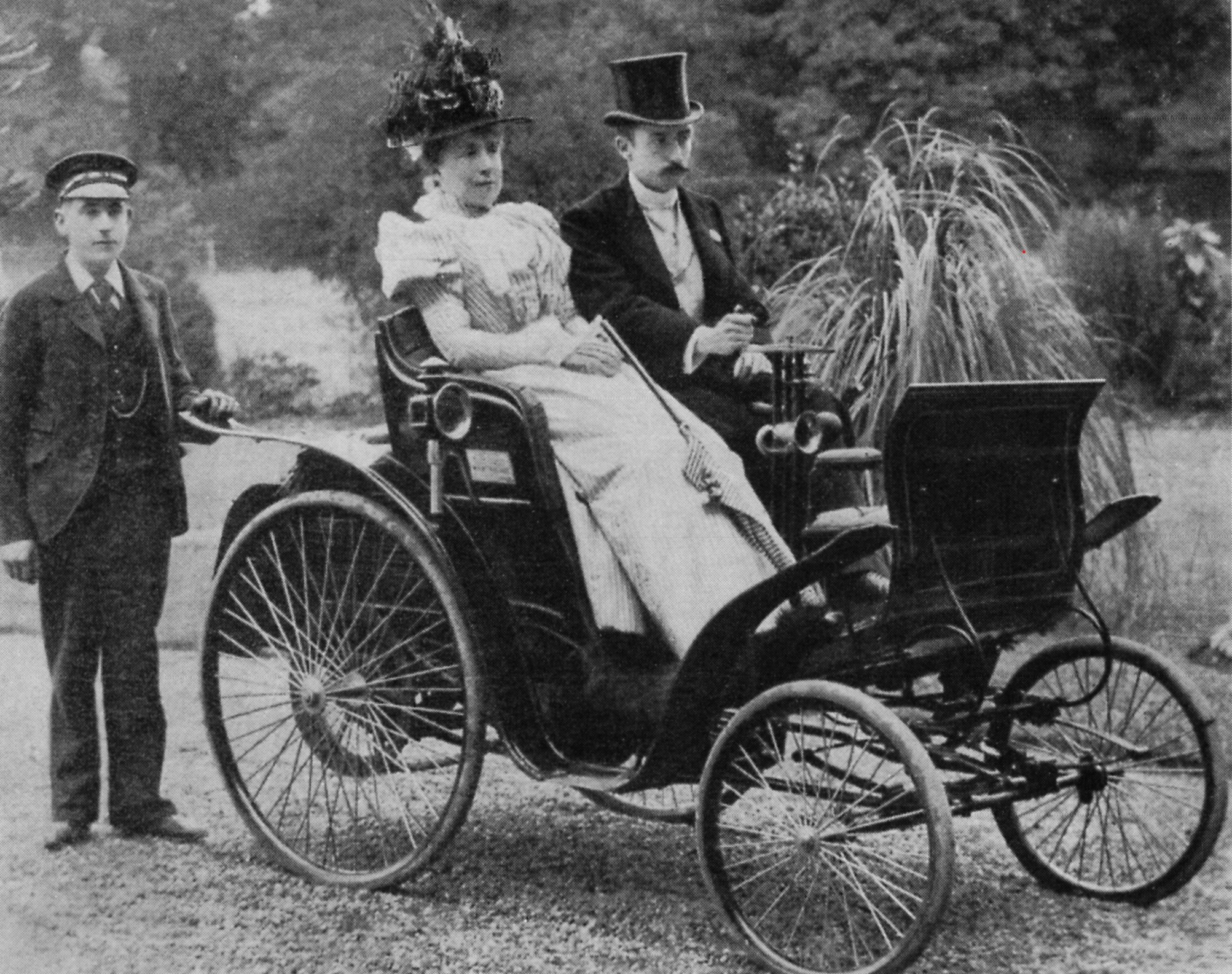
John Colohan, with his first wife and valet, in a Benz Velo motorcar, outside his home in Blackrock County Dublin c. 1898

John Fallon Colohan (c. 1862 – 27 August 1932) was an Irish physician who, in the late 1890s, imported the first petrol-powered car into Ireland. (Note: The first car imported into Ireland may have been a steam-powered (French) Gardner-Serpollet, imported by John Brown of Belfast in 1896. Other sources suggest that John Malcolm Gillies, editor of the Freeman's Journal, imported a (German) Benz car later in 1896. Colohan's purchase is sometimes dated to 1896 or 1897. Other sources suggest that Colohan's Benz Velo was an 1898 model.) Described in a number of sources as "Ireland's first motorist", he was a founder member of the Irish Automobile Club.

== Early life and education ==
Colohan was born in Dublin c. 1862. (Note: While the Dictionary of Irish Biography gives a date of birth in 1862, other sources (including the 1901 census record) support a date in 1864 or 1865.) A Roman Catholic, his father was the manager of the Hibernian Bank in Dublin, and he was a relative of the songwriter Arthur Colahan. He studied medicine at Edinburgh Medical School, qualifying as a physician and surgeon in 1892. He practised in London, Long Ditton, Dublin, and Athenry. He also reputedly studied motor engineering in Germany and learned how to drive in France.

== Motoring ==
In c. 1897, Colohan imported what is reputed to be the first petrol-engined motorcar into Ireland, an 1896 Benz Velo Comfortable. He won a bet (a wager of £50), in 1899, by driving from his home in Blackrock, Dublin to Kilbeggan, County Westmeath, and back again, in under 12 hours.

In 1901, he placed an order for a four-cylinder 24 horsepower (18 kW) Daimler, which he "boosted to near 30 hp" to make it the largest and "most powerful car in the country" at the time. Involved in motor racing and touring in Ireland, he negotiated with the Automobile Club of Great Britain and Ireland to form the (Royal) Irish Automobile Club in 1901, becoming a founder and committee member. He was involved in bringing the 1903 Gordon Bennett Cup to Ireland.

Colohan had ceased practicing medicine by 1903 and became a controlling partner in a coachbuilding company in Dublin. He promoted the company's expansion into a motoring engineering works and stockist. He left this company in 1908, due to ill health, and bought the Grand Hotel in Malahide.

== Later life and death ==
Colohan, who was married and widowed twice, left Ireland and moved to England in 1922. He lived near Marlowe on Thames in Berkshire, where he became known as an eccentric and for his indulgence in alcohol. He died at his home, Dean Cottage, at Cookham Dean, in August 1932. He left the majority of his estate, £15,171 (equivalent to £916,000 in 2025), to his valet of 13 years, whom Colohan described as like a son to him.

Colohan's first car, a Benz Velo, was purchased and restored in the 1980s, and, as of 2017, was on display (as part of a private collection) in Dublin. An 1890s photograph of the car, including Colohan and his first wife, was represented on an Irish postage stamp in 1989.
