= Fallon Kelly =

American judge (1907–1992)

L. Fallon Kelly (September 13, 1907 – June 19, 1992) was a justice of the Minnesota Supreme Court from July 6, 1970 to July 6, 1980. He received his undergraduate and law degrees from the University of Minnesota. He also served as United States Attorney for Minnesota during the Eisenhower administration.
