= Electoral results for the Division of Hinkler =

Australian division election results

This is a list of electoral results for the Division of Hinkler in Australian federal elections from the division's creation in 1984 until the present.

== Members ==
Member	Party	Term
Bryan Conquest	National	1984–1987
Brian Courtice	Labor	1987–1993
Paul Neville	National	1993–2010
Paul Neville	Liberal National	2010–2013
Keith Pitt	Liberal National	2013–2025

== Election results ==
=== Elections in the 2020s ===
==== 2025 ====
2025 Australian federal election: Hinkler
Party	Candidate	Votes	%	±%
Liberal National	David Batt	41,569	38.01	−4.12
Labor	Trish Mears	34,104	31.18	+7.87
One Nation	Tyler Carman	14,498	13.26	+4.55
Greens	Andrew McLean	8,000	7.31	+1.83
Trumpet of Patriots	Robert Blohberger	4,220	3.86	+3.86
Family First	Kerry Petrus	3,778	3.45	+3.45
Independent	Michael O'Brien	3,201	2.93	+2.93
Total formal votes		109,370	95.37	−1.36
Informal votes		5,307	4.63	+1.36
Turnout		114,677	89.80	+0.31
Two-party-preferred result
Liberal National	David Batt	61,534	56.26	−3.81
Labor	Trish Mears	47,836	43.74	+3.81
Liberal National hold		Swing	−3.81	

==== 2022 ====
2022 Australian federal election: Hinkler
Party	Candidate	Votes	%	±%
Liberal National	Keith Pitt	42,720	42.13	−3.90
Labor	Jason Scanes	23,634	23.31	+0.38
Independent	Jack Dempsey	13,236	13.05	+13.05
One Nation	Zak Menhennett	8,837	8.71	−6.09
United Australia	Kristie Nash	7,417	7.31	+2.93
Greens	Andrew McLean	5,562	5.48	+1.76
Total formal votes		101,406	96.73	+4.55
Informal votes		3,431	3.27	−4.55
Turnout		104,837	89.49	−3.21
Two-party-preferred result
Liberal National	Keith Pitt	60,918	60.07	−4.43
Labor	Jason Scanes	40,488	39.93	+4.43
Liberal National hold		Swing	−4.43	

Alluvial diagram for preference flows in the seat of Hinkler in the 2022 federal election. indicates at what stage the winning candidate had over 50% of the votes and was declared the winner.

=== Elections in the 2010s ===
==== 2019 ====
2019 Australian federal election: Hinkler
Party	Candidate	Votes	%	±%
Liberal National	Keith Pitt	42,374	46.03	+2.24
Labor	Richard Pascoe	21,110	22.93	−3.76
One Nation	Damian Huxham	13,625	14.80	−4.36
United Australia	Joseph Ellul	4,029	4.38	+4.38
Greens	Anne Jackson	3,422	3.72	−0.23
Independent	Moe Turaga	2,583	2.81	+2.81
Conservative National	Aaron Erskine	1,471	1.60	+1.60
Animal Justice	Amy Byrnes	1,391	1.51	+1.51
Independent	David Norman	1,327	1.44	+1.44
Independent	Adrian Wone	735	0.80	+0.80
Total formal votes		92,067	92.18	−3.24
Informal votes		7,810	7.82	+3.24
Turnout		99,877	92.70	+0.50
Two-party-preferred result
Liberal National	Keith Pitt	59,384	64.50	+6.12
Labor	Richard Pascoe	32,683	35.50	−6.12
Liberal National hold		Swing	+6.12	

==== 2016 ====
2016 Australian federal election: Hinkler
Party	Candidate	Votes	%	±%
Liberal National	Keith Pitt	38,887	43.86	−0.89
Labor	Tim Lawson	23,678	26.70	−0.90
One Nation	Damian Huxham	16,987	19.16	+19.16
Greens	Tim Roberts	3,477	3.92	+1.20
Family First	Stephen Lynch	2,250	2.54	+0.67
Independent	Bill Foster	1,720	1.94	+1.94
Liberty Alliance	Robert Windred	1,670	1.88	+1.88
Total formal votes		88,669	95.42	+0.34
Informal votes		4,258	4.58	−0.34
Turnout		92,927	92.29	−2.24
Two-party-preferred result
Liberal National	Keith Pitt	51,804	58.42	−0.62
Labor	Tim Lawson	36,865	41.58	+0.62
Liberal National hold		Swing	−0.62	

==== 2013 ====
2013 Australian federal election: Hinkler
Party	Candidate	Votes	%	±%
Liberal National	Keith Pitt	38,005	44.75	−10.20
Labor	Leanne Donaldson	23,442	27.60	−4.90
Palmer United	Rob Messenger	14,990	17.65	+17.65
Katter's Australian	David Dalgleish	3,887	4.58	+4.58
Greens	Mark Simpson	2,308	2.72	−2.99
Family First	Troy Sullivan	1,590	1.87	−1.30
Independent	Reid Schirmer	706	0.83	+0.83
Total formal votes		84,928	95.08	+0.65
Informal votes		4,399	4.92	−0.65
Turnout		89,327	94.58	+0.97
Two-party-preferred result
Liberal National	Keith Pitt	50,142	59.04	−1.35
Labor	Leanne Donaldson	34,786	40.96	+1.35
Liberal National hold		Swing	−1.35	

==== 2010 ====
2010 Australian federal election: Hinkler
Party	Candidate	Votes	%	±%
Liberal National	Paul Neville	44,382	54.95	+8.67
Labor	Belinda McNeven	26,246	32.50	−10.57
Greens	Jenny Fitzgibbon	4,611	5.71	+1.63
Family First	Trevor Versace	2,562	3.17	−0.37
Independent	Adrian Wone	1,698	2.10	+2.10
Independent	Cy D'Oliveira	1,264	1.57	+1.57
Total formal votes		80,763	94.43	−1.67
Informal votes		4,765	5.57	+1.67
Turnout		85,528	93.58	−0.89
Two-party-preferred result
Liberal National	Paul Neville	48,770	60.39	+8.87
Labor	Belinda McNeven	31,993	39.61	−8.87
Liberal National hold		Swing	+8.87	

=== Elections in the 2000s ===
==== 2007 ====
2007 Australian federal election: Hinkler
Party	Candidate	Votes	%	±%
National	Paul Neville	38,194	46.44	−2.12
Labor	Garry Parr	35,267	42.88	+8.91
Greens	Charles Dickes	3,383	4.11	+0.38
Family First	Cameron Rub	2,886	3.51	−0.63
Independent	Roy Wells	1,887	2.29	+0.67
Democrats	Robert Bromwich	632	0.77	−0.24
Total formal votes		82,249	96.09	+0.92
Informal votes		3,345	3.91	−0.92
Turnout		85,594	95.01	−0.43
Two-party-preferred result
National	Paul Neville	42,515	51.69	−6.65
Labor	Garry Parr	39,734	48.31	+6.65
National hold		Swing	−6.65	

==== 2004 ====
2004 Australian federal election: Hinkler
Party	Candidate	Votes	%	±%
National	Paul Neville	40,040	47.23	+6.62
Labor	Cheryl Dorron	33,167	39.13	+3.17
Family First	Cameron Rub	4,010	4.73	+4.73
Greens	Greg George	2,824	3.33	+0.83
Independent	Roy Wells	2,782	3.28	+3.28
Democrats	Alison Jensen	906	1.07	−0.78
Veterans	Tracey Zerk	734	0.87	+0.87
Citizens Electoral Council	Cindy Rolls	306	0.36	+0.30
Total formal votes		84,769	95.46	−0.04
Informal votes		4,033	4.54	+0.04
Turnout		88,802	94.61	−1.27
Two-party-preferred result
National	Paul Neville	46,458	54.81	+2.66
Labor	Cheryl Dorron	38,311	45.19	−2.66
National hold		Swing	+2.66	

==== 2001 ====
2001 Australian federal election: Hinkler
Party	Candidate	Votes	%	±%
National	Paul Neville	29,231	39.11	+2.53
Labor	Cheryl Dorron	28,483	38.13	−1.98
Independent	Peter Melville	7,147	9.56	+9.56
One Nation	Martin Janke	6,562	8.78	−10.21
Greens	Theresa Bates	1,904	2.55	+0.97
Democrats	Lisa White	1,393	1.87	−0.45
Total formal votes		74,720	95.56	−1.25
Informal votes		3,476	4.44	+1.25
Turnout		78,196	96.54	
Two-party-preferred result
National	Paul Neville	37,392	50.04	−0.30
Labor	Cheryl Dorron	37,328	49.96	+0.30
National hold		Swing	−0.30	

=== Elections in the 1990s ===
==== 1998 ====
1998 Australian federal election: Hinkler
Party	Candidate	Votes	%	±%
Labor	Cheryl Dorron	29,021	40.11	+1.86
National	Paul Neville	26,471	36.58	−16.07
One Nation	Marcus Ringuet	13,739	18.99	+18.99
Democrats	Lance Hall	1,677	2.32	−2.84
Greens	Roy Pearce	1,139	1.57	+1.54
Citizens Electoral Council	Cindy Rolls	309	0.43	+0.43
Total formal votes		72,356	96.82	−0.71
Informal votes		2,379	3.18	+0.71
Turnout		74,735	95.40	−0.06
Two-party-preferred result
National	Paul Neville	36,423	50.34	−7.60
Labor	Cheryl Dorron	35,933	49.66	+7.60
National hold		Swing	−7.60	

==== 1996 ====
1996 Australian federal election: Hinkler
Party	Candidate	Votes	%	±%
National	Paul Neville	43,497	55.47	+25.39
Labor	Brian Courtice	28,326	36.12	−6.79
Democrats	Taha Dabbagh	4,019	5.12	+1.11
Independent	Adrian Souterboek	1,820	2.32	+2.32
Indigenous Peoples	Colin Johnson	758	0.97	+0.63
Total formal votes		78,420	97.59	−0.26
Informal votes		1,938	2.41	+0.26
Turnout		80,358	95.47	−0.63
Two-party-preferred result
National	Paul Neville	47,233	60.36	+10.39
Labor	Brian Courtice	31,023	39.64	−10.39
National gain from Labor		Swing	+10.39	

==== 1993 ====
1993 Australian federal election: Hinkler
Party	Candidate	Votes	%	±%
Labor	Brian Courtice	33,162	42.80	−4.99
National	Paul Neville	23,447	30.26	−3.50
Liberal	John Abbott	9,767	12.61	+3.82
Confederate Action	Bill May	3,628	4.68	+4.68
Democrats	Terry Clark	3,044	3.93	−4.97
Citizens Electoral Council	Maurice Hetherington	2,732	3.53	+3.53
Greens	Lorrelle Campbell	1,451	1.87	+1.10
Indigenous Peoples	Colin Johnson	253	0.33	+0.33
Total formal votes		77,484	97.82	+0.06
Informal votes		1,732	2.18	−0.06
Turnout		79,207	96.09	
Two-party-preferred result
National	Paul Neville	38,897	50.22	+4.62
Labor	Brian Courtice	38,553	49.78	−4.62
National gain from Labor		Swing	+4.62	

==== 1990 ====
1990 Australian federal election: Hinkler
Party	Candidate	Votes	%	±%
Labor	Brian Courtice	32,995	47.3	−0.8
National	John Evans	23,453	33.7	−9.4
Democrats	Ronald Cullen	6,630	9.5	+6.3
Liberal	Frank Hibble	6,618	9.5	+3.9
Total formal votes		69,696	97.7	
Informal votes		1,620	2.3	
Turnout		71,316	96.1	
Two-party-preferred result
Labor	Brian Courtice	37,543	54.0	+2.9
National	John Evans	32,033	46.0	−2.9
Labor hold		Swing	+2.9	

=== Elections in the 1980s ===
==== 1987 ====
1987 Australian federal election: Hinkler
Party	Candidate	Votes	%	±%
Labor	Brian Courtice	30,814	48.1	+1.0
National	Bryan Conquest	27,665	43.1	−0.4
Liberal	John Williams	3,604	5.6	+0.6
Democrats	Geoff Boshell	2,039	3.2	−0.7
Total formal votes		64,122	97.4	
Informal votes		1,733	2.6	
Turnout		65,855	93.8	
Two-party-preferred result
Labor	Brian Courtice	32,753	51.1	+1.3
National	Bryan Conquest	31,367	48.9	−1.3
Labor gain from National		Swing	+1.3	

==== 1984 ====
1984 Australian federal election: Hinkler
Party	Candidate	Votes	%	±%
Labor	Brian Courtice	27,981	47.1	−0.8
National	Bryan Conquest	25,856	43.5	+1.2
Liberal	Ronald Owen	2,940	5.0	+0.0
Democrats	Frank Coulthard	2,322	3.9	+0.3
Independent	Marcus Platen	287	0.5	+0.5
Total formal votes		59,386	96.2	
Informal votes		2,319	3.8	
Turnout		61,705	94.0	
Two-party-preferred result
National	Bryan Conquest	29,798	50.2	+0.8
Labor	Brian Courtice	29,577	49.8	−0.8
National gain from Labor		Swing	+0.8	
