= Calavos, Queensland =

Calavos
- Suburb
- Interactive map of Calavos
- Coordinates: 24.9352°S 152.4297°E
- Country: Australia
- State: Queensland
- LGA: Bundaberg Region
- Location: 14.1 km (8.8 mi) SE of Bundaberg CBD; 110 km (68 mi) NW of Hervey Bay; 369 km (229 mi) N of Brisbane

Government
  - State electorate: Burnett
  - Federal division: Hinkler

Area
  - Total: 42.7 km^{2} (16.5 sq mi)

Population
  - Total: 359 (2021 census)
  - Density: 8.407/km^{2} (21.78/sq mi)
- Postcode: 4670
Suburbs around Calavos
Woongarra	Woongarra	Elliott Heads
Alloway	Calavos	Elliott Heads
Alloway	Kinkuna	Coonarr

Calavos is a rural locality in the Bundaberg Region, Queensland, Australia. In the 2021 census, Calavos had a population of 359 people.

== Geography ==
Calavos is low-lying farming land to the south of the city of Bundaberg. The Elliott River forms its southern boundary and the locality is well-watered by a number of creeks that are tributaries of the river. The predominant land use is growing sugarcane; there is a network of cane tramways to carry the harvest to the sugar mills.

There is a prawn farm operating on the northern bank of the river. Established in 1996, it produced its first harvest of black tiger prawns in 1997.

== Demographics ==
In the 2016 census, Calavos had a population of 331 people.

In the 2021 census, Calavos had a population of 359 people.

== Education ==
There are no schools in Calavos. The nearest government primary schools are:

- Alloway State School in neighbouring Alloway to the west
- Thabeban State School in Thabeban to the north-west
- Woongarra State School in neighbouring Woongarra to the north
- Elliott Heads State School in neighbouring Elliott Heads to the east

The nearest government secondary schools are Bundaberg State High School in Bundaberg South to the north-west and Kepnock State High School in Kepnock to the north.

== Attractions ==
Joseph Coonan Lookout is in the Fallon Rocks Reserve on Fallon Rocks Road by the Elliott River (24.9519°S 152.4583°E). It is near the site of one of the first fishing huts along the bank of the Elliott River, which was built by Joseph Coonan in the 1920s.
