= Coonarr, Queensland =

Coonarr
- Suburb
- Interactive map of Coonarr
- Coordinates: 24.9666°S 152.4705°E
- Country: Australia
- State: Queensland
- LGA: Bundaberg Region
- Location: 22.7 km (14.1 mi) SE of Bundaberg CBD; 366 km (227 mi) N of Brisbane

Government
  - State electorate: Burnett
  - Federal division: Hinkler

Area
  - Total: 23.4 km^{2} (9.0 sq mi)

Population
  - Total: 257 (2021 census)
  - Density: 10.98/km^{2} (28.45/sq mi)
- Time zone: UTC+10:00 (AEST)
- Postcode: 4670
Suburbs around Coonarr
Calavos	Elliott Heads	Coral Sea
Calavos	Coonarr	Coral Sea
Kinkuna	Kinkuna	Kinkuna

Coonarr is a coastal locality in the Bundaberg Region, Queensland, Australia. In the 2021 census, Coonarr had a population of 257 people.

== Demographics ==
In the 2016 census, Coonarr had a population of 253 people.

In the 2021 census, Coonarr had a population of 257 people.

== Education ==
There are no schools in Coonarr. The nearest government primary school is Alloway State School in Alloway to the west. The nearest government secondary school is Bundaberg State High School in Bundaberg South to the north-west.
