= 1987 Australian House of Representatives election =

1987 Australian federal election
- 11 July 1987

All 148 seats in the House of Representatives 75 seats were needed for a majority in the House All 76 seats in the Senate
- Registered: 10,353,213 ▲4.90%
- Turnout: 9,715,440 (93.84%) (▼0.35 pp)
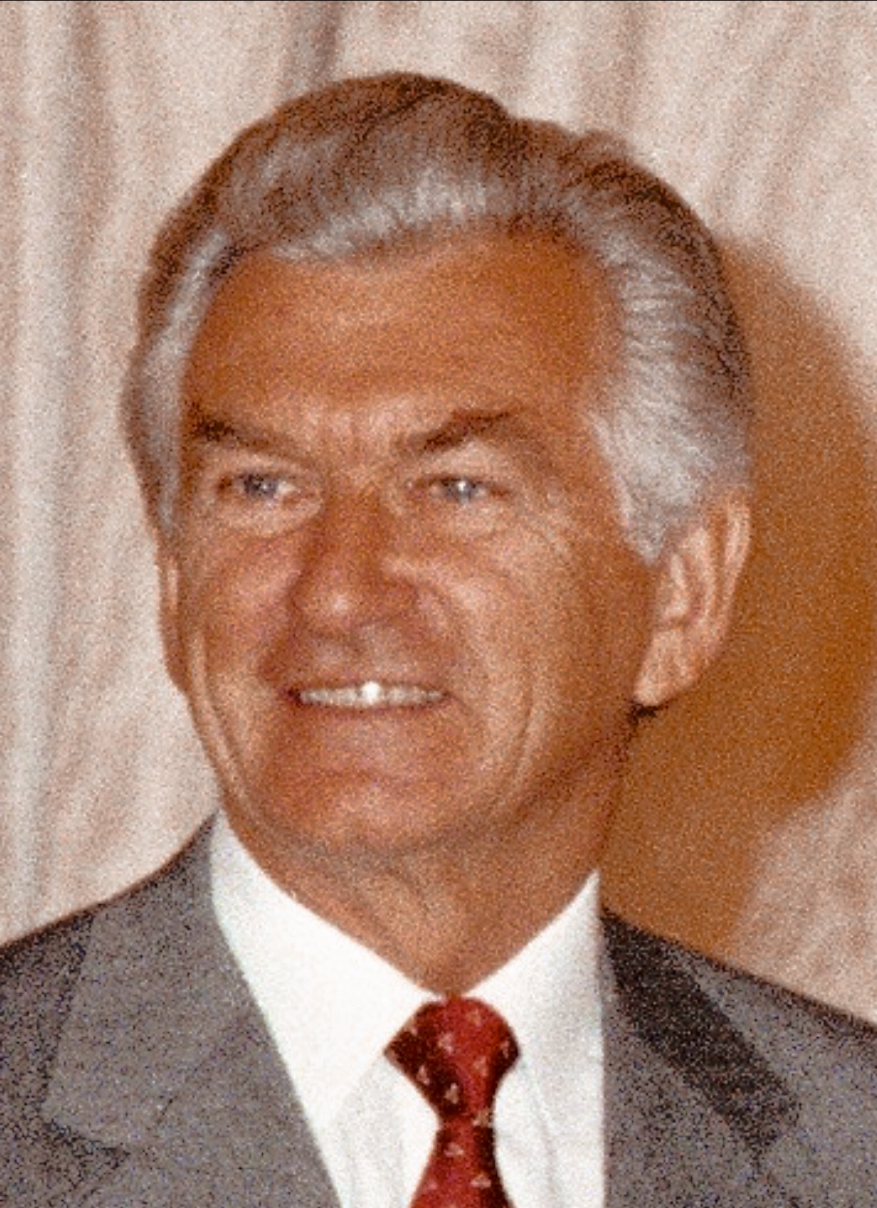

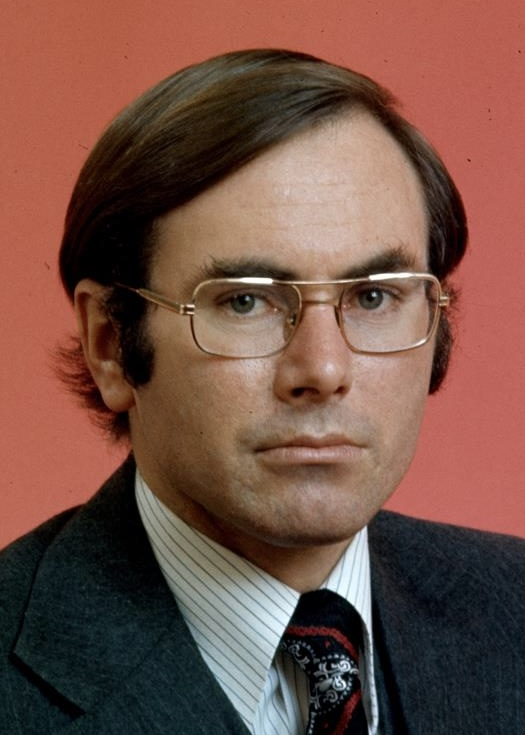

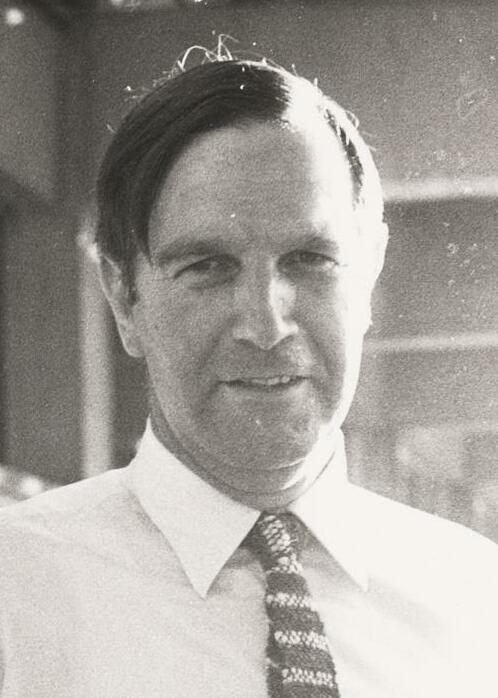
	First party	Second party	Third party
Leader	Bob Hawke	John Howard	Ian Sinclair
Party	Labor	Liberal	National
Leader since	8 February 1983	5 September 1985	17 January 1984
Leader's seat	Wills (Vic.)	Bennelong (NSW)	New England (NSW)
Last election	82 seats	45 seats (Note: Includes Country Liberal Party)	21 seats
Seats won	86 seats	43 seats	19 seats
Seat change	▲4	▼2	▼2
Popular vote	4,238,663	3,169,061	1,048,249
Percentage	45.90%	34.32%	11.35%
Swing	▼1.65%	▲0.26%	▲0.72%
TPP	50.83%	49.17%
TPP swing	▼0.94	▲0.94
- Results by division for the House of Representatives, shaded by winning party's margin of victory.
Prime Minister before election
Bob Hawke
Labor
Subsequent Prime Minister
Bob Hawke
Labor

The following tables show results for the Australian House of Representatives at the 1987 federal election held on 11 July 1987.

== Australia ==
House of Reps (IRV) — 1987–90 – Turnout 93.84% (CV) — Informal 4.94%
Party	Votes	%	Swing	Seats	Change
Labor	4,238,663	45.90	−1.65	86	▲4
Liberal	3,169,061	34.32	+0.26	43	▼1
National	1,048,249	11.35	+0.72	19	▼2
Country Liberal	21,668	0.23	−0.09	0	▼1
Democrats	557,262	6.00	+0.55		
Unite Australia	14,593	0.16	+0.16		
NT Nationals	10,273	0.11	+0.11		
Nuclear Disarmament	9,735	0.11	–0.10		
Family Movement	4,065	0.04	+0.04		
Pensioner	3,346	0.04	+0.02		
Democratic Labor	3,334	0.04	–0.53		
Socialist Workers	1,097	0.01	–0.10		
Communist	535	0.01	+0.00		
Independents	153,205	1.66	+0.62		
Total	9,235,086			148	
Two-party-preferred vote
Labor	4,693,099	50.83	−0.94	86	▲4
Liberal–National Coalition	4,540,009	49.17	+0.94	62	▼4
Invalid/blank votes	480,354	4.9	–1.9		
Turnout	9,715,440	93.8			
Registered voters	10,353,229				
Source: Federal Election Results 1949-1993

== States ==
=== New South Wales ===
1987 Australian federal election (New South Wales)
- 11 July 1987

All 51 New South Wales seats in the Australian House of Representatives and all 12 seats in the Australian Senate
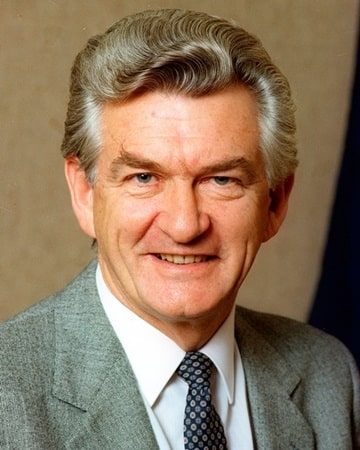

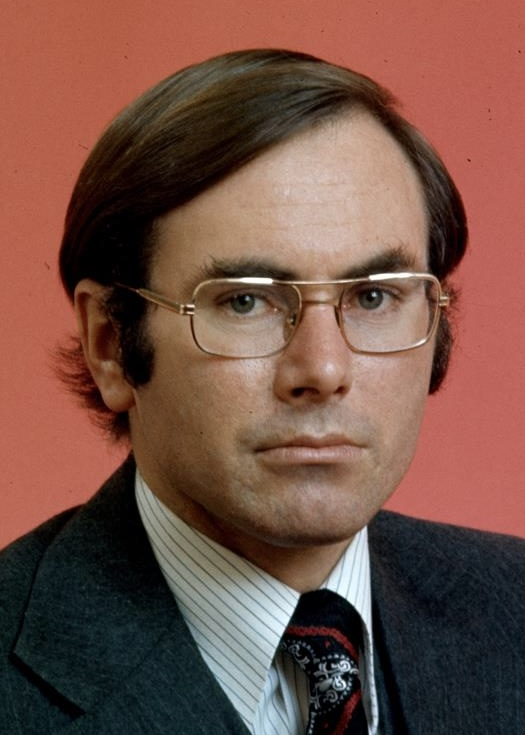
	First party	Second party
Leader	Bob Hawke	John Howard
Party	Labor	Liberal/National coalition
Last election	29 seats	22 seats
Seats won	28 seats	23 seats
Seat change	▼1	▲1
Popular vote	1,438,985	1,435,070
Percentage	45.2%	45.1%
Swing	▼3.1	▲1.8
TPP	50.29%	49.71%
TPP swing	▼2.62	▲2.62

Turnout 93.9% (CV) — Informal 4.6%
Party	Votes	%	Swing	Seats	Change
Liberal	1,059,597	33.26	+0.5	13	▲1
National	375,443	11.78	+1.25	10	Steady
Liberal/National Coalition	1,435,040	45.04	+1.74	23	▲1
Labor	1,438,985	45.17	–3.09	28	▼1
Democrats	201,924	6.34	+0.43		
Independent	106,999	3.36	+1.19		
Unite Australia	1,837	0.06	+0.06		
Nuclear Disarmament	1,105	0.03	+0.18		
Total	3,185,920			51	
Two-party-preferred vote
Labor	1,602,013	50.29	–2.62		▼1
Liberal/National Coalition	1,583,465	49.71	+2.62		▲1
Invalid/blank votes	152,696	4.6	–1.6		
Turnout	3,338,616	93.9			
Registered voters	3,555,061				
Source: Psephos Adam Carr's Election Archive 1987

=== Victoria ===
1987 Australian federal election (Victoria)
- 11 July 1987

All 39 Victoria seats in the Australian House of Representatives and all 12 seats in the Australian Senate
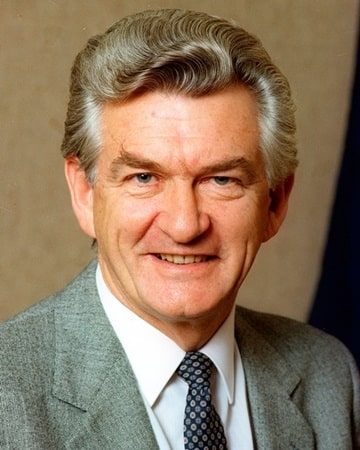

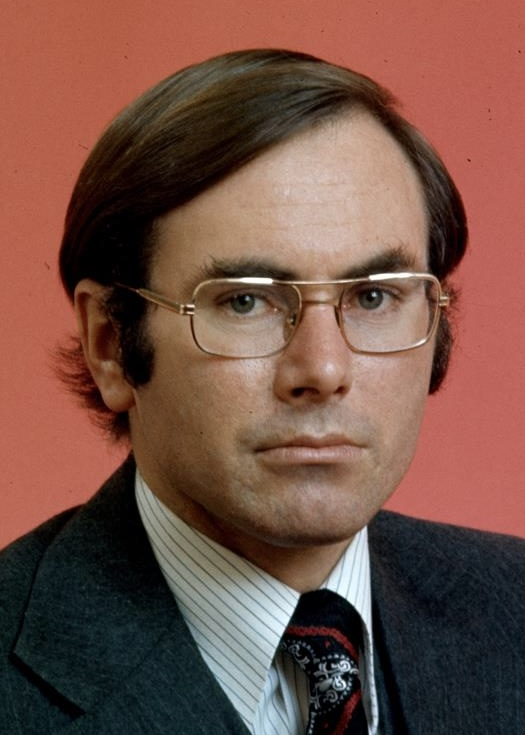
	First party	Second party
Leader	Bob Hawke	John Howard
Party	Labor	Liberal/National coalition
Last election	25	14 seats
Seats won	24 seats	15 seats
Seat change	▼1	▲1
Popular vote	1,139,437	1,076,408
Percentage	46.9%	44.3%
Swing	▼3.0	▲1.2
TPP	52.31%	47.69%
TPP swing	▼0.78	▲0.78

Turnout 94.9% (CV) — Informal 5.2%
Party	Votes	%	Swing	Seats	Change
Liberal	922,680	38.02	1.14	12	▲1
National	154,088	6.35	–0.02	3	Steady
Liberal/National Coalition	1,076,768	44.37	1.13	15	▲1
Labor	1,139,337	46.95	–1.99	24	▼1
Democrats	163,160	6.72	0.35		
Independent	34,491	1.42	–0.73		
Unite Australia	5,427	0.22			
Pensioner	3,346	0.14	0.02		
Democratic Labor	3,334	0.14	–4.90		
Socialist Workers	1,097	0.04	–0.02		
Total	2,426,960			39	
Two-party-preferred vote
Labor	1,268,894	52.31	–0.78	24	▼1
Liberal/National Coalition	1,157,037	47.69	+0.78	15	▲1
Invalid/blank votes	134,415	5.25	–2.95		
Turnout	2,561,375	95.1			
Registered voters	2,698,034				
Source: Psephos Adam Carr's Election Archive 1987

=== Queensland ===
1987 Australian federal election (Queensland)
- 11 July 1987

All 39 Queensland seats in the Australian House of Representatives and all 12 seats in the Australian Senate
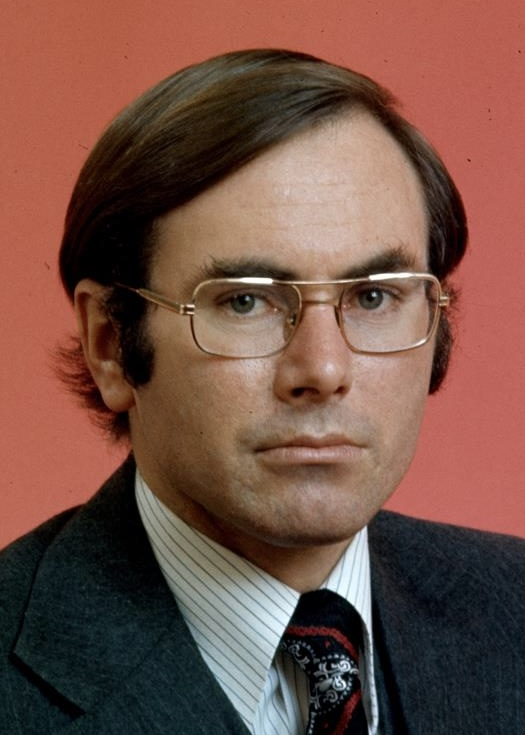

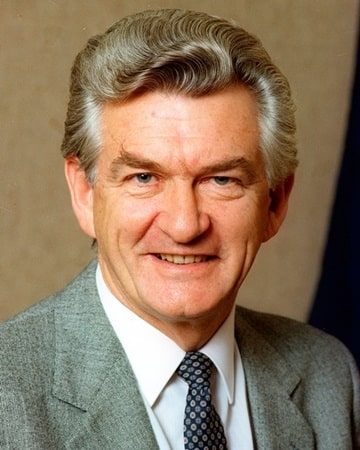
	First party	Second party
Leader	John Howard	Bob Hawke
Party	Liberal/National coalition	Labor
Last election	15 seats	9
Seats won	11 seats	13 seats
Seat change	▼4	▲4
Popular vote	758,234	683,640
Percentage	49.9%	45.0%
Swing	▼1.0	▲0.9
TPP	50.7%	49.3%
TPP swing	▼1.61	▲1.61

Turnout 92.2% (CV) — Informal 3.4%
Party	Votes	%	Swing	Seats	Change
National	438,627	28.85	-2.85	6	▼2
Liberal	319,607	21.02	1.86	5	▼2
Liberal/National Coalition	758,234	49.87	-0.99	11	▼4
Labor	683,640	44.96	0.90	13	▲4
Democrats	74,215	4.88	0.06		
Independent	2,684	0.18	-0.04		
Nuclear Disarmament	1,718	0.11	0.00		
Total	1,520,491			24	
Two-party-preferred vote
Labor	749,834	49.32	49.32	13	▲4
Liberal/National Coalition	770,515	50.68	49.32	11	▼4
Invalid/blank votes	53,622	3.41	-1.19		
Turnout	1,574,113	92.18			
Registered voters	1,707,701				
Source: Psephos Adam Carr's Election Archive 1987

=== Western Australia ===
1987 Australian federal election (Western Australia)
- 11 July 1987

All 13 Western Australia seats in the Australian House of Representatives and all 12 seats in the Australian Senate
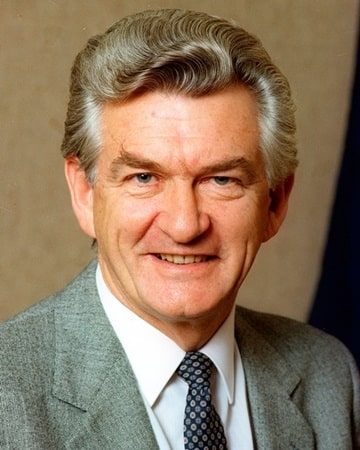

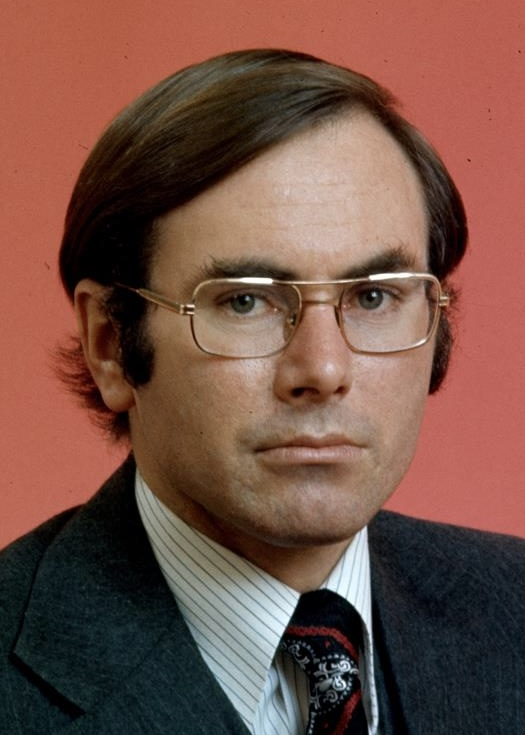
	First party	Second party
Leader	Bob Hawke	John Howard
Party	Labor	Liberal/National coalition
Last election	9 seats	4 seats
Seats won	9 seats	4 seats
Seat change	Steady	Steady
Popular vote	377,493	387,137
Percentage	47.5%	48.7%
Swing	▼0.7	▲1.7
TPP	50.9%	49.1%
TPP swing	▼0.1	▲0.1

Turnout 92.2% (CV) — Informal 3.4%
Party	Votes	%	Swing	Seats	Change
Liberal	332,266	41.79	-3.95	4	Steady
National	54,871	6.90	5.59		Steady
Liberal/National Coalition	387,137	48.69	1.64	4	Steady
Labor	377,493	47.48	-0.71	9	Steady
Democrats	27,302	3.43	-0.27		
Independents	3,112	0.39	-0.12		
Total	795,044			13	
Two-party-preferred vote
Labor	404,751	50.91	-0.05	9	Steady
Liberal/National Coalition	390,232	49.09	0.05	4	Steady
Invalid/blank votes	55,776	6.56	-0.86		
Turnout	850,820	93.84			
Registered voters	906,677				
Source: Psephos Adam Carr's Election Archive 1987

=== South Australia ===
1987 Australian federal election (South Australia)
- 11 July 1987

All 13 South Australia seats in the Australian House of Representatives and all 12 seats in the Australian Senate
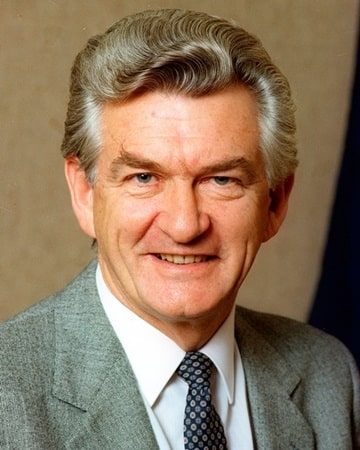

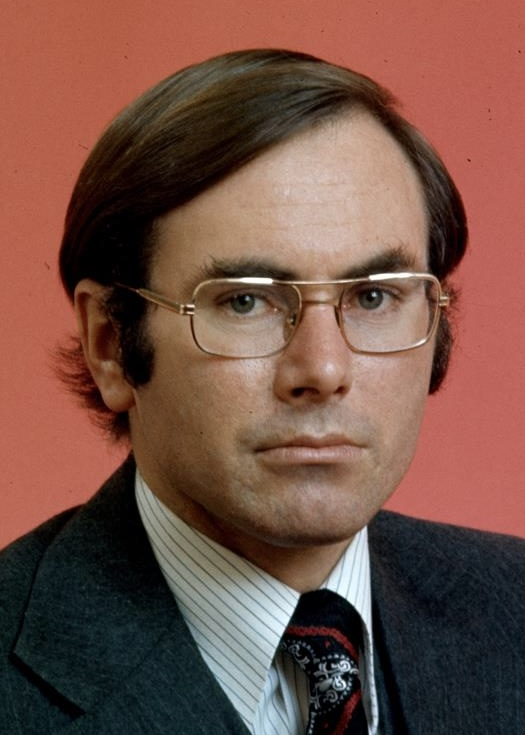
	First party	Second party
Leader	Bob Hawke	John Howard
Party	Labor	Liberal/National coalition
Last election	9 seats	5 seats
Seats won	8 seats	5 seats
Seat change	Steady	Steady
Popular vote	367,045	381,146
Percentage	44.6%	46.3%
Swing	▼3.8	▲4.2
TPP	50.2%	49.8%
TPP swing	▼1.4	▲1.4

Turnout 93.8% (CV) — Informal 6.8%
Party	Votes	%	Swing	Seats	Change
Liberal	350,218	42.51	0.41	5	Steady
National	30,928	3.75	3.75		Steady
Liberal/National Coalition	381,146	46.26	4.16	5	Steady
Labor	367,045	44.55	-3.83	8	Steady
Democrats	64,163	7.79	0.85		
Unite Australia	7,329	0.89	0.00		
Independents	3,664	0.44	0.02		
Communist	535	0.06	0.00		
Total	823,882			13	
Two-party-preferred vote
Labor	413,827	50.24	-1.43	8	Steady
Liberal/National Coalition	409,828	49.76	1.43	5	Steady
Invalid/blank votes	60,536	6.84	-1.85		
Turnout	884,418	93.80			
Registered voters	942,885				
Source: Psephos Adam Carr's Election Archive 1987

=== Tasmania ===
1987 Australian federal election (Tasmania)
- 11 July 1987

All 5 Tasmania seats in the Australian House of Representatives and all 12 seats in the Australian Senate
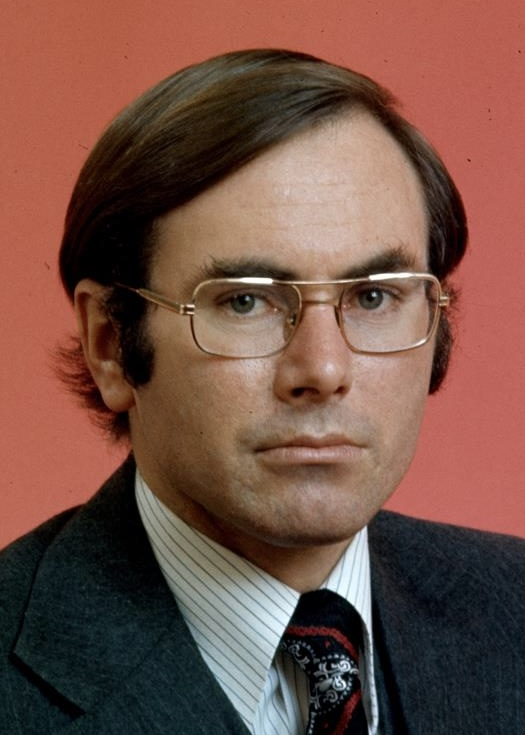

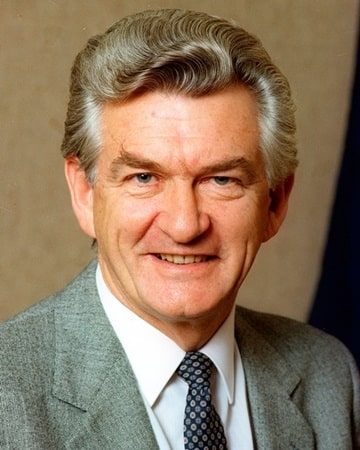
	First party	Second party
Leader	John Howard	Bob Hawke
Party	Liberal/National coalition	Labor
Last election	5 seats	0 seats
Seats won	4 seats	1 seat
Seat change	▼1	▲1
Popular vote	140,217	118,077
Percentage	51.1%	43.0%
Swing	▼0.1	▼0.4
TPP	53.1%	47.69%
TPP swing	▼0.27	▲0.27

Turnout 96.1% (CV) — Informal 4.8%
Party	Votes	%	Swing	Seats	Change
Liberal	140,217	51.05	-0.08	4	▼1
Labor	118,077	42.99	-0.43	1	▲1
Democrats	16,371	5.96	1.95		
Total	274,665			5	
Two-party-preferred vote
Liberal	145,830	53.10	-0.27	4	▼1
Labor	128,819	46.90	0.27	1	▲1
Invalid/blank votes	14,297	4.95	-0.92		
Turnout	288,962	96.08			
Registered voters	300,763				
Source: Psephos Adam Carr's Election Archive 1987

== Territories ==
=== Australian Capital Territory ===
1987 Australian federal election (Australian Capital Territory)
- 11 July 1987

Both Australian Capital Territory seats in the Australian House of Representatives and both seats in the Australian Senate
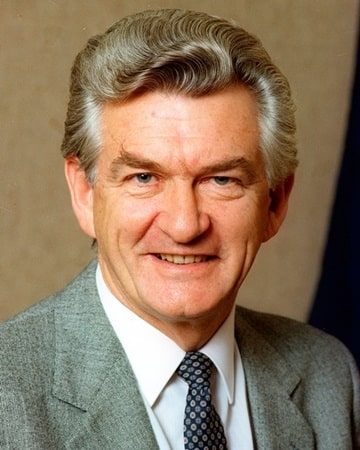

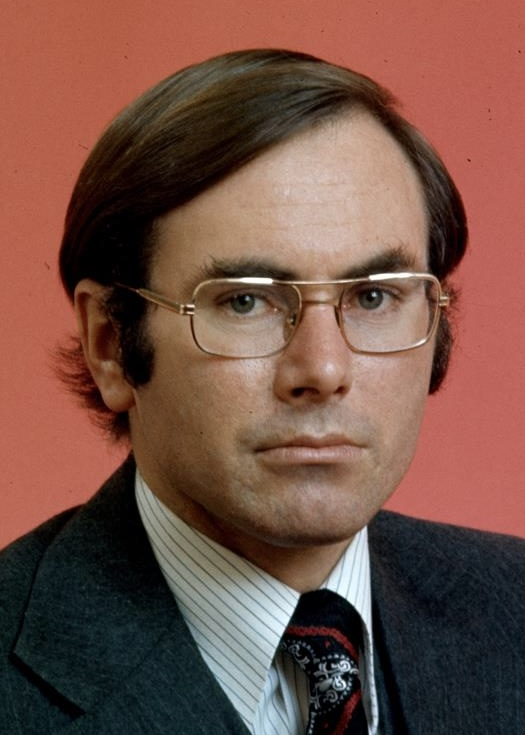
	First party	Second party
Leader	Bob Hawke	John Howard
Party	Labor	Coalition
Last election	2 seats	0 seats
Seats won	2	0
Seat change	Steady	Steady
Popular vote	79,791	44,806
Percentage	53.92%	30.28%
Swing	▲0.58	▼1.91
TPP	63.25%	38.04%
TPP swing	▲1.29	▼1.29

Turnout 94.1% (CV) — Informal 2.9%
Party	Votes	%	Swing	Seats	Change
Labor	79,791	53.92	0.58	2	Steady
Liberal	44,806	30.28	-1.91	0	Steady
Democrats	10,124	6.84	-0.77		
Nuclear Disarmament	6,912	4.67	0.99		
Family Movement	4,065	2.75	0.00		
Independent	2,290	1.55	0.48		
Total	147,988			2	
Two-party-preferred vote
Labor	93,575	63.25	1.29	2	Steady
Liberal	54,379	36.75	-1.29	0	Steady
Invalid/blank votes	5,328	3.48	-1.61		
Turnout	153,316	94.22			
Registered voters	162,717				
Source: Psephos Adam Carr's Election Archive 1987

=== Northern Territory ===
1987 Australian federal election (Northern Territory)
- 11 July 1987

The one Northern Territory seat in the Australian House of Representatives and both seats in the Australian Senate
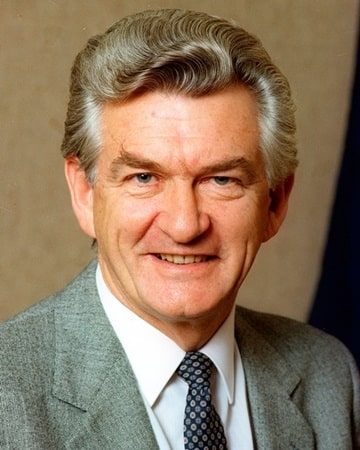

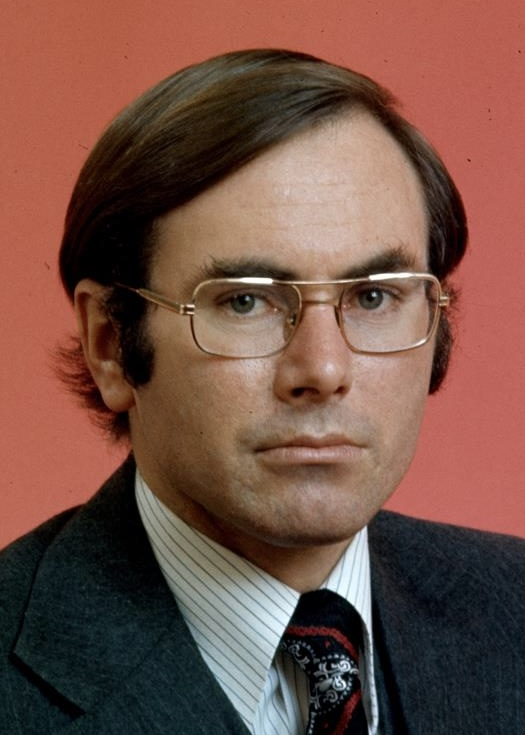
	First party	Second party
Leader	Bob Hawke	John Howard
Party	Labor	Coalition
Last election	0 seats	1 seat
Seats won	1	0
Seat change	▲1	▼1
Popular vote	28,195	21,668
Percentage	46.9%	36.0%
Swing	▲2.0	▼12.8
TPP	52.2%	47.8%
TPP swing	▲3.6	▼3.6

1987 Australian federal election: Northern Territory
Party	Candidate	Votes	%	±%
Labor	Warren Snowdon	28,195	46.9	+2.0
Country Liberal	Peter Paroulakis	21,668	36.0	−12.8
NT Nationals	Bob Liddle	10,273	17.1	+17.1
Total formal votes		60,136	94.2	
Informal votes		3,684	5.8	
Turnout		63,820	79.9	
Two-party-preferred result
Labor	Warren Snowdon	31,386	52.2	+3.6
Country Liberal	Peter Paroulakis	28,723	47.8	−3.6
Labor gain from Country Liberal		Swing	+3.6	

== See also ==
- Post-election pendulum for the 1987 Australian federal election
- Results of the 1987 Australian federal election (Senate)
- Members of the Australian House of Representatives, 1987–1990
