= Innes Park, Queensland =

Innes Park
- Town
- Interactive map of Innes Park
- Coordinates: 24.8661°S 152.4804°E
- Country: Australia
- State: Queensland
- LGA: Bundaberg Region
- Location: 7.3 km (4.5 mi) S of Bargara; 11.8 km (7.3 mi) E of Kepnock; 15.1 km (9.4 mi) E of Bundaberg Central; 367 km (228 mi) N of Brisbane

Government
  - State electorate: Burnett
  - Federal division: Hinkler

Area
  - Total: 10.1 km^{2} (3.9 sq mi)

Population
  - Total: 2,653 (2021 census locality)
  - Density: 262.7/km^{2} (680/sq mi)
- Time zone: UTC+10:00 (AEST)
- Postcode: 4670
Localities around Innes Park
Windermere	Bargara	Coral Sea
Woongarra	Innes Park	Coral Sea
Woongarra	Elliott Heads	Coral Cove

Innes Park is a coastal town and locality in the Bundaberg Region, Queensland, Australia. The town is 367 kilometres (228 mi) north of the state capital, Brisbane. In the 2021 census, the locality of Innes Park had a population of 2,653 people.

== Geography ==
Innes Park residential area is located on a low rocky section of the coast with two small beaches either side. The northern beach is 400 metres long and has a high tide sand beach fronted by a mixture of sand and boulders at low tide. There is good road access at the southern end, with a small foredune behind the beach and a now stable sand blow at the northern end. The southern Innes Park Beach (24.8661°S 152.4831°E) straddles the mouth of Palmer Creek (24.8711°S 152.4832°E). It is 400 metres long and consists of a narrow strip of high tide sand fronted by a continuous, sloping boulder field, with some sand in the small creek mouth. The beach is backed by a casuarina-covered foredune and a park with BBQs, children's playground, exercise facilities, beach volleyball court, public conveniences and car parks grouped at its southern end. All four beaches are only suitable for swimming toward high tide, with low tide generally revealing a rocky shoreline. Currents in and out of the creeks can be very strong mid-tide. There are various reef breaks along this coast, which need to be checked out with the locals. There is rock fishing the length of the coast, as well as in the small creek at Innes Park.

The foreshore is part of the Great Sandy Marine Park. As such, there are limits on some activities off shore. It is part of a turtle monitoring area and spearfishing, bait netting, crabbing, and line fishing are forbidden south of the mouth of Palmer Creek to past Barolin Rocks for 500m east of the low tide line.

== History ==
The Innes Park area was first occupied by European settlers in 1863, as part of the Barolin pastoral station. The Barolin House homestead, near Elliott Heads, about 4 kilometres (2 mi) south of Innes Park, was later built on the station. In 1912, the property was acquired by Sidney North Innes. In 1930, Innes and his wife Caroline donated land to the Shire of Woongarra for recreation purposes. Their son Sidney Burnett Innes later subdivided land for rural and residential use. In 1986, the town was named Innes Park after the donors.

Historically, the locality had two quarries:

- Bargara Quarry, Cockerills Road (24.8603°S 152.4718°E)
- Innes Park Quarry, 373 Back Windermere Road (24.8815°S 152.4674°E)

but, in 2014, the Planning and Environment Court determined that no further quarrying should occur after 2016.

== Demographics ==
In the 2016 census, the locality of Innes Park had a population of 2,302 people.

In the 2021 census, the locality of Innes Park had a population of 2,653 people.

== Education ==
There are no schools in Innes Park. The nearest government primary schools are Elliott Heads State School in neighbouring Elliott Heads to the south, Woongarra State School in neighbouring Woongarra to the west, and Bargara State School in Mons Repos to the north. The nearest government secondary school is Kepnock State High School in Kepnock in Bundaberg to the west. There are also a number of non-government schools in Bundaberg.

== Amenities ==
Innes Park Golf Course and Country Club is at 234 Innes Park Road (24.8702°S 152.4518°E). It has a 12-hole course, all par 3.

There is a boat ramp on the north side of Palmers Creek on the Esplanade (24.8702°S 152.4831°E). It is managed by the Bundaberg Regional Council.

Other amenities at Innes Park include a bakery and a creekside park with children's playground, skateboard park, beach volleyball court and public conveniences with changing rooms at the mouth of Palmer Creek. A sealed footpath runs from the bakery to the foreshore and along the foreshore and esplanade to Barolan Rocks and thence to the golf links at the Coral Coast resort. Barolin Rocks is a popular snorkel diving site. The Coral Cove resort and residential development is immediately south of the town and includes a golf course with club house and a small convenience store.

There are a number of parks in the area:

- Back Windermere Road Park (24.8701°S 152.4646°E)
- Gailes Park (24.8692°S 152.4775°E)
- Magnolia Court Park (24.8506°S 152.4707°E)
- Mary Kinross Park (24.8493°S 152.4763°E)
- Palmers Creek Park (24.8738°S 152.4823°E)
- Pioneer Brown Park (24.8676°S 152.4730°E)
- Turtle Cove Park (24.8526°S 152.4809°E)
- Windermere Park (24.8502°S 152.4716°E)
