= Coral Cove, Queensland =

Coral Cove Bundaberg, Queensland
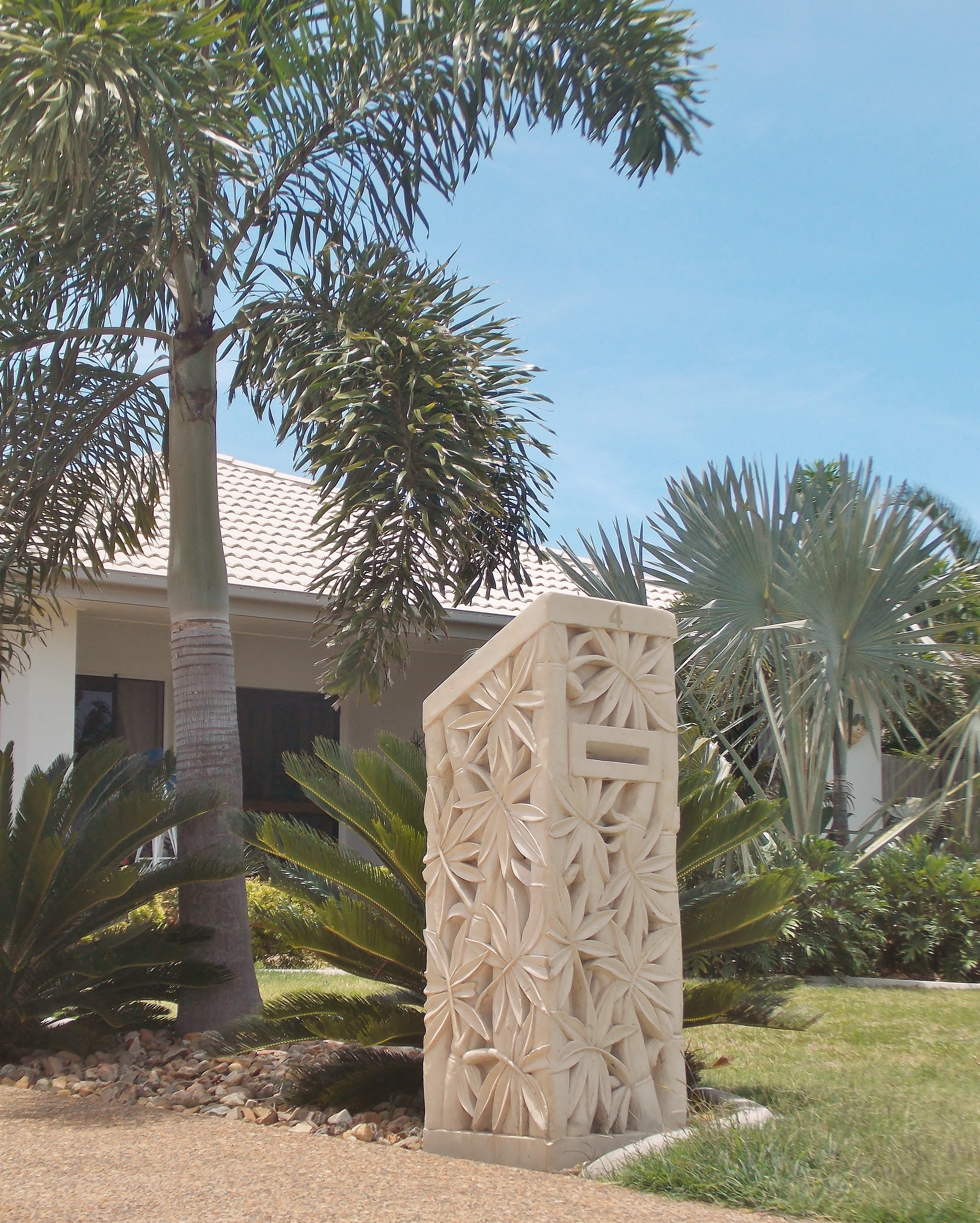
- House in Coral Cove, 2014

- Coordinates: 24.8819°S 152.4783°E
- Population: 1,462 (2021 census)
  - Density: 636/km^{2} (1,650/sq mi)
- Postcode(s): 4670
- Area: 2.3 km^{2} (0.9 sq mi)
- Time zone: AEST (UTC+10:00)
- Location: 7.8 km (5 mi) N of Elliott Heads; 9.1 km (6 mi) S of Bargara; 14.5 km (9 mi) E of Kepnock; 17.5 km (11 mi) E of Bundaberg Central; 370 km (230 mi) N of Brisbane
- LGA(s): Bundaberg Region
- State electorate(s): Burnett
- Federal division(s): Hinkler
Suburbs around Coral Cove:
Innes Park	Innes Park	Coral Sea
Elliott Heads	Coral Cove	Coral Sea
Elliott Heads	Elliott Heads	Elliott Heads

Coral Cove is a coastal locality in the Bundaberg Region, Queensland, Australia. It has been used as a diving point by tourists and contains the Coral Cove Golf course. In the 2021 census, Coral Cove had a population of 1,462 people.

== Geography ==
The locality of Coral Cove is bounded to the east by the Coral Sea and to the north-west by Palmer Creek which enters the Coral Sea at 24.871°S 152.483°E.

Barolin Rock is a rocky headland jutting into the Coral Sea (24.8826°S 152.4894°E) on the locality's east coast.

The land use is predominantly residential interspersed with sections of the Coral Cove Golf Course. The Coral Cove Environment Reserve is in the north-east of the locality near the creek mouth. The western remnant of the locality is currently undeveloped.

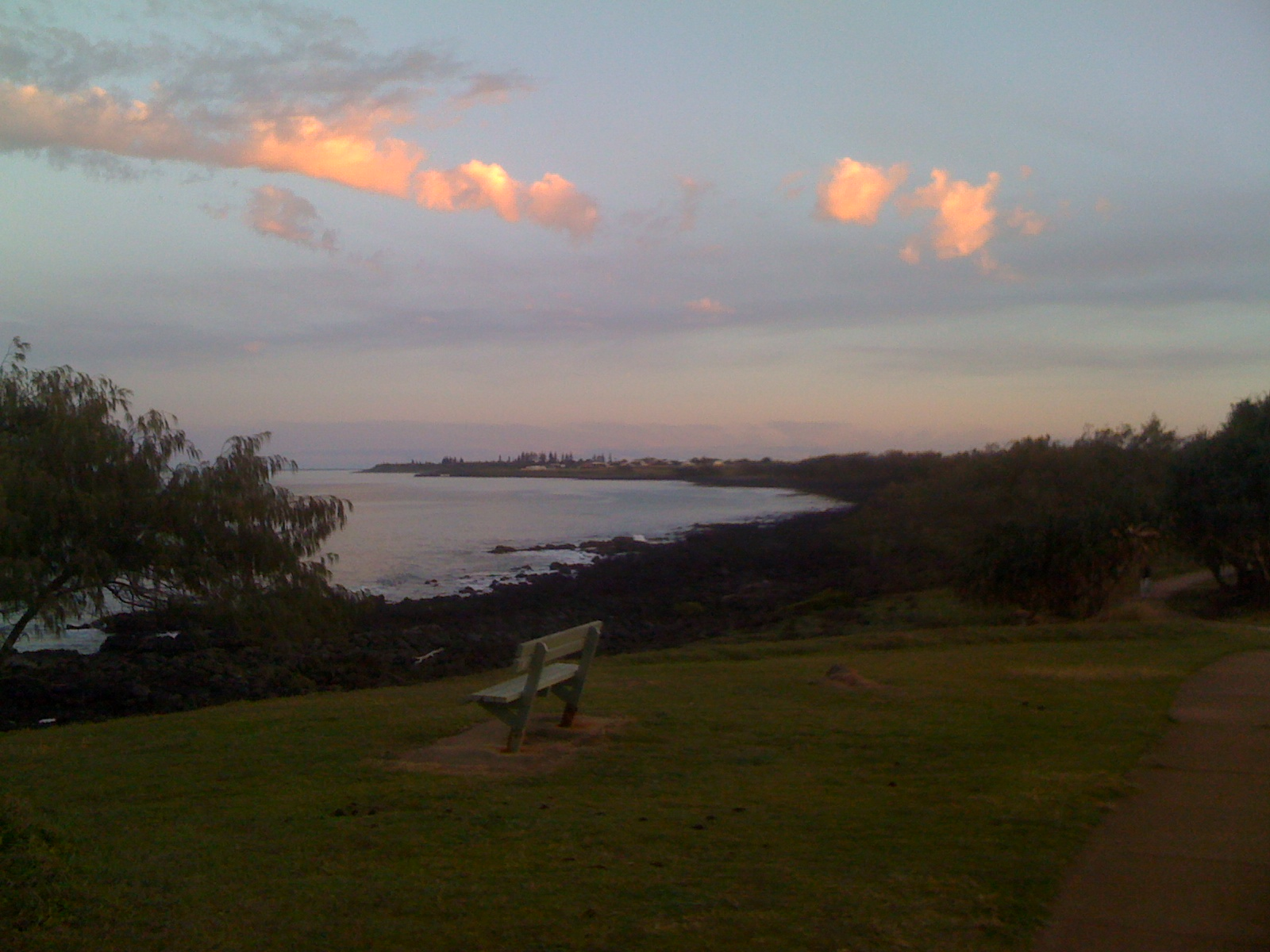
An evening near the Coral Cove diving site

The coastline of the locality is part of the Woongarra Coast section of the Great Sandy Marine Park. The Woongarra Coast has a rocky coastline which extends into the ocean with rocky outcrops that encourage the development of coral reefs. The coral reefs around Barolin Rock are some of the most significant examples of these southernmost coral reefs.

During the 2013 Cyclone Oswald, parts of the town were damaged by excessive flooding and wind damage. No casualties were reported, civilian volunteers assisted with the clean up.

== Demographics ==
In the 2011 census, Coral Cove had a population of 1,127 people.

In the 2016 census, Coral Cove had a population of 1,268 people.

In the 2021 census, Coral Cove had a population of 1,462 people.

== Education ==
There are no schools in Coral Cove. The nearest government primary school is Elliott Heads State School in neighbouring Elliott Heads to the south-west. The nearest government secondary school is Kepnock State High School in Kepnock in Bundaberg to the west.

== Attractions ==
Being so close to the shore, Barolin Rock is a popular dive site, featuring both coral formations and a wide variety of turtles, rays, reef fish and other marine fauna.

Coral Cove Golf Course is an 18-hole championship golf courses. Its longest hole is 635 metres (2,083 ft) and is the longest in Australia, and one of only two par 6 holes in Australia. The course is available to members and the public. Regular competitions are held on five days each week. The associated resort provides accommodation, bars, restaurants, conference/function rooms and swimming pools.
