= 1987 Australian federal election =

- 11 July 1987

All 148 seats in the House of Representatives 75 seats were needed for a majority in the House All 76 seats in the Senate
- Registered: 10,353,213 ▲4.90%
- Turnout: 9,715,440 (93.84%) (▼0.35 pp)
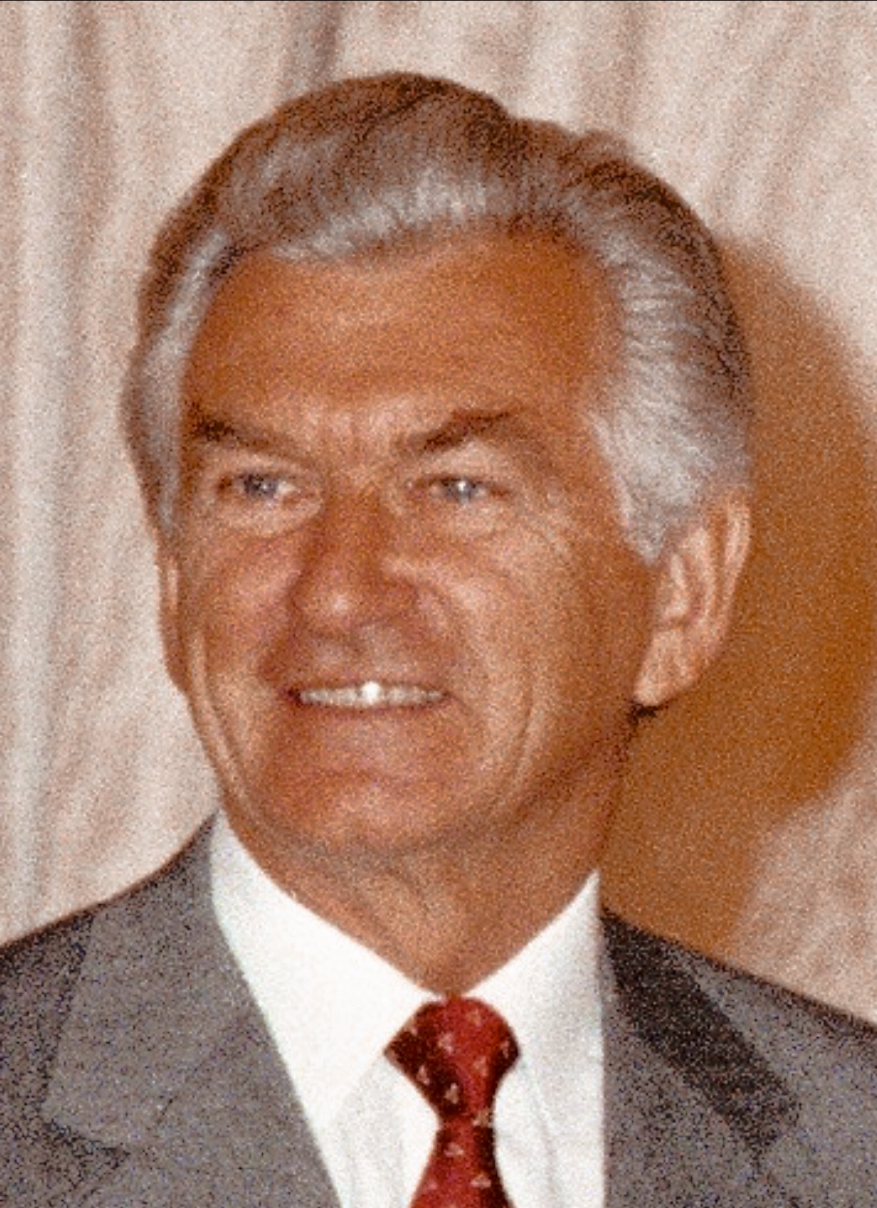

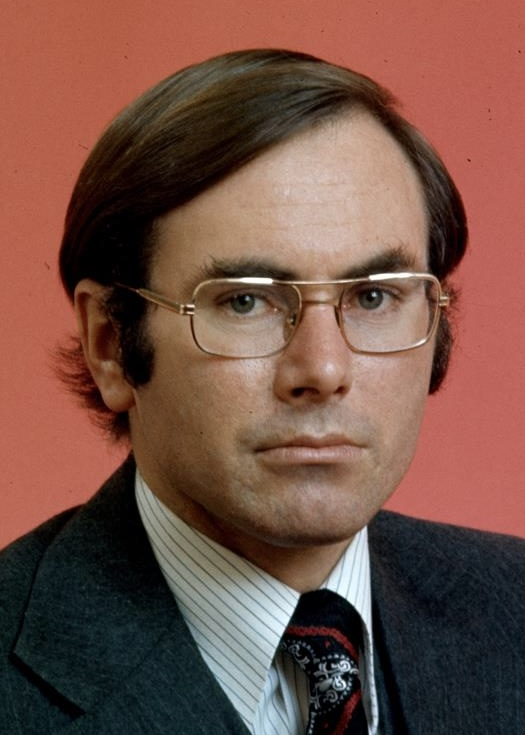

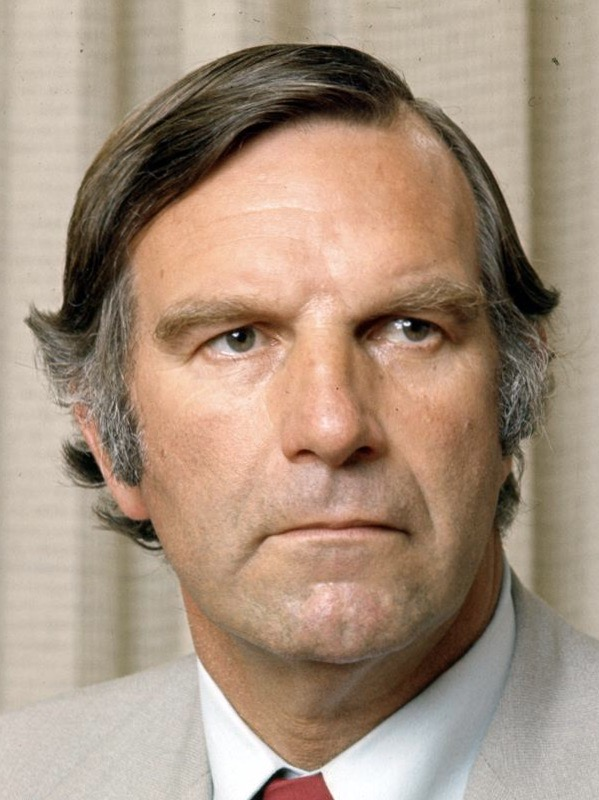
	First party	Second party	Third party
Leader	Bob Hawke	John Howard	Ian Sinclair
Party	Labor	Liberal	National
Leader since	8 February 1983	5 September 1985	17 January 1984
Leader's seat	Wills (Vic.)	Bennelong (NSW)	New England (NSW)
Last election	82 seats	45 seats (Note: Includes Country Liberal Party)	21 seats
Seats won	86 seats	43 seats	19 seats
Seat change	▲4	▼2	▼2
Primary vote	4,238,663	3,169,061	1,048,249
Percentage	45.90%	34.32%	11.35%
Swing	▼1.65%	▲0.26%	▲0.72%
TPP	50.83%	49.17%
TPP swing	▼0.94	▲0.94
- Results by division for the House of Representatives, shaded by winning party's margin of victory.
Prime Minister before election
Bob Hawke
Labor
Subsequent Prime Minister
Bob Hawke
Labor

A federal election was held in Australia on 11 July 1987, following the granting of a double dissolution on 5 June by the Governor-General Sir Ninian Stephen. Consequently, all 148 seats in the House of Representatives as well as all 76 seats in the Senate were up for election. The incumbent Australian Labor Party, led by Prime Minister Bob Hawke, defeated the opposition Liberal Party of Australia, led by John Howard and the National Party of Australia led by Ian Sinclair. This was the first, and to date only, time the Labor Party won a third consecutive election. Up until 2025 this was the largest number of seats won at a federal election by the Labor Party.

This was the last federal election before Old Parliament House was decommissioned as the seat of parliament after 61 years. In 1988, it was replaced by today's Parliament House, which sits above its predecessor on Capital Hill.

Future Opposition Leader John Hewson entered parliament at this election.

Since the introduction in the previous election in 1984 of leaders' debates, this was the only election in which there was not at least one leaders' debate due to Hawke's refusal to debate Howard.

== Background ==
The Hawke government had been in power since the general election of 1983, and had been re-elected in the snap election of 1984. Hawke, in partnership with Treasurer Paul Keating, had pursued an ambitiously reformist agenda over the course of his time in office, which included floating the Australian dollar, reducing tariffs on imports and completely reforming the tax system. However, the government's popularity dropped sharply throughout the course of its 1984–87 term, mostly due to a series of blunders such as its failed 'tax summit' (designed to gain support for Keating's proposed consumption tax), and declining terms of trade, which Treasurer Keating argued threatened to reduce Australia to the status of a banana republic unless tough measures were taken to correct the balance of trade.

Meanwhile, for much of the 1984–87 term, the opposition Liberal-National coalition led in the polls, leading to speculation that it could regain office in 1987. However, both coalition parties were also wracked by infighting throughout the parliament. In September 1985, Andrew Peacock, who had led the party to a surprisingly good result in the 1984 general election, was replaced as leader of the Liberal party by the then Deputy Leader and Shadow Treasurer John Howard, after a botched effort to remove the latter from the Deputy Leadership and replace him with Queenslander John Moore, resulting in Peacock's resignation. Nonetheless, the party remained divided, as Howard was seen by some Liberals as being too far to the right, and these opponents of the Howard policy agenda rallied to Peacock, who was eventually sacked from the shadow ministry in March 1987, following unfortunate remarks regarding Howard by Peacock to Victorian state opposition leader Jeff Kennett in an infamous car phone conversation.

Moreover, Howard and National Party leader Ian Sinclair faced challenges from the right as well as the left of the coalition, in the form of Queensland premier Sir Joh Bjelke-Petersen. Premier since 1968, Bjelke-Petersen was a hardline conservative who aggressively opposed the "socialist" Hawke Labor government, and believed that he could transfer the style of politics that had served him so well in his native Queensland to the federal stage. Following a decisive electoral victory in Queensland in 1986, the so-called Joh for Canberra campaign began in earnest, supported by much of the Queensland business establishment (the infamous "white shoe brigade"), with Bjelke-Petersen announcing that he intended to run for the Prime Ministership on 1 January 1987. At the end of February 1987, the Queensland National Party decided to withdraw its twelve federal members of parliament from the Coalition, and demanded that federal National Party leader Ian Sinclair also withdraw because of "basic differences in taxation and other philosophies and policies" between the Liberal and National parties. Within the Queensland National Party, the party president Sir Robert Sparkes enforced support for Bjelke-Petersen, making practical opposition within the Queensland ranks unlikely. The Coalition formally split in early May, with the National Party voting to break the federal coalition, and Ian Sinclair looking increasingly impotent and unable to ensure the loyalty of National Party members. However, it was at this point that Bob Sparkes reneged on his loyalty to Bjelke-Petersen and withdrew from the campaign. With his pool of supporters steadily decreasing, the likelihood of an effective challenge to the federal Coalition from Bjelke-Petersen began to collapse. When the election was called on 27 May, Bjelke-Petersen was in the United States, and quickly decided to withdraw from his bid for federal power. However, the federal coalition had been broken, and Howard's credibility as a challenger to the Hawke government had been severely damaged.

== Voting intention ==
Date	Brand	Primary vote
		ALP	L/NP	DEM	OTH
11 July 1987 election		45.90%	45.90%	6.00%	2.18%
9 July 1987	Newspoll	48.5%	43%	6.5%	2%
7 June 1987	Newspoll	53%	41%	4%	2%
3 May 1987	Newspoll	46%	48%	4%	2%
21 September 1986	Newspoll	40%	50%	9%	1%
1 December 1985	Newspoll	49%	42%	8%	1%
18 December 1984 election		47.55%	45.01%	5.45%	1.99%

== Campaign ==
The 1987 federal election was called by Prime Minister Hawke six months early, to capitalise on the aforementioned disunity in the opposition. The nominal trigger for the double dissolution was the rejection of legislation for the Australia Card by the Senate, but that did not figure prominently in the campaign, and Labor Senate Leader John Button even burst into laughter when referring to it in his speech announcing the election. Caught off guard by the early election, the opposition quickly ran into difficulties when the funding for its flagship tax cut proposals was revealed to have been miscalculated by some $540 million (at the time), a mistake revealed by the Labor party and conceded by Howard. Furthermore, although the Joh for Canberra push had been abandoned, the associated schism between the Nationals and Liberals led to several three-cornered contests, and the National Party ran independent Senate tickets in every state except New South Wales.

Labor naturally chose to campaign strongly on the disunity amongst the opposition parties, contrasting it with the relative unity of purpose of the Labor Government. However, aside from those issues, the 1987 campaign failed to generate great excitement in the electorate, and the opposition was viewed as unlikely, particularly in view of the recent infighting, to be able to remove the Labor party from power. That view was strengthened by much of the polling during the campaign, which generally showed Labor with a commanding lead. The election was the last one in which the Liberals and Nationals competed directly against each other in a federal election.

== Results ==
=== House of Representatives results ===
Post-election pendulum for the 1987 Australian federal election

Government (86) Labor (86) Opposition (62) Coalition of Liberal (43) and Nationals (19)

House of Reps (IRV) — 1987–90 – Turnout 93.84% (CV) — Informal 4.94%
Party	Votes	%	Swing	Seats	Change
Labor	4,238,663	45.90	−1.65	86	▲4
Liberal	3,169,061	34.32	+0.26	43	▼1
National	1,048,249	11.35	+0.72	19	▼2
Country Liberal	21,668	0.23	−0.09	0	▼1
Democrats	557,262	6.00	+0.55		
Others	200,183	2.18			
Total	9,235,086			148	
Two-party-preferred vote
Labor	4,693,099	50.83	−0.94	86	▲4
Liberal–National Coalition	4,540,009	49.17	+0.94	62	▼4
Invalid/blank votes	480,354	4.9	–1.9		
Turnout	9,715,440	93.8			
Registered voters	10,353,229				
Source: Federal Election Results 1949-1993

First preference vote
Labor	45.90%
Liberal	34.32%
National	11.35%
Democrats	6.00%
CLP	0.23%
Other	2.18%

Two-party-preferred vote
Labor	50.83%
Liberal/National	49.17%

Parliament seats
Labor	58.11%
Liberal	29.05%
National	12.84%

=== Senate results ===
Government (32) Labor (32) Opposition (28) Liberal (28) Crossbench (16) National (5) CLP (1) Democrats (7) NDP (1) Independent (2)

Senate (STV GV) — 1987–90 – Turnout 93.84% (CV) — Informal 3.54%
Party	Votes	%	Swing	Seats won	Seats held	Change
Labor	4,013,860	42.83	+0.66	32	32	▼2
Liberal	1,965,180	20.97	+0.38	23	27	Steady
Liberal–National joint ticket (NSW) (Note: Despite the split in the coalition, the joint ticket remained only in New South Wales)	1,289,888	13.76	+1.05	5	N/A	N/A
National (Note: The National includes the NT Nationals, consistent with the Parliamentary Library results, however the totals in Psephos: Adam Carr's Electoral Archive do not include the NT Nationals.)	664,394	7.09	+1.16	5	6	▲1
Country Liberal	19,970	0.21	−0.10	1	1	Steady
Democrats	794,107	8.47	+0.85	7	7	Steady
Nuclear Disarmament (Note: Jo Vallentine had been elected in 1984 as a Nuclear Disarmament Party member, but resigned in 1985, serving out the remainder of her term as an independent.)	102,480	1.09	−6.14	1	1	Steady
Vallentine Peace Group	40,048	0.43	+0.43	1	1	▲1
Harradine Group	37,037	0.40	+0.14	1	1	Steady
Others	444,716	4.75				
Total	9,371,681			76	76	
Invalid/blank votes	394,891	4.0	–2.8			
Turnout	9,766,571	90.5				
Registered voters	10,353,213					
Source: Federal Election Results 1949-1993

- As this was a double-dissolution election, all Senate seats were contested.
  - This was the first election in which the AEC conducted a special recount (under 1983 legislation) for the purpose of allocating three- and six-year senate terms. The recount results were not used.

== Seats changing hands ==
Seat	Pre-1987			Swing	Post-1987		
Seat	Party	Member	Margin	Swing	Margin	Member	Party
Chisholm, Vic	Labor	Helen Mayer	0.15	0.83	0.68	Michael Wooldridge	Liberal
Denison, Tas	Liberal	Michael Hodgman	0.95	4.74	3.79	Duncan Kerr	Labor
Fisher, Qld	National	Peter Slipper	2.30	2.82	0.52	Michael Lavarch	Labor
Forde, Qld	Liberal	David Watson	0.04	1.08	1.04	Mary Crawford	Labor
Hinkler, Qld	National	Bryan Conquest	0.19	1.27	1.08	Brian Courtice	Labor
Lowe, NSW	Labor	Michael Maher	2.22	3.86	1.64	Bob Woods	Liberal
Northern Territory, NT	Country Liberal	Paul Everingham	1.39	3.61	2.22	Warren Snowdon	Labor
Petrie, Qld	Liberal	John Hodges	0.63	2.07	1.44	Gary Johns	Labor

- Members listed in italics did not contest their seat at this election.

== Analysis ==
Hawke led Labor to a record third successive term in government, despite finishing slightly behind the Liberals and Nationals in the first-preference vote (the first time that a party had won an election in spite of this since 1969), and suffering a swing of some 0.9% to the Liberals and Nationals in the two-party-preferred vote. Nonetheless, Labor's result of 86 seats was the party's highest ever (the total number of seats was expanded by 23 in 1984), and the party made particularly strong gains in Bjelke-Petersen's native Queensland, gaining four seats to bring their Queensland tally to 13 of 24 seats. The Liberals suffered a net loss of two seats, primarily due to losses in Queensland, although they did make small gains in Howard's native New South Wales and in Victoria. The federal National Party also suffered a net loss of two seats, failing to expand upon its traditional rural base and hampered by disunity within its ranks.

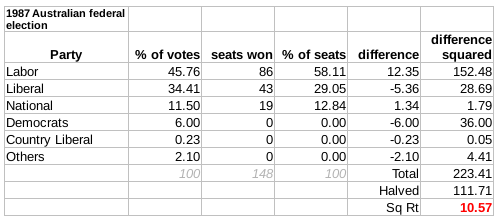
The Gallagher Index result: 10.57

This was the most recent election in which every seat in the House of Representatives was won by either Labor or the Coalition. Following the election, John Howard stayed on as leader of the Liberal Party, and would eventually become Prime Minister in 1996. However, the experience of the 1987 campaign is said to have been the origin of his oft-repeated remark that, in politics, "disunity is death". Meanwhile, Hawke would go on to win a fourth-consecutive election for the Labor party, but was eventually replaced as Labor leader and Prime Minister by Paul Keating in 1991.

As of 2024, the 1987 election was the last time the National party received over 10% of the vote for the House of Representatives.

== See also ==
- Candidates of the Australian federal election, 1987
- Members of the Australian House of Representatives, 1987-1990
- Members of the Australian Senate, 1987-1990

== Bibliography ==
- Adams, David (1987). "Political Review". Australian Quarterly. 59 (2): 245–255. doi:10.2307/20635436. JSTOR 20635436.
- Davey, Paul (2010). Ninety Not Out: The Nationals 1920–2010. Sydney: University of NSW Press.
- Rydon, Joan (1987). "The Federal Elections of 1987 and their Absurdities". The Australian Quarterly. 59 (3/4): 357–365. doi:10.2307/20635449. JSTOR 20635449.
- Walter, James (1990). "Johannes Bjelke-Petersen". In Dennis Murphy, Roger Joyce & Margaret Cribb (ed.). Premiers of Queensland. Brisbane: University of Queensland Press. pp. 495–529.
