= Elliott Heads, Queensland =

Elliott Heads
- Town
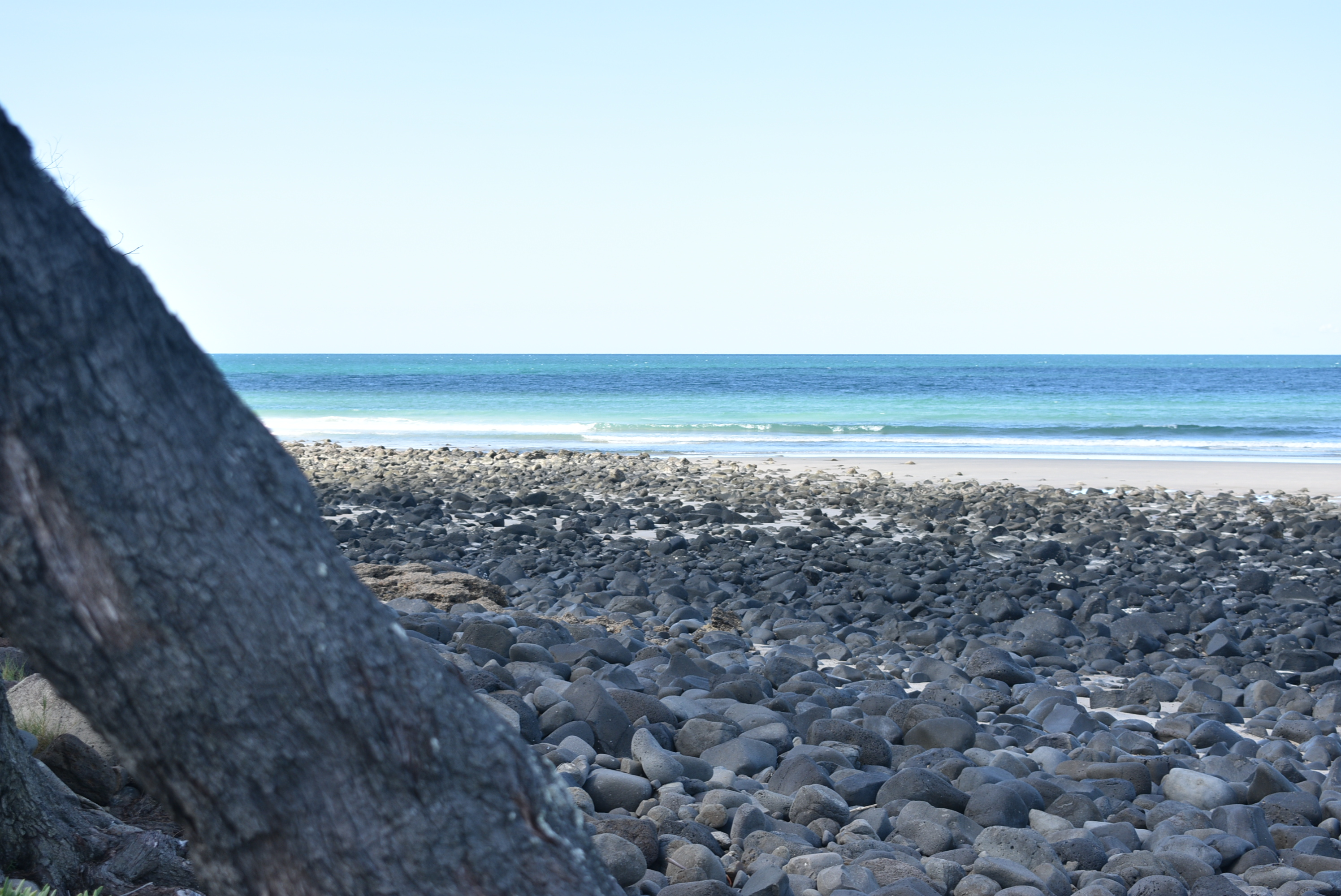
- The Northern side of where the old river mouth was

- Interactive map of Elliott Heads
- Coordinates: 24.9119°S 152.4902°E
- Country: Australia
- State: Queensland
- LGA: Bundaberg Region
- Location: 14.6 km (9.1 mi) SE of Kepnock; 18.0 km (11.2 mi) SE of Bundaberg CBD; 364 km (226 mi) N of Brisbane

Government
  - State electorate: Burnett
  - Federal division: Hinkler

Area
  - Total: 12.5 km^{2} (4.8 sq mi)

Population
  - Total: 1,160 (2021 census)
  - Density: 92.8/km^{2} (240.4/sq mi)
- Time zone: UTC+10:00 (AEST)
- Postcode: 4670
Localities around Elliott Heads
Woongarra	Innes Park	Coral Cove
Calavos	Elliott Heads	Coral Sea
Calavos	Coonarr	Coral Sea

Elliott Heads is a coastal town and locality in the Bundaberg Region, Queensland, Australia. In the 2021 census, the locality of Elliott Heads had a population of 1,160 people.

== Geography ==
The town is located at the mouth of the Elliott River, 359 kilometres (223 mi) north of the state capital, Brisbane.

Elliott Heads is surrounded by small crop and sugarcane farms.

== History ==
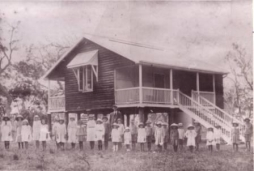
Airy Park State School, 1917

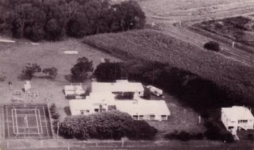
Aerial view of Elliott Heads State School, 1973

The district was officially known as Springfield until it was renamed Elliott Heads on 1 November 1967 by the Queensland Place Names Board. The name refers to the area being at the mouth of the Elliott River where it flows into the Coral Sea. The river in turn takes its name from Gilbert Eliott (1796-1871) (note spelling) public servant, pastoralist and politician, Speaker of Queensland Legislative Assembly 1860–70, Member for Wide Bay 1860–70.

Elliott Heads Post Office opened by January 1952 and closed in 1986.

Airy Park State School (sometimes spelled Airey Park) opened on 16 January 1913. The land for the school was donated by Mr Breusch who had named his first property Airy Park after Peter Airey, a Labor politician. In 1966, the school was enlarged by the relocation of the former Electra State School building. The name of the school was changed to Elliott Heads State School on 23 March 1967.

== Demographics ==
In the 2016 census, the locality of Elliott Heads had a population of 1,040 people.

In the 2021 census, the locality of Elliott Heads had a population of 1,160 people.

== Education ==
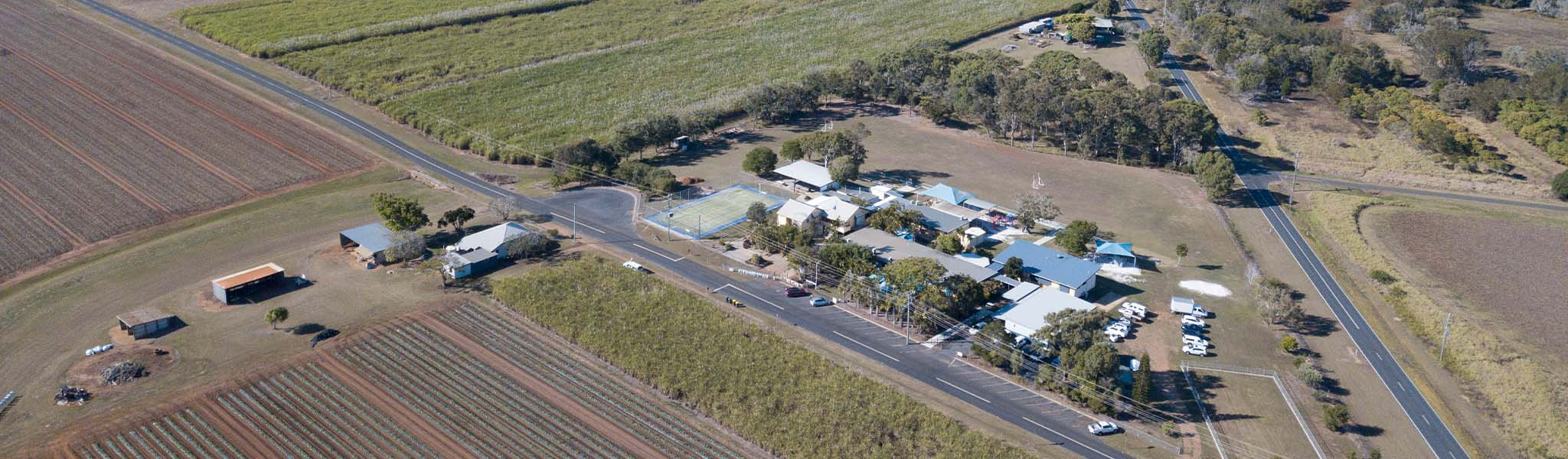
Aerial view of Elliott Heads State School, 2022

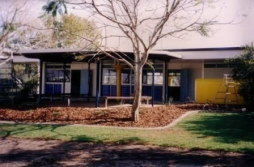
B Block, Elliott Heads State School, 1994

Elliott Heads State School is a government primary (Prep-6) school for boys and girls at 143 Breusch Road (24.9072°S 152.4756°E). In 2017, the school had an enrolment of 103 students with 8 teachers (7 full-time equivalent) and 10 non-teaching staff (5 full-time equivalent). In 2022, the school had an enrolment of 122 students with 8 teachers (7 full-time equivalent) and 10 non-teaching staff (5 full-time equivalent).

There are no secondary schools in Elliott Heads; the nearest government secondary school is Kepnock State High School in Kepnock, which is 16.3 kilometres (10.1 mi) away.

== Amenities ==
Elliott Heads is a popular recreation area, offering both surf and still water areas for swimming, fishing, sailboarding, jet skiing, stand-up paddleboarding and other water activities. There is a popular caravan park next to the surf beach with amenities. The local Surf Life Saving Club is located near the surf beach.
