= Alloway, Queensland =

Alloway
- Suburb
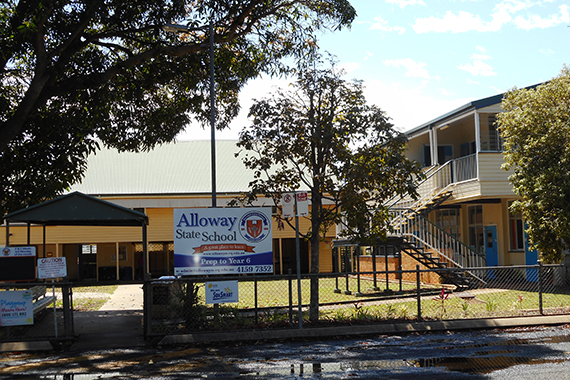
- Alloway State School, 2019

- Interactive map of Alloway
- Coordinates: 24.9533°S 152.3636°E
- Country: Australia
- State: Queensland
- LGA: Bundaberg Region
- Location: 9.9 km (6.2 mi) S of Bundaberg CBD; 363 km (226 mi) N of Brisbane

Government
  - State electorate: Burnett
  - Federal division: Hinkler

Area
  - Total: 72.8 km^{2} (28.1 sq mi)
- Elevation: 10–30 m (33–98 ft)

Population
  - Total: 488 (2021 census)
  - Density: 6.703/km^{2} (17.361/sq mi)
- Time zone: UTC+10:00 (AEST)
- Postcode: 4670
Suburbs around Alloway
Kensington	Thabeban	Woongarra
Elliott	Alloway	Calavos
Elliott	Elliott	Kinkuna

Alloway is a rural locality in the Bundaberg Region, Queensland, Australia. In the 2021 census, Alloway had a population of 488 people.

Clayton is a neighbourhood (24.9333°S 152.3666°E) in the north of the locality.

== Geography ==
The Elliott River comprises the southern boundary of the locality.

The North Coast railway line enters the locality from the south (Elliott / Kinkuna) and exits to north (Thabeban) with the locality served by the following railway stations (from north to south):

- Clayton railway station, now abandoned (24.9254°S 152.3640°E)
- Alloway railway station, now abandoned (24.9465°S 152.3683°E)
- Elliott railway station (24.9791°S 152.3750°E)

Alloway is flat land between 10 and 30 metres (33 and 98 ft) above sea level. The land use is crop growing, predominantly the growing of sugarcane.

== History ==
The name Alloway is taking from the railway siding, which was in turned named after Alloway, Ayrshire, Scotland (the birthplace of Robert Burns) on 8 July 1939 by the Queensland Railways Department.

Elliott State School opened on 4 February 1886 and it is believed there was a "school at Bingera and Baranyan Homestead near Bundaberg" on the site prior to this. In 1960, it was renamed Alloway State School.

Clayton State School opened on 31 July 1930 on a 5-acre (2.0 ha) site donated by Mrs Ernestina Julia Sarah Natzke. It closed in 1947 but reopened in 1952. It closed permanently on 31 December 1971. On 16 January 1989 the Queensland Government decided to return the land to Mrs Ernestina Crank, the daughter and sole beneficiary of Mrs Natzke who had died in August 1988. The school was at 430 Clayton Road (24.9237°S 152.3553°E).

== Demographics ==
In the 2016 census, Alloway had a population of 490 people.

In the 2021 census, Alloway had a population of 488 people.

== Education ==
Alloway State School is a government primary (Prep-6) school for boys and girls at 4334 Goodwood Road (24.9521°S 152.3782°E). In 2016, the school had an enrolment of 51 students with 6 teachers (3 equivalent full-time) and 5 non-teaching staff (3 equivalent full-time). In 2018, the school had an enrolment of 50 students with 3 teachers (2 full-time equivalent) and 6 non-teaching staff (3 full-time equivalent).

There are no secondary schools in Alloway. The nearest government secondary school is Bundaberg State High School in Bundaberg to the north.
