= Post-election pendulum for the 1987 Australian federal election =

The Mackerras pendulum as a way of predicting the outcome of an election contested between two major parties in a Westminster style lower house legislature such as the Australian House of Representatives, which is composed of single-member electorates and which uses a preferential voting system such as a Condorcet method or instant-runoff voting.

The pendulum works by lining up all of the seats held in Parliament for the government, the opposition and the crossbenches according to the percentage point margin they are held by on a two party preferred basis. This is also known as the swing required for the seat to change hands. Given a uniform swing to the opposition or government parties, the number of seats that change hands can be predicted.

Government seats (86)
Marginal
Fisher	Qld	Michael Lavarch	ALP	0.5
Barton	NSW	Gary Punch	ALP	1.0
Forde	Qld	Mary Crawford	ALP	1.0
Hinkler	Qld	Brian Courtice	ALP	1.1
Hawker	SA	Elizabeth Harvey	ALP	1.2
Petrie	Qld	Gary Johns	ALP	1.4
Dunkley	Vic	Bob Chynoweth	ALP	1.7
Ballarat	Vic	John Mildren	ALP	1.9
Northern Territory	NT	Warren Snowdon	ALP	2.2
Isaacs	Vic	David Charles	ALP	2.7
Streeton	Vic	Tony Lamb	ALP	2.9
Cowan	WA	Carolyn Jakobsen	ALP	3.2
Calare	NSW	David Simmons	ALP	3.3
Makin	SA	Peter Duncan	ALP	3.4
Bendigo	Vic	John Brumby	ALP	3.5
Hunter	NSW	Eric Fitzgibbon	ALP	3.6
Aston	Vic	John Saunderson	ALP	3.6
Stirling	WA	Ron Edwards	ALP	3.6
St George	NSW	Stephen Dubois	ALP	3.7
Canning	WA	George Gear	ALP	3.8
Denison	Tas	Duncan Kerr	ALP	3.8
Phillip	NSW	Jeannette McHugh	ALP	4.1
McEwen	Vic	Peter Cleeland	ALP	4.1
McMillan	Vic	Barry Cunningham	ALP	4.3
Leichhardt	Qld	John Gayler	ALP	4.3
Eden-Monaro	NSW	Jim Snow	ALP	4.4
Burke	Vic	Neil O'Keefe	ALP	4.4
Robertson	NSW	Barry Cohen	ALP	4.6
Rankin	Qld	David Beddall	ALP	4.7
Henty	Vic	Joan Child	ALP	4.8
Kingston	SA	Gordon Bilney	ALP	4.8
Bowman	Qld	Con Sciacca	ALP	5.0
Hughes	NSW	Robert Tickner	ALP	5.1
Hindmarsh	SA	John Scott	ALP	5.1
Moore	WA	Allen Blanchard	ALP	5.2
Newcastle	NSW	Allan Morris	ALP	5.3 v IND
Grey	SA	Lloyd O'Neil	ALP	5.8
Fairly safe
Parramatta	NSW	John Brown	ALP	6.3
Brisbane	Qld	Manfred Cross	ALP	6.4
Hotham	Vic	Lewis Kent	ALP	6.5
Adelaide	SA	Chris Hurford	ALP	6.5
Brand	WA	Wendy Fatin	ALP	6.7
Kalgoorlie	WA	Graeme Campbell	ALP	6.7
Banks	NSW	John Mountford	ALP	6.8
Herbert	Qld	Ted Lindsay	ALP	6.8
Perth	WA	Ric Charlesworth	ALP	6.8
Dobell	NSW	Michael Lee	ALP	6.9
Capricornia	Qld	Keith Wright	ALP	7.0
Throsby	NSW	Colin Hollis	ALP	7.1
Maribyrnong	Vic	Alan Griffiths	ALP	7.2
La Trobe	Vic	Peter Milton	ALP	7.3
Swan	WA	Kim Beazley	ALP	8.0
Jagajaga	Vic	Peter Staples	ALP	8.2
Lilley	Qld	Elaine Darling	ALP	8.2
Blaxland	NSW	Paul Keating	ALP	8.8
Macarthur	NSW	Stephen Martin	ALP	8.9
Lindsay	NSW	Ross Free	ALP	9.0
Grayndler	NSW	Leo McLeay	ALP	9.7
Greenway	NSW	Russ Gorman	ALP	9.9
Melbourne Ports	Vic	Clyde Holding	ALP	9.9
Safe
Holt	Vic	Michael Duffy	ALP	10.4
Griffith	Qld	Ben Humphreys	ALP	10.4
Shortland	NSW	Peter Morris	ALP	11.1
Reid	NSW	Tom Uren	ALP	11.8
Canberra	ACT	Ros Kelly	ALP	12.0
Fowler	NSW	Ted Grace	ALP	12.4
Fremantle	WA	John Dawkins	ALP	12.7
Corio	Vic	Gordon Scholes	ALP	12.9
Werriwa	NSW	John Kerin	ALP	13.7
Prospect	NSW	Dick Klugman	ALP	13.9
Kingsford Smith	NSW	Lionel Bowen	ALP	14.2
Cunningham	NSW	Stewart West	ALP	14.4
Fraser	ACT	John Langmore	ALP	14.5
Oxley	Qld	Bill Hayden	ALP	14.9
Port Adelaide	SA	Mick Young	ALP	16.3
Charlton	NSW	Bob Brown	ALP	16.9
Bonython	SA	Neal Blewitt	ALP	18.1
Calwell	Vic	Andrew Theophanous	ALP	18.6
Chifley	NSW	Roger Price	ALP	19.1
Melbourne	Vic	Gerry Hand	ALP	19.4
Lalor	Vic	Barry Jones	ALP	19.5
Sydney	NSW	Peter Baldwin	ALP	19.9
Wills	Vic	Bob Hawke	ALP	19.9
Very safe
Gellibrand	Vic	Ralph Willis	ALP	20.6
Batman	Vic	Brian Howe	ALP	22.8
Scullin	Vic	Harry Jenkins	ALP	23.2

Liberal seats (43)
Marginal
Chisholm	Vic	Michael Wooldridge	LIB	0.7
Moreton	Qld	Don Cameron	LIB	0.7
Casey	Vic	Bob Halverson	LIB	1.2
Flinders	Vic	Peter Reith	LIB	1.3
Deakin	Vic	Julian Beale	LIB	1.5
Lowe	NSW	Bob Woods	LIB	1.6
Bruce	Vic	Ken Aldred	LIB	2.0
Forrest	WA	Geoff Prosser	LIB	3.1
Franklin	Tas	Bruce Goodluck	LIB	3.3
Bass	Tas	Warwick Smith	LIB	3.7
Fadden	Qld	David Jull	LIB	4.4
Lyons	Tas	Max Burr	LIB	4.4
Corangamite	Vic	Stewart McArthur	LIB	4.6
Macquarie	NSW	Alasdair Webster	LIB	5.8
Fairly safe
Cook	NSW	Don Dobie	LIB	6.1
Sturt	SA	Ian Wilson	LIB	6.6
Menzies	Vic	Neil Brown	LIB	7.3
Tangney	WA	Peter Shack	LIB	7.4
Hume	NSW	Wal Fife	LIB	7.5
Braddon	Tas	Chris Miles	LIB	7.9
Wentworth	NSW	John Hewson	LIB	8.0
Ryan	Qld	John Moore	LIB	8.9
Goldstein	Vic	Ian Macphee	LIB	9.5
Safe
Moncrieff	Qld	Kathy Sullivan	LIB	10.2
Bennelong	NSW	John Howard	LIB	10.6
Dundas	NSW	Phillip Ruddock	LIB	11.0
Curtin	WA	Allan Rocher	LIB	11.6
Barker	SA	James Porter	LIB	11.6
Boothby	SA	Steele Hall	LIB	11.6
Higgins	Vic	Roger Shipton	LIB	12.6
Indi	Vic	Ewen Cameron	LIB	12.6
McPherson	Qld	Peter White	LIB	12.6
Mayo	SA	Alexander Downer	LIB	12.6
Wannon	Vic	David Hawker	LIB	13.1
Mackellar	NSW	Jim Carlton	LIB	13.2
Wakefield	SA	Neil Andrew	LIB	13.7
Kooyong	Vic	Andrew Peacock	LIB	14.0
Warringah	NSW	Michael MacKellar	LIB	14.1
North Sydney	NSW	John Spender	LIB	14.2
Berowra	NSW	Harry Edwards	LIB	16.7
Very safe
O'Connor	WA	Wilson Tuckey	LIB	20.6
Mitchell	NSW	Alan Cadman	LIB	22.5
Bradfield	NSW	David Connolly	LIB	26.1
National seats (19)
Dawson	Qld	Ray Braithwaite	NAT	1.9
Kennedy	Qld	Bob Katter Sr.	NAT	3.0
Riverina-Darling	NSW	Noel Hicks	NAT	3.5
Page	NSW	Ian Robinson	NAT	4.5
Gilmore	NSW	John Sharp	NAT	6.2
Richmond	NSW	Charles Blunt	NAT	6.6
Fairfax	Qld	Evan Adermann	NAT	7.3
New England	NSW	Ian Sinclair	NAT	8.4
Wide Bay	Qld	Clarrie Millar	NAT	8.8
Cowper	NSW	Garry Nehl	NAT	9.1
Lyne	NSW	Bruce Cowan	NAT	9.8
Gwydir	NSW	Ralph Hunt	NAT	10.3
Parkes	NSW	Michael Cobb	NAT	10.8
Groom	Qld	Tom McVeigh	NAT	12.8
Maranoa	Qld	Ian Cameron	NAT	14.9
Gippsland	Vic	Peter McGauran	NAT	15.0
Farrer	NSW	Tim Fischer	NAT	15.2
Mallee	Vic	Peter Fisher	NAT	20.1
Murray	Vic	Bruce Lloyd	NAT	20.4
