= Paul Neville (politician) =

Australian politician (1940–2019)

Paul Neville OAM
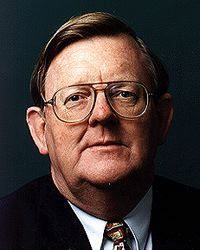

Member of the Australian Parliament for Hinkler
- In office 13 March 1993 – 5 August 2013
- Preceded by: Brian Courtice
- Succeeded by: Keith Pitt

Personal details
- Born: 28 March 1940 Warwick, Queensland
- Died: 1 January 2019 (aged 78) Bundaberg, Queensland
- Party: National (federal); Liberal National (state, 2010-2019)
- Spouse: Margaret Neville
- Occupation: Theatre supervisor

Paul Christopher Neville (28 March 1940 – 1 January 2019) was an Australian politician who was a National Party member of the Australian House of Representatives from March 1993 to August 2013, representing the Division of Hinkler, Queensland. After the Queensland chapters of the Nationals and Liberals merged in 2008 as the Liberal National Party of Queensland, Neville continued to sit with the Nationals in Parliament.

== Biography ==
Neville was born in Warwick, Queensland, and was a theatre supervisor, Queensland State Secretary, Arts Council of Australia and manager of the Bundaberg District Tourism and Development Board before entering politics. He was National Party Whip from 1998 until his retirement in 2013.

Credit for preserving the Parliament House centenary flag has been given to Neville who on 18 September 2001 during the Centenary of Federation requested of the Speaker that "before it [the flag] becomes too faded or too tattered, [it] be taken down and perhaps offered to a museum or an art gallery as the seminal flag that flew over this building 100 years from the time the first flag was flown?" It has subsequently been paraded at schools to mark Australian National Flag Day on a tour of the Australian Capital Territory, New South Wales and Queensland.

In 2009 Neville represented Australia in the General Assembly of the United Nations for several months.

Neville, a long-time resident of Limpus Crescent, Kalkie died at the Bundaberg Base Hospital, aged 78 in the early hours of 1 January 2019 after suffering health problems for some time. He and his wife Margaret were the parents of five children.

It was announced on Australia Day 2019 Neville had been posthumously awarded a Medal of the Order of Australia (OAM) in recognition of his dedication to the Bundaberg community. It is unclear who nominated Neville for the prestigious award; however, to meet prerequisites it is indicated that he must have been nominated prior to his death on 1 January 2019.

Parliament of Australia
Preceded by Brian Courtice	Member for Hinkler; 1993–2013	Succeeded by Keith Pitt
