= Keith Pitt =

Australian politician (born 1969)

His Excellency The Honourable Keith Pitt
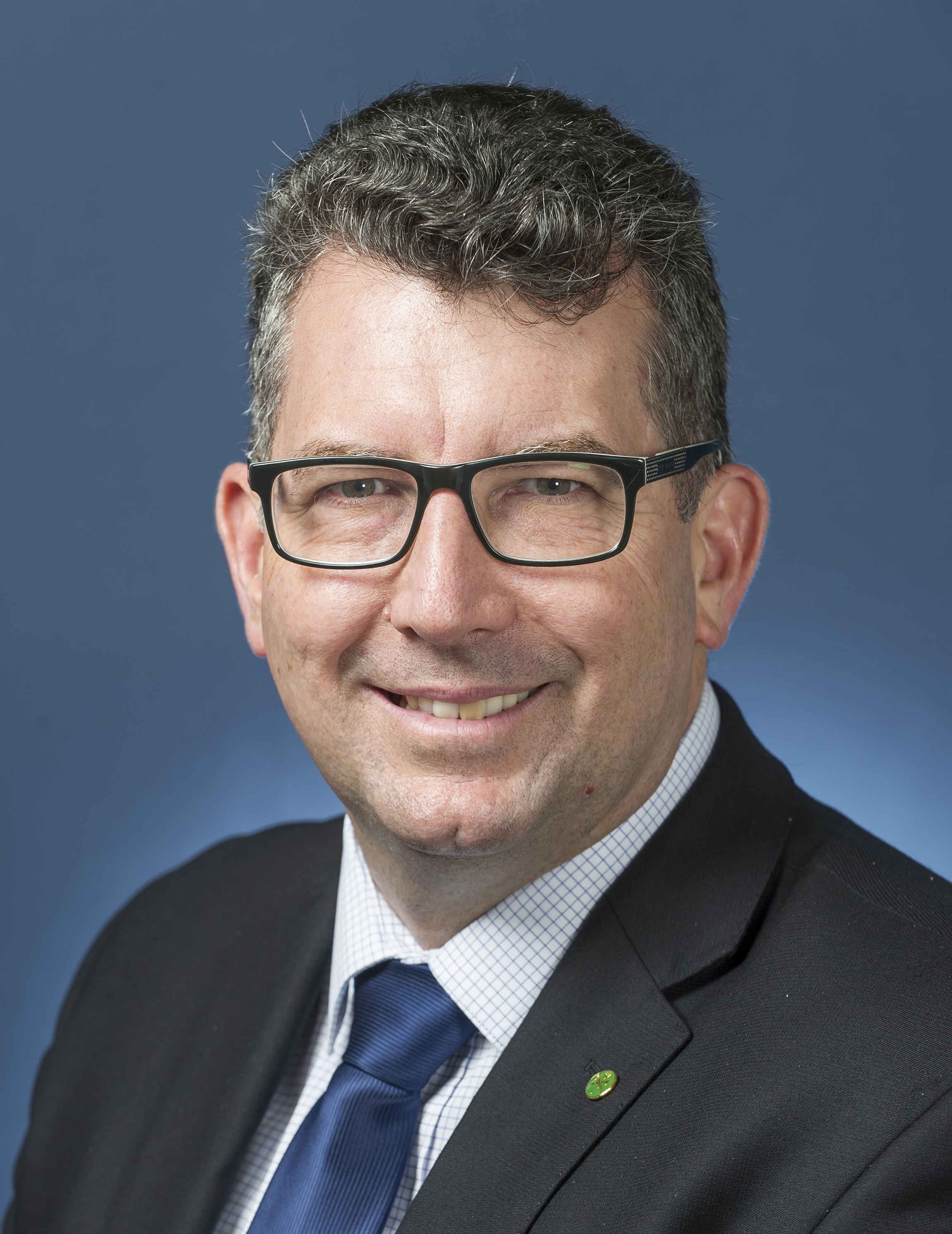

Ambassador of Australia to the Holy See
- Incumbent
- Assumed office 3 June 2025
- Preceded by: Chiara Porro

Minister for Resources and Water (Note: Minister for Resources, Water and Northern Australia until 2 July 2021.)
- In office 6 February 2020 – 23 May 2022
- Prime Minister: Scott Morrison
- Preceded by: Matt Canavan
- Succeeded by: Madeleine King (Resources) Tanya Plibersek (Water)

Assistant Minister to the Deputy Prime Minister
- In office 5 March 2018 – 28 August 2018
- Prime Minister: Malcolm Turnbull; Scott Morrison
- Preceded by: Luke Hartsuyker
- Succeeded by: Andrew Gee
- In office 18 February 2016 – 19 July 2016
- Preceded by: Michael McCormack
- Succeeded by: Luke Hartsuyker

Assistant Minister for Trade, Investment and Tourism
- In office 19 July 2016 – 20 December 2017
- Prime Minister: Malcolm Turnbull
- Preceded by: Richard Colbeck (as Minister Assisting the Minister for Trade and Investment)
- Succeeded by: Luke Hartsuyker

Member of the Australian Parliament for Hinkler
- In office 7 September 2013 – 19 January 2025
- Preceded by: Paul Neville
- Succeeded by: David Batt

Personal details
- Born: Keith John Pitt; 31 August 1969 (age 57) Bundaberg, Queensland, Australia
- Party: National
- Other political affiliations: Liberal National Party of Queensland
- Spouse: Allison
- Children: 3
- Education: Queensland University of Technology
- Occupation: Electrical engineer, businessman, farmer

Keith John Pitt (born 31 August 1969) is an Australian diplomat and former politician. He is a member of the National Party and represented the Division of Hinkler in Queensland between the 2013 federal election and January 2025. He was a member of cabinet in the Morrison government as Minister for Resources and Water and also served as an assistant minister in the Turnbull government. He was an electrical engineer and businessman before entering politics. On 16 February 2025 Pitt was appointed Australian Ambassador to the Holy See. He presented his credential letters to Pope Leo XIV on 3 June 2025.

== Early life ==
Pitt was born in Bundaberg, Queensland. He grew up in Woongarra and attended Kepnock State High School before taking up an electrical apprenticeship. He went on to the Queensland University of Technology, graduating with the degree of Bachelor of Engineering.

Pitt worked as an electrical fitter mechanic before joining Bundaberg Sugar as an electrical engineer. He later served as the company's group safety co-ordinator. In 2002, he established the Australian Safety and Training Alliance, a workplace health and safety training provider. He and his wife also purchased two sugarcane farms, one bought in 1998 and one in 2004, but they were sold to concentrate on the training business.

== Parliamentary career ==
In December 2012, Pitt won the Liberal National Party of Queensland's preselection ballot for the Division of Hinkler, following the retirement of incumbent MP Paul Neville. He had been a member of the LNP for only six months prior to his selection, and stated that his victory in the ballot was a surprise. He retained Hinkler for the party at the 2013 federal election and like Neville sits with the Nationals in federal parliament. He was re-elected at the 2016 and 2019 federal elections.

Pitt served as the Assistant Minister to the Deputy Prime Minister between February and July 2016, following a rearrangement in the First Turnbull Ministry. With the reelection of the Turnbull government in 2016, Pitt served as the Assistant Minister for Trade, Investment and Tourism between July 2016 and December 2017 in the Second Turnbull Ministry. He returned as Assistant Minister to the Deputy Prime Minister from 5 March to 28 August 2018.

In February 2020, following the resignation of Matt Canavan, Pitt was reappointed to the ministry as Minister for Resources, Water and Northern Australia in the Second Morrison Ministry. He reportedly supported Michael McCormack against Barnaby Joyce in the preceding Nationals leadership spill. He contested the party's vacant deputy leadership against David Littleproud and David Gillespie, with Littleproud emerging victorious.

In December 2024, Pitt announced he would be quitting parliament, criticising party leader David Littleproud for being "too obedient" to the Liberal Party. He resigned on 19 January 2025.

=== Political views ===
In December 2017, Pitt was one of only four members of the House of Representatives to vote against the Marriage Amendment (Definition and Religious Freedoms) Bill 2017, which legalised same-sex marriage in Australia.

Described as "one of the government's most outspoken advocates for nuclear power", Pitt quit as assistant minister in August 2018 to demonstrate his opposition to the government commitment to the Paris Agreement on emission reductions. He has been described as "one of the key drivers" behind a 2019 parliamentary inquiry into nuclear power which "recommended the government consider adding the energy technology to its future energy mix".

Pitt is a monarchist.

== Australian Ambassador to the Holy See ==
Pitt was appointed Ambassador to the Holy See on the 16 February 2025. Archbishop Timothy Costelloe President of the Australian Catholic Bishops Conference "welcomed" the appointment. The start of his term was delayed by the illness and death of Pope Francis. He presented his credential letters to Pope Leo XIV on 3 June 2025.

== Personal life ==
Pitt has three children with his wife Allison.

== Notes ==
Parliament of Australia
Preceded by Paul Neville	Member for Hinkler; 2013–2025	Vacant
Political offices
Preceded by Richard Colbeck as Minister Assisting the Minister for Trade and Investment	Assistant Minister for Trade, Investment and Tourism; 2016–2017	Succeeded by Luke Hartsuyker
Preceded by Michael McCormack	Assistant Minister to the Deputy Prime Minister; 2016	Succeeded by Luke Hartsuyker
Preceded by Luke Hartsuyker	Assistant Minister to the Deputy Prime Minister; 2018	Succeeded by Andrew Gee
Preceded by Matt Canavan as Minister for Resources and Northern Australia	Minister for Resources, Water and Northern Australia; 2020–2022	Succeeded by Madeleine King as Minister for Resources; Minister for Northern Australia
Preceded by David Littleproud as Minister for Water Resources, Drought, Rural Finance, Natural Disaster and Emergency Management	Minister for Resources, Water and Northern Australia; 2020–2022	Succeeded by Tanya Plibersek as Minister for the Environment and Water
