= Bryan Conquest =

Australian politician (1930–2018)

Member of the Australian Parliament for Hinkler
- In office 1 December 1984 – 11 July 1987
- Preceded by: New seat
- Succeeded by: Brian Courtice

Personal details
- Born: 20 July 1930 Quilpie, Queensland, Australia
- Died: 2 January 2018 (aged 87) Bundaberg, Queensland, Australia
- Party: National
- Occupation: Printer

Bryan Joseph Conquest (20 July 1930 – 2 January 2018) was an Australian politician. He was a member of the House of Representatives from 1984 to 1987, representing the Queensland seat of Hinkler for the National Party. He served on the Bundaberg City Council from 1970 to 1985 and ran a printing business before entering politics.

== Early life ==
Conquest was born on 20 July 1930 in Quilpie, Queensland. He was one of three children born to Marjory Ellen and Norman Charles Conquest; his mother was a seamstress and his father was a drayman.

Conquest spent his early years in Brisbane, before his family moved north to Gladstone during World War II. He left school in 1945 and became a printing apprentice at The Observer, working as a compositor and letterpress machinist. He also served in the Citizen Military Forces from 1951 to 1954. Conquest played semi-professional rugby league in the Gladstone District Rugby League and Bundaberg Rugby League, moving to Bundaberg in 1954 to play for Past Brothers and working at Glovers Printing Works. He later took over the printing business in partnership with Graham Evans.

== Politics ==
Conquest served on the Bundaberg City Council from 1970 to 1985 and was a director of the Bundaberg Harbour Board and a local housing co-operative. He was an officeholder in the local National Party organisation.

At the 1984 federal election, Conquest was elected as the inaugural MP for the newly created marginal seat of Hinkler, taking in Bundaberg and other areas of central Queensland. He narrowly defeated the Australian Labor Party candidate Brian Courtice, who in turn won a narrow victory at the 1987 election.

Conquest briefly served as the National Party's spokesman on women and youth affairs in 1987, following the National Party's decision to create a separate frontbench during the Coalition split caused by the "Joh for Canberra" campaign.

== Personal life ==
Conquest had three children with his wife Beverly. He was diagnosed with Parkinson's disease in old age and died on 2 January 2018, aged 87.

Parliament of Australia
New seat	Member for Hinkler; 1984–1987	Succeeded by Brian Courtice
