= Great Sandy Marine Park =

Marine park in Australia

Great Sandy Marine Park is a protected marine area located off the coast of Queensland, Australia. The park surrounds the island of K'Gari (formerly known as Fraser Island) and the Great Sandy National Park on it. It is located between the southern edge of the Great Barrier Reef Marine Park and the northern part of the Sunshine Coast, covering an area of around 1,500 km^{2} (579.153 mi^{2}). The area is renowned for its diverse marine ecosystems, ranging from coral reefs and seagrass meadows to estuaries and mangrove forests.

== Marine Life and Biodiversity ==
The marine park's waters support a wide variety of flora and fauna. The diverse ecosystems within the park are home to many species of fish, turtles, dolphins, and seabirds, along with an abundance of invertebrates such as sponges, molluscs, and crustaceans. Coral reefs within the park are particularly important, providing vital habitats for many species, including the endangered Acropora species of corals.

The park's seagrass meadows also provide critical food and shelter for a range of species, including dugongs and green sea turtles, while mangroves and estuaries support juvenile fish populations. These habitats make the Great Sandy Marine Park an ecologically significant region for marine conservation.

== Grey Nurse Shark Breeding ==
One of the most significant features of the Great Sandy Marine Park is its role as a breeding and nursery area for the grey nurse shark (Carcharias taurus), a species that is categorised as critically endangered on the International Union for Conservation of Nature Red List. The park's waters provide a safe and relatively undisturbed environment for these sharks, which are known for their distinctive, elongated bodies and sharp teeth.

Wolf Rock, near Rainbow Beach, is one of only four key aggregation sites for grey nurse sharks in south-east Queensland and is the only known gestation site for the Australian east coast grey nurse shark population. The designated area incorporates the base of Double Island Point, Round Rock and the Pinnacles, being areas of key habitat for the grey nurse shark.

The Great Sandy Marine Park is one of the few remaining locations in Australia where grey nurse sharks reliably breed, making it an essential region for the species' conservation. The importance of protecting these breeding grounds has been recognised by both local and international marine conservation groups, and the area is subject to strict management to mitigate threats such as overfishing, pollution, and habitat degradation.

== Conservation efforts ==
The Great Sandy Marine Park is managed by the Queensland Government under the Great Sandy Marine Park Zoning Plan, which aims to protect the park’s unique ecosystems while allowing for sustainable use. The park is divided into multiple zones, each with different levels of protection depending on the activities allowed. Zones include conservation areas, buffer zones, and areas for recreational use, which help minimise human impact on sensitive environments.

Efforts to protect the grey nurse shark and other species have led to the establishment of specific conservation initiatives within the park, including monitoring programs, awareness campaigns, and collaborative efforts with research institutions.
