= 1983 Australian Labor Party leadership spill =

1983 Australian Labor Party Leadership spill
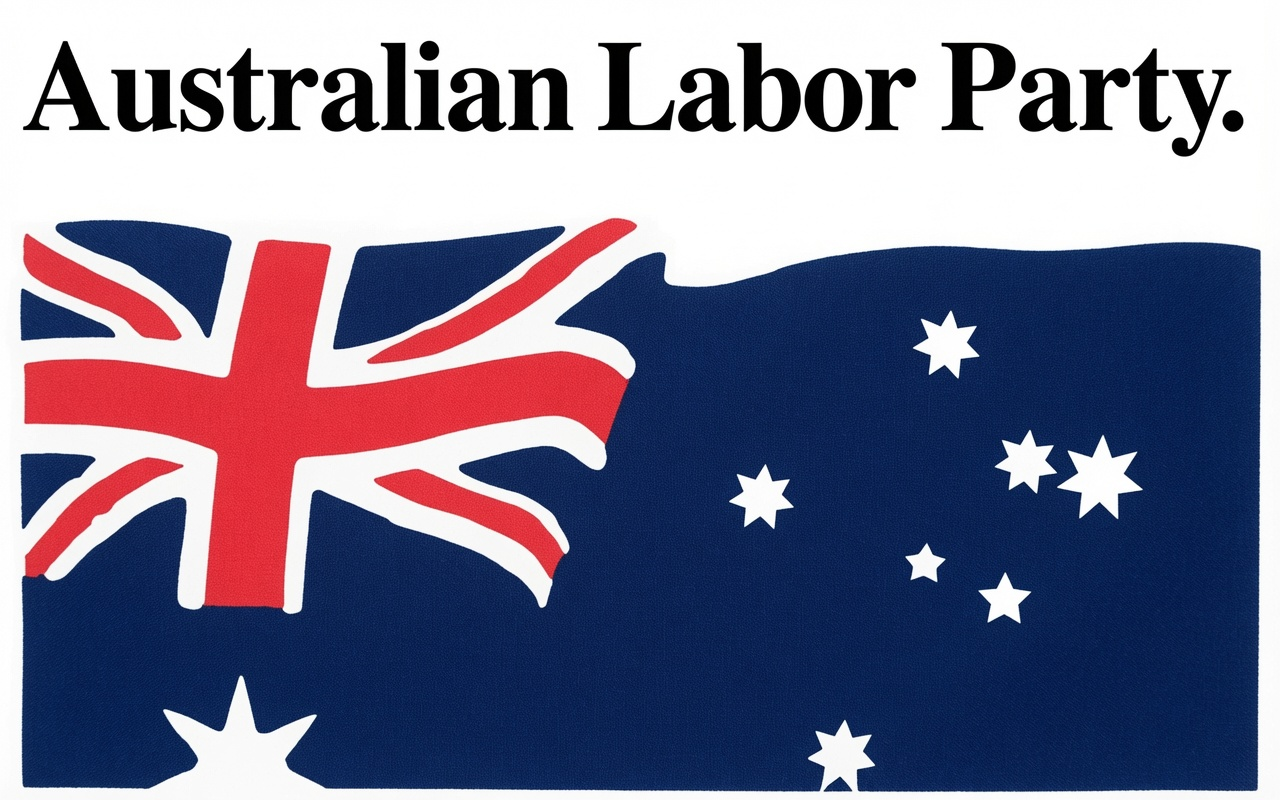
- 8 February 1983
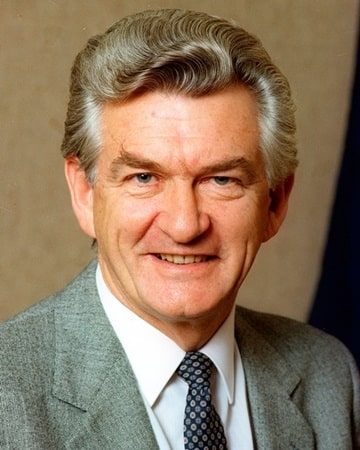
Candidate	Bob Hawke
Caucus vote	Unopposed
Leader before election
Bill Hayden
Elected Leader
Bob Hawke

A leadership spill in the Australian Labor Party, the opposition party in the Parliament of Australia, was held on 8 February 1983. It saw the resignation of leader Bill Hayden followed by the election of Bob Hawke.

== Background ==
Bill Hayden had been leader of the Labor Party since shortly after the 1977 landslide defeat, and he led the party to a much improved result at the 1980 election. However, after only just surviving a challenge from Shadow Minister for Industrial Relations Bob Hawke, a disappointing by-election result in December 1982 caused many to question his ability to win the impending federal election. With a second challenge from Hawke imminent, Hayden resigned as party leader on 3 February 1983 and Hawke was elected, in the caucus ballot held on 8 February, unopposed.

== Candidates ==
- Bob Hawke, Shadow Minister for Industrial Relations, Employment, Youth Affairs, Member for Wills

== Aftermath ==
On the same day Hayden resigned, Liberal Prime Minister Malcolm Fraser had announced a snap election hoping to capitalise on Labor's disunity and go to the polls against Hayden rather than Hawke. However, the plan backfired as Labor managed to secure the transition from Hayden to the more popular and charismatic Hawke just in time as the election was announced. Later that afternoon at a press conference, Hayden famously said that "a drover's dog could lead the Labor Party to victory, the way the country is". The ensuing federal election was easily won by Labor and Hawke became prime minister.

== See also ==
- 1983 Australian federal election
