= Brian Courtice =

Australian politician

Member of the Australian Parliament for Hinkler
- In office 11 July 1987 – 13 March 1993
- Preceded by: Bryan Conquest
- Succeeded by: Paul Neville

Personal details
- Born: 17 April 1950 (age 76) Bundaberg, Queensland
- Party: Labor (c. 1973–2005)
- Relations: Ben Courtice (uncle)
- Occupation: Cane farmer, union organiser

Brian William Courtice (born 17 April 1950) is a former Australian politician and trade unionist. He represented the Division of Hinkler in federal parliament from 1987 to 1993 as a member of the Australian Labor Party (ALP). He was expelled from the party in 2005.

== Early life ==
Courtice was born in Bundaberg, Queensland. His uncle Ben Courtice was an ALP senator and government minister. He was a cane farmer and organiser with the Australian Workers' Union (AWU) before entering parliament.

== Parliament ==
Courtice stood for the newly created Division of Hinkler at the 1984 federal election, narrowly losing to National Party candidate Bryan Conquest. He defeated Conquest in a re-match at the 1987 election. He increased his majority at the 1990 election but Paul Neville regained the seat for the Nationals in 1993. He was unsuccessful in an attempt to recapture the seat in 1996.

Courtice served as head of the Hawke and Keating governments' Country Task Force. In 1990, as chair of the ALP caucus primary industries and resources committee, he delivered a report which concluded that the government "had been conned by green groups and would risk future electoral success if it continued to 'appease' them". Courtice publicly supported Paul Keating against Bob Hawke in the June 1991 ALP leadership spill. In 1992, he was a member of the Caucus Joint Working Group on Homosexual Policy in the Australian Defence Force, where he opposed allowing gay people to serve in the military.

== Later political involvement ==
In 1994, Courtice began working in the office of federal resources minister David Beddall, with responsibility for Queensland projects. He unsuccessfully stood against Bill Ludwig for the state secretaryship of the AWU in 1997. He appeared before the Shepherdson Inquiry and publicly accused Ludwig of "orchestrating electoral fraud in Queensland".

Courtice was expelled from the ALP in 2005 "on the grounds he had brought it into disrepute". He had been a party member for 32 years. His expulsion came after he leaked party documents to state Nationals MP Rob Messenger, which "purportedly exposed the 'siphoning' of $7,000 in branch funds". He had also alleged that his wife Marcia had lost ALP preselection for the state seat of Bundaberg due to a "dirty factional deal". His wife was subsequently sacked from her job as a staffer for Bundaberg MP Nita Cunningham and brought an unfair dismissal claim.

In the lead-up to the 2007 federal election, Courtice appeared in a Liberal Party election advertisement warning voters against ALP leader Kevin Rudd but denied that this made him a "Labor rat" despite his expulsion from the party in 2005.

In response, shadow education minister Stephen Smith described him as "someone who we've known for a long time has been disillusioned, disaffected, distressed and disappointed at his own exit from parliament and public life, and probably bitter". In 2009, Courtice held a press conference with Liberal National Party of Queensland MP Rob Messenger criticising the factionalism of the state ALP. In 2019 he publicly criticised the Queensland ALP government for "stalling" the approval of the Carmichael coal mine.

== Other activities ==
Courtice's family property Sunnyside Sugar Plantation outside of Bundaberg contains the unmarked graves of 29 South Sea Islanders, who were buried there in the 19th century after being blackbirded. His grandfather bought the property in the 1920s and he grew up hearing stories about burials. The gravesites were eventually found in 2012 and the site was heritage-listed. Courtice has campaigned for greater recognition of South Sea Islanders. He has collected a "large brief of evidence on South Sea Islander slavery, including verbal testimony taken during the 1990s from an elderly Bundaberg resident whose relatives had direct experience with the slave trade". In 2020, in response to Prime Minister Scott Morrison's comments about slavery in Australia, he said "the majority of Australians don't know our history" and invited Morrison to come to Sunnyside. He also called for the history of South Sea Islanders to be taught in schools.

Parliament of Australia
Preceded by Bryan Conquest	Member for Hinkler; 1987–1993	Succeeded by Paul Neville
