= Elliott River (Queensland) =

Elliott Eliott
- Location of Elliott River mouth in Queensland
- Etymology: In honour of Gilbert Eliott

Location
- Country: Australia
- State: Queensland
- Region: Wide Bay-Burnett

Physical characteristics
- Source
  - location: Elliott
  - coordinates: 25.00787°S 152.21410°E}
  - elevation: 30 m (98 ft)
- Mouth: Coral Sea
  - location: Elliott Heads
  - coordinates: 24°55′25″S 152°29′35″E
  - elevation: 0 m (0 ft)
- Length: 25 km (16 mi)
- Basin size: 727 km^{2} (281 sq mi)

Basin features
- Tributaries
  - left: Gillens Creek, Yellow Waterholes Creek
  - right: Mahogany Creek

The Elliott River is a river in the Wide Bay–Burnett region of Queensland, Australia.

The headwaters of the river rise in the west of the locality of Elliott approximately 21 kilometres (13 mi) south-west of Bundaberg and flows in an easterly direction. The river crosses the Goodwood Road passing through the suburb of Elliot and entering the Elliott River Fish Habitat Area and then discharging in the Coral Sea near Elliott Heads. The river descends 30 metres (98 ft) over its 25-kilometre (16 mi) course.

The river has a catchment area of 727 square kilometres (281 sq mi) of which an area of 11 square kilometres (4 sq mi) is composed of estuarine wetlands.

The river was named in honour of Gilbert Eliott, a public servant and politician who served as Speaker of the Legislative Assembly of Queensland between 1860 and 1870, and was Member for Wide Bay during the same term. The spelling of the river has been changed to double "l" over time.

== See also ==
- List of rivers of Australia § Queensland
