= Division of Hinkler =

Australian federal electoral division

Coordinates: 25.183°S 152.385°E

Hinkler Australian House of Representatives Division
- Interactive map of boundaries since the 2019 federal election
- Created: 1984
- MP: David Batt
- Party: Nationals
- Namesake: Bert Hinkler
- Electors: 127,816 (2025)
- Area: 3,504 km^{2} (1,352.9 sq mi)
- Demographic: Provincial and rural
Electorates around Hinkler:
| Flynn | Coral Sea | Coral Sea |
| Flynn | Hinkler | Wide Bay |
| Flynn | Wide Bay | Wide Bay |

The Division of Hinkler is an Australian Electoral Division in Queensland. It includes the city of Bundaberg and its surrounds. The most recent member for Hinkler is David Batt of the National Party, who was elected in 2025.

== Geography ==
Since 1984, federal electoral division boundaries in Australia have been determined at redistributions by a redistribution committee appointed by the Australian Electoral Commission. Redistributions occur for the boundaries of divisions in a particular state, and they occur every seven years, or sooner if a state's representation entitlement changes or when divisions of a state are malapportioned.

== History ==
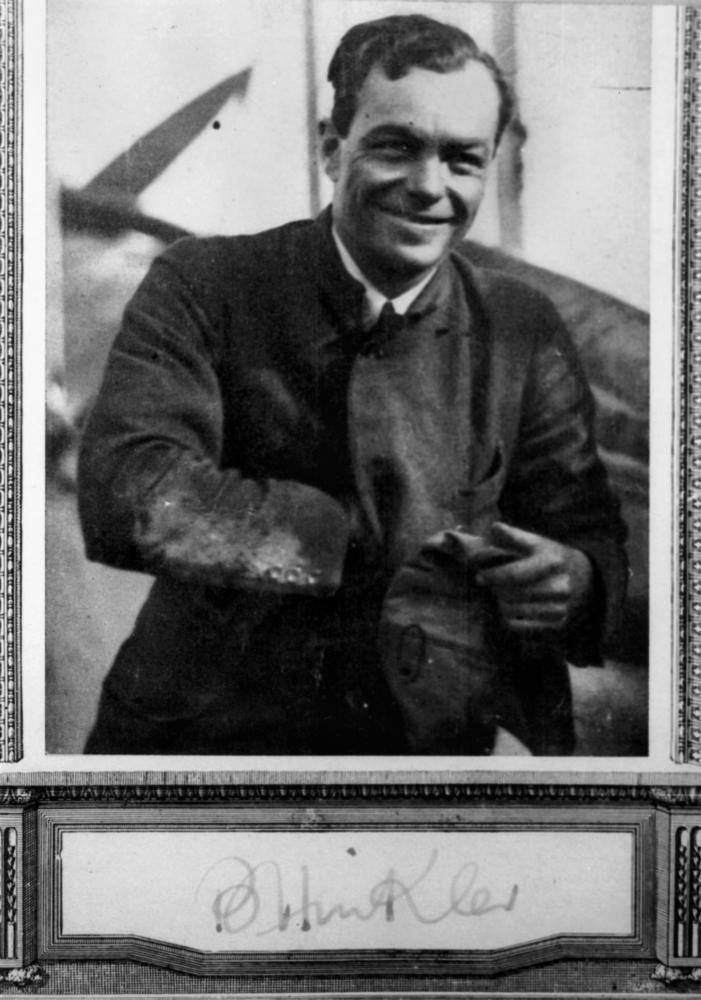
Bert Hinkler, the division's namesake

The division was created in 1984 and is named after Bert Hinkler, the great pioneer Australian aviator.

The seat is located in coastal Queensland, including the towns of Bundaberg, Hervey Bay, Childers, Gayndah and Monto.

The electoral division had previously centred on Gladstone and its surrounding area. On those boundaries, it was a marginal seat that traded hands between the Australian Labor Party and the National Party of Australia. However, after a redistribution in 2006, the Gladstone area, a Labor bastion, was transferred to the Division of Flynn. This seemingly consolidated the Nationals' hold on the seat. While National incumbent Paul Neville was nearly swept out in 2007 due in part to Queensland swinging heavily to Labor under Kevin Rudd, he survived in part due to Labor-leaning Gladstone being replaced with conservative-leaning Hervey Bay. He was reelected with a large enough swing in 2010 to turn Hinkler into a safe seat for the merged Liberal National Party.

== Members ==
| Image | Member | Party | Term | Notes |
|---|---|---|---|---|
| | Bryan Conquest (1930–2018) | Nationals | 1 December 1984 – 11 July 1987 | Lost seat |
| | Brian Courtice (1950–) | Labor | 11 July 1987 – 13 March 1993 | Lost seat |
| | Paul Neville (1940–2019) | Nationals (Note: Member of the Liberal National Party of Queensland sitting with the federal parliamentary National Party.) | 13 March 1993 – 5 August 2013 | Retired |
| | Keith Pitt (1969–) | Nationals | 7 September 2013 – 19 January 2025 | Served as minister under Morrison. Resigned |
| | David Batt (1971–) | Nationals | 3 May 2025 | Incumbent |

== Election results ==
2025 Australian federal election: Hinkler
| Party | Candidate | Votes | % | ±% |
|---|---|---|---|---|
| Liberal National | David Batt | 41,569 | 38.01 | −4.12 |
| Labor | Trish Mears | 34,104 | 31.18 | +7.87 |
| One Nation | Tyler Carman | 14,498 | 13.26 | +4.55 |
| Greens | Andrew McLean | 8,000 | 7.31 | +1.83 |
| Trumpet of Patriots | Robert Blohberger | 4,220 | 3.86 | +3.86 |
| Family First | Kerry Petrus | 3,778 | 3.45 | +3.45 |
| Independent | Michael O'Brien | 3,201 | 2.93 | +2.93 |
| Total formal votes | | 109,370 | 95.37 | −1.36 |
| Informal votes | | 5,307 | 4.63 | +1.36 |
| Turnout | | 114,677 | 89.80 | +0.31 |
Two-party-preferred result
| Liberal National | David Batt | 61,534 | 56.26 | −3.81 |
| Labor | Trish Mears | 47,836 | 43.74 | +3.81 |
| Liberal National hold | | Swing | −3.81 | |
