= Electoral results for the Division of Griffith =

Australian division election results

This is a list of electoral results for the Division of Griffith in Australian federal elections from the division's creation in 1934 until the present.

== Members ==
Member	Party	Term
Francis Baker	Labor	1934–1939
William Conelan	Labor	1939–1949
Doug Berry	Liberal	1949–1954
Wilfred Coutts	Labor	1954–1958
Arthur Chresby	Liberal	1958–1961
Wilfred Coutts	Labor	1961–1966
Don Cameron	Liberal	1966–1977
Ben Humphreys	Labor	1977–1996
Graeme McDougall	Liberal	1996–1998
Kevin Rudd	Labor	1998–2013
Terri Butler	Labor	2014–2022
Max Chandler-Mather	Greens	2022–2025
Renee Coffey	Labor	2025–present

== Election results ==
=== Elections in the 2020s ===
==== 2025 ====
2025 Australian federal election: Griffith
Party	Candidate	Votes	%	±%
Labor	Renee Coffey	35,756	34.70	+5.76
Greens	Max Chandler-Mather	32,396	31.44	−3.15
Liberal National	Anthony Bishop	27,553	26.74	−4.00
One Nation	Lindsay Bell	2,472	2.40	−0.90
People First	Dion Hunt	2,350	2.28	+2.28
Trumpet of Patriots	Aaron Hayes	1,534	1.49	+1.49
Family First	Andrea Campbell	980	0.95	+0.95
Total formal votes		103,041	97.85	−0.15
Informal votes		2,260	2.15	+0.15
Turnout		105,301	84.96	−4.49
Two-candidate-preferred result
Labor	Renee Coffey	62,851	61.00	+61.00
Greens	Max Chandler-Mather	40,190	39.00	−21.45
Labor gain from Greens				

Results are not final. Last updated on 14 May 2025 at 9:00 PM AEST.

==== 2022 ====
2022 Australian federal election: Griffith
Party	Candidate	Votes	%	±%
Greens	Max Chandler-Mather	36,771	34.59	+10.94
Liberal National	Olivia Roberts	32,685	30.74	−10.23
Labor	Terri Butler	30,769	28.94	−2.01
One Nation	Shari Ware	3,504	3.30	+1.18
United Australia	Robert McMullan	2,581	2.43	+0.98
Total formal votes		106,310	98.00	+0.26
Informal votes		2,169	2.00	−0.26
Turnout		108,479	89.45	−1.60
Notional two-party-preferred count
Labor	Terri Butler	64,923	61.07	+8.21
Liberal National	Olivia Roberts	41,387	38.93	−8.21
Two-candidate-preferred result
Greens	Max Chandler-Mather	64,271	60.46	+60.46
Liberal National	Olivia Roberts	42,039	39.54	−7.59
Greens gain from Labor				

Alluvial diagram for preference flows in the seat of Griffith in the 2022 federal election. indicates at what stage the winning candidate had over 50% of the votes and was declared the winner.

=== Elections in the 2010s ===
==== 2019 ====
2019 Australian federal election: Griffith
Party	Candidate	Votes	%	±%
Liberal National	Olivia Roberts	40,816	40.97	−0.21
Labor	Terri Butler	30,836	30.95	−2.18
Greens	Max Chandler-Mather	23,562	23.65	+6.67
One Nation	Julie Darlington	2,109	2.12	+2.12
United Australia	Christian Julius	1,444	1.45	+1.45
Conservative National	Tony Murray	850	0.85	+0.85
Total formal votes		99,617	97.74	+1.81
Informal votes		2,302	2.26	−1.81
Turnout		101,919	91.05	+0.87
Two-party-preferred result
Labor	Terri Butler	52,659	52.86	+1.43
Liberal National	Olivia Roberts	46,958	47.14	−1.43
Labor hold		Swing	+1.43	

==== 2016 ====
2016 Australian federal election: Griffith
Party	Candidate	Votes	%	±%
Liberal National	Fiona Ward	37,716	41.00	−1.12
Labor	Terri Butler	30,524	33.18	−7.22
Greens	Karen Anderson	15,710	17.08	+6.83
Liberal Democrats	Bronwyn Ablett	1,880	2.04	+2.04
Drug Law Reform	John Jiggens	1,789	1.94	+1.94
Liberty Alliance	Matt Darragh	1,477	1.61	+1.61
Independent	Karel Boele	1,463	1.59	+1.59
Family First	Theresa Graham	1,424	1.55	+0.80
Total formal votes		91,983	95.94	+0.71
Informal votes		3,897	4.06	−0.71
Turnout		95,880	90.60	−2.54
Two-party-preferred result
Labor	Terri Butler	47,464	51.60	−1.50
Liberal National	Fiona Ward	44,519	48.40	+1.50
Labor hold		Swing	−1.50	

==== 2014 by-election ====
2014 Griffith by-election
Party	Candidate	Votes	%	±%
Liberal National	Bill Glasson	34,491	44.38	+2.16
Labor	Terri Butler	30,023	38.63	−1.73
Greens	Geoff Ebbs	7,635	9.82	−0.36
Pirate	Melanie Thomas	1,172	1.51	+1.51
Katter's Australian	Ray Sawyer	821	1.06	+0.37
Family First	Christopher Williams	729	0.94	+0.20
Stable Population	Timothy Lawrence	666	0.86	+0.67
Independent	Travis Windsor	656	0.84	+0.84
Bullet Train	Anthony Ackroyd	602	0.77	+0.77
Independent	Karel Boele	504	0.65	+0.65
Secular	Anne Reid	424	0.55	+0.04
Total formal votes		77,723	96.82	+1.58
Informal votes		2,552	3.18	−1.58
Turnout		80,275	82.03	−11.11
Two-party-preferred result
Labor	Terri Butler	40,229	51.76	−1.25
Liberal National	Bill Glasson	37,494	48.24	+1.25
Labor hold		Swing	−1.25	

==== 2013 ====
2013 Australian federal election: Griffith
Party	Candidate	Votes	%	±%
Liberal National	Bill Glasson	36,481	42.22	+6.42
Labor	Kevin Rudd	34,878	40.36	−3.72
Greens	Geoff Ebbs	8,799	10.18	−5.21
Palmer United	Karin Hunter	2,903	3.36	+3.36
Independent	Greg Sowden	705	0.82	+0.82
Family First	Adam Kertesz	643	0.74	−0.71
Katter's Australian	Luke Murray	595	0.69	+0.69
Secular	Anne Reid	445	0.51	+0.51
Rise Up Australia	Sherrilyn Church	418	0.48	+0.48
Socialist Alliance	Liam Flenady	377	0.44	+0.44
Stable Population	Jan McNicol	165	0.19	+0.19
Total formal votes		86,409	95.24	+0.13
Informal votes		4,323	4.76	−0.13
Turnout		90,732	93.14	+1.81
Two-party-preferred result
Labor	Kevin Rudd	45,805	53.01	−5.45
Liberal National	Bill Glasson	40,604	46.99	+5.45
Labor hold		Swing	−5.45	

==== 2010 ====
2010 Australian federal election: Griffith
Party	Candidate	Votes	%	±%
Labor	Kevin Rudd	35,445	44.08	−9.01
Liberal National	Rebecca Docherty	28,784	35.80	+1.82
Greens	Emma-Kate Rose	12,378	15.39	+7.54
Liberal Democrats	Gregory Romans	1,866	2.32	+2.10
Family First	Jesse Webb	1,163	1.45	+0.66
Revolutionary Socialist	Hamish Chitts	601	0.75	+0.75
Citizens Electoral Council	Jan Pukallus	175	0.22	+0.22
Total formal votes		80,412	95.11	−2.01
Informal votes		4,137	4.89	+2.01
Turnout		84,549	91.32	−2.30
Two-party-preferred result
Labor	Kevin Rudd	47,007	58.46	−3.86
Liberal National	Rebecca Docherty	33,405	41.54	+3.86
Labor hold		Swing	−3.86	

=== Elections in the 2000s ===
==== 2007 ====
2007 Australian federal election: Griffith
Party	Candidate	Votes	%	±%
Labor	Kevin Rudd	43,957	53.09	+4.31
Liberal	Craig Thomas	28,133	33.98	−3.49
Greens	Willy Bach	6,496	7.85	−0.97
Independent	P M Howard	2,264	2.73	+2.73
Democrats	Rob Cotterill	819	0.99	−0.33
Family First	Andrew Hassall	654	0.79	−1.17
Socialist Alliance	Jim McIlroy	293	0.35	−0.35
Liberty & Democracy	Samantha Myers	182	0.22	+0.22
Total formal votes		82,798	97.12	+1.38
Informal votes		2,457	2.88	−1.38
Turnout		85,255	93.62	−0.20
Two-party-preferred result
Labor	Kevin Rudd	51,600	62.32	+3.84
Liberal	Craig Thomas	31,198	37.68	−3.84
Labor hold		Swing	+3.84	

==== 2004 ====
2004 Australian federal election: Griffith
Party	Candidate	Votes	%	±%
Labor	Kevin Rudd	39,247	48.74	+3.20
Liberal	Janelle Payne	30,032	37.30	−0.44
Greens	Darryl Rosin	7,237	8.99	+3.55
Family First	James Turner	1,572	1.95	+1.95
Democrats	Bruce Carnwell	1,084	1.35	−1.59
Independent	Derek Rosborough	768	0.95	+0.95
Socialist Alliance	Lynda Hansen	580	0.72	+0.72
Total formal votes		80,520	95.74	−0.15
Informal votes		3,585	4.26	+0.15
Turnout		84,105	92.47	−2.46
Two-party-preferred result
Labor	Kevin Rudd	47,207	58.63	+2.48
Liberal	Janelle Payne	33,313	41.37	−2.48
Labor hold		Swing	+2.48	

==== 2001 ====
2001 Australian federal election: Griffith
Party	Candidate	Votes	%	±%
Labor	Kevin Rudd	40,707	48.57	+4.40
Liberal	Ross Vasta	32,249	38.48	−1.79
Democrats	David Rendell	3,829	4.57	−0.36
Greens	Rob Wilson	2,671	3.19	+0.54
One Nation	Edmund McMahon	2,220	2.65	−4.33
National	Ann Graham	1,591	1.90	+1.90
	Joseph Rooke	547	0.65	+0.65
Total formal votes		83,814	95.82	−1.75
Informal votes		3,660	4.18	+1.75
Turnout		87,474	95.25	
Two-party-preferred result
Labor	Kevin Rudd	46,654	55.66	+3.23
Liberal	Ross Vasta	37,160	44.34	−3.23
Labor hold		Swing	+3.23	

=== Elections in the 1990s ===
==== 1998 ====
1998 Australian federal election: Griffith
Party	Candidate	Votes	%	±%
Labor	Kevin Rudd	35,121	44.17	+2.82
Liberal	Graeme McDougall	32,018	40.26	−3.52
One Nation	Neil Jorgensen	5,546	6.97	+6.97
Democrats	Iain Renton	3,920	4.93	−1.28
Greens	Greg George	2,108	2.65	+0.08
Women's Party	Jeni Eastwood	807	1.01	−0.23
Total formal votes		79,520	97.56	−0.04
Informal votes		1,986	2.44	+0.04
Turnout		81,506	94.45	−0.31
Two-party-preferred result
Labor	Kevin Rudd	41,689	52.43	+3.93
Liberal	Graeme McDougall	37,831	47.57	−3.93
Labor gain from Liberal		Swing	+3.93	

==== 1996 ====
1996 Australian federal election: Griffith
Party	Candidate	Votes	%	±%
Liberal	Graeme McDougall	33,262	43.78	+7.42
Labor	Kevin Rudd	31,407	41.34	−6.89
Democrats	Iain Renton	4,714	6.21	+1.62
National	David Stone	2,818	3.71	+0.19
Greens	Barry Wilson	1,951	2.57	−1.60
Women's Party	Jeni Eastwood	947	1.25	+1.25
Independent	Gary Holland	401	0.53	+0.53
Independent	Coral Wynter	296	0.39	−0.49
Indigenous Peoples	John Leslie	172	0.23	+0.08
Total formal votes		75,968	97.59	+0.17
Informal votes		1,878	2.41	−0.17
Turnout		77,846	94.76	+0.42
Two-party-preferred result
Liberal	Graeme McDougall	38,981	51.47	+7.37
Labor	Kevin Rudd	36,761	48.53	−7.37
Liberal gain from Labor		Swing	+7.37	

==== 1993 ====
1993 Australian federal election: Griffith
Party	Candidate	Votes	%	±%
Labor	Ben Humphreys	37,090	49.47	+1.52
Liberal	Mick Privitera	25,663	34.23	−0.63
Democrats	Gavin Kernot	3,525	4.70	−8.51
Greens	Barry Wilson	3,368	4.49	+4.49
National	David Stone	2,631	3.51	+0.56
	Coral Wynter	948	1.26	+1.26
Independent	Steven Dickson	938	1.25	+1.25
Natural Law	Maxine Weston	810	1.08	+1.08
Total formal votes		74,973	97.25	−0.29
Informal votes		2,122	2.75	+0.29
Turnout		77,095	94.34	
Two-party-preferred result
Labor	Ben Humphreys	43,425	57.98	−0.04
Liberal	Mick Privitera	31,473	42.02	+0.04
Labor hold		Swing	−0.04	

==== 1990 ====
1990 Australian federal election: Griffith
Party	Candidate	Votes	%	±%
Labor	Ben Humphreys	31,616	49.8	−4.7
Liberal	Doug Edwards	20,580	32.4	+8.3
Democrats	Steven Lyndon	8,431	13.3	+5.7
National	Sean Cousins	1,872	2.9	−11.0
Democratic Socialist	Russel Norman	963	1.5	+1.5
Total formal votes		63,462	97.2	
Informal votes		1,812	2.8	
Turnout		65,274	93.0	
Two-party-preferred result
Labor	Ben Humphreys	38,179	60.3	−0.1
Liberal	Doug Edwards	25,155	39.7	+0.1
Labor hold		Swing	−0.1	

=== Elections in the 1980s ===
==== 1987 ====
1987 Australian federal election: Griffith
Party	Candidate	Votes	%	±%
Labor	Ben Humphreys	33,442	54.5	+0.1
Liberal	Wayne Black	14,778	24.1	+1.0
National	Sean Cousins	8,550	13.9	−2.4
Democrats	Lance Winter	4,647	7.6	+2.5
Total formal votes		61,417	95.7	
Informal votes		2,754	4.3	
Turnout		64,171	89.0	
Two-party-preferred result
Labor	Ben Humphreys	37,098	60.4	+0.1
Liberal	Wayne Black	24,312	39.6	−0.1
Labor hold		Swing	+0.1	

==== 1984 ====
1984 Australian federal election: Griffith
Party	Candidate	Votes	%	±%
Labor	Ben Humphreys	31,786	54.4	+0.0
Liberal	Kaylene Low	13,519	23.1	−13.3
National	Sean Cousins	9,521	16.3	+16.3
Democrats	Daniel Roth	2,996	5.1	−1.6
Socialist Workers	Helen Jones	592	1.0	−0.1
Total formal votes		58,414	93.6	
Informal votes		4,024	6.4	
Turnout		62,438	89.1	
Two-party-preferred result
Labor	Ben Humphreys	35,199	60.3	−0.7
Liberal	Kaylene Low	23,203	39.7	+0.7
Labor hold		Swing	−0.7	

==== 1983 ====
1983 Australian federal election: Griffith
Party	Candidate	Votes	%	±%
Labor	Ben Humphreys	32,597	57.9	+2.1
Liberal	Graham Young	18,545	32.9	+5.2
Democrats	Carole Ames	3,777	6.7	+2.4
Socialist Labour	Michael Fulton	750	1.3	+1.3
Socialist Workers	Julie Walkington	620	1.1	−2.9
Total formal votes		56,289	97.7	
Informal votes		1,301	2.3	
Turnout		57,590	89.2	
Two-party-preferred result
Labor	Ben Humphreys		64.5	+1.6
Liberal	Graham Young		35.5	−1.6
Labor hold		Swing	+1.6	

==== 1980 ====
1980 Australian federal election: Griffith
Party	Candidate	Votes	%	±%
Labor	Ben Humphreys	32,249	55.8	+8.8
Liberal	Dennis Young	16,019	27.7	−5.8
National Country	Noel Willersdorf	4,732	8.2	−1.5
Democrats	Gillian Newman	2,474	4.3	−3.6
Socialist Workers	Mark Carey	2,293	4.0	+4.0
Total formal votes		57,767	97.1	
Informal votes		1,707	2.9	
Turnout		59,474	91.9	
Two-party-preferred result
Labor	Ben Humphreys		62.9	+9.4
Liberal	Dennis Young		37.1	−9.4
Labor hold		Swing	+9.4	

=== Elections in the 1970s ===
==== 1977 ====
1977 Australian federal election: Griffith
Party	Candidate	Votes	%	±%
Labor	Ben Humphreys	28,736	47.0	−1.1
Liberal	Ronald Palmer	20,471	33.5	−16.6
National Country	Stan Fas	5,935	9.7	+9.7
Democrats	Thomas Martin	4,857	7.9	+7.9
Independent	William Kenney	591	1.0	+1.0
Progress	Barrie Rundle	514	0.8	−1.0
Total formal votes		61,104	96.8	
Informal votes		2,025	3.2	
Turnout		63,129	92.8	
Two-party-preferred result
Labor	Ben Humphreys		53.5	+5.0
Liberal	Ronald Palmer		46.5	−5.0
Labor gain from Liberal		Swing	+5.0	

==== 1975 ====
1975 Australian federal election: Griffith
Party	Candidate	Votes	%	±%
Liberal	Don Cameron	31,483	56.6	+7.6
Labor	Ben Humphreys	23,133	41.6	−6.1
Workers	Wallace Younger	975	1.8	+1.8
Total formal votes		55,591	98.6	
Informal votes		772	1.4	
Turnout		56,363	94.9	
Two-party-preferred result
Liberal	Don Cameron		58.0	+6.6
Labor	Ben Humphreys		42.0	−6.6
Liberal hold		Swing	+6.6	

==== 1974 ====
1974 Australian federal election: Griffith
Party	Candidate	Votes	%	±%
Liberal	Don Cameron	27,381	49.0	+5.6
Labor	Clem Jones	26,657	47.7	+0.8
Independent	Cecil Birchley	1,185	2.1	+2.1
Australia	Beth Smith	609	1.1	−1.9
Total formal votes		55,832	98.4	
Informal votes		901	1.6	
Turnout		56,733	94.8	
Two-party-preferred result
Liberal	Don Cameron	28,690	51.4	+1.1
Labor	Clem Jones	27,142	48.6	−1.1
Liberal hold		Swing	+1.1	

==== 1972 ====
1972 Australian federal election: Griffith
Party	Candidate	Votes	%	±%
Labor	Eddie Foat	24,523	46.9	+0.1
Liberal	Don Cameron	22,649	43.4	−0.6
Democratic Labor	Cecil Birchley	3,526	6.7	−1.2
Australia	Beth Smith	1,544	3.0	+3.0
Total formal votes		52,242	97.7	
Informal votes		1,203	2.3	
Turnout		53,445	95.0	
Two-party-preferred result
Liberal	Don Cameron	26,302	50.3	−1.2
Labor	Eddie Foat	25,940	49.7	+1.2
Liberal hold		Swing	−1.2	

=== Elections in the 1960s ===
==== 1969 ====
1969 Australian federal election: Griffith
Party	Candidate	Votes	%	±%
Labor	Barry Gorman	25,416	46.8	+4.6
Liberal	Don Cameron	23,907	44.0	−5.7
Democratic Labor	Cecil Birchley	4,314	7.9	+1.0
Independent	Trevor Sturling	699	1.3	+1.3
Total formal votes		54,336	98.3	
Informal votes		913	1.7	
Turnout		55,249	93.9	
Two-party-preferred result
Liberal	Don Cameron	27,970	51.5	−4.3
Labor	Barry Gorman	26,366	48.5	+4.3
Liberal hold		Swing	−4.3	

==== 1966 ====
1966 Australian federal election: Griffith
Party	Candidate	Votes	%	±%
Labor	Wilfred Coutts	17,755	46.9	−7.6
Liberal	Don Cameron	17,047	45.0	+6.3
Democratic Labor	John Fitz-Gibbon	2,633	6.9	+0.2
Communist	Vic Slater	456	1.2	+1.2
Total formal votes		37,891	97.5	
Informal votes		989	2.5	
Turnout		38,880	94.8	
Two-party-preferred result
Liberal	Don Cameron	19,346	51.1	+6.9
Labor	Wilfred Coutts	18,545	48.9	−6.9
Liberal gain from Labor		Swing	+6.9	

==== 1963 ====
1963 Australian federal election: Griffith
Party	Candidate	Votes	%	±%
Labor	Wilfred Coutts	21,239	54.5	−0.9
Liberal	Keith Grant	15,097	38.7	+3.6
Democratic Labor	Paul Tucker	2,627	6.7	−2.9
Total formal votes		38,963	97.0	
Informal votes		1,204	3.0	
Turnout		40,167	94.8	
Two-party-preferred result
Labor	Wilfred Coutts		55.8	−1.5
Liberal	Keith Grant		44.2	+1.5
Labor hold		Swing	−1.5	

==== 1961 ====
1961 Australian federal election: Griffith
Party	Candidate	Votes	%	±%
Labor	Wilfred Coutts	21,392	55.4	+9.1
Liberal	Arthur Chresby	13,549	35.1	−4.5
Queensland Labor	Donald McKenna	3,700	9.6	−4.5
Total formal votes		38,641	96.6	
Informal votes		1,353	3.4	
Turnout		39,994	94.2	
Two-party-preferred result
Labor	Wilfred Coutts		57.3	+7.4
Liberal	Arthur Chresby		42.7	−7.4
Labor gain from Liberal		Swing	+7.4	

=== Elections in the 1950s ===
==== 1958 ====
1958 Australian federal election: Griffith
Party	Candidate	Votes	%	±%
Labor	Wilfred Coutts	18,136	46.3	−5.0
Liberal	Arthur Chresby	15,493	39.6	−9.1
Queensland Labor	Gregory Kehoe	5,507	14.1	+14.1
Total formal votes		39,136	96.4	
Informal votes		1,479	3.6	
Turnout		40,615	96.1	
Two-party-preferred result
Liberal	Arthur Chresby	19,593	50.1	+1.4
Labor	Wilfred Coutts	19,543	49.9	−1.4
Liberal gain from Labor		Swing	+1.4	

==== 1955 ====
1955 Australian federal election: Griffith
Party	Candidate	Votes	%	±%
Labor	Wilfred Coutts	20,936	51.3	−3.4
Liberal	Doug Berry	19,896	48.7	+3.4
Total formal votes		40,832	97.8	
Informal votes		920	2.2	
Turnout		41,752	94.4	
Labor hold		Swing	−3.4	

==== 1954 ====
1954 Australian federal election: Griffith
Party	Candidate	Votes	%	±%
Labor	Wilfred Coutts	16,003	50.4	+4.1
Liberal	Doug Berry	15,768	49.6	−4.1
Total formal votes		31,771	99.0	
Informal votes		320	1.0	
Turnout		32,091	96.2	
Labor gain from Liberal		Swing	+4.1	

==== 1951 ====
1951 Australian federal election: Griffith
Party	Candidate	Votes	%	±%
Liberal	Doug Berry	19,019	53.7	+2.0
Labor	William Thieme	16,373	46.3	+0.0
Total formal votes		35,392	97.6	
Informal votes		852	2.4	
Turnout		36,244	95.5	
Liberal hold		Swing	+1.8	

=== Elections in the 1940s ===
==== 1949 ====
1949 Australian federal election: Griffith
Party	Candidate	Votes	%	±%
Liberal	Doug Berry	18,381	51.7	+1.3
Labor	William Conelan	16,464	46.3	−3.3
Communist	Anna Slater	727	2.0	+2.0
Total formal votes		35,572	96.8	
Informal votes		1,179	3.2	
Turnout		36,751	95.2	
Two-party-preferred result
Liberal	Doug Berry		51.9	+1.5
Labor	William Conelan		48.1	−1.5
Liberal hold		Swing	+1.5	

==== 1946 ====
1946 Australian federal election: Griffith
Party	Candidate	Votes	%	±%
Labor	William Conelan	33,725	50.1	−7.3
Liberal	William Scott	25,960	38.6	+9.4
Services	Arthur Chresby	7,565	11.2	+11.2
Total formal votes		67,260	96.4	
Informal votes		2,518	3.6	
Turnout		69,778	94.8	
Two-party-preferred result
Labor	William Conelan		53.9	−11.2
Liberal	William Scott		46.1	+11.2
Labor hold		Swing	−11.2	

==== 1943 ====
1943 Australian federal election: Griffith
Party	Candidate	Votes	%	±%
Labor	William Conelan	38,138	57.4	+6.9
United Australia	Richard Larking	19,388	29.2	−20.3
One Parliament	John Carbine	3,900	5.9	+5.9
Independent	William Kingwell	3,756	5.7	+5.7
Independent	Theophilus Dunstone	1,210	1.8	+1.8
Total formal votes		66,392	96.9	
Informal votes		2,115	3.1	
Turnout		68,507	96.3	
Two-party-preferred result
Labor	William Conelan		65.1	+14.6
United Australia	Richard Larking		34.9	−14.6
Labor hold		Swing	+14.6	

==== 1940 ====
1940 Australian federal election: Griffith
Party	Candidate	Votes	%	±%
Labor	William Conelan	30,529	50.5	+2.2
United Australia	Peter McCowan	29,879	49.5	+8.3
Total formal votes		60,408	97.8	
Informal votes		1,347	2.2	
Turnout		61,755	96.4	
Labor hold		Swing	+0.2	

=== Elections in the 1930s ===
==== 1939 by-election ====
1939 Griffith by-election
Party	Candidate	Votes	%	±%
Labor	William Conelan	22,967	41.3	−7.0
United Australia	Peter McCowan	17,168	30.9	−10.3
Protestant Labour	Everett Graham	15,437	27.8	+27.8
Total formal votes		55,572	98.2	
Informal votes		1,025	1.8	
Turnout		56,597	91.6	
Two-party-preferred result
Labor	William Conelan	27,790	50.0	−0.3
United Australia	Peter McCowan	27,782	50.0	+0.3
Labor hold		Swing	−0.3	

==== 1937 ====
1937 Australian federal election: Griffith
Party	Candidate	Votes	%	±%
Labor	Francis Baker	27,864	48.3	−5.1
United Australia	Dugald Clark	23,756	41.2	+6.1
Social Credit	William Moore	6,108	10.6	−0.9
Total formal votes		57,728	97.2	
Informal votes		1,681	2.8	
Turnout		59,409	97.4	
Two-party-preferred result
Labor	Francis Baker	29,026	50.3	−8.9
United Australia	Dugald Clark	28,702	49.7	+8.9
Labor hold		Swing	−8.9	

==== 1934 ====
1934 Australian federal election: Griffith
Party	Candidate	Votes	%	±%
Labor	Francis Baker	28,184	53.4	−6.1
United Australia	George Mocatta	18,494	35.1	−3.4
Social Credit	Julius Streeter	6,076	11.5	+11.5
Total formal votes		52,754	97.3	
Informal votes		1,464	2.7	
Turnout		54,218	96.1	
Two-party-preferred result
Labor	Francis Baker		59.2	−1.3
United Australia	George Mocatta		40.8	+1.3
Labor notional hold		Swing	−1.3	
