= List of whips in the Australian House of Representatives =

Whips have managed business and maintained party discipline for Australia's federal political parties in the House of Representatives since Federation. The term has origins in the British parliamentary system. As the number of members of parliament and amount of business before the House has increased, so too has the number of whips. The three parties represented in the first Parliament each appointed one whip. Each of today's three main parties appoint a chief whip, while the Australian Labor Party and Liberals each have an additional two whips and the Nationals have one additional whip. Until 1994, a party's more senior whip held the title "Whip", while the more junior whip was styled "Deputy Whip". In 1994, those titles became "Chief Whip" and "Whip", respectively. The current Chief Government Whip in the House of Representatives is Joanne Ryan of the Australian Labor Party, in office since 31 May 2022. The most recent Chief Opposition Whip in the House of Representatives was Bert van Manen of the Liberal Party, who lost his seat of Forde after the 2025 election; the Liberals have now appointed Aaron Violi as the Chief Opposition Whip to succeed him in the upcoming 48th Parliament.

While many whips have gone on to serve as ministers, only three have gone on to lead their parties: Labor's Frank Tudor, the Country Party's Earle Page, and the National Party's Mark Vaile. Page is the only one of them to have served as prime minister (albeit for only a short time), and Vaile is the only one to have served as deputy prime minister. Tudor, less auspiciously, was the only of them to serve as leader of the opposition.

Page was also one of four people to serve as whip while representing Cowper, the others being Francis Clarke (Protectionist), John Thomson (Commonwealth Liberal and Nationalist), and Garry Nehl (National). As of May 2025, one other constituency has the same distinction: Griffith, represented by William Conelan, Wilfred Coutts, Don Cameron, and Ben Humphreys — all of them belonging to the Labor Party except for Cameron (a Liberal). Oddly, the last three served in the seat consecutively from 1961 to 1996, although Coutts had previously represented the division from 1954 to 1958.

== Australian Labor Party ==
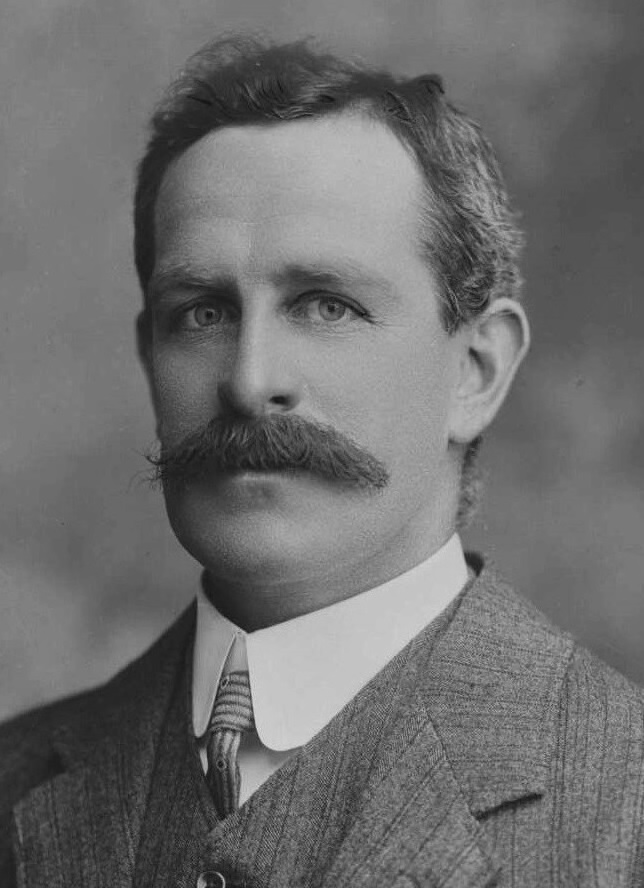
Frank Tudor, Labor's first whip and its sixth leader.

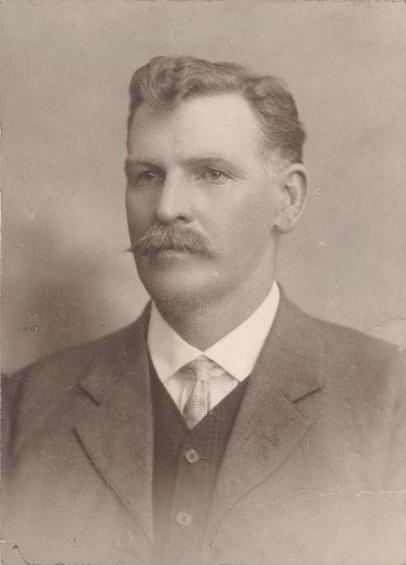
James Fenton, Labor Whip 1921–1928, was a minister in the Scullin government, serving for a time as Acting Prime Minister. He later left Labor and joined the UAP, serving as Postmaster General at the creation of the ABC.

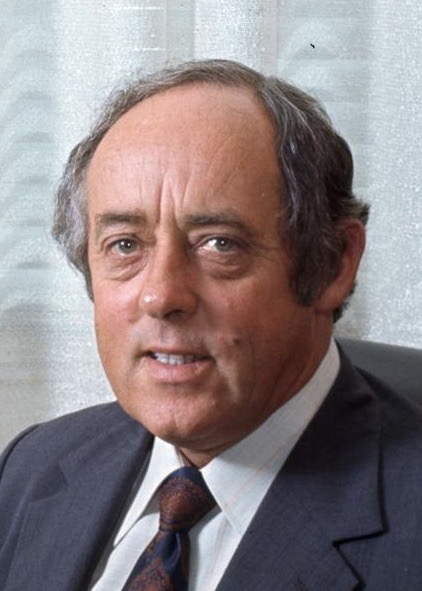
Les Johnson, Labor Whip 1977–1983, later served as Deputy Speaker and as High Commissioner in New Zealand.

Whip	Date	Deputy Whip	Date	Leader
Frank Tudor (Yarra)	12 June 1901			Chris Watson
Frank Tudor (Yarra)	12 June 1901			Andrew Fisher
David Watkins (Newcastle)	12 November 1908			Andrew Fisher
David Watkins (Newcastle)	12 November 1908			Frank Tudor
Jim Page (Maranoa)	8 July 1913			Frank Tudor
James Fenton (Maribyrnong)	3 June 1921 (Note: Fenton became acting Whip at Page's death. The arrangement was made permanent on 29 September that year.)			Frank Tudor
James Fenton (Maribyrnong)	3 June 1921			Matthew Charlton
James Fenton (Maribyrnong)	3 June 1921			James Scullin
Edward Charles Riley (Cook)	22 October 1929			James Scullin
George Lawson (Brisbane)	22 October 1934			James Scullin
George Lawson (Brisbane)	22 October 1934			John Curtin
William Conelan (Griffith)	6 October 1941			John Curtin
Tom Sheehan (Cook)	20 September 1943			John Curtin
Tom Sheehan (Cook)	20 September 1943			Ben Chifley
Arthur Fuller (Hume)	31 October 1946			Ben Chifley
Fred Daly (Grayndler)	21 February 1950			Ben Chifley
Fred Daly (Grayndler)	21 February 1950			H. V. Evatt
Gil Duthie (Wilmot)	13 February 1956			H. V. Evatt
Gil Duthie (Wilmot)	13 February 1956			Arthur Calwell
Gil Duthie (Wilmot)	13 February 1956	Wilfred Coutts (Griffith)	c. 1963 (Note: Gil Duthie, the Labor Whip, noted in a debate in November 1968 that the position of Deputy Whip had been created in the Labor party at his request "four or five" years before his speech. That puts the post's creation in the 24th Parliament, which sat from 20 February 1962 to 30 October 1963, or the 25th Parliament, which sat from 25 February 1963 to 28 October 1966. In a debate in 1963, Duthie referred to Coutts as the "Deputy Whip", though it is unclear whether the title had yet been formalised. Coutts participated as a teller, a key duty of a whip, in all divisions in 1962, 1963, and 1964 where Labor and the Coalition were on opposite sides except two in May 1964 and the ones during and immediately before a trip on parliamentary business as part of Australia's delegation to the Commonwealth Parliamentary Association.)	Arthur Calwell
Gil Duthie (Wilmot)	13 February 1956	Bert James (Hunter)	8 February 1967	Gough Whitlam
Brendan Hansen (Wide Bay)	18 December 1972	Martin Nicholls (Bonython)	18 December 1972	Gough Whitlam
Martin Nicholls (Bonython)	10 June 1974 (Note: Nicholls and James were the Whip and Deputy Whip, respectively for the 29th Parliament. Caucus elections were held on 10 June 1974.)	Bert James (Hunter)	10 June 1974	Gough Whitlam
Les Johnson (Note: Later Deputy Speaker of the House of Representatives.) (Hughes)	9 March 1977	Bert James (Hunter)	10 June 1974	Gough Whitlam
Les Johnson (Hughes)	9 March 1977	Bert James (Hunter)	10 June 1974	Bill Hayden
Les Johnson (Hughes)	9 March 1977	Keith Johnson (Burke)	2 February 1978	Bill Hayden
Les Johnson (Hughes)	9 March 1977	Ben Humphreys (Griffith)	8 November 1980 (Note: Humphreys was the Deputy Whip beginning with the 32nd Parliament, and caucus elections were held on 8 November 1980.)	Bill Hayden
Ben Humphreys (Griffith)	10 March 1983	Barry Cunningham (McMillan)	10 March 1983	Bob Hawke
Barry Cunningham (McMillan)	14 September 1987	Tony Lamb (La Trobe)	14 September 1987	Bob Hawke
George Gear (Canning)	8 May 1990	Ted Grace (Fowler)	8 May 1990	Bob Hawke
George Gear (Canning)	8 May 1990	Ted Grace (Fowler)	8 May 1990	Paul Keating
Leo McLeay (Note: Previously Speaker of the Australian House of Representatives) (Watson)	24 March 1993	Ted Grace (Fowler)	8 May 1990	Paul Keating

The position of Government Chief Whip was created on 12 May 1994. The one Deputy Government Whip was replaced by two Government Whips.

Chief Whip	Date	Whip	Date	Whip	Date	Leader
Leo McLeay (Watson)	12 May 1994	Ted Grace (Fowler)	12 May 1994	Rod Sawford (Port Adelaide)	12 May 1994	Paul Keating
Leo McLeay (Watson)	12 May 1994	Ted Grace (Fowler)	12 May 1994	Rod Sawford (Port Adelaide)	12 May 1994	Kim Beazley
Leo McLeay (Watson)	12 May 1994	Bob Sercombe (Maribyrnong)	20 October 1998	Rod Sawford (Port Adelaide)	12 May 1994	Kim Beazley
Janice Crosio (Prospect)	22 November 2001	Michael Danby (Melbourne Ports)	22 November 2001	Harry Quick (Franklin)	22 November 2001	Simon Crean
Janice Crosio (Prospect)	22 November 2001	Michael Danby (Melbourne Ports)	22 November 2001	Harry Quick (Franklin)	22 November 2001	Mark Latham
Roger Price (Chifley)	22 October 2004	Michael Danby (Melbourne Ports)	22 November 2001	Jill Hall (Shortland)	22 October 2004	Mark Latham
Roger Price (Chifley)	22 October 2004	Michael Danby (Melbourne Ports)	22 November 2001	Jill Hall (Shortland)	22 October 2004	Kim Beazley
Roger Price (Chifley)	22 October 2004	Michael Danby (Melbourne Ports)	22 November 2001	Jill Hall (Shortland)	22 October 2004	Kevin Rudd
Roger Price (Chifley)	22 October 2004	Chris Hayes (Fowler)	3 December 2007	Jill Hall (Shortland)	22 October 2004	Kevin Rudd
Roger Price (Chifley)	22 October 2004	Chris Hayes (Fowler)	3 December 2007	Jill Hall (Shortland)	22 October 2004	Julia Gillard
Joel Fitzgibbon (Hunter)	27 September 2010	Chris Hayes (Fowler)	3 December 2007	Jill Hall (Shortland)	22 October 2004	Julia Gillard
Joel Fitzgibbon (Hunter)	27 September 2010	Ed Husic (Chifley)	5 July 2011	Jill Hall (Shortland)	22 October 2004	Julia Gillard
Joel Fitzgibbon (Hunter)	27 September 2010	Ed Husic (Chifley)	5 July 2011	Janelle Saffin (Page)	27 November 2012	Julia Gillard
Chris Hayes (Fowler)	14 May 2013	Graham Perrett (Moreton)	14 May 2013	Rob Mitchell (McEwen)	14 May 2013	Julia Gillard
Chris Hayes (Fowler)	14 May 2013	Graham Perrett (Moreton)	14 May 2013	Rob Mitchell (McEwen)	14 May 2013	Kevin Rudd
Chris Hayes (Fowler)	14 May 2013	Jill Hall (Shortland)	14 October 2013	Joanne Ryan (Lalor)	16 October 2013	Bill Shorten
Chris Hayes (Fowler)	14 May 2013	Graham Perrett (Moreton)	30 August 2016	Joanne Ryan (Lalor)	16 October 2013	Bill Shorten
Chris Hayes (Fowler)	14 May 2013	Anne Stanley (Werriwa)	2 July 2019	Joanne Ryan (Lalor)	16 October 2013	Anthony Albanese
Joanne Ryan (Lalor)	31 May 2022	Anne Stanley (Werriwa)	2 July 2019	David Smith (Bean)	31 May 2022	Anthony Albanese

== Coalition ==
=== Liberal Party of Australia ===
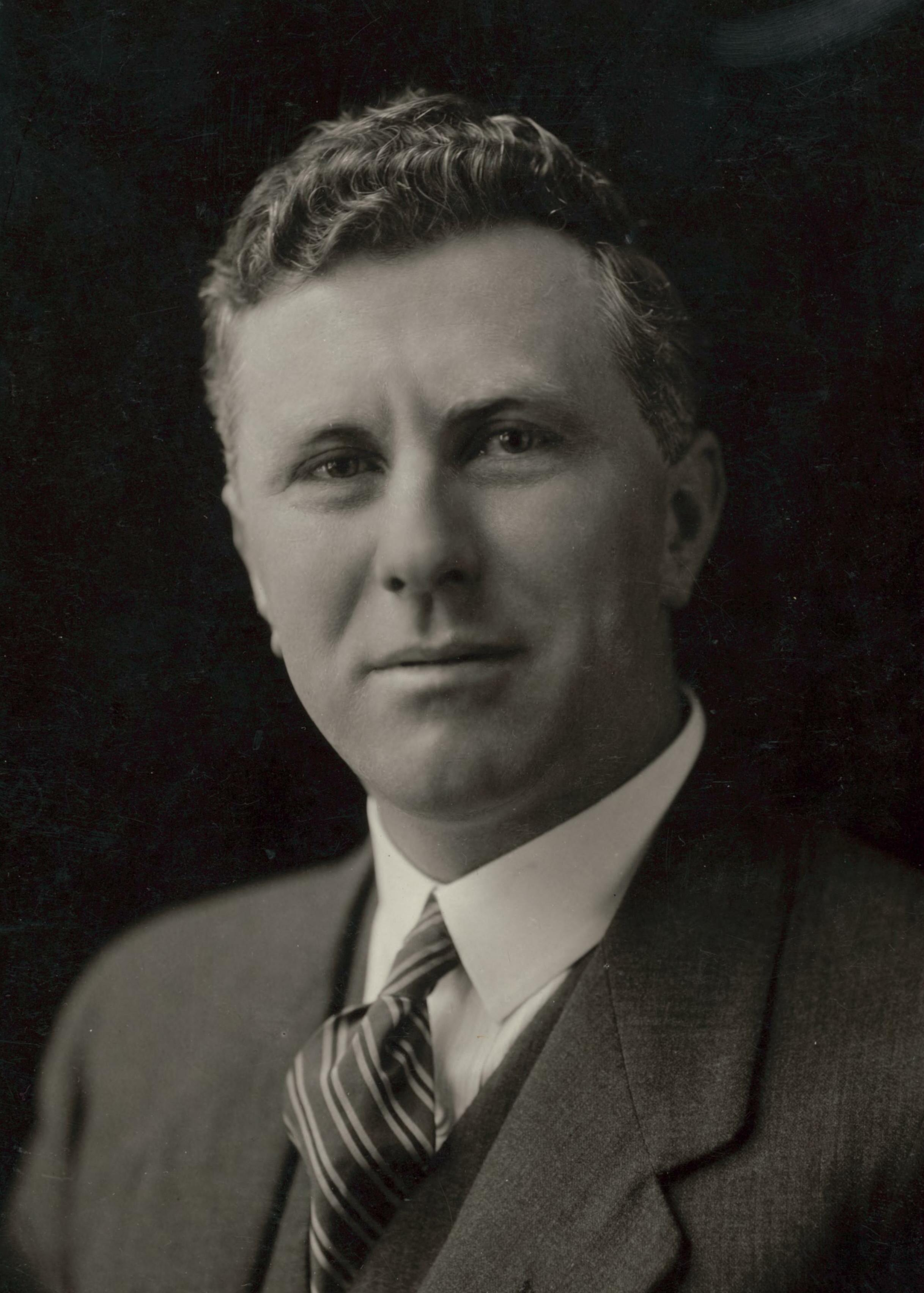
Allan Guy, the Liberals' 1st whip, lost his seat to Gil Duthie, eventually a Labor whip.

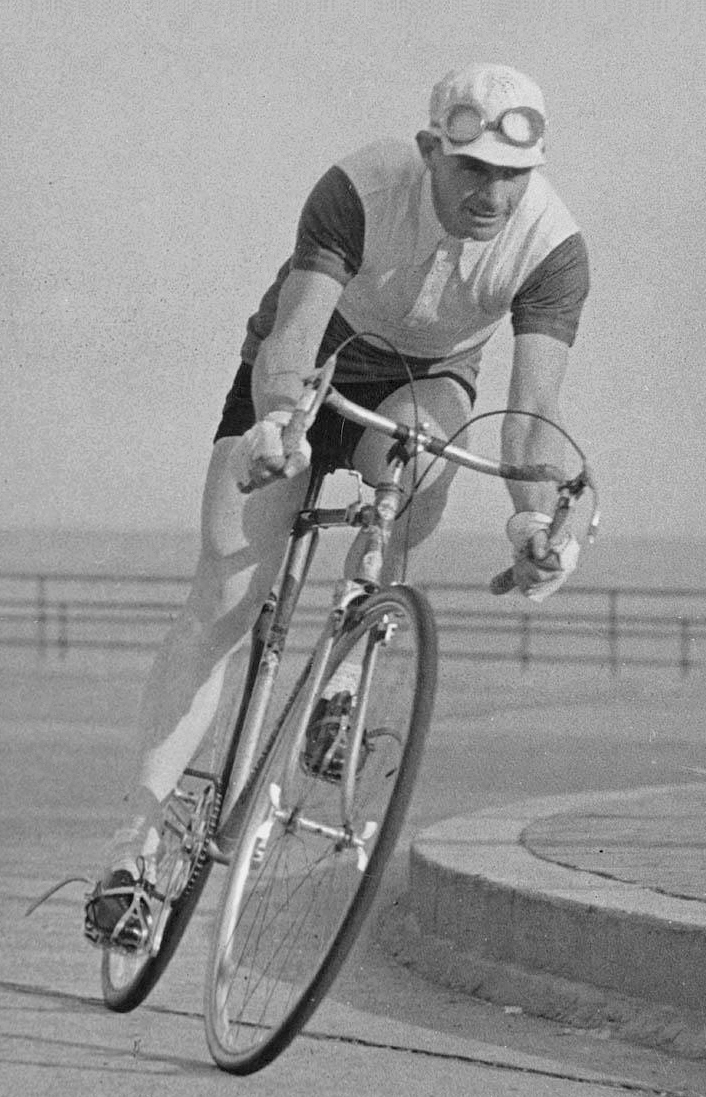
Hubert "Oppy" Opperman, whip 1955–60, was a world-famous cyclist, and later a Cabinet minister.

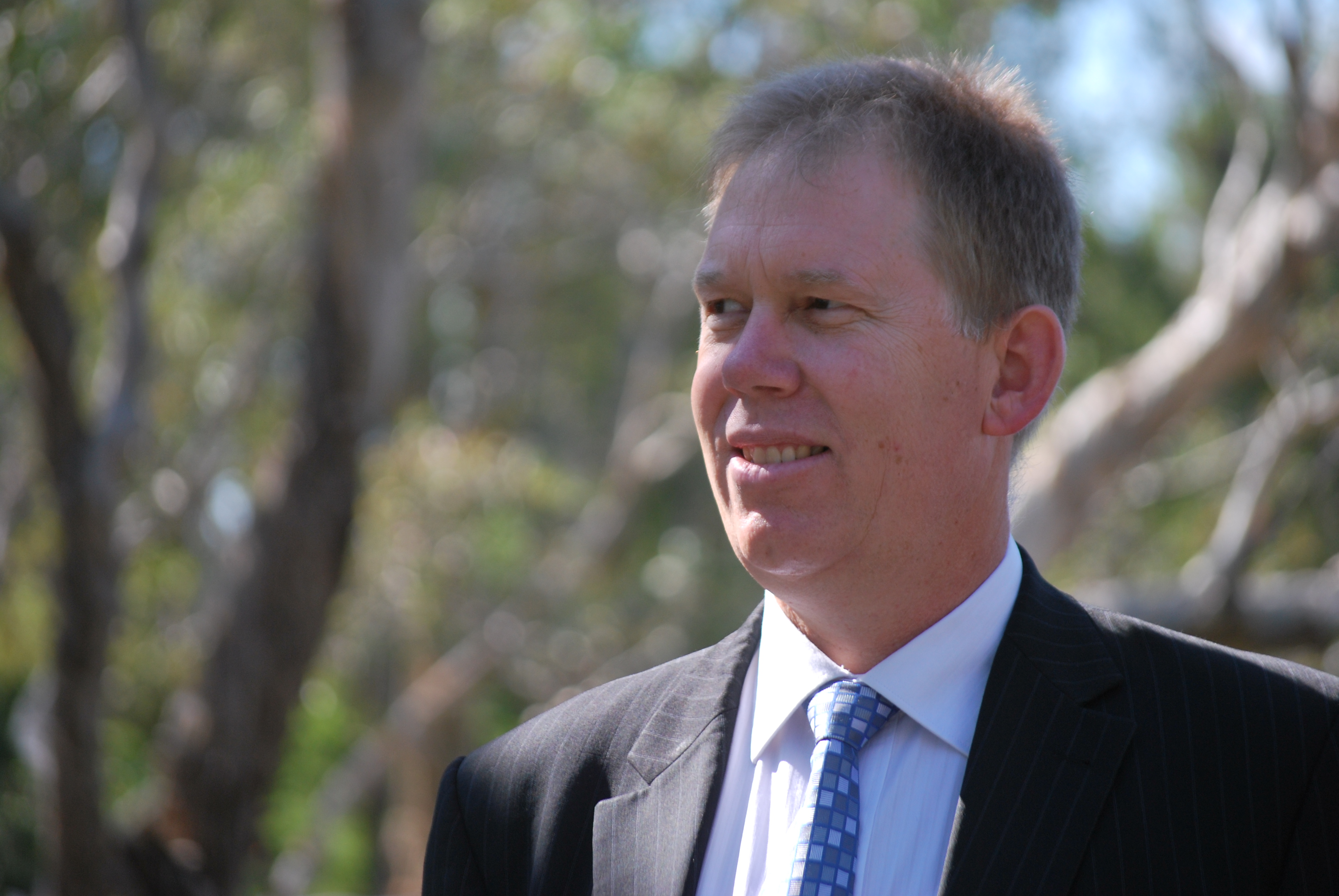
Bern van Manen, Chief Government Whip from 2019 to 2025.

Whip	Date	Deputy Whip	Date	Leader
Allan Guy (Wilmot)	21 February 1945 (Note: Allan Guy was appointed whip of the United Australia Party on 12 February 1941 He continued as whip of the new Liberal Party from the founding of the parliamentary party, announced by Robert Menzies on 21 February 1945.)			Robert Menzies
Allan McDonald (Corangamite)	8 November 1946			Robert Menzies
Jo Gullett (Henty)	16 February 1950			Robert Menzies
Jo Gullett (Henty)	16 February 1950	Reginald Swartz (Darling Downs)	c. Sept 1950	Robert Menzies
Jo Gullett (Henty)	16 February 1950	Hubert Opperman (Corio)	20 August 1952	Robert Menzies
Hubert Opperman (Corio)	15 December 1955	Henry Pearce (Capricornia)	Unknown (Note: While the date is uncertain, it is clear that Pearce was Deputy Whip at the time of his promotion to Whip.)	Robert Menzies
Henry Pearce (Capricornia)	5 February 1960	William Aston (Note: Later Speaker of the Australian House of Representatives) (Phillip)	10 March 1960	Robert Menzies
Fred Chaney, Sr. (Perth)	23 January 1962	Peter Howson (Fawkner)	23 February 1962	Robert Menzies
Peter Howson (Fawkner)	22 December 1963	William Aston (Phillip)	22 December 1963	Robert Menzies
William Aston (Phillip)	10 June 1964	Bert Kelly (Wakefield)	c. August 1964 (Note: Parliament adjourned on 20 May 1964 and returned on 11 August. On 10 June, the Whip, Peter Howson, was promoted to Minister for Air, and his deputy, William Aston, was promoted to replace him. Kelly then replaced Aston as Deputy Whip. A National Archives of Australia document records his service as 1 August 1964 to 28 February 1967. Unfortunately, those documents use the first or last day of a month for the date a term began or ended, respectively, when the exact day is unknown. This can be seen, for example, with Kelly's end date of 28 February 1967, when the actual date was in fact 21 February. It is likely therefore that Kelly's appointment happened somewhere from 1 to 11 August 1964. It is also possible that he was appointed Deputy Whip as early as 10 June and that the document is based on paperwork filed when the House of Representatives convened in August.)	Robert Menzies
William Aston (Phillip)	10 June 1964	Bert Kelly (Wakefield)	c. August 1964	Harold Holt
Dudley Erwin (Ballarat)	21 February 1967	James Killen (Moreton)	21 February 1967	Harold Holt
Dudley Erwin (Ballarat)	21 February 1967	Kevin Cairns (Lilley)	23 August 1967	Harold Holt
Dudley Erwin (Ballarat)	21 February 1967	Kevin Cairns (Lilley)	23 August 1967	John Gorton
Max Fox (Henty)	12 February 1969	Kevin Cairns (Lilley)	23 August 1967	John Gorton
Max Fox (Henty)	12 February 1969	Geoffrey Giles (Angas)	24 November 1969	John Gorton
Max Fox (Henty)	12 February 1969	Geoffrey Giles (Angas)	24 November 1969	William McMahon
Max Fox (Henty)	12 February 1969	Geoffrey Giles (Angas)	24 November 1969	Billy Snedden
Victor Garland (Curtin)	14 June 1974	Don Cameron (Griffith)	14 June 1974	Billy Snedden
Victor Garland (Curtin)	14 June 1974	Don Cameron (Griffith)	14 June 1974	Malcolm Fraser
John Bourchier (Bendigo)	26 March 1975	Don Cameron (Griffith)	14 June 1974	Malcolm Fraser
John Bourchier (Bendigo)	26 March 1975	John Hodges (Petrie)	16 March 1978	Malcolm Fraser
John Bourchier (Bendigo)	26 March 1975	Ross McLean (Perth)	May 1982	Malcolm Fraser
Don Dobie (Cook)	16 March 1983	Ewen Cameron (Indi)	16 March 1983	Andrew Peacock
Ewen Cameron (Indi)	9 September 1985	Neil Andrew (Wakefield)	9 September 1985	John Howard
Michael MacKellar (Warringah)	12 May 1989	David Hawker (Wannon)	12 May 1989	Andrew Peacock
Bob Halverson (Casey)	11 April 1990	Neil Andrew (Wakefield)	11 April 1990	John Hewson
Rod Atkinson (Isaacs)	7 April 1993	Paul Filing (Moore)	7 April 1993	John Hewson

Chief Whip	Date	Whip	Date	Whip	Date	Leader
Bob Halverson (Note: Halverson and Hawker were appointed Liberal Whip and Deputy Whip, respectively, on 26 May 1994, but took the new titles of Chief Whip and Whip a week later, on 2 June.) (Casey)	26 May 1994	David Hawker (Wannon)	26 May 1994	John Bradford (McPherson)	2 June 1994	Alexander Downer
Bob Halverson (Casey)	26 May 1994	David Hawker (Wannon)	26 May 1994	Kathy Sullivan (Note: As Kathy Martin, Sullivan served as the Liberal deputy whip in the Senate from 1975 to 1977.) (Moncrieff)	20 October 1994	Alexander Downer
Bob Halverson (Casey)	26 May 1994	David Hawker (Wannon)	26 May 1994	Kathy Sullivan (Moncrieff)	20 October 1994	John Howard
Alan Cadman (Mitchell)	11 March 1996	Stewart McArthur (Corangamite)	11 March 1996	Trish Worth (Adelaide)	11 March 1996	John Howard
Neil Andrew (Wakefield)	11 July 1997	Stewart McArthur (Corangamite)	11 March 1996	Peter Slipper (Fisher)	11 July 1997	John Howard
Michael Ronaldson (Ballarat)	18 October 1998	Stewart McArthur (Corangamite)	11 March 1996	Kay Elson (Forde)	18 October 1998	John Howard
Jim Lloyd (Robertson)	23 November 2001	Stewart McArthur (Corangamite)	11 March 1996	Joanna Gash (Gilmore)	23 November 2001	John Howard
Kerry Bartlett (Macquarie)	18 July 2004	Stewart McArthur (Corangamite)	11 March 1996	Joanna Gash (Gilmore)	23 November 2001	John Howard
Alex Somlyay (Fairfax)	12 February 2008	Nola Marino (Forrest)	12 February 2008	Michael Johnson (Ryan)	12 February 2008	Brendan Nelson
Alex Somlyay (Fairfax)	12 February 2008	Nola Marino (Forrest)	12 February 2008	Michael Johnson (Ryan)	12 February 2008	Malcolm Turnbull
Alex Somlyay (Fairfax)	12 February 2008	Nola Marino (Forrest)	12 February 2008	Michael Johnson (Ryan)	12 February 2008	Tony Abbott
Alex Somlyay (Fairfax)	12 February 2008	Nola Marino (Forrest)	12 February 2008	Patrick Secker (Barker)	26 February 2010	Tony Abbott
Warren Entsch (Leichhardt)	14 September 2010	Nola Marino (Forrest)	12 February 2008	Patrick Secker (Barker)	26 February 2010	Tony Abbott
Philip Ruddock (Berowra)	18 September 2013	Nola Marino (Forrest)	12 February 2008	Scott Buchholz (Wright)	18 September 2013	Tony Abbott
Scott Buchholz (Wright)	13 February 2015	Nola Marino (Forrest)	12 February 2008	Andrew Nikolic (Bass)	13 February 2015	Tony Abbott
Nola Marino (Forrest)	12 October 2015	Ewen Jones (Herbert)	12 October 2015	Brett Whiteley (Braddon)	12 October 2015	Malcolm Turnbull
Nola Marino (Forrest)	12 October 2015	Bert van Manen (Forde)	30 August 2016	Rowan Ramsey (Grey)	30 August 2016	Malcolm Turnbull
Nola Marino (Forrest)	12 October 2015	Bert van Manen (Forde)	30 August 2016	Rowan Ramsey (Grey)	30 August 2016	Scott Morrison
Bert van Manen (Forde)	28 May 2019	Nicolle Flint (Boothby)	28 May 2019	Rowan Ramsey (Grey)	30 August 2016	Scott Morrison
Bert van Manen (Forde)	28 May 2019	Melissa Lee Price (Durack)	26 July 2022	Rowan Ramsey (Grey)	30 August 2016	Peter Dutton
Aaron Violi (Casey)	28 May 2025	Cameron Caldwell (Fadden)	28 May 2025	Henry Pike (Bowman)	28 May 2025	Sussan Ley
Cameron Caldwell (Fadden)	23 February 2026	Ben Small (Forrest)	23 February 2026	Mary Aldred (Monash)	23 February 2026	Angus Taylor

=== Country Party/National Party of Australia ===
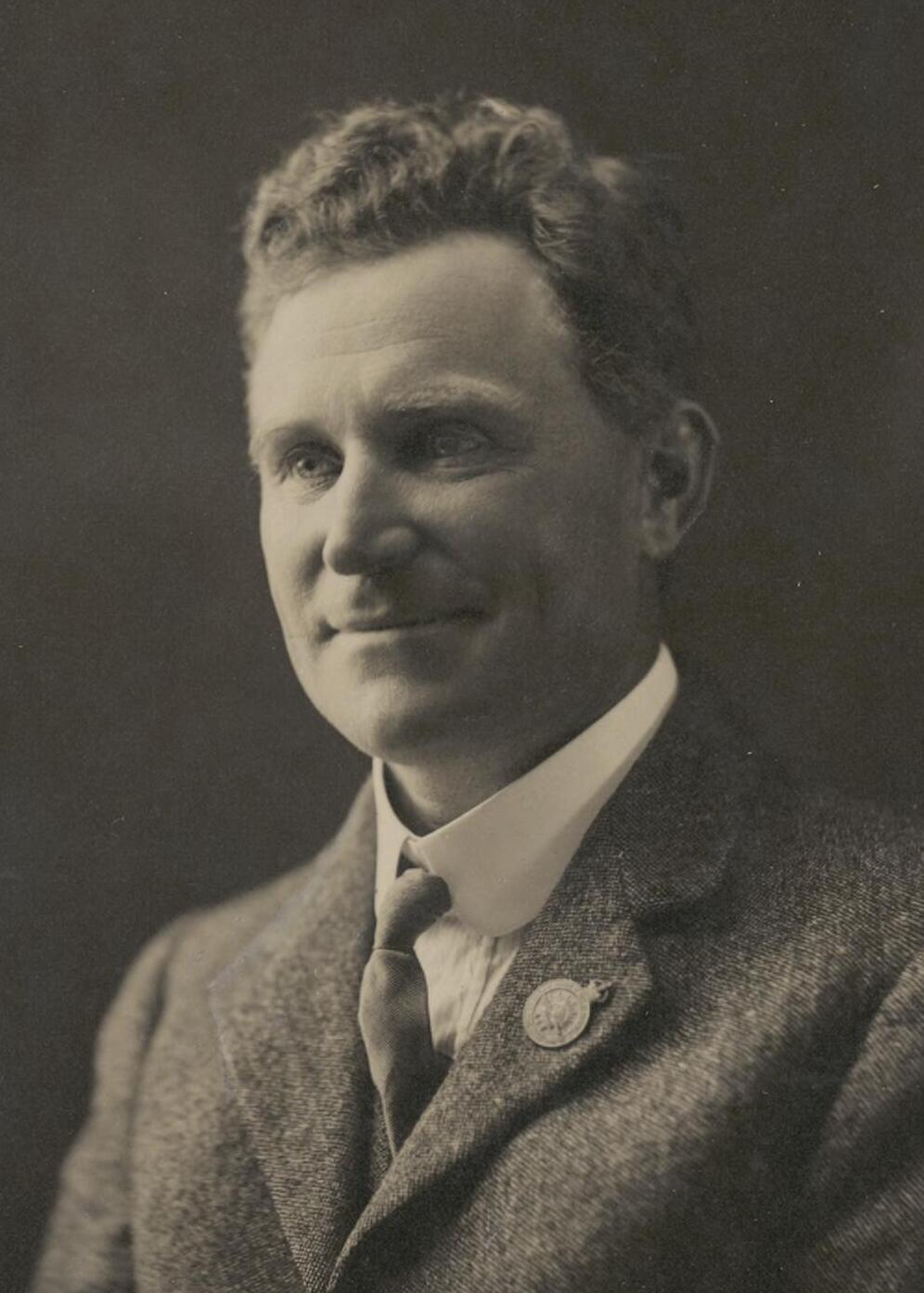
Dr Earle Page was the Country Party's first whip and second leader. He served as Treasurer and, briefly, Prime Minister.

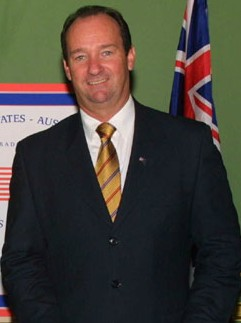
Mark Vaile, whip 1996–97, was later leader of the National Party and Deputy Prime Minister.

Whip	Date	Deputy Whip	Date	Leader
Earle Page (Note: Later Leader of the Country Party (1922–39) and Prime Minister of Australia (1939).) (Cowper)	25 February 1920			William McWilliams
William Gibson (Corangamite)	5 April 1921			Earle Page
Percy Stewart (Wimmera)	16 January 1923			Earle Page
John Prowse (Note: Later Later Deputy Speaker of the House of Representatives.) (Forrest)	9 February 1923			Earle Page
James Hunter (Maranoa)	8 August 1924			Earle Page
Victor Thompson (New England)	14 November 1934			Earle Page
Horace Nock (Riverina)	30 November 1937			Earle Page
Horace Nock (Riverina)	30 November 1937			Archie Cameron
Bernard Corser (Wide Bay)	16 April 1940			Archie Cameron
Bernard Corser (Wide Bay)	16 April 1940			Arthur Fadden
Charles Davidson (Dawson)	21 February 1950			Arthur Fadden
Winton Turnbull (Mallee)	14 February 1956			Arthur Fadden
Winton Turnbull (Mallee)	14 February 1956			John McEwen
Winton Turnbull (Mallee)	14 February 1956			Doug Anthony
John England (Calare)	10 October 1972			Doug Anthony
James Corbett (Maranoa)	c. 17 February 1976	Peter Fisher (Mallee)	c. 17 February 1976	Doug Anthony
Peter Fisher (Mallee)	28 August 1980			Doug Anthony
Noel Hicks (Riverina, Riverina-Darling)	21 April 1983			Doug Anthony
Noel Hicks (Riverina, Riverina-Darling)	21 April 1983			Ian Sinclair
Noel Hicks (Riverina, Riverina-Darling)	21 April 1983	Garry Nehl (Cowper)	12 May 1989	Charles Blunt
Noel Hicks (Riverina, Riverina-Darling)	21 April 1983	Garry Nehl (Cowper)	12 May 1989	Tim Fischer
Chief Whip	Date	Whip	Date	Leader
Noel Hicks (Riverina)	21 April 1983	Garry Nehl (Cowper)	12 May 1989	Tim Fischer
Noel Hicks (Riverina)	21 April 1983	Mark Vaile (Note: Later Leader of the Country Party and Deputy Prime Minister (2005–07)) (Lyne)	29 April 1996	Tim Fischer
Noel Hicks (Riverina)	21 April 1983	Larry Anthony (Richmond)	21 October 1997	Tim Fischer
John Forrest (Mallee)	10 November 1998	Paul Neville (Hinkler)	23 October 1998	Tim Fischer
John Forrest (Mallee)	10 November 1998	Paul Neville (Hinkler)	23 October 1998	John Anderson
John Forrest (Mallee)	10 November 1998	Paul Neville (Hinkler)	23 October 1998	Mark Vaile
Kay Hull (Riverina)	14 August 2006	Paul Neville (Hinkler)	23 October 1998	Mark Vaile
Kay Hull (Riverina)	14 August 2006	Paul Neville (Hinkler)	23 October 1998	Warren Truss
Mark Coulton (Parkes)	14 September 2010	Paul Neville (Hinkler)	23 October 1998	Warren Truss
Mark Coulton (Parkes)	14 September 2010	George Christensen (Dawson)	17 October 2013	Warren Truss
Mark Coulton (Parkes)	14 September 2010	George Christensen (Dawson)	17 October 2013	Barnaby Joyce
George Christensen (Dawson)	30 August 2016	Michelle Landry (Capricornia)	30 August 2016	Barnaby Joyce
Damian Drum (Murray)	1 March 2017	Michelle Landry (Capricornia)	30 August 2016	Barnaby Joyce
Michelle Landry (Capricornia)	8 February 2018	Kevin Hogan (Page)	8 February 2018	Barnaby Joyce
Michelle Landry (Capricornia)	8 February 2018	Kevin Hogan (Page)	8 February 2018	Michael McCormack
Michelle Landry (Capricornia)	8 February 2018	Llew O'Brien (Wide Bay)	26 March 2018	Michael McCormack
Damian Drum (Murray)	10 September 2018	Ken O'Dowd (Murray)	10 September 2018	Michael McCormack
Mark Coulton (Parkes)	26 July 2022	Sam Birrell (Nicholls)	26 July 2022	David Littleproud
Chief Whip	Date	Deputy Whip	Date	Leader
Michelle Landry (Capricornia)	30 May 2025	David Batt (Hinkler)	30 May 2025	David Littleproud
Michelle Landry (Capricornia)	30 May 2025	David Batt (Hinkler)	30 May 2025	Matt Canavan

== Defunct parties ==
=== Free Trade/Anti-Socialist Party ===
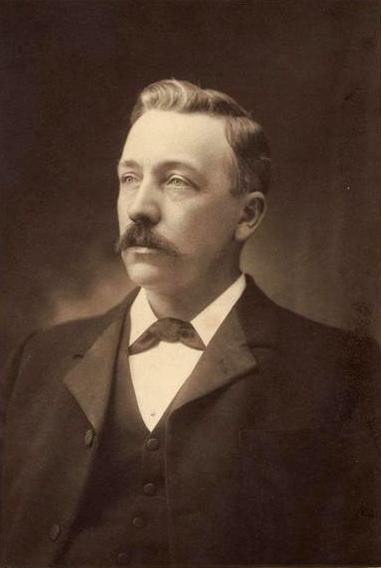
Austin Chapman (Protectionist) was Australia's first government whip, and later served under Alfred Deakin in various capacities.

Whip	Date	Leader
Sydney Smith (Macquarie)	10 May 1901	George Reid
William Wilks (Dalley)	3 September 1904 (Note: Identically worded news stories appeared in newspapers in July 1905 following the fall of the Reid government that suggested Sydney Smith would resume the position. Wilks, however, continued as whip. These reports may have been simple misreporting, or the appointment of Smith may have been due to Wilks's intention at that point to nominate for Deputy Speaker; Wilks, in the end, did not put himself forward. Smith may have been a placeholder due to the unlikelihood of Wilks's success given the state of the parties, or Wilks may have been given back the role of whip when he chose not to stand for Deputy Speaker.)	George Reid
Willie Kelly (Wentworth)	20 February 1907	George Reid
Willie Kelly (Wentworth)	20 February 1907	Joseph Cook

=== Protectionist Party ===
Whip	Date	Leader
Austin Chapman (Eden-Monaro)	17 May 1901	Edmund Barton
Francis Clarke (Cowper)	29 September 1903	Alfred Deakin
James Hume Cook (Bourke)	1 March 1904	Alfred Deakin

=== Commonwealth Liberal Party ===
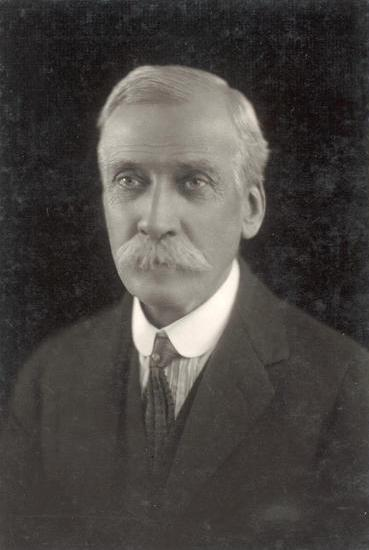
Elliot Johnson (Liberal) was the first whip later elected Speaker of the House of Representatives.

Whip	Date	Whip	Date	Leader
James Hume Cook (Bourke)	21 June 1909			Alfred Deakin
Elliot Johnson (Note: Later Speaker of the Australian House of Representatives) (Lang)	by 1 July 1910			Alfred Deakin
Walter Massy Greene (Richmond)	10 July 1913	John Thomson (Cowper)	10 July 1913	Alfred Deakin
Walter Massy Greene (Richmond)	10 July 1913	John Thomson (Cowper)	10 July 1913	Joseph Cook

=== National Labor ===
Whip	Date	Leader
Reginald Burchell (Fremantle)	14 November 1916	Billy Hughes

=== Nationalist Party of Australia ===
Party Whip	Date	Ministerial Whip	Date	Leader
Walter Massy Greene (Richmond)	13 June 1917 (Note: Massy Greene and Thomson were the whips of the Commonwealth Liberal Party when it entered a coalition with the Prime Minister Hughes's National Labor Party. The coalition followed a schism months earlier when Hughes and his supporters were expelled from the Australian Labor Party, of which Hughes was until then the leader, over conscription of soldiers for the First World War. The Liberal whips acted as de facto government whips during the period between schism and the coalition agreement. Hughes soon called an election in May 1917, at which the two parties formally merged and after which Massy Greene was reported in the press as continuing as Nationalists' whip in the new Parliament, though he and Thomson were both government whips during that Parliament until Massy Greene was made an Honorary Minister in March 1918.)	John Thomson (Cowper)	13 June 1917	Billy Hughes
Ministerial Whip	Date	Government Whip	Date	Leader
John Thomson (Cowper)	c. 26 March 1918	William Story (Boothby)	c. 25 April 1918 (Note: Story acted as a teller for all divisions bar two from 25 April to end of the Parliament and was senior whip in the succeeding Parliament (following Thomson's defeat), therefore he was almost certainly junior whip following Massy Greene's appointment as a minister.)	Billy Hughes
Government Whip	Date	Government Whip	Date	Leader
William Story (Boothby)	3 February 1920	Reginald Burchell (Fremantle)	3 February 1920	Billy Hughes
William Story (Boothby)	3 February 1920	Charles Marr (Parkes)	c. 21 October 1921	Billy Hughes
Charles Marr (Parkes)	9 February 1923			Stanley Bruce
Ministerial Whip	Date			Leader
Arthur Manning (Macquarie)	6 September 1927			Stanley Bruce
Government Whip	Date			Leader
John Perkins (Eden-Monaro)	27 January 1929			Stanley Bruce
Opposition Whip	Date			Leader
James Bayley (Note: Later Deputy Speaker of the House of Representatives.) (Oxley)	19 November 1929			John Latham

=== United Australia Party ===
Whip	Date	Whip	Date	Leader
James Bayley (Oxley)	8 May 1931	John Price (Boothby)	8 May 1931	Joseph Lyons
Sydney Gardner (Robertson)	10 February 1932			Joseph Lyons
Sydney Gardner (Robertson)	10 February 1932			Robert Menzies
John Price (Boothby)	19 November 1940			Robert Menzies
Allan Guy (Wilmot)	12 February 1941			Robert Menzies
Allan Guy (Wilmot)	12 February 1941			Billy Hughes
Allan Guy (Wilmot)	12 February 1941			Robert Menzies

=== Lang Labor ===
New South Wales Premier and Labor Party Leader Jack Lang's adherents in the Federal Parliament crossed the floor in 1931 to defeat Labor Prime Minister James Scullin, precipitating the 1931 election. Following the election, Lang's NSW Labor Party expelled members who, being loyal to the federal party, had stood against official NSW Labor candidates. The federal party then expelled Lang and his supporters. Lang's four supporters formed their own parliamentary party, with Jack Beasley (who had led the faction within the Labor Party) as leader. The party expanded to nine following the 1934 election and at their pre-sessional meeting in October re-elected Beasley and elected a deputy leader and whip. Following Scullin's resignation as Labor leader in late 1935, the Lang and Official Labor began negotiating a resolution to the split, and the two parties formally adopted an agreement under which the NSW Labor Party was absorbed back into the federal party on 25 February 1936.

Whip	Date	Leader
Joe Gander	24 October 1934	Jack Beasley
