= Parliamentary Entitlements Act 1990 =

Parliament of Australia
- Long title: An Act relating to the provision of benefits to Members of each House of the Parliament
- Citation: No. 29 of 1990
- Territorial extent: States and territories of Australia
- Royal assent: 24 May 1990
- Repealed: 1 January 2018
- Status: Repealed

The Parliamentary Entitlements Act 1990 was an Act of the Parliament of Australia, which governed spending, expenses and entitlements for Australian Members of Parliament (MPs) and Senators.The Parliamentary Entitlements Act was subsumed by the Parliamentary Entitlements Legislation Amendment Act 2017 and is no longer in force.

== Coverage ==
The Parliamentary Entitlements Act entitles MPs and Senators to have their travel expenses paid for. This included travel to and from their divisions and Parliament. The act also extends to any travel providing they are on Parliamentary business. It also entitles them to expenses for overseas visits, such as accommodation, food, clothing and medical coverage however these are limited to a set number each year.

== Publicity ==
Schedule 1.1.2 of the Parliamentary Entitlements Act stated that MPs may provide "Australian flags and printed material related to national symbols, for presentation to constituents". The Act is no longer in force. However, nationhood material including booklets on Australian symbols and flags, CDs and DVDs of the national anthem: "Advance Australia Fair" and official portraits of the then Queen of Australia, Elizabeth II, as well as Prince Philip, Duke of Edinburgh is available through the Constituents Request Program.

In August 2018, a Vice News article reported that Australians were legally entitled to a free portrait of the Queen. However, the facts of the article have been disputed. After the article was published, journalist William Summers claimed the Vice article had overstated its case and there was no "absolutely no law stating that Australians are entitled to any of this stuff". The Department of Finance has advised MPs that "it is expected that there will be an element of formality in the act and/or ceremony attached to the manner in which flags, flag lapel pins and documents are presented and that the presentation is made directly by you to the recipient".

Following the Vice article, MPs received a large increase in requests for portraits of the Queen, some of whom had never received such a request before. Some MPs were critical of the moves with Tim Watts calling it "excellent trolling" and Terri Butler stating she was thinking of sending out pictures of Beyoncé instead. Nonetheless, MPs still supplied the portraits, though some requested that their constituents come to their office in order to save money on postage. Others supplemented the portrait by including Australian Republic Movement literature.
