= Max Chandler-Mather =

Australian politician (born 1992)

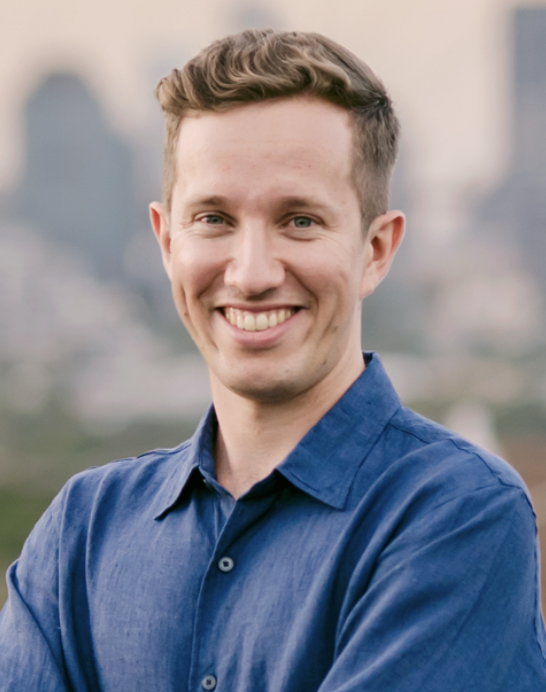

Member of the Australian Parliament for Griffith
- In office 21 May 2022 – 3 May 2025
- Preceded by: Terri Butler
- Succeeded by: Renee Coffey

Personal details
- Born: 15 February 1992 (age 34) South Brisbane, Queensland, Australia
- Party: Greens (since 2016)
- Other political affiliations: Labor (until 2013)
- Domestic partner: Joanna Horton
- Children: 1
- Education: University of Queensland
- Website: www.maxchandlermather.com

Max Chandler-Mather (/-ˈmeɪðər/ -MAY-dhər; born 15 February 1992) is an Australian former politician who served as the MP for the Division of Griffith from 2022 to 2025. He defeated the incumbent Labor Party member Terri Butler in the 2022 federal election before losing re-election to Labor's Renee Coffey in 2025.

A resident of Woolloongabba, Chandler-Mather is a member of the Queensland Greens and worked for the party prior to being elected to parliament.

== Early life and career ==
Chandler-Mather grew up in the suburb of West End. His parents, Tim Mather and Kim Chandler, were members of the Australian Labor Party (ALP). He attended Brisbane State High School.

Chandler-Mather completed a Bachelor of Arts with First Class Honours in History at the University of Queensland. While at university he was a member of the Labor Party, and a member of the Labor Left faction, after being encouraged to join by his parents. Chandler-Mather quit the ALP in 2013, stating in 2022 that he could not remain as a member of the party following Julia Gillard's reestablishment of off-shore detention centres in Nauru. Chandler-Mather worked part-time as a call centre worker at the trade union United Voice, where he said senior organisers attempted to pressure him to rejoin the ALP.

After graduating, Chandler-Mather was a trade union organiser for the National Tertiary Education Union.

Chandler-Mather was not a member of the Greens while employed as Jonathan Sriranganathan's campaign manager for his successful 2016 campaign for Brisbane City Council. Chandler-Mather and Sriranganathan organised their campaign around the left-wing social theory of the right to the city, stating that property developers and banks have turned cities such as Brisbane into 'the new factory', resulting in people believing they do not have power over local communities.

== Political career ==
After Sriranganathan's successful campaign, Chandler-Mather was employed as a full-time campaign strategist for the Queensland Greens, and aimed to take the seat of Griffith. Chandler-Mather contested Griffith at the 2019 Australian federal election and achieved a 6.6% swing, but failed to get elected.

Chandler-Mather re-contested Griffith at the 2022 Australian federal election, and won with a 10.9% swing. Chandler-Mather's 2022 campaign emphasized community engagement, particularly addressing local issues like aircraft noise and housing affordability. According to the Greens' campaign, over 1,000 volunteers participated in door-knocking efforts, knocking 29,000 homes in the Griffith electorate. Following his election to the Australian parliament, Chandler-Mather was appointed as the Greens' spokesperson on housing and homelessness. In this role he advocated for a rent freeze, removing the discount on the capital gains tax, public housing and a government-owned property developer.

After being elected in 2022, Chandler-Mather launched a volunteer-run, weekly, free school breakfast program for three public schools in his electorate. Chandler-Mather donated $32,000 from his parliamentary salary each year to fund the program. At the end of his first term, Chandler-Mather said he had spent $80,000 from his salary to fund the program, with the program reaching 4 schools across the electorate.

In May 2023, the Greens, with other parties, voted to delay a bill to establish the Housing Australia Future Fund, a $10 billion long-term housing fund. In justifying the delay, Chandler-Mather stated that the bill would see the housing crisis worsen, with the $10 billion allocated not to be spent directly on housing, but rather to be "gambled on the stock exchange" and the expected returns used to build homes. Later that year, Chandler-Mather with Greens leader Adam Bandt accepted the government's offer of an extra $3 billion for social and public housing, and voted with Labor, David Pocock and the Jacqui Lambie Network to pass the bill.

In May 2023, Independent MP Helen Haines and Liberal National MP Michelle Landry made complaints to the Speaker regarding personal attacks against him by Labor MPs in parliament, described as "vicious" by Haines. The attacks occurred in the context of dispute between Labor and the Greens about housing policy and rent caps.

On 27 August 2024, Chandler-Mather took to the stage of a rally in Brisbane, protesting legislation passed in the parliament the previous week that put the construction divisions of the CFMEU under administration amid allegations of links to criminal motorcycle organisations. The rally included controversial placards comparing Prime Minister Anthony Albanese to Adolf Hitler. ABC journalist and commentator David Speers criticised Chandler-Mather's decision to appear at the rally, comparing it with Tony Abbott's appearance at a rally against the carbon tax where he stood in front of slogans "Ju-Liar, Bob Brown's bitch" and "Ditch the Witch". Chandler-Mather praised construction workers for rallying, and invited them to become "part of a political movement that takes on developers and the banks, and redistributes that wealth in favour of ordinary, working people." Chandler-Mather said his participation in the rally was to defend due process, and that he was "appalled by allegations of corruption and misogyny" in the union.

Chandler-Mather re-contested Griffith at the 2025 Australian federal election, and received a 2.9% swing against his primary vote. He failed to get re-elected after a collapse in the Liberal Party vote supported a sizeable swing towards the Labor Party, allowing Labor to win back the seat on a 10 point margin. The seat was won by Renee Coffey.

Speaking to Triple J Hack after his election loss, Chandler-Mather stated that he held "no regrets" for his time as an MP and described the workplace in parliament house as "bloody awful and frankly, a lot of the times miserable", specifically pointing to the "yelling and screaming" of opposing MPs during his speeches. In response, Prime Minister Anthony Albanese said Chandler-Mather needed a "a mirror and a reflection on why he’s no longer in parliament”.

In September 2025, Chandler-Mather announced he would join Deepcut News as a regular contributor.

=== Electoral history ===
Australian House of Representatives
Election year	Electorate	Party	Votes	FP%	+/-	2PP%	+/-	Result
2022	Griffith	Greens	36,771	34.59	▲10.94	60.46	▲60.46	First
2025	Griffith	Greens	34,570	31.65	▼2.94	39.43	▼21.03	Second

== Political positions ==
In a 2020 interview with Tom Ballard, Chandler-Mather expressed a desire to turn the Queensland Greens into a mass party that was primarily supported by the working class. He stated he did not identify as a socialist ideologically although his priorities overlapped with what is often perceived as socialism. Chandler-Mather's positions were deemed by the Green Left Weekly to be firmly on the left wing of the Greens, noting his support for a four-day workweek and the public ownership of the electricity and telecommunications industries. Chandler-Mather describes his politics during his time at university as supporting democratic socialism. He has also been described as a "left populist".

Parliament of Australia
Preceded by Terri Butler	Member for Griffith; 2022–2025	Succeeded by Renee Coffey
