= Francis Matthew John Baker =

Australian politician (1903–1939)

Frank Baker
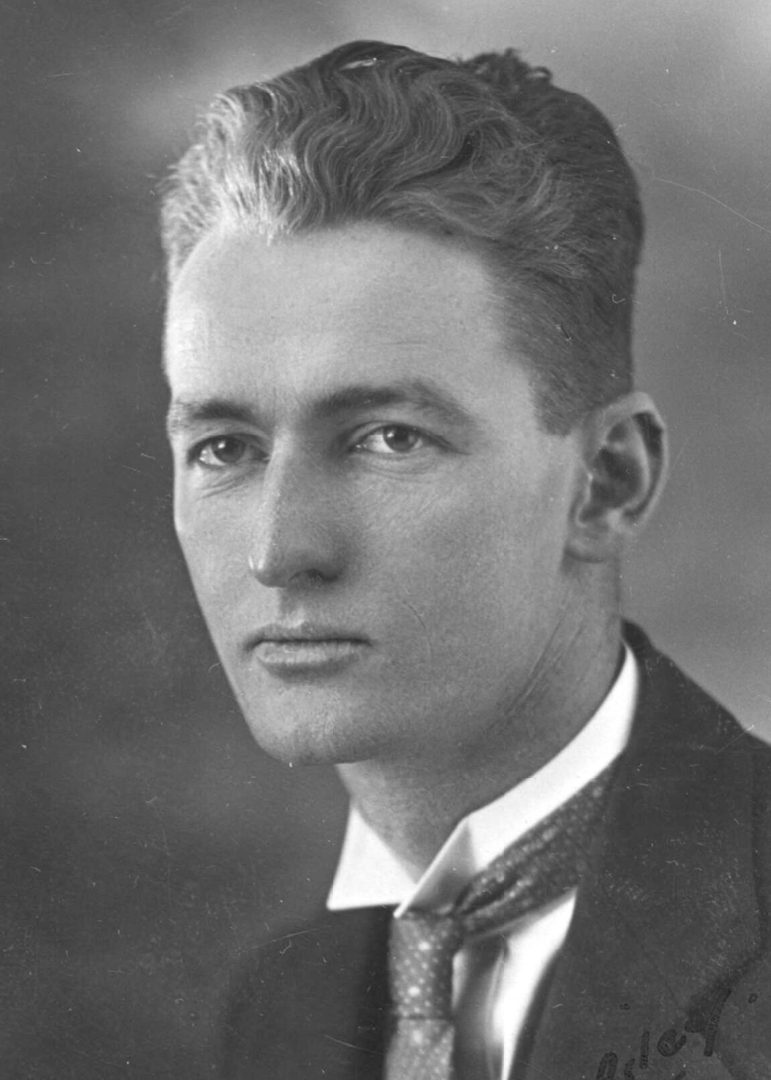

Member of the Australian Parliament for Oxley
- In office 19 December 1931 – 15 September 1934
- Preceded by: James Bayley
- Succeeded by: Division abolished

Member of the Australian Parliament for Griffith
- In office 15 September 1934 – 28 March 1939
- Preceded by: New seat
- Succeeded by: William Conelan

Personal details
- Born: 6 February 1903 Bundaberg, Queensland
- Died: 28 March 1939 (aged 36)
- Party: Australian Labor Party

Francis Matthew John Baker (6 February 1903 – 28 March 1939) was an Australian politician and vice-president of the State Service Union.

Baker was born in Bundaberg, Queensland. A member of the Federal Labor Party, he unsuccessfully ran for office for the Queensland seat of Oxley in the 1928 federal election, being beaten by James Bayley of the Nationalist Party. He made a second run for the seat in 1929, and narrowly lost to Bayley.

In the 1931 election he contested Oxley for a third time, this time successfully. He was one of only two Labor challengers to defeat a Coalition incumbent in an election that saw the two Labor factions cut down to 18 seats between them. Following the abolition of Oxley, Baker successfully contested Griffith, essentially a reconfigured version of Oxley, in 1934 and won. He was reelected in 1937. He remained in parliament until 1939 when he was killed in a motor accident. His death resulted in the 1939 Griffith by-election.

In 1936, Baker led a proposal for Australian parliamentary proceedings to be broadcast on radio.

Following his death, the Australian prime minister, Joseph Lyons (who himself died a little over a week later), commented that "had he lived, I am sure he would have advanced to an important place in his party." Baker studied law while a member of parliament and had almost completed his course when he died.

Baker's father, Francis (Frank) Patrick Baker, was elected to the seat of Maranoa in 1940. This is the only case in which a father was elected to the Australian federal parliament after his son.

Baker is buried in South Brisbane Cemetery.

Parliament of Australia
Preceded by James Bayley	Member for Oxley; 1931–1934	Division abolished
New division	Member for Griffith; 1934–1939	Succeeded by William Conelan
