= Arthur Chresby =

Australian politician

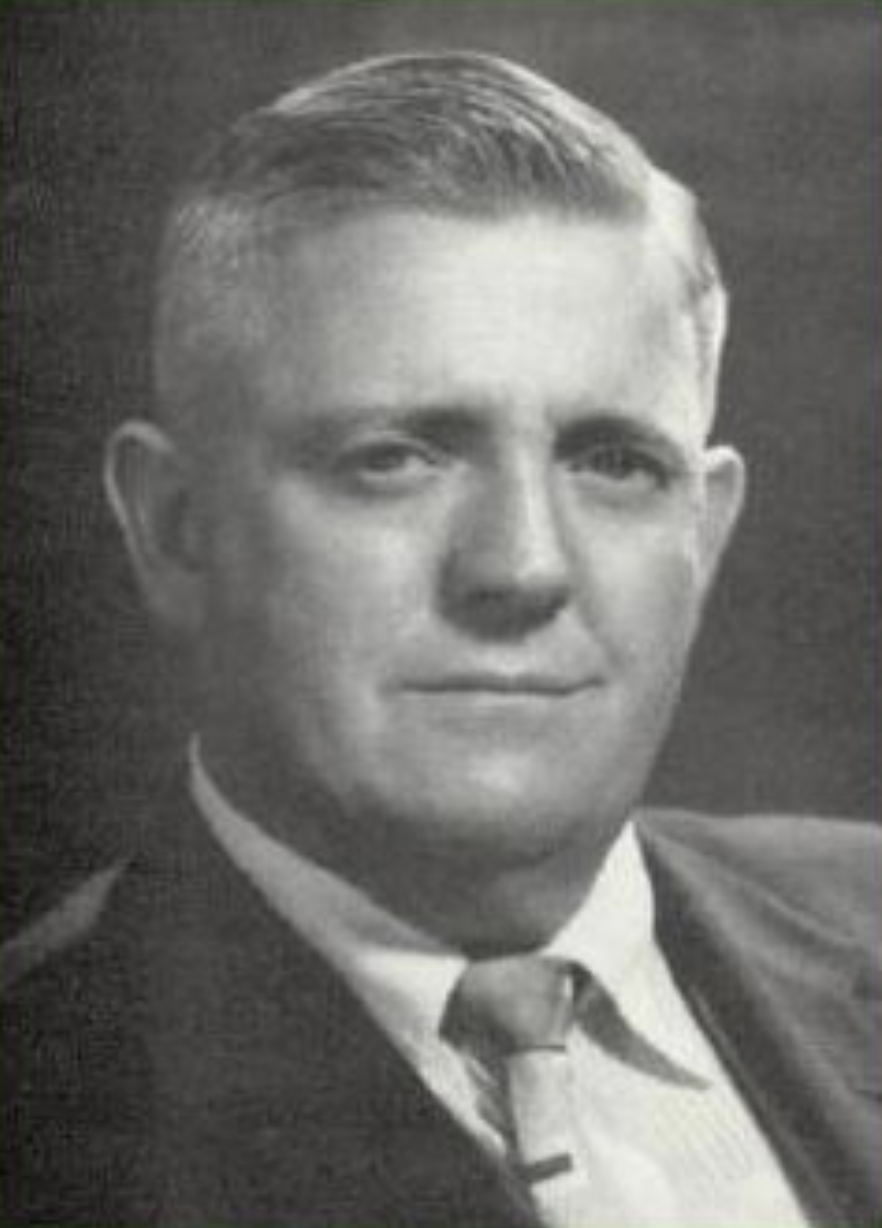

Member of the Australian Parliament for Griffith
- In office 22 November 1958 – 9 December 1961
- Preceded by: Wilfred Coutts
- Succeeded by: Wilfred Coutts

Personal details
- Born: 6 February 1908 Wickham, New South Wales, Australia
- Died: 25 August 1985 (aged 77)
- Party: Liberal Party of Australia
- Occupation: Public relations consultant

Arthur Albert Chresby (6 February 1908 – 25 August 1985) was an Australian politician. Born in New South Wales, he attended state schools before becoming a journalist, then a car salesman, and finally a public relations consultant. In 1958, he was elected to the Australian House of Representatives as the Liberal member for the Queensland seat of Griffith, having previously contested the seat as a Services Party candidate. He was defeated in 1961. He had some association with the Australian League of Rights and its leader Eric Butler. He went on to write an information booklet 'Your Will Be Done' that was aimed at informing Australians of their electoral rights and obligations in an attempt to maintain the rights of everyday Australians. He maintained that the government and public representatives had as their sole purpose and duty is only to act upon the will of the Australian people, not political factions. He died in 1985.

Parliament of Australia
Preceded by Wilfred Coutts	Member for Griffith; 1958–1961	Succeeded by Wilfred Coutts
