= Doug Berry (politician) =

Australian politician (1907–1957)

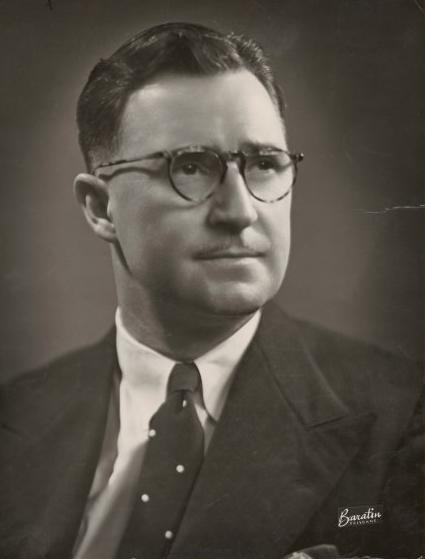

Member of the Australian Parliament for Griffith
- In office 10 December 1949 – 29 May 1954
- Preceded by: William Conelan
- Succeeded by: Wilfred Coutts

Personal details
- Born: 3 May 1907 Esk, Queensland
- Died: 17 April 1957 (aged 49)
- Party: Liberal Party of Australia
- Occupation: Butcher

Douglas Reginald Berry (3 May 1907 – 17 April 1957) was an Australian politician. Born in Esk, Queensland, he was educated at state schools and at Ipswich Technical College. He became a butcher, and eventually owned a chain of butcher's shops. In 1949, he was elected to the Australian House of Representatives as the Liberal member for Griffith, defeating Labor MP William Conelan. He held the seat until his defeat in 1954. Berry died in 1957.

Parliament of Australia
| Preceded by William Conelan | Member for Griffith; 1949–1954 | Succeeded by Wilfred Coutts |
