= 1939 Griffith by-election =

- 20 May 1939
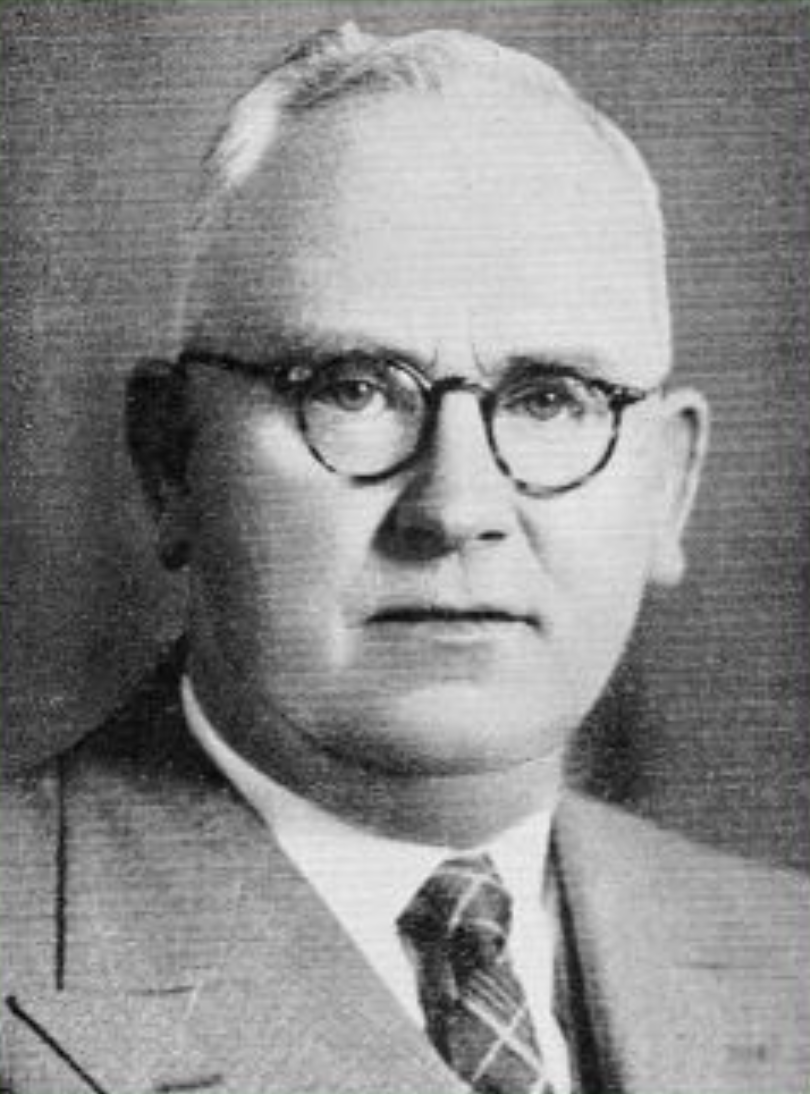
	First party	Second party	Third party
		UAP	PLP
Candidate	William Conelan	Peter McCowan	Everett Graham
Party	Labor	United Australia	Protestant Labour
Popular vote	22,967	17,168	15,437
Percentage	41.3%	30.9	27.8%
Swing	▼7.0pp	▼10.3pp	▲27.8pp
TPP	50.0%	50.0%
TPP swing	▼0.3pp	▲0.3pp
MP before election
Frank Baker
Labor
Elected MP
William Conelan
Labor

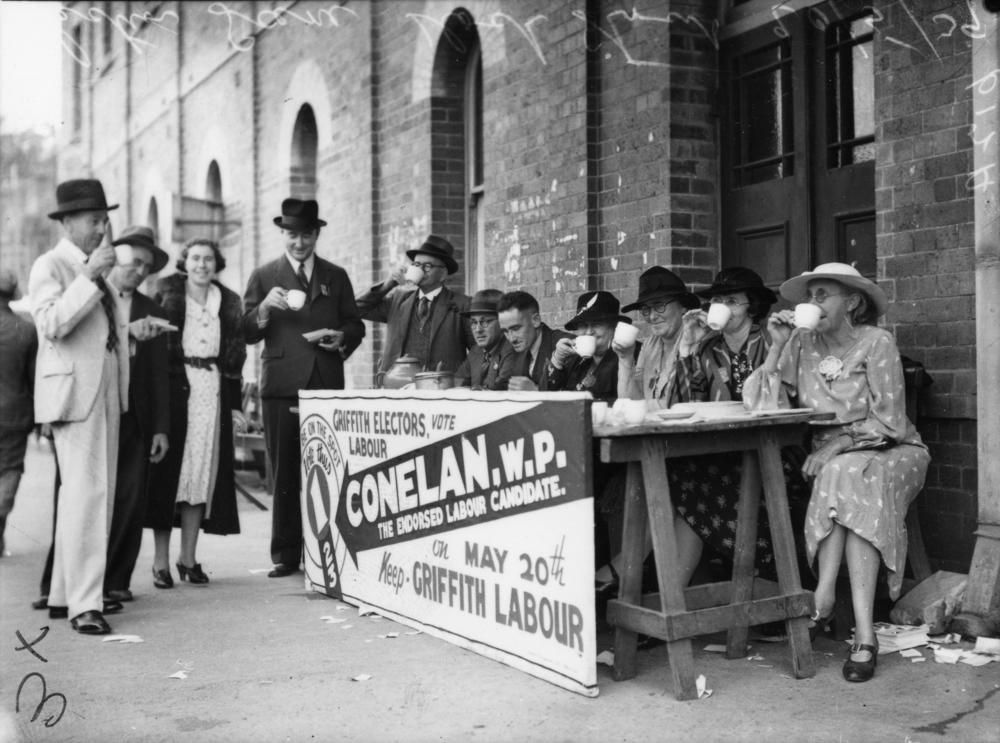
Conelan table and supporters for the election

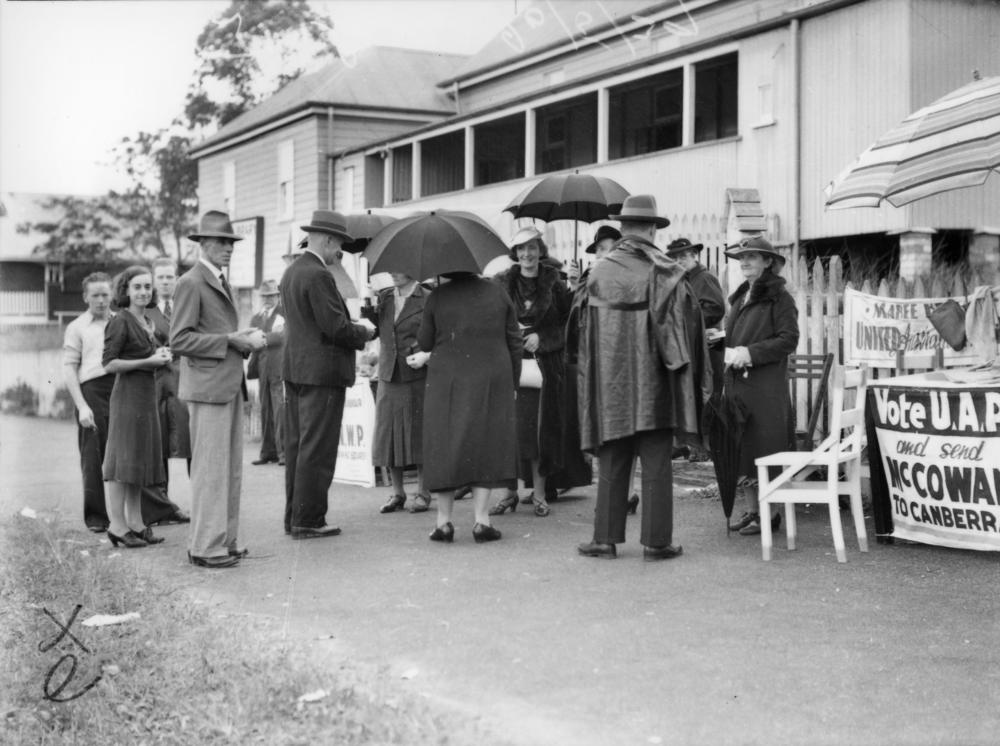
McCowan table and supporters for the election

A by-election was held for the Australian House of Representatives seat of Griffith on 20 May 1939. This was triggered by the death of Labor Party MP Frank Baker.

The election was won by Labor candidate William Conelan by eight votes.

Immediately after Baker's death, there was some speculation that Queensland premier, William Forgan Smith would contest the by-election.

== Results ==
Griffith by-election, 1939
Party	Candidate	Votes	%	±%
Labor	William Conelan	22,967	41.3	−7.0
United Australia	Peter McCowan	17,168	30.9	−10.3
Protestant Labour	Everett Graham	15,437	27.8	+27.8
Total formal votes		55,572	98.2	
Informal votes		1,025	1.8	
Turnout		56,597	91.6	−5.8
Two-party-preferred result
Labor	William Conelan	27,790	50.0	−0.3
United Australia	Peter McCowan	27,782	50.0	+0.3
Labor hold		Swing	−0.3	

== See also ==
- List of Australian federal by-elections
