= Division of Griffith =

Australian federal electoral division

Coordinates: 27.486°S 153.062°E

Griffith Australian House of Representatives Division
- Interactive map of boundaries since the 2019 federal election
- Created: 1934
- MP: Renee Coffey
- Party: Labor
- Namesake: Sir Samuel Griffith
- Electors: 123,939 (2025)
- Area: 57 km^{2} (22.0 sq mi)
- Demographic: Inner metropolitan
Electorates around Griffith:
Brisbane	Brisbane	Lilley
Ryan	Griffith	Bonner
Moreton	Bonner	Bonner

The Division of Griffith is an Australian electoral division in the state of Queensland. It covers the inner southern suburbs of Brisbane.

Since 2025 its MP has been Renee Coffey of the Labor Party. From 1998 to 2013, the seat was held by Kevin Rudd, who served twice as Prime Minister of Australia (2007–2010, 2013).

== History ==
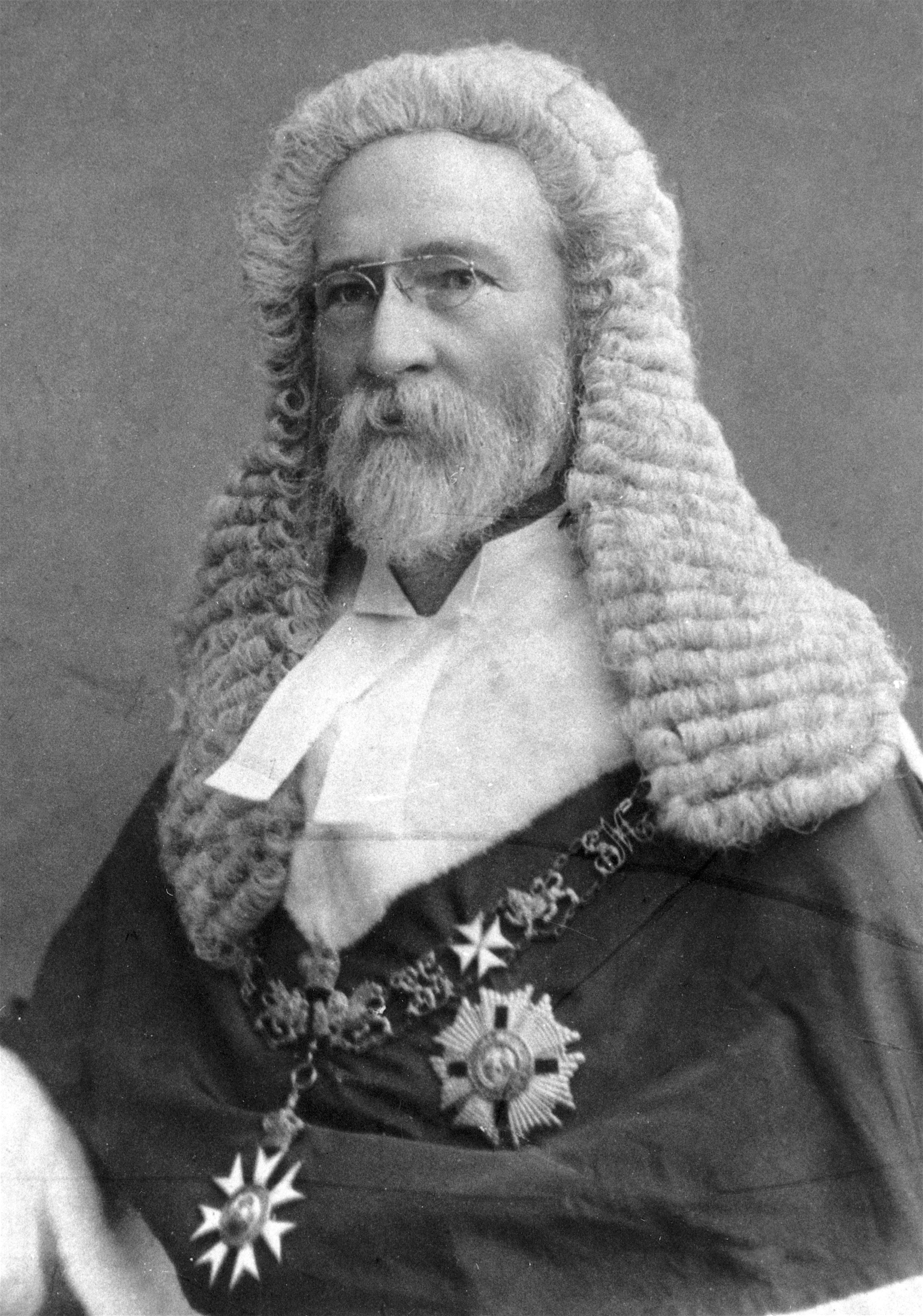
Sir Samuel Griffith, the division's namesake

The division is named after Sir Samuel Griffith, former politician and a principal author of the Constitution of Australia.

Griffith was created in 1934, replacing the seat of Oxley which had been established in 1900.

Historically, the seat has been highly marginal and has alternated between the Labor Party and Liberal Party. The 1939 Griffith by-election was nearly the sight of an upset, with the UAP/Country coalition government coming within five votes of taking the seat from the incumbent opposition Labor party. Apart from 1920, the rare feat of a Government winning a seat from the Opposition in a by-election would only be achieved in 2023 when Labor won the 2023 Aston by-election.

Close contests ensued, with the seat being decided by just 118 votes in 1954, 21 votes in 1958, and 182 votes in 1972. In 1977, the seat was won by future Hawke-Keating government minister Ben Humphreys under whose nearly 20-year tenure the seat became much safer for Labor. However, on Humphreys' retirement and as Labor lost government in 1996, future Prime Minister Kevin Rudd failed to win the seat to the Liberal Party's Graeme McDougall by 1.5%. Rudd would later emerge victorious in 1998, winning the seat with 52.4% of the two-candidate-preferred vote. Rudd steadily increased his margin at each successive election until 2010, reaching a peak of 62.3% of the vote in 2007 as he led Labor to government. Rudd suffered an under average two-party-preferred swing in 2010 having been deposed as Prime Minister two months earlier.

Rudd suffered a further swing against him in 2013 with the seat becoming marginal once more. He retired following the election and bequeathed a 3% margin to his successor Terri Butler who narrowly retained the seat at the ensuing 2014 Griffith by-election with a 1.8% margin, 1.6% in 2016, and 2.9% in 2019 – one of the few swings to Labor in Queensland. However, during Butler's tenure, Labor's primary vote saw itself become cannibalized to its left flank, with the Greens winning five booths on primary votes at the 2019 federal election with a further four booths in which the party came at a close second. The Greens also achieved their strongest favourable swing in 2019 within this seat (at 6.67%). Similarly in 2020, the Greens won the state seat of South Brisbane from Labor, which overlaps with part of the electorate. Subsequently Greens candidate Max Chandler-Mather winning the seat in the 2022 federal election, with 60.5% of the two-party preferred vote and 34.6% of the first preference vote, Labor being pushed into third place.

Max Chandler-Mather re-contested Griffith at the 2025 Australian federal election, but failed to get re-elected after a sizeable swing towards the Labor Party where the seat was won by Renee Coffey.

== Boundaries ==
Since 1984, federal electoral division boundaries in Australia have been determined at redistributions by a redistribution committee administered by the Australian Electoral Commission. Redistributions occur for the boundaries of divisions in a particular state, and they occur every seven years, or sooner if a state's representation entitlement changes or when divisions of a state are malapportioned.

Griffith covers the inner southern Brisbane suburbs of Balmoral, Bulimba, Camp Hill, Carina Heights, Coorparoo, Dutton Park, East Brisbane, Greenslopes, Highgate Hill, Hawthorne, Kangaroo Point, Morningside, Norman Park, Seven Hills, South Brisbane, Stones Corner, West End and Woolloongabba, as well as parts of Annerley, Cannon Hill, Carina, Holland Park, Holland Park West, Mount Gravatt East, Murarrie, and Tarragindi.

== Members ==
Image	Member	Party	Term	Notes
	Francis Baker (1903–1939)	Labor	15 September 1934 – 28 March 1939	Previously held the Division of Oxley. Died in office
	William Conelan (1895–1983)	Labor	20 May 1939 – 10 December 1949	Served as Chief Government Whip in the House under Curtin. Lost seat
	Doug Berry (1907–1957)	Liberal	10 December 1949 – 29 May 1954	Lost seat
	Wilfred Coutts (1908–1997)	Labor	29 May 1954 – 22 November 1958	Lost seat
	Arthur Chresby (1908–1985)	Liberal	22 November 1958 – 9 December 1961	Lost seat
	Wilfred Coutts (1908–1997)	Labor	9 December 1961 – 26 November 1966	Lost seat
	Don Cameron (1940–)	Liberal	26 November 1966 – 10 December 1977	Transferred to the Division of Fadden
	Ben Humphreys (1934–2019)	Labor	10 December 1977 – 29 January 1996	Served as Chief Government Whip in the House under Hawke. Served as minister under Hawke and Keating. Retired
	Graeme McDougall (1946–)	Liberal	2 March 1996 – 3 October 1998	Lost seat
	Kevin Rudd (1957–)	Labor	3 October 1998 – 22 November 2013	Served as Opposition Leader from 2006 to 2007. Served as Prime Minister from 2007 to 2010, and in 2013. Served as minister under Gillard. Resigned to retire from politics
	Terri Butler (1977–)	Labor	8 February 2014 – 21 May 2022	Lost seat
	Max Chandler-Mather (1992–)	Greens	21 May 2022 – 3 May 2025	Lost seat
	Renee Coffey (1982–)	Labor	3 May 2025 – present	Incumbent

== Election results ==
2025 Australian federal election: Griffith
Party	Candidate	Votes	%	±%
Labor	Renee Coffey	37,686	34.51	+5.57
Greens	Max Chandler-Mather	34,570	31.65	−2.94
Liberal National	Anthony Bishop	29,025	26.58	−4.16
One Nation	Lindsay Bell	2,684	2.46	−0.84
People First	Dion Hunt	2,528	2.31	+2.31
Trumpet of Patriots	Aaron Hayes	1,659	1.52	+1.52
Family First	Andrea Campbell	1,060	0.97	+0.97
Total formal votes		109,212	97.80	−0.20
Informal votes		2,454	2.20	+0.20
Turnout		111,666	90.11	+0.66
Notional two-party-preferred count
Labor	Renee Coffey	72,015	65.94	+4.87
Liberal National	Anthony Bishop	37,197	34.06	−4.87
Two-candidate-preferred result
Labor	Renee Coffey	66,154	60.57	+60.57
Greens	Max Chandler-Mather	43,058	39.43	−21.03
Labor gain from Greens				
