= Renee Coffey =

Australian politician

Renee Coffey MP
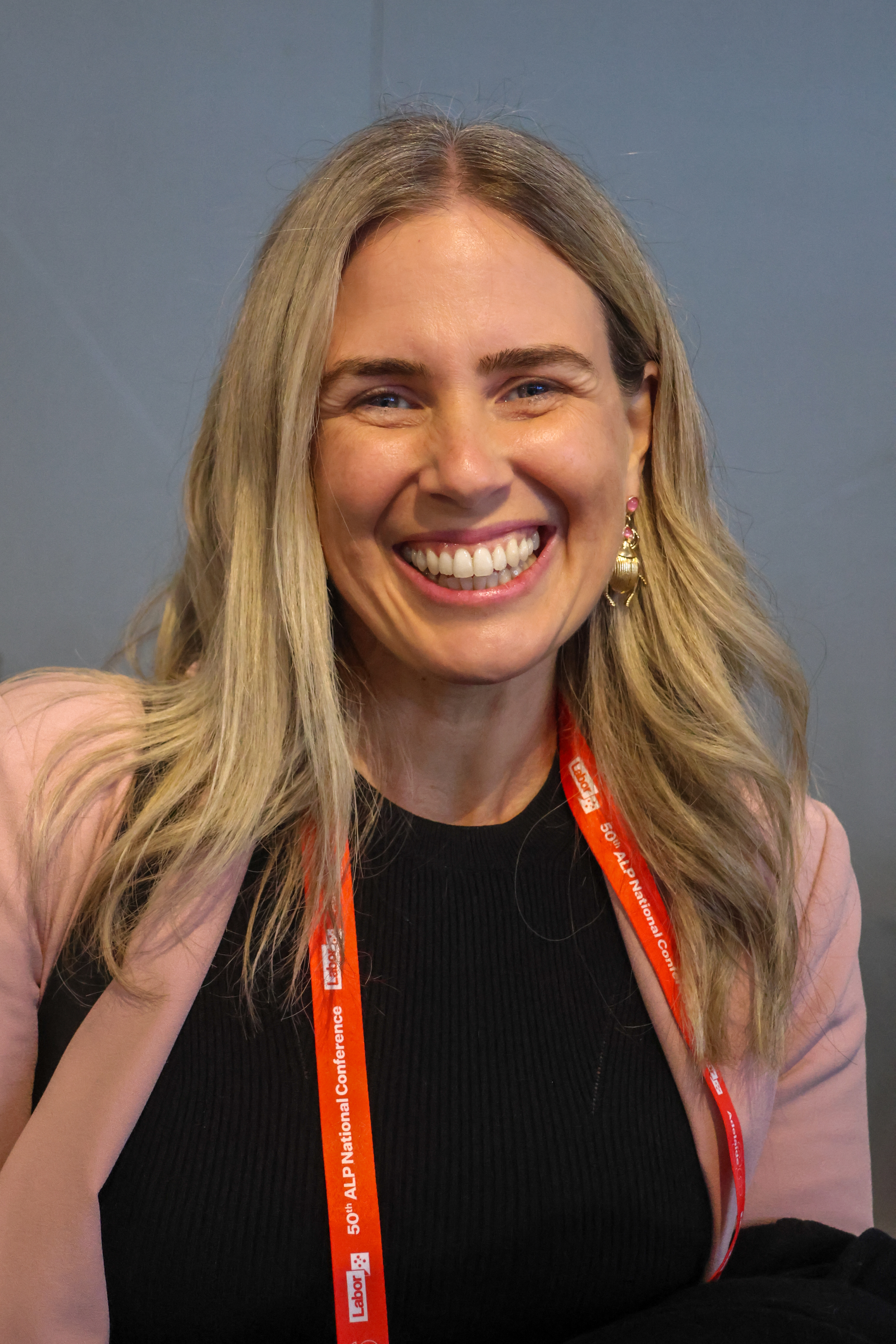
- Coffey in 2026

Member of the Australian Parliament for Griffith
- Incumbent
- Assumed office 3 May 2025
- Preceded by: Max Chandler-Mather

Personal details
- Born: 21 April 1982 (age 44) South Brisbane, Queensland, Australia
- Party: Labor
- Spouse: Jason McKenzie
- Children: 2 sons, 2 step-daughters
- Education: University of Queensland (BA, Hons I); University of South Australia (Grad Dip Ed); University of New South Wales (Grad Cert in Social Impact); Stanford University (Executive Program for Nonprofit Leaders)
- Awards: Centenary Medal (2001)
- Website: www.reneecoffey.com

Renee Coffey (born 21 April 1982) is an Australian Labor Party politician. She is a member of the Australian Parliament for the Division of Griffith after winning the seat in the 2025 Australian federal election. Coffey was born in South Brisbane, raised in Hawthorne and now lives in Norman Park.

== Early life and education ==
Renee Coffey was born at the Mater Hospital in Brisbane in April 1982 and grew up in the suburb of Hawthorne. During her high school years, she founded "Young Australians for Anti-Racism and Reconciliation". In 1999, she graduated from Cannon Hill Anglican College. Her 2006 Bachelor of Arts Honours thesis discussed the frontier violence in Gin Gin, focusing on the 1850 massacre at Paddy Island and the myths resulting.

== Career ==
Before entering politics, Coffey served as the CEO of Australian Kookaburra Kids Foundation which provides mental health services to young people affected by family mental illness. During this time, the foundation launched the Regenerate program, which combines environmental education with mental health literacy for young people impacted by family mental illness. Prior to Kookaburra Kids, Coffey served as the Deputy CEO of the Australian Indigenous Education Foundation (AIEF) for more than a decade, where she worked to expand access to educational scholarships for Indigenous students.

Coffey is a member of the Queensland Labor Unity faction, and caucuses with Labor Left federally

== Awards and recognition ==
Coffey has been recognised for her advocacy work:

- Queensland Finalist in the Young Australian of the Year Awards (2000)
- Non-Indigenous Youth Representative, Corroboree 2000
- Australian Centenary Medal (2001)
- Delegate, Australia 2020 Summit
- Nominated for Pride of Australia Medal (2015) for her community and advocacy work.
- Recipient of the Stanford Australia Association scholarship for the Executive Program for Non-Profit Leaders, Stanford University.

== Personal life ==
In 2014, Coffey was diagnosed with multiple sclerosis.

In June 2024, she married Jason McKenzie. She has two sons and two step-daughters.

Parliament of Australia
Preceded by Max Chandler-Mather	Member for Griffith; 2025–present	Incumbent
