= Graeme McDougall =

Australian politician

Member of the Australian Parliament for Griffith
- In office 2 March 1996 – 3 October 1998
- Preceded by: Ben Humphreys
- Succeeded by: Kevin Rudd

Brisbane City Councillor for Chandler Ward Carina Ward (1988-1994)
- In office 12 March 1988 – 2 March 1996
- Succeeded by: Michael Caltabiano

Personal details
- Born: 21 November 1946 (age 79) New South Wales
- Party: Liberal
- Occupation: Small businessman

Graeme Robert McDougall (born 21 November 1946) is an Australian former politician and businessman. He was a member of the House of Representatives from 1996 to 1998, representing the Queensland seat of Griffith for the Liberal Party. He also served on Brisbane City Council.

== Early life ==
McDougall was born on 21 November 1946 in Taree, New South Wales. He holds an associate diploma in business management from East Sydney Technical College. Prior to entering politics he was a senior manager in the plastics industry and later ran a hardware store.

== Politics ==
McDougall served on the Brisbane City Council from 1988 to 1996. He was chairman of the organising committee for the 1988 FINA World Masters Championships which Brisbane hosted.

At the 1993 federal election, McDougall served as chair of the Liberal Party's campaign committee in Queensland. He was elected to the House of Representatives at the 1996 election, winning the seat of Griffith for the Liberals. Although the retiring Labor MP, Ben Humphreys, had held it without serious difficulty since 1977, the recent redistribution had cut Labor's majority almost in half, to a somewhat marginal four percent. Additionally, Labor was very unpopular in Queensland. McDougall defeated Labor candidate Kevin Rudd on the eighth count, largely due to getting a large flow of National preferences on the seventh count. Labor was cut down to only two seats in the state, its worst showing there since 1975. Rudd, who would later go on to become leader of the Australian Labor Party and eventually prime minister, successfully re-contested Griffith in the 1998 election.

Parliament of Australia
Preceded by Ben Humphreys	Member for Griffith; 1996–1998	Succeeded by Kevin Rudd
