= Ben Humphreys =

Australian politician (1934–2019)

The Honourable Ben Humphreys AM

Minister for Veterans' Affairs
- In office 24 July 1987 – 24 March 1993
- Prime Minister: Bob Hawke; Paul Keating
- Preceded by: Arthur Gietzelt
- Succeeded by: John Faulkner

Member of the Australian Parliament for Griffith
- In office 10 December 1977 – 29 January 1996
- Preceded by: Don Cameron
- Succeeded by: Graeme McDougall

Personal details
- Born: Benjamin Charles Humphreys; 17 August 1934 Brisbane, Queensland, Australia
- Died: 17 November 2019 (aged 85) Brisbane, Queensland, Australia
- Party: Labor
- Occupation: Mechanic

Benjamin Charles Humphreys AM (17 August 1934 – 17 November 2019) was an Australian politician. He was a member of the Australian Labor Party (ALP) and served in the House of Representatives from 1977 to 1996, representing the Division of Griffith in Queensland. He was Minister for Veterans' Affairs in the Hawke and Keating Governments from 1987 to 1993.

== Early life ==
Humphreys was born in Brisbane and worked as a mechanic before entering politics.

== Politics ==
Humphreys was elected to federal parliament at the 1977 federal election.

Humphreys served a six-year term as Minister for Veterans' Affairs in the ministries of Bob Hawke and Paul Keating. In May 1992, that ministry and Humphreys along with it was promoted to Cabinet, and Humphreys also took over the duties of Minister assisting the Prime Minister for Northern Australia from Senator Bob Collins. Humphreys' elevation to Cabinet was because he was a Queenslander and there was a push to get at least one other Queenslander to Cabinet as Queensland in Cabinet prior to the May 1992 reshuffle was underrepresented. Despite this promotion to Cabinet, Humphreys was not reselected for a place in the ministry by the ALP caucus after the ALP's 1993 election victory ten months later.

After 18 years in parliament, Humphreys intended to leave politics in 1994 but delayed his retirement for a year to ensure that his preferred successor was ready to stand for preselection. His successor, Kevin Rudd, who would later to become leader of the ALP and Prime Minister of Australia, lost Griffith to Liberal candidate Graeme McDougall in 1996 but exacted revenge by winning the seat in 1998.

Humphreys would perhaps have retired from Parliament in 1995 after Kevin Rudd's preselection in Griffith but decided against it as that would have meant an unwanted by-election not long after the ALP's loss of the seat of Canberra in a by-election earlier that year.

== Later life ==
Humphreys was known for his close contact with Australia's South Pacific neighbours, and in August 2001 he was part of a Commonwealth Observer Group sent to oversee the 2001 election in Fiji. He served on the board of the Australian Stockman's Hall of Fame.

Humphreys died on 17 November 2019, aged 85.

== Honours ==
- 26 January 2000: Member of the Order of Australia for service to the Federal Parliament, particularly in the area of veterans' affairs.
- 1 January 2001: Centenary Medal for distinguished service to the Commonwealth Parliament and politics

Political offices
| Preceded by Arthur Gietzelt | Minister for Veterans' Affairs; 1987–1993 | Succeeded by John Faulkner |
| Preceded by Bob Collins | Minister assisting the Prime Minister for Northern Australia; 1992–1993 | Abolished |
Parliament of Australia
| Preceded by Don Cameron | Member for Griffith; 1977–1996 | Succeeded by Graeme McDougall |
