= William Conelan =

Australian politician

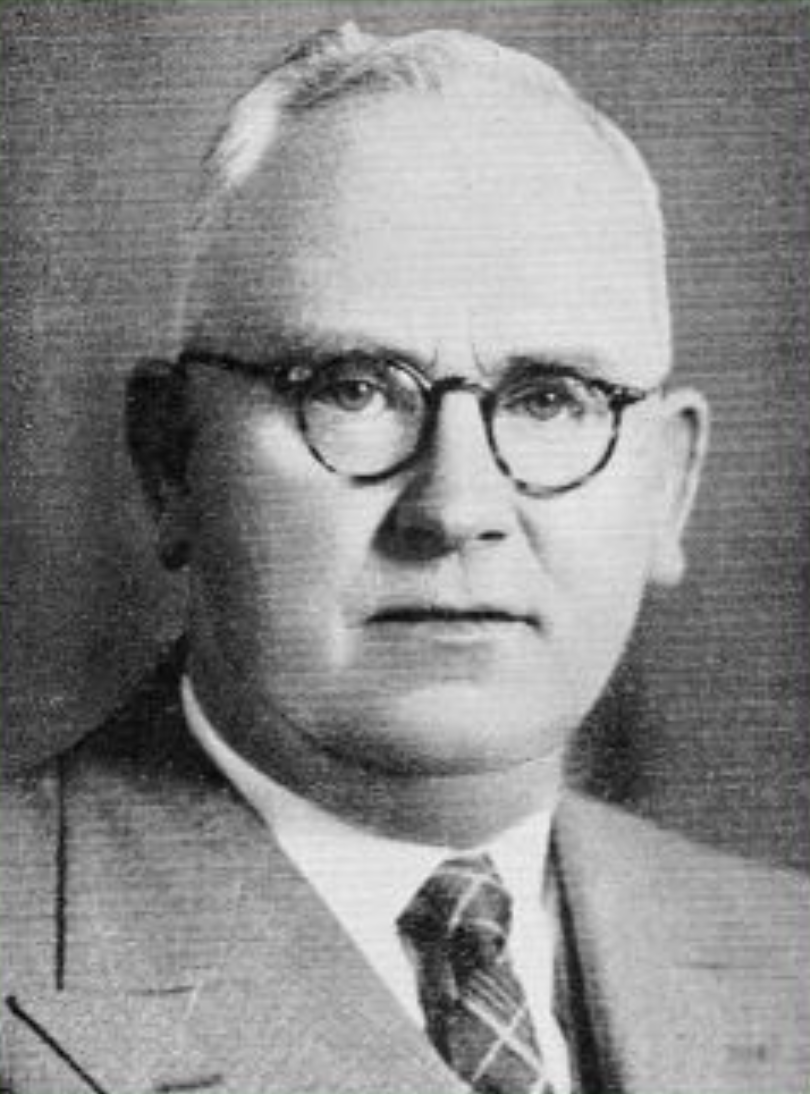

Member of the Australian Parliament for Griffith
- In office 20 May 1939 – 10 December 1949
- Preceded by: Frank Baker
- Succeeded by: Doug Berry

Personal details
- Born: 23 December 1895 Wadnaminga, South Australia
- Died: 28 February 1983 (aged 87)
- Party: Australian Labor Party
- Occupation: Draper

William Patrick Conelan (23 December 1895 – 28 February 1983) was an Australian politician. He was an Australian Labor Party member of the Australian House of Representatives from 1939 to 1949, representing the electorate of Griffith.

Conelan was born in Wadnaminga, South Australia and received a primary education. He became a tailors cutter, and at 17, he became the youngest journeyman admitted to the Cutters' Union in South Australia. He then to Sydney, where he was assistant secretary of the Tailors Cutters' Union aged 18. He moved to Brisbane in 1923, and was elected as a Brisbane City Council alderman for Kurilpa Ward in 1937. He served on the council's parks committee and remained on council until his election to parliament. He was also a member of the Brisbane and South Coast Hospitals Board, a long-serving delegate to the Australian Football Council, a member of the Council of the Workers Educational Association and a trustee of Perry Park.

At the 1939 by-election, Conelan was elected to the Australian House of Representatives as the Labor member for Griffith. He won by only eight votes, the closest result in the House of Representatives that has ever been allowed to stand. He was the government whip in the Curtin minority government from 1941 to 1943. He held the seat until his defeat in 1949.

Upon his defeat, Conelan became the first Queensland MP to qualify to the parliamentary pension scheme of £2000 or £8 per week. He listed his occupation as "business representative" in 1951. He was an unsuccessful Labor candidate for the Senate at the 1953 half-Senate election. He remained involved in Labor politics, serving as president of the party's Kurilpa branch and vice-president of its Griffith Federal Divisional Executive. He left the party in the 1957 Queensland Labor split and was a member of the campaign committee for the new Queensland Labor Party.

Conelan died in 1983.

Parliament of Australia
Preceded by Francis Baker	Member for Griffith; 1939–1949	Succeeded by Doug Berry
