= Terri Butler =

Australian lawyer and politician (born 1977)

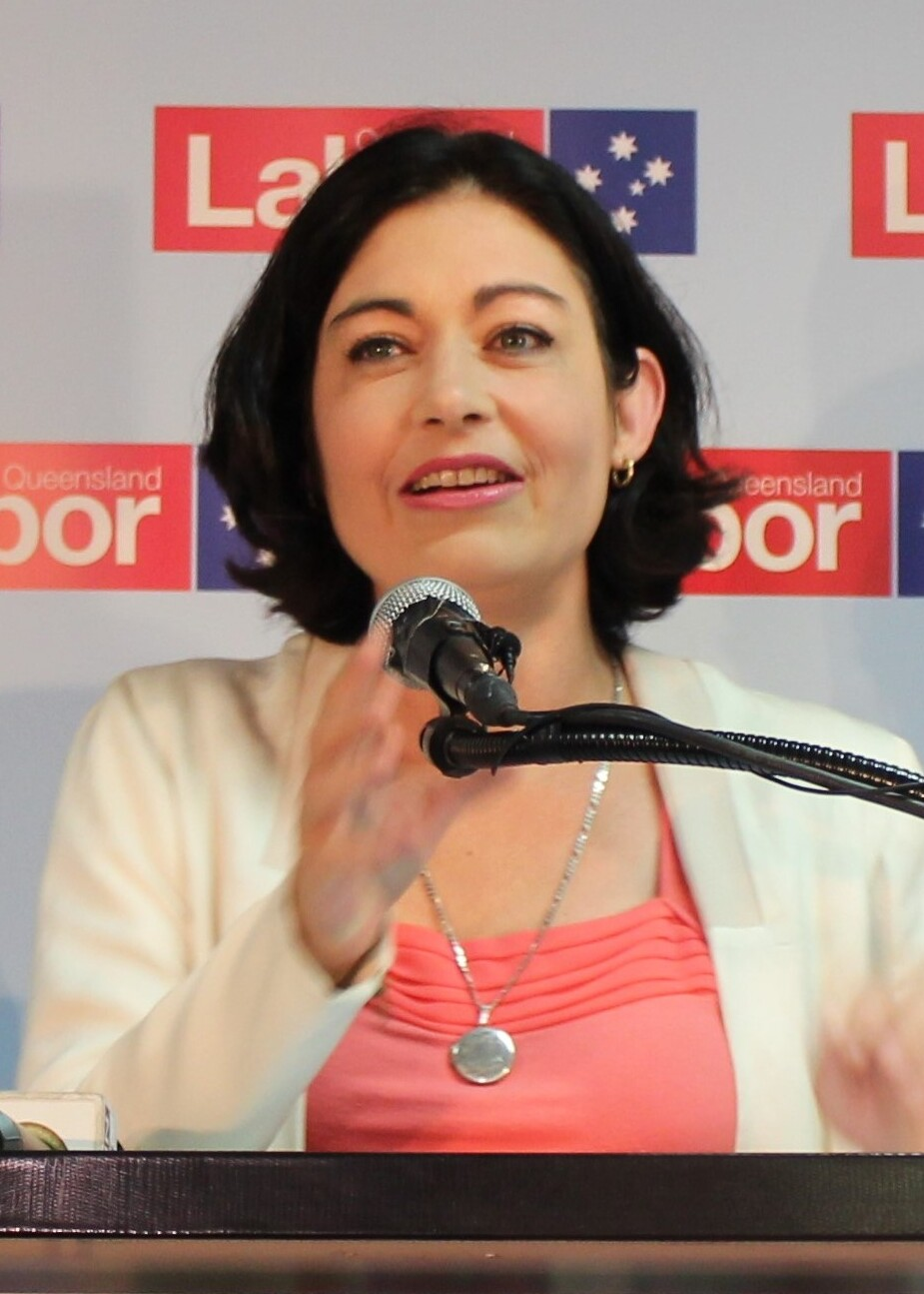
- Butler in 2014

Deputy President of the Fair Work Commission
- Incumbent
- Assumed office 9 September 2024
- President: Adam Hatcher
- Appointed by: Anthony Albanese

Member of the Queensland Industrial Relations Commission
- In office 8 January 2024 – 31 August 2024
- President: Peter Davis
- Appointed by: Steven Miles

Shadow Minister for the Environment and Water
- In office 2 June 2019 – 23 May 2022
- Leader: Anthony Albanese
- Preceded by: Tony Burke
- Succeeded by: Jonathon Duniam

Shadow Minister for Employment Services, Workforce Participation and Future of Work
- In office 21 August 2018 – 2 June 2019
- Leader: Bill Shorten
- Preceded by: Ed Husic
- Succeeded by: Richard Marles

Member of the Australian Parliament for Griffith
- In office 8 February 2014 – 21 May 2022
- Preceded by: Kevin Rudd
- Succeeded by: Max Chandler-Mather

Personal details
- Born: Terri Megan Butler; 28 November 1977 (age 48) Cairns, Queensland, Australia
- Party: Labor
- Spouse: Troy Spence
- Children: 2
- Education: Queensland University of Technology BA, LLB(Hons)
- Profession: Workplace relations lawyer
- Website: www.terributlermp.com

Terri Megan Butler (born 28 November 1977) is an Australian public servant and former politician. She was a member of the House of Representatives from 2014 to 2022, representing the seat of Griffith for the Australian Labor Party (ALP). She worked as an industrial lawyer prior to entering parliament and in 2024 was appointed as a deputy president of the Fair Work Commission.

== Early life ==
Butler was born on 28 November 1977 in Cairns, Queensland, the daughter of Allison and Larry Butler. She holds the degrees of Bachelor of Arts and Bachelor of Laws (Hons.) from the Queensland University of Technology. She also studied at James Cook University. As a student she worked for an engineering firm, at an aluminium factory and for the Australian Services Union.

Butler completed her articles of clerkship in 2003 and subsequently worked as an industrial lawyer. Prior to her election to parliament, she was a principal at Maurice Blackburn and led the firm's employment and workplace relations division in Queensland. She undertook further study at Melbourne Business School and had begun a Master of Laws degree at the University of Queensland.

== Political career ==
Prior to her election to parliament Butler held senior positions in the Australian Labor Party (Queensland Branch). She was secretary of the party's Yeronga branch, chair of the state party's rules committee, a member of the National Policy Forum, and a delegate to state and national conference.

=== Parliament ===
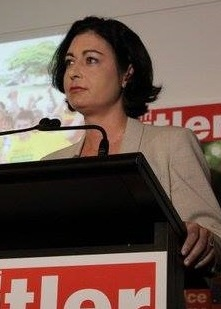
Butler in 2014

Butler was elected to the House of Representatives at the 2014 Griffith by-election, caused by the resignation of former prime minister Kevin Rudd. She won the seat with a 51.8 percent two-party vote against Liberal National Party candidate Bill Glasson, a swing against the ALP of 1.2 points. She is a member of the Labor Left faction, unlike Rudd who was from the Labor Unity.

Butler was re-elected at the 2016 and 2019 federal elections. She was promoted to shadow parliamentary secretary in October 2015 and to shadow minister in July 2016. Under opposition leaders Bill Shorten and Anthony Albanese, she held the portfolios of preventing family violence (2016–2018); employment services, workforce participation and future of work (2018–2019); young Australians and youth affairs (2018–2019); and the environment and water (2019–2022).

In July 2015, Butler along with Labor colleague Laurie Ferguson, Liberal MPs Warren Entsch and Teresa Gambaro, independents Andrew Wilkie and Cathy McGowan and Greens MP Adam Bandt, co-sponsored a bill to introduce same-sex marriage in Australia.

In September 2015, Butler led public opposition to anti-abortion activist Troy Newman entering Australia. She wrote to Immigration Minister Peter Dutton and requested he ask his department to consider cancellation of Newman's visa, which was revoked. Newman flew to Australia without a visa and was then deported after losing a High Court appeal.

In 2016, Butler was sued for defamation after an appearance on Q&A in which she implied Calum Thwaites, a Queensland University of Technology (QUT) student, had used a racial slur in a Facebook post. The allegations were first made by a third party in an earlier Racial Discrimination Act 1975 case against Thwaites which had been dismissed. Butler and Thwaites settled out of court, as a result of which she offered "my unreserved apology for enabling those meanings about you to be conveyed, and for the distress and damage to your reputation caused as a consequence".

At the 2022 federal election, Butler lost her seat of Griffith to Max Chandler-Mather of the Australian Greens, despite the ALP receiving a nationwide positive swing and forming a majority government. Unusually, despite being an incumbent, she was not one of the final two candidates in the two-candidate-preferred count for the seat; her preferences helped the Greens beat Olivia Roberts of the Liberal National Party.

== Post-politics ==
On 21 December 2023, the Queensland Government announced that Butler had been appointed as a Commissioner of the Queensland Industrial Relations Commission.

In August 2024, Butler was appointed by the Albanese government as a deputy president of the Fair Work Commission.

== Personal life ==
Butler has two children with her husband Troy Spence, a former Australian Workers' Union organiser who is currently a barrister at law.

She was previously in a relationship with state Labor MP Simon Finn.

Parliament of Australia
Preceded by Kevin Rudd	Member for Griffith; 2014–2022	Succeeded by Max Chandler-Mather
