= Wilfred Coutts =

Australian politician

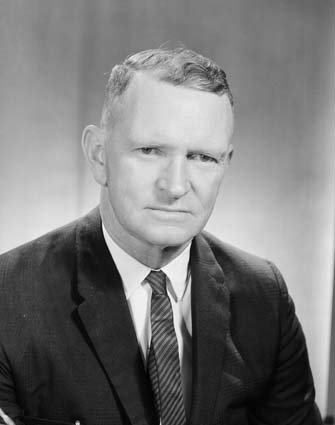

Member of the Australian Parliament for Griffith
- In office 29 May 1954 – 22 November 1958
- Preceded by: Doug Berry
- Succeeded by: Arthur Chresby
- In office 9 December 1961 – 26 November 1966
- Preceded by: Arthur Chresby
- Succeeded by: Don Cameron

Personal details
- Born: 10 June 1908 Marburg, Queensland
- Died: 4 November 1997 (aged 89)
- Party: Australian Labor Party
- Occupation: Salesman

Wilfred Charles Coutts (10 June 1908 – 4 November 1997) was an Australian politician. Born in Marburg, Queensland, he was educated at state schools before becoming a salesman. He was active in local politics as a member of Brisbane City Council. In 1954, he was elected to the Australian House of Representatives as the Labor member for Griffith. He held the seat until his defeat by Liberal candidate Arthur Chresby in 1958. He returned to the House in 1961, defeating Chresby. He held the seat until his defeat in 1966 by Don Cameron. Coutts died in 1997 and was buried in Nudgee Cemetery.

Parliament of Australia
Preceded by Doug Berry	Member for Griffith; 1954–1958	Succeeded by Arthur Chresby
Preceded by Arthur Chresby	Member for Griffith; 1961–1966	Succeeded by Don Cameron
