= Results of the 1987 Australian federal election in Queensland =

1987 Australian federal election (Queensland)
← 1984	11 July 1987	1990 →

All 39 Queensland seats in the Australian House of Representatives and all 12 seats in the Australian Senate
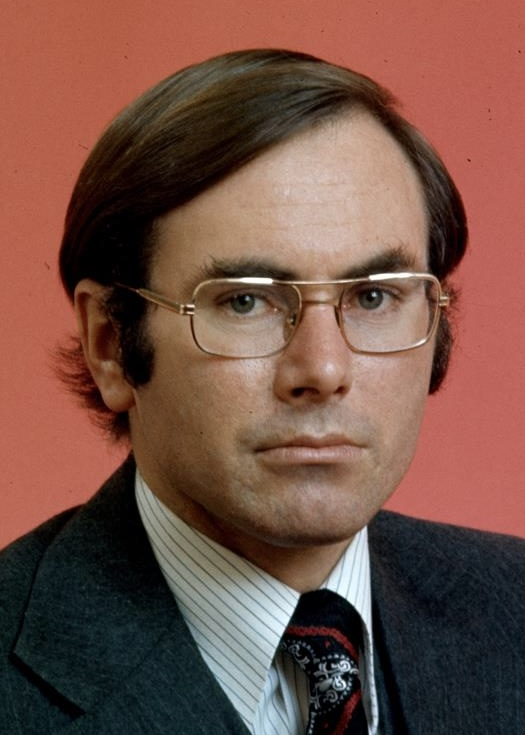

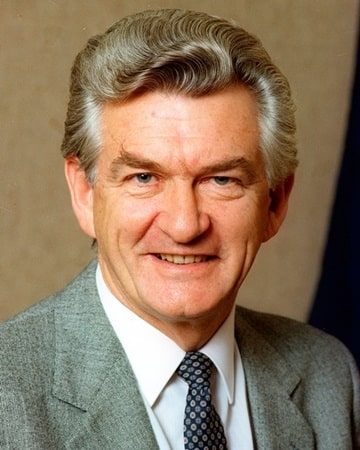
	First party	Second party
Leader	John Howard	Bob Hawke
Party	Liberal/National coalition	Labor
Last election	15 seats	9
Seats won	11 seats	13 seats
Seat change	▼4	▲4
Popular vote	758,234	683,640
Percentage	49.9%	45.0%
Swing	▼1.0	▲0.9
TPP	50.7%	49.3%
TPP swing	▼1.61	▲1.61

This is a list of electoral division results for the Australian 1987 federal election in the state of Queensland.

== Overall results ==
Turnout 92.2% (CV) — Informal 3.4%
Party	Votes	%	Swing	Seats	Change
National	438,627	28.85	-2.85	6	▼2
Liberal	319,607	21.02	1.86	5	▼2
Liberal/National Coalition	758,234	49.87	-0.99	11	▼4
Labor	683,640	44.96	0.90	13	▲4
Democrats	74,215	4.88	0.06		
Independent	2,684	0.18	-0.04		
Nuclear Disarmament	1,718	0.11	0.00		
Total	1,520,491			24	
Two-party-preferred vote
Labor	749,834	49.32	49.32	13	▲4
Liberal/National Coalition	770,515	50.68	49.32	11	▼4
Invalid/blank votes	53,622	3.41	-1.19		
Turnout	1,574,113	92.18			
Registered voters	1,707,701				
Source: Psephos Adam Carr's Election Archive 1987

== Results by division ==
=== Bowman ===
1987 Australian federal election: Bowman
Party	Candidate	Votes	%	±%
Labor	Con Sciacca	31,223	48.3	−3.3
Liberal	Andrew Crowe	14,866	23.0	+1.0
National	Bill Barry-Cotter	11,696	18.1	−2.0
Democrats	Diana Taylor	5,800	9.0	+2.5
Independent	Barry Cullen	1,123	1.7	+1.7
Total formal votes		64,708	96.3	
Informal votes		2,482	3.7	
Turnout		67,190	93.6	
Two-party-preferred result
Labor	Con Sciacca	35,609	55.0	−0.3
Liberal	Andrew Crowe	29,085	45.0	+0.3
Labor hold		Swing	−0.3	

=== Brisbane ===
1987 Australian federal election: Brisbane
Party	Candidate	Votes	%	±%
Labor	Manfred Cross	32,125	51.2	+0.9
Liberal	David Drake	17,543	28.0	+0.0
National	Cliff Newman	8,495	13.5	−2.0
Democrats	Michael van Prooyen	3,799	6.1	−0.1
Independent	William Kenney	792	1.3	+1.3
Total formal votes		62,754	97.1	
Informal votes		1,883	2.9	
Turnout		64,637	92.2	
Two-party-preferred result
Labor	Manfred Cross	35,409	56.4	+2.1
Liberal	David Drake	27,335	43.6	−2.1
Labor hold		Swing	+2.1	

=== Capricornia ===
1987 Australian federal election: Capricornia
Party	Candidate	Votes	%	±%
Labor	Keith Wright	34,147	54.0	+3.1
National	Ted Price	21,272	33.6	−3.0
Liberal	Tom Young	6,084	9.6	+0.5
Nuclear Disarmament	J. S. Page	1,718	2.7	+2.7
Total formal votes		63,221	97.3	
Informal votes		1,752	2.7	
Turnout		64,973	93.6	
Two-party-preferred result
Labor	Keith Wright	36,065	57.0	+2.9
National	Ted Price	27,155	43.0	−2.9
Labor hold		Swing	+2.9	

=== Dawson ===
1987 Australian federal election: Dawson
Party	Candidate	Votes	%	±%
Labor	Bill Welch	30,232	46.9	+2.2
National	Ray Braithwaite	29,698	46.1	−6.0
Liberal	Paul Pottinger	4,553	7.1	+7.1
Total formal votes		64,483	96.3	
Informal votes		2,510	3.7	
Turnout		66,993	92.8	
Two-party-preferred result
National	Ray Braithwaite	33,436	51.9	−1.9
Labor	Bill Welch	31,047	48.1	+1.9
National hold		Swing	−1.9	

=== Fadden ===
1987 Australian federal election: Fadden
Party	Candidate	Votes	%	±%
Labor	Peter Wilson	24,481	41.2	+0.6
Liberal	David Jull	21,258	35.8	−0.4
National	Peter Robinson	9,581	16.1	−0.6
Democrats	Kenneth Davies	4,065	6.8	+0.4
Total formal votes		59,385	96.6	
Informal votes		2,084	3.4	
Turnout		61,469	93.2	
Two-party-preferred result
Liberal	David Jull	32,311	54.4	−0.3
Labor	Peter Wilson	27,074	45.6	+0.3
Liberal hold		Swing	−0.3	

=== Fairfax ===
1987 Australian federal election: Fairfax
Party	Candidate	Votes	%	±%
National	Evan Adermann	24,817	39.8	−5.4
Labor	Alison Smith	21,953	35.2	+1.5
Liberal	Joy Brannelly	10,733	17.2	+3.0
Democrats	Brian Stockwell	4,786	7.7	+0.8
Total formal votes		62,289	96.8	
Informal votes		2,085	3.2	
Turnout		64,374	92.0	
Two-party-preferred result
National	Evan Adermann	35,713	57.3	−3.3
Labor	Alison Smith	26,565	42.7	+3.3
National hold		Swing	−3.3	

=== Fisher ===
1987 Australian federal election: Fisher
Party	Candidate	Votes	%	±%
Labor	Michael Lavarch	30,181	44.7	+2.3
National	Peter Slipper	24,522	36.3	−0.1
Liberal	Ian Mutch	8,208	12.2	−2.2
Democrats	Glen Spicer	4,597	6.8	−0.1
Total formal votes		67,508	96.7	
Informal votes		2,326	3.3	
Turnout		69,834	93.5	
Two-party-preferred result
Labor	Michael Lavarch	34,097	50.5	+2.8
National	Peter Slipper	33,394	49.5	−2.8
Labor gain from National		Swing	+2.8	

=== Forde ===
1987 Australian federal election: Forde
Party	Candidate	Votes	%	±%
Labor	Mary Crawford	27,441	46.4	+1.5
Liberal	David Watson	20,957	35.5	+3.7
National	Tony Philbrick	7,107	12.0	−4.5
Democrats	Sheila Rieff	3,582	6.1	−0.7
Total formal votes		59,087	96.7	
Informal votes		2,040	3.3	
Turnout		61,127	92.3	
Two-party-preferred result
Labor	Mary Crawford	30,152	51.0	+1.0
Liberal	David Watson	28,925	49.0	−1.0
Labor gain from Liberal		Swing	+1.0	

=== Griffith ===
1987 Australian federal election: Griffith
Party	Candidate	Votes	%	±%
Labor	Ben Humphreys	33,442	54.5	+0.1
Liberal	Wayne Black	14,778	24.1	+1.0
National	Sean Cousins	8,550	13.9	−2.4
Democrats	Lance Winter	4,647	7.6	+2.5
Total formal votes		61,417	95.7	
Informal votes		2,754	4.3	
Turnout		64,171	89.0	
Two-party-preferred result
Labor	Ben Humphreys	37,098	60.4	+0.1
Liberal	Wayne Black	24,312	39.6	−0.1
Labor hold		Swing	+0.1	

=== Groom ===
1987 Australian federal election: Groom
Party	Candidate	Votes	%	±%
National	Tom McVeigh	32,054	48.9	−7.1
Labor	Linda Dwyer	21,217	32.4	+0.9
Liberal	Alexander Munro	8,754	13.3	+4.4
Democrats	Mark Carew	3,556	5.4	+1.8
Total formal votes		65,581	97.1	
Informal votes		1,938	2.9	
Turnout		67,519	93.4	
Two-party-preferred result
National	Tom McVeigh	41,174	62.8	−3.1
Labor	Linda Dwyer	24,407	37.2	+3.1
National hold		Swing	−3.1	

=== Herbert ===
1987 Australian federal election: Herbert
Party	Candidate	Votes	%	±%
Labor	Ted Lindsay	33,507	51.1	+0.8
National	Jose Goicoechea	18,206	27.7	−3.9
Liberal	Rosemary Pavey	10,571	16.1	+1.9
Democrats	Paul Swanton	3,344	5.1	+1.2
Total formal votes		65,628	96.6	
Informal votes		2,338	3.4	
Turnout		67,966	90.3	
Two-party-preferred result
Labor	Ted Lindsay	37,259	56.8	+3.2
National	Jose Goicoechea	28,360	43.2	−3.2
Labor hold		Swing	+3.2	

=== Hinkler ===
1987 Australian federal election: Hinkler
Party	Candidate	Votes	%	±%
Labor	Brian Courtice	30,814	48.1	+1.0
National	Bryan Conquest	27,665	43.1	−0.4
Liberal	John Williams	3,604	5.6	+0.6
Democrats	Geoff Boshell	2,039	3.2	−0.7
Total formal votes		64,122	97.4	
Informal votes		1,733	2.6	
Turnout		65,855	93.8	
Two-party-preferred result
Labor	Brian Courtice	32,753	51.1	+1.3
National	Bryan Conquest	31,367	48.9	−1.3
Labor gain from National		Swing	+1.3	

=== Kennedy ===
1987 Australian federal election: Kennedy
Party	Candidate	Votes	%	±%
National	Bob Katter, Sr.	28,585	47.3	−3.0
Labor	James Byrne	27,208	45.1	+2.2
Liberal	Ross Cooper	4,584	7.6	+3.6
Total formal votes		60,377	94.9	
Informal votes		3,276	5.1	
Turnout		63,653	89.2	
Two-party-preferred result
National	Bob Katter, Sr.	31,989	53.0	−2.2
Labor	James Byrne	28,380	47.0	+2.2
National hold		Swing	−2.2	

=== Leichhardt ===
1987 Australian federal election: Leichhardt
Party	Candidate	Votes	%	±%
Labor	John Gayler	31,601	50.8	−0.2
National	Kevin Byrne	22,551	36.3	+0.0
Liberal	Ronald Barry	5,942	9.6	+2.6
Democrats	Wilfred Tapau	2,085	3.4	−1.4
Total formal votes		62,179	95.6	
Informal votes		2,846	4.4	
Turnout		65,025	90.2	
Two-party-preferred result
Labor	John Gayler	33,747	54.3	−1.2
National	Kevin Byrne	28,430	45.7	+1.2
Labor hold		Swing	−1.2	

=== Lilley ===
1987 Australian federal election: Lilley
Party	Candidate	Votes	%	±%
Labor	Elaine Darling	36,248	57.3	+2.8
Liberal	John Gates	17,181	27.2	+2.5
National	Andrew Brown	9,842	15.6	−3.9
Total formal votes		63,271	96.6	
Informal votes		2,226	3.4	
Turnout		65,497	91.8	
Two-party-preferred result
Labor	Elaine Darling	36,848	58.2	+2.5
Liberal	John Gates	26,422	41.8	−2.5
Labor hold		Swing	+2.5	

=== Maranoa ===
1987 Australian federal election: Maranoa
Party	Candidate	Votes	%	±%
National	Ian Cameron	35,594	55.5	−7.4
Labor	Raymond Paroz	20,596	32.1	+0.6
Liberal	Bruce Christie	5,364	8.4	+8.4
Democrats	Richard McCarthy	2,605	4.1	−1.5
Total formal votes		64,159	95.9	
Informal votes		2,728	4.1	
Turnout		66,887	93.1	
Two-party-preferred result
National	Ian Cameron	41,604	64.9	−0.6
Labor	Raymond Paroz	22,550	35.1	+0.6
National hold		Swing	−0.6	

=== McPherson ===
1987 Australian federal election: McPherson
Party	Candidate	Votes	%	±%
Liberal	Peter White	27,147	38.4	−1.4
Labor	Pat Stern	23,850	33.7	+1.5
National	Max McMahon	15,974	22.6	−0.6
Democrats	Yvonne Stoelhorst	3,746	5.3	+1.0
Total formal votes		70,717	96.8	
Informal votes		2,367	3.2	
Turnout		73,084	90.5	
Two-party-preferred result
Liberal	Peter White	44,263	62.6	−0.9
Labor	Pat Stern	26,454	37.4	+0.9
Liberal hold		Swing	−0.9	

=== Moncrieff ===
1987 Australian federal election: Moncrieff
Party	Candidate	Votes	%	±%
Labor	Robert Boyce	23,067	35.9	−0.1
Liberal	Kathy Sullivan	22,271	34.7	+3.8
National	Lester Hughes	15,405	24.0	−3.9
Democrats	George Spencer	3,444	5.4	+1.7
Total formal votes		64,187	96.6	
Informal votes		2,234	3.4	
Turnout		66,421	91.4	
Two-party-preferred result
Liberal	Kathy Sullivan	38,644	60.2	+0.3
Labor	Robert Boyce	25,543	39.8	−0.3
Liberal hold		Swing	+0.3	

=== Moreton ===
1987 Australian federal election: Moreton
Party	Candidate	Votes	%	±%
Labor	Garrie Gibson	28,053	45.1	+1.6
Liberal	Don Cameron	23,740	38.2	−4.4
National	Peter Freckleton	6,712	10.8	+1.7
Democrats	Manfred Willinger	3,665	5.9	+1.0
Total formal votes		62,170	97.0	
Informal votes		1,933	3.0	
Turnout		64,103	93.5	
Two-party-preferred result
Liberal	Don Cameron	31,518	50.7	−2.6
Labor	Garrie Gibson	30,645	49.3	+2.6
Liberal hold		Swing	−2.6	

=== Oxley ===
1987 Australian federal election: Oxley
Party	Candidate	Votes	%	±%
Labor	Bill Hayden	36,246	59.9	+0.4
National	Barry Hoffensetz	12,248	20.2	+1.2
Liberal	Janice Akroyd	8,948	14.8	−2.0
Democrats	John Loughney	3,081	5.1	+0.4
Total formal votes		60,523	96.8	
Informal votes		2,023	3.2	
Turnout		62,546	92.0	
Two-party-preferred result
Labor	Bill Hayden	39,256	64.9	+1.9
National	Barry Hoffensetz	21,265	35.1	−1.9
Labor hold		Swing	+1.9	

=== Petrie ===
1987 Australian federal election: Petrie
Party	Candidate	Votes	%	±%
Labor	Gary Johns	30,537	46.2	+0.0
Liberal	John Hodges	21,780	33.0	−0.2
National	Gerard Cross	9,375	14.2	−1.6
Democrats	Isobel Robinson	4,404	6.7	+1.9
Total formal votes		66,096	97.0	
Informal votes		2,013	3.0	
Turnout		68,109	93.5	
Two-party-preferred result
Labor	Gary Johns	33,995	51.4	+2.0
Liberal	John Hodges	32,086	48.6	−2.0
Labor gain from Liberal		Swing	+2.0	

=== Rankin ===
1987 Australian federal election: Rankin
Party	Candidate	Votes	%	±%
Labor	David Beddall	29,118	49.2	+2.5
National	Gerard Walsh	13,256	22.4	−1.3
Liberal	John Patterson	7,769	13.1	−1.3
National	Peter Jorgenson	5,708	9.6	+9.6
Democrats	Miriam Cope	2,599	4.4	−1.2
Independent	Michael Dunne	670	1.1	+1.1
Independent	Terri Cavanagh	99	0.2	+0.2
Total formal votes		59,219	95.8	
Informal votes		2,578	4.2	
Turnout		67,797	92.1	
Two-party-preferred result
Labor	David Beddall	32,415	54.7	+4.2
National	Gerard Walsh	26,791	45.3	−4.2
Labor hold		Swing	+4.2	

=== Ryan ===
1987 Australian federal election: Ryan
Party	Candidate	Votes	%	±%
Liberal	John Moore	28,356	42.6	+1.9
Labor	Fleur Yuile	23,538	35.4	+1.4
National	Steve Walters	9,015	13.5	−3.5
Democrats	Daphne Woodhouse	5,657	8.5	+0.2
Total formal votes		66,566	97.9	
Informal votes		1,401	2.1	
Turnout		67,967	92.5	
Two-party-preferred result
Liberal	John Moore	39,181	58.9	−1.5
Labor	Fleur Yuile	27,379	41.1	+1.5
Liberal hold		Swing	−1.5	

=== Wide Bay ===
1987 Australian federal election: Wide Bay
Party	Candidate	Votes	%	±%
National	Clarrie Millar	30,699	50.5	−8.6
Labor	Andrew Foley	22,815	37.5	+1.6
Liberal	Cam Primavera	4,616	7.6	+7.6
Democrats	Ray Barry	2,714	4.5	−0.5
Total formal votes		60,844	96.7	
Informal votes		2,072	3.3	
Turnout		62,916	93.7	
Two-party-preferred result
National	Clarrie Millar	35,755	58.8	−3.0
Labor	Andrew Foley	25,087	41.2	+3.0
National hold		Swing	−3.0	

== See also ==
- Results of the 1987 Australian federal election (House of Representatives)
- Members of the Australian House of Representatives, 1987–1990
