= Results of the 1990 Australian federal election in Queensland =

1990 Australian federal election (Queensland)
- 24 March 1990

All 24 Queensland seats in the Australian House of Representatives and 6 seats in the Australian Senate
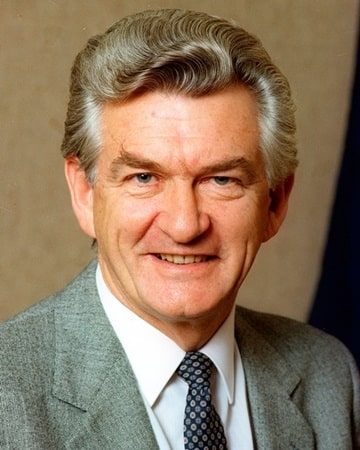

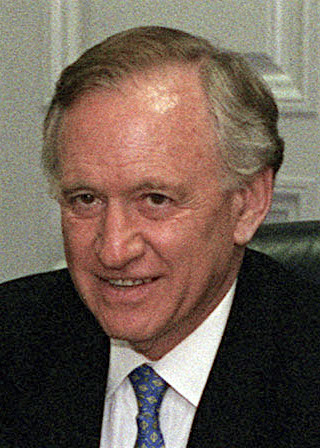
	First party	Second party
Leader	Bob Hawke	Andrew Peacock
Party	Labor	Liberal/National coalition
Last election	13	11 seats
Seats won	15 seats	9 seats
Seat change	▲2	▼2
Popular vote	695,291	756,680
Percentage	41.6%	45.3%
Swing	▼3.4	▼4.6
TPP	50.19%	49.81%
TPP swing	▲0.87	▼0.87

This is a list of electoral division results for the Australian 1990 federal election in the state of Queensland.

== Overall results ==
Turnout 94.7% (CV) — Informal 2.2%
Party	Votes	%	Swing	Seats	Change
Liberal	476,560	28.51	7.49	6	▲1
National	280,120	16.76	–12.09	3	▼3
Liberal/National Coalition	756,680	45.27	–4.60	9	▼2
Labor	695,291	41.59	–3.37	15	▲2
Democrats	193,817	11.59	6.71		
Independent	11,499	0.69	0.51		
Greens	10,054	0.60	0.60		
Democratic Socialist	2,728	0.16	0.16		
Conservative	1,528	0.09	0.09		
Total	1,671,597			24	
Two-party-preferred vote
Labor	837,508	50.19	+0.87	15	▲2
Liberal/National Coalition	831,015	49.81	–0.87	9	▼2
Invalid/blank votes	38,065	2.23	–1.18		
Turnout	1,709,662	94.71			
Registered voters	1,805,141				
Source: Federal Elections 1990

== Results by division ==
=== Bowman ===
1990 Australian federal election: Bowman
Party	Candidate	Votes	%	±%
Labor	Con Sciacca	34,925	46.3	−2.0
Liberal	Peter Trounce	23,571	31.3	+8.3
Democrats	Phillip Grattan	12,207	16.2	+7.2
National	Stan Brimson	4,697	6.2	−11.9
Total formal votes		75,400	97.7	
Informal votes		1,773	2.3	
Turnout		77,173	95.6	
Two-party-preferred result
Labor	Con Sciacca	43,275	57.5	+2.5
Liberal	Peter Trounce	31,950	42.5	−2.5
Labor hold		Swing	+2.5	

=== Brisbane ===
1990 Australian federal election: Brisbane
Party	Candidate	Votes	%	±%
Labor	Arch Bevis	29,146	45.7	−5.5
Liberal	Keith Schafferius	22,573	35.4	+7.4
Democrats	Leo Talty	7,814	12.3	+6.2
National	Andrew Hassall	1,925	3.0	−10.5
Independent	Marylou Heath	1,410	2.2	+2.2
Independent	William Kenney	464	0.7	−0.6
Democratic Socialist	Peter Simmons	416	0.7	+0.7
Total formal votes		63,748	97.9	
Informal votes		1,384	2.1	
Turnout		65,132	95.1	
Two-party-preferred result
Labor	Arch Bevis	35,300	55.5	−0.9
Liberal	Keith Schafferius	28,342	44.5	+0.9
Labor hold		Swing	−0.9	

=== Capricornia ===
1990 Australian federal election: Capricornia
Party	Candidate	Votes	%	±%
Labor	Keith Wright	33,200	50.5	−3.5
National	Stan Collard	24,627	37.5	+3.9
Greens	Craig Hardy	7,885	12.0	+12.0
Total formal votes		65,712	97.9	
Informal votes		1,413	2.1	
Turnout		67,125	95.7	
Two-party-preferred result
Labor	Keith Wright	37,551	57.3	+0.3
National	Stan Collard	27,926	42.7	−0.3
Labor hold		Swing	+0.3	

=== Dawson ===
1990 Australian federal election: Dawson
Party	Candidate	Votes	%	±%
Labor	Greg McGarvie	29,869	42.9	−4.0
National	Ray Braithwaite	26,780	38.4	−7.7
Liberal	Jim Seymour	7,459	10.7	+3.6
Democrats	Tom Irelandes	5,566	8.0	+8.0
Total formal votes		69,674	97.9	
Informal votes		1,525	2.1	
Turnout		71,199	95.1	
Two-party-preferred result
National	Ray Braithwaite	34,873	50.1	−1.8
Labor	Greg McGarvie	34,692	49.9	+1.8
National hold		Swing	−1.8	

=== Fadden ===
1990 Australian federal election: Fadden
Party	Candidate	Votes	%	±%
Liberal	David Jull	28,361	43.9	+8.1
Labor	Marie Wilkinson	24,388	37.8	−3.4
Democrats	Eugene Cross	8,641	13.4	+6.6
National	Peter Freckleton	2,354	3.6	−12.5
Independent	Richard Heymann	794	1.2	+1.2
Total formal votes		64,538	97.8	
Informal votes		1,438	2.2	
Turnout		66,021	95.3	
Two-party-preferred result
Liberal	David Jull	34,621	53.8	−0.6
Labor	Marie Wilkinson	29,766	46.2	+0.6
Liberal hold		Swing	−0.6	

=== Fairfax ===
1990 Australian federal election: Fairfax
Party	Candidate	Votes	%	±%
Labor	Beryl Muspratt	26,017	32.8	−2.4
National	John Stone	20,928	26.4	−13.4
Liberal	Alex Somlyay	20,395	25.7	+8.5
Democrats	Bob Borsellino	10,439	13.2	+5.5
Conservative	Sheila Adams	1,528	1.9	+1.9
Total formal votes		79,307	98.0	
Informal votes		1,632	2.0	
Turnout		80,939	94.8	
Two-party-preferred result
Liberal	Alex Somlyay	45,449	57.5	+57.5
Labor	Beryl Muspratt	33,634	42.5	−0.2
Liberal gain from National		Swing	+0.2	

=== Fisher ===
1990 Australian federal election: Fisher
Party	Candidate	Votes	%	±%
Labor	Michael Lavarch	35,004	42.8	−1.9
Liberal	Tony Holmes	21,225	26.0	+13.8
National	Brian Sheahan	14,490	17.7	−18.6
Democrats	Glen Spicer	10,981	13.4	+6.6
Total formal votes		81,700	98.0	
Informal votes		1,655	2.0	
Turnout		83,355	95.9	
Two-party-preferred result
Labor	Michael Lavarch	42,401	52.0	+1.5
Liberal	Tony Holmes	39,136	48.0	+48.0
Labor hold		Swing	+1.5	

=== Forde ===
1990 Australian federal election: Forde
Party	Candidate	Votes	%	±%
Labor	Mary Crawford	28,063	43.7	−2.7
Liberal	Brad Bauman	24,232	37.7	+2.2
Democrats	Jason Neville	7,138	11.1	+5.0
Greens	Coral Wynter	2,169	3.4	+3.4
National	Ross Adams	1,967	3.1	−8.9
Independent	John Duggan	646	1.0	+1.0
Total formal votes		64,215	97.4	
Informal votes		1,717	2.6	
Turnout		65,932	94.4	
Two-party-preferred result
Labor	Mary Crawford	34,910	54.5	+3.5
Liberal	Brad Bauman	29,161	45.5	−3.5
Labor hold		Swing	+3.5	

=== Griffith ===
1990 Australian federal election: Griffith
Party	Candidate	Votes	%	±%
Labor	Ben Humphreys	31,616	49.8	−4.7
Liberal	Doug Edwards	20,580	32.4	+8.3
Democrats	Steven Lyndon	8,431	13.3	+5.7
National	Sean Cousins	1,872	2.9	−11.0
Democratic Socialist	Russel Norman	963	1.5	+1.5
Total formal votes		63,462	97.2	
Informal votes		1,812	2.8	
Turnout		65,274	93.0	
Two-party-preferred result
Labor	Ben Humphreys	38,179	60.3	−0.1
Liberal	Doug Edwards	25,155	39.7	+0.1
Labor hold		Swing	−0.1	

=== Groom ===
1990 Australian federal election: Groom
Party	Candidate	Votes	%	±%
Liberal	Bill Taylor	29,041	40.8	+27.5
Labor	Stewart Scott-Irving	22,103	31.1	−1.3
National	Terry Day	11,664	16.4	−32.5
Democrats	Trevor Ives	8,319	11.7	+6.3
Total formal votes		71,127	98.1	
Informal votes		1,396	1.9	
Turnout		72,523	95.9	
Two-party-preferred result
Liberal	Bill Taylor	44,138	62.2	+1.9
Labor	Stewart Scott-Irving	26,880	37.8	−1.9
Liberal hold		Swing	+1.9	

=== Herbert ===
1990 Australian federal election: Herbert
Party	Candidate	Votes	%	±%
Labor	Ted Lindsay	32,166	45.8	−5.3
Liberal	Peter Hazard	17,384	24.8	+8.7
National	Rick Anderton	12,749	18.2	−9.5
Democrats	Colin Parker	7,885	11.2	+6.1
Total formal votes		70,184	98.0	
Informal votes		1,419	2.0	
Turnout		71,603	93.3	
Two-party-preferred result
Labor	Ted Lindsay	38,438	54.9	−1.9
Liberal	Peter Hazard	31,529	45.1	+45.1
Labor hold		Swing	−1.9	

=== Hinkler ===
1990 Australian federal election: Hinkler
Party	Candidate	Votes	%	±%
Labor	Brian Courtice	32,995	47.3	−0.8
National	John Evans	23,453	33.7	−9.4
Democrats	Ronald Cullen	6,630	9.5	+6.3
Liberal	Frank Hibble	6,618	9.5	+3.9
Total formal votes		69,696	97.7	
Informal votes		1,620	2.3	
Turnout		71,316	96.1	
Two-party-preferred result
Labor	Brian Courtice	37,543	54.0	+2.9
National	John Evans	32,033	46.0	−2.9
Labor hold		Swing	+2.9	

=== Kennedy ===
1990 Australian federal election: Kennedy
Party	Candidate	Votes	%	±%
Labor	Rob Hulls	28,936	44.3	−0.8
National	Ross Shannon	21,751	33.3	−14.0
Liberal	Fred Tritton	9,134	14.0	+6.4
Democrats	Patricia Banzhaf	5,473	8.4	+8.4
Total formal votes		65,294	97.2	
Informal votes		1,901	2.8	
Turnout		67,195	92.6	
Two-party-preferred result
Labor	Rob Hulls	33,536	51.4	+4.4
National	Ross Shannon	31,702	48.6	−4.4
Labor gain from National		Swing	+4.4	

=== Leichhardt ===
1990 Australian federal election: Leichhardt
Party	Candidate	Votes	%	±%
Labor	John Gayler	31,318	44.5	−6.3
Liberal	Bill Cummings	15,985	22.7	+13.1
National	Kevin Byrne	14,553	20.7	−15.6
Democrats	Jim Downey	7,382	10.5	+7.1
Independent	Jim Waldock	1,148	1.6	+1.6
Total formal votes		70,386	97.5	
Informal votes		1,816	2.5	
Turnout		72,202	92.7	
Two-party-preferred result
Labor	John Gayler	37,606	53.5	−0.8
Liberal	Bill Cummings	32,727	46.5	+46.5
Labor hold		Swing	−0.8	

=== Lilley ===
1990 Australian federal election: Lilley
Party	Candidate	Votes	%	±%
Labor	Elaine Darling	32,453	50.0	−7.3
Liberal	Ronald Nankervis	22,644	34.9	+7.7
Democrats	Elizabeth Rowland	7,023	10.8	+10.8
National	Steve Purtill	2,217	3.4	−12.2
Democratic Socialist	Dave Riley	557	0.9	+0.9
Total formal votes		64,894	97.9	
Informal votes		1,418	2.1	
Turnout		66,312	94.4	
Two-party-preferred result
Labor	Elaine Darling	37,373	57.7	−0.5
Liberal	Ronald Nankervis	27,422	42.3	+0.5
Labor hold		Swing	−0.5	

=== Maranoa ===
1990 Australian federal election: Maranoa
Party	Candidate	Votes	%	±%
National	Bruce Scott	31,594	47.7	−7.8
Labor	John Adams	20,716	31.3	−0.8
Liberal	John Stone	8,373	12.6	−7.8
Democrats	Mary Hopkins	5,567	8.4	+4.3
Total formal votes		66,250	97.8	
Informal votes		1,469	2.2	
Turnout		67,719	94.7	
Two-party-preferred result
National	Bruce Scott	41,838	63.2	−1.7
Labor	John Adams	24,351	36.8	+1.7
National hold		Swing	−1.7	

=== McPherson ===
1990 Australian federal election: McPherson
Party	Candidate	Votes	%	±%
Liberal	John Bradford	40,986	50.2	+11.8
Labor	Pat Stern	26,607	32.6	−1.1
Democrats	Robert North	8,088	9.9	+4.6
National	Randall Cook	4,102	5.0	−17.6
Independent	Bert Cockerill	1,703	2.1	+2.1
Independent	Otto Kuhne	170	0.2	+0.2
Total formal votes		81,656	97.8	
Informal votes		1,812	2.2	
Turnout		83,468	93.5	
Two-party-preferred result
Liberal	John Bradford	49,760	61.0	−1.6
Labor	Pat Stern	31,769	39.0	+1.6
Liberal hold		Swing	−1.6	

=== Moncrieff ===
1990 Australian federal election: Moncrieff
Party	Candidate	Votes	%	±%
Liberal	Kathy Sullivan	37,630	47.8	+13.1
Labor	Col Struthers	26,473	33.6	−2.3
Democrats	Jonathan Cornish	10,028	12.7	+7.3
National	Peter Lyons	4,549	5.8	−18.2
Total formal votes		78,680	97.6	
Informal votes		1,941	2.4	
Turnout		80,621	93.9	
Two-party-preferred result
Liberal	Kathy Sullivan	46,759	59.5	−0.7
Labor	Col Struthers	31,868	40.5	+0.7
Liberal hold		Swing	−0.7	

=== Moreton ===
1990 Australian federal election: Moreton
Party	Candidate	Votes	%	±%
Labor	Garrie Gibson	26,960	42.7	−2.4
Liberal	Don Cameron	26,323	41.7	+3.5
Democrats	Ken Davies	8,516	13.5	+7.6
National	Vince Cottrell	1,366	2.2	−8.6
Total formal votes		63,165	98.0	
Informal votes		1,275	2.0	
Turnout		64,440	95.3	
Two-party-preferred result
Labor	Garrie Gibson	32,996	52.3	+3.0
Liberal	Don Cameron	30,037	47.7	−3.0
Labor gain from Liberal		Swing	+3.0	

=== Oxley ===
1990 Australian federal election: Oxley
Party	Candidate	Votes	%	±%
Labor	Les Scott	33,359	52.1	−7.8
Liberal	David Cooke	18,739	29.3	+14.5
Democrats	Althea Rossmuller	9,660	15.1	+10.0
National	Ray Wilms	2,267	3.5	−16.7
Total formal votes		64,025	97.5	
Informal votes		1,660	2.5	
Turnout		65,685	95.5	
Two-party-preferred result
Labor	Les Scott	39,615	62.0	−2.9
Liberal	David Cooke	24,270	38.0	+38.0
Labor hold		Swing	−2.9	

=== Petrie ===
1990 Australian federal election: Petrie
Party	Candidate	Votes	%	±%
Labor	Gary Johns	30,763	44.2	−2.0
Liberal	Bruce Flegg	27,992	40.2	+7.2
Democrats	Anthony Bloomer	7,740	11.1	+4.4
National	Peter Bateman	2,327	3.3	−10.9
Democratic Socialist	Natasha Simons	792	1.1	+1.1
Total formal votes		69,614	98.1	
Informal votes		1,335	1.9	
Turnout		70,949	95.2	
Two-party-preferred result
Labor	Gary Johns	36,327	52.3	+0.9
Liberal	Bruce Flegg	33,185	47.7	−0.9
Labor hold		Swing	+0.9	

=== Rankin ===
1990 Australian federal election: Rankin
Party	Candidate	Votes	%	±%
Labor	David Beddall	31,782	46.3	−2.9
Liberal	John Miles	16,014	23.3	+10.2
National	Huan Fraser	11,065	16.1	−15.9
Democrats	John Hoskins	7,512	10.9	+6.5
Independent	Richard Whiteman	1,865	2.7	+2.7
Independent	Cheryl Crisp	465	0.7	+0.7
Total formal votes		68,703	97.3	
Informal votes		1,916	2.7	
Turnout		70,619	94.2	
Two-party-preferred result
Labor	David Beddall	38,037	55.5	+0.7
Liberal	John Miles	30,519	44.5	+44.5
Labor hold		Swing	+0.7	

=== Ryan ===
1990 Australian federal election: Ryan
Party	Candidate	Votes	%	±%
Liberal	John Moore	31,301	43.8	+1.2
Labor	Denny Campbell	21,085	29.5	−5.9
Democrats	Adair Ferguson	13,669	19.1	+10.6
National	Helen McAllister	4,325	6.0	−7.5
Independent	Alan Skyring	1,139	1.6	+1.6
Total formal votes		71,519	98.7	
Informal votes		955	1.3	
Turnout		72,474	95.6	
Two-party-preferred result
Liberal	John Moore	40,870	57.2	−1.7
Labor	Denny Campbell	30,576	42.8	+1.7
Liberal hold		Swing	−1.7	

=== Wide Bay ===
1990 Australian federal election: Wide Bay
Party	Candidate	Votes	%	±%
National	Warren Truss	32,498	47.3	−3.2
Labor	Andrew Foley	25,347	36.9	−0.6
Democrats	Bryan Sandall	9,108	13.3	+8.8
Independent	John Zschech	1,695	2.5	+2.5
Total formal votes		68,648	97.5	
Informal votes		1,738	2.5	
Turnout		70,386	95.6	
Two-party-preferred result
National	Warren Truss	37,613	54.9	−3.9
Labor	Andrew Foley	30,885	45.1	+3.9
National hold		Swing	−3.9	

== See also ==
- Results of the 1990 Australian federal election (House of Representatives)
- Members of the Australian House of Representatives, 1990–1993
