= Electoral results for the Division of Fadden =

Australian division election results

This is a list of electoral results for the Division of Fadden in Australian federal elections from the division's creation in 1977 until the present.

== Members ==
Member	Party	Term
Don Cameron	Liberal	1977–1983
David Beddall	Labor	1983–1984
David Jull	Liberal	1984–2007
Stuart Robert	Liberal	2007–2010
Stuart Robert	Liberal National	2010–2023
Cameron Caldwell	Liberal National	2023–Present

== Election results ==
=== Elections in the 2020s ===
==== 2025 ====
2025 Australian federal election: Fadden
Party	Candidate	Votes	%	±%
Liberal National	Cameron Caldwell	45,627	40.96	−3.66
Labor	Letitia Del Fabbro	30,526	27.40	+5.05
Greens	Andrew Stimson	10,359	9.30	−1.43
One Nation	Nick Muir	8,896	7.99	−0.69
People First	John Armfield	4,938	4.43	+4.43
Trumpet of Patriots	Nathan O'Brien	4,561	4.09	+4.09
Independent	Stewart Brooker	3,124	2.80	−1.37
Family First	Patricia Martin	2,198	1.97	+1.97
Citizens	Dennis Pukallus	1,169	1.05	+1.05
Total formal votes		111,398	94.25	−1.44
Informal votes		6,793	5.75	+1.44
Turnout		118,191	87.08	+0.54
Two-party-preferred result
Liberal National	Cameron Caldwell	63,364	56.88	−3.75
Labor	Letitia Del Fabbro	48,034	43.12	+3.75
Liberal National hold		Swing	−3.75	

==== 2023 by-election ====
2023 Fadden by-election
Party	Candidate	Votes	%	±%
Liberal National	Cameron Caldwell	43,554	49.08	+4.46
Labor	Letitia Del Fabbro	19,580	22.06	–0.29
One Nation	Sandy Roach	7,896	8.90	+0.22
Legalise Cannabis	Suzette Luyken	6,424	7.24	+7.24
Greens	Scott Turner	5,477	6.17	–4.56
Independent	Belinda Jones	931	1.05	+1.05
Indigenous-Aboriginal	Marnie Laree Davis	895	1.01	+1.01
Independent	Stewart Brooker	805	0.91	–3.26
Sustainable Australia	Quentin Bye	779	0.88	+0.88
Independent	Kevin Young	641	0.72	+0.72
Federation	James Tayler	607	0.68	+0.68
Democrats	Chris Simpson	589	0.66	+0.66
Citizens	Jan Pukallus	570	0.64	+0.64
Total formal votes		88,748	93.20	−2.49
Informal votes		6,473	6.80	+2.49
Turnout		95,221	72.54	−14.00
Two-party-preferred result
Liberal National	Cameron Caldwell	56,224	63.35	+2.72
Labor	Letitia Del Fabbro	32,524	36.65	–2.72
Liberal National hold		Swing	+2.72	

==== 2022 ====
2022 Australian federal election: Fadden
Party	Candidate	Votes	%	±%
Liberal National	Stuart Robert	47,190	44.62	−4.10
Labor	Letitia Del Fabbro	23,638	22.35	−0.16
Greens	Sally Spain	11,353	10.73	+1.73
One Nation	Sandy Roach	9,177	8.68	+0.11
United Australia	Nathan O'Brien	7,014	6.63	+1.52
Independent	Stewart Brooker	4,407	4.17	+4.17
Liberal Democrats	Alex Forbes	2,992	2.83	−1.69
Total formal votes		105,771	95.69	+0.60
Informal votes		4,760	4.31	−0.60
Turnout		110,531	86.54	−3.09
Two-party-preferred result
Liberal National	Stuart Robert	64,126	60.63	−3.55
Labor	Letitia Del Fabbro	41,645	39.37	+3.55
Liberal National hold		Swing	−3.55	

Alluvial diagram for preference flows in the seat of Fadden in the 2022 federal election. indicates at what stage the winning candidate had over 50% of the votes and was declared the winner.

=== Elections in the 2010s ===
==== 2019 ====
2019 Australian federal election: Fadden
Party	Candidate	Votes	%	±%
Liberal National	Stuart Robert	47,359	48.72	−0.67
Labor	Luz Stanton	21,882	22.51	−3.48
Greens	Scott Turner	8,747	9.00	+1.39
One Nation	Darren Eather	8,334	8.57	−3.40
United Australia	Mara Krischker	4,968	5.11	+5.11
Liberal Democrats	Jake Welch	4,391	4.52	+4.52
Conservative National	Allan Barber	1,531	1.57	+1.57
Total formal votes		97,212	95.09	−0.42
Informal votes		5,019	4.91	+0.42
Turnout		102,231	89.63	+1.59
Two-party-preferred result
Liberal National	Stuart Robert	62,387	64.18	+2.94
Labor	Luz Stanton	34,825	35.82	−2.94
Liberal National hold		Swing	+2.94	

==== 2016 ====
2016 Australian federal election: Fadden
Party	Candidate	Votes	%	±%
Liberal National	Stuart Robert	43,938	49.15	−4.46
Labor	Meaghan Scanlon	23,369	26.14	+3.92
One Nation	Brenden Ball	10,693	11.96	+11.32
Greens	Daniel Kwon	6,871	7.69	+2.70
Family First	Lyn Rees	3,450	3.86	+2.23
Defence Veterans	Sean Macnamara	1,083	1.21	+1.21
Total formal votes		89,404	95.47	+1.26
Informal votes		4,243	4.53	−1.26
Turnout		93,647	89.43	−3.27
Two-party-preferred result
Liberal National	Stuart Robert	54,578	61.05	−3.31
Labor	Meaghan Scanlon	34,826	38.95	+3.31
Liberal National hold		Swing	−3.31	

==== 2013 ====
2013 Australian federal election: Fadden
Party	Candidate	Votes	%	±%
Liberal National	Stuart Robert	42,962	53.61	−4.72
Labor	Nicole Lessio	17,804	22.22	−5.11
Palmer United	Jim Macanally	11,759	14.67	+14.67
Greens	Petrina Maizey	3,995	4.99	−4.34
Family First	Jeremy Fredericks	1,305	1.63	−1.78
Katter's Australian	Billy Lawrence	1,088	1.36	+1.36
Independent	Maurie Carroll	712	0.89	+0.89
One Nation	Stewart Boyd	510	0.64	−0.96
Total formal votes		80,135	94.21	+0.25
Informal votes		4,925	5.79	−0.25
Turnout		85,060	92.70	+0.80
Two-party-preferred result
Liberal National	Stuart Robert	51,572	64.36	+0.17
Labor	Nicole Lessio	28,563	35.64	−0.17
Liberal National hold		Swing	+0.17	

==== 2010 ====
2010 Australian federal election: Fadden
Party	Candidate	Votes	%	±%
Liberal National	Stuart Robert	42,925	58.33	+1.72
Labor	Rana Watson	20,110	27.33	−6.24
Greens	Graeme Maizey	6,863	9.33	+4.92
Family First	Barrie Nicholson	2,513	3.41	+1.36
One Nation	Ian Rossiter	1,181	1.60	+0.79
Total formal votes		73,592	93.96	−1.73
Informal votes		4,734	6.04	+1.73
Turnout		78,326	91.89	−0.35
Two-party-preferred result
Liberal National	Stuart Robert	47,236	64.19	+3.76
Labor	Rana Watson	26,356	35.81	−3.76
Liberal National hold		Swing	+3.76	

=== Elections in the 2000s ===
==== 2007 ====
2007 Australian federal election: Fadden
Party	Candidate	Votes	%	±%
Liberal	Stuart Robert	40,813	48.92	−11.17
Labor	Rana Watson	28,106	33.69	+6.14
National	Alex Douglas	6,177	7.40	+7.40
Greens	Michael Beale	3,748	4.49	+0.36
Family First	Ross Wilson	1,743	2.09	−1.73
Independent	David Montgomery	1,065	1.28	+1.28
One Nation	John Walter	695	0.83	−1.23
Citizens Electoral Council	Ken Martin	582	0.70	−0.09
Democrats	Chris Faint	504	0.60	−0.94
Total formal votes		83,433	95.69	+1.80
Informal votes		3,754	4.31	−1.80
Turnout		87,187	93.84	+0.08
Two-party-preferred result
Liberal	Stuart Robert	50,288	60.20	−5.70
Labor	Rana Watson	33,205	39.80	+5.70
Liberal hold		Swing	−5.70	

==== 2004 ====
2004 Australian federal election: Fadden
Party	Candidate	Votes	%	±%
Liberal	David Jull	42,328	59.56	+6.18
Labor	Peter Eather	19,919	28.03	+0.04
Greens	Willy Bach	3,011	4.24	+0.96
Family First	Lyn Rees	2,680	3.77	+3.77
One Nation	John Walter	1,428	2.01	−5.22
Democrats	Suzanne Wilson	1,109	1.56	−2.65
Citizens Electoral Council	Ken Martin	598	0.84	+0.84
Total formal votes		71,073	93.83	+0.27
Informal votes		4,672	6.17	−0.27
Turnout		75,745	92.21	+1.90
Two-party-preferred result
Liberal	David Jull	46,393	65.28	+2.16
Labor	Peter Eather	24,680	34.72	−2.16
Liberal hold		Swing	+2.16	

==== 2001 ====
2001 Australian federal election: Fadden
Party	Candidate	Votes	%	±%
Liberal	David Jull	42,856	55.80	+8.31
Labor	Ray Merlehan	23,434	30.51	−0.68
One Nation	Chris Coyle	4,897	6.38	−6.42
Democrats	Neil Cotter	3,308	4.31	−0.20
Greens	Julian Woolford	2,305	3.00	+0.96
Total formal votes		76,800	94.46	−2.15
Informal votes		4,501	5.54	+2.15
Turnout		81,301	95.07	
Two-party-preferred result
Liberal	David Jull	47,838	62.29	+4.70
Labor	Ray Merlehan	28,962	37.71	−4.70
Liberal hold		Swing	+4.70	

=== Elections in the 1990s ===
==== 1998 ====
1998 Australian federal election: Fadden
Party	Candidate	Votes	%	±%
Liberal	David Jull	34,195	47.49	−12.93
Labor	Mike Smith	22,460	31.19	+4.94
One Nation	Neil Pitt	9,213	12.79	+12.79
Democrats	Neil Cotter	3,248	4.51	−5.30
Greens	Fay Smith	1,472	2.04	−0.48
Christian Democrats	John McGuigan	1,418	1.97	+1.96
Total formal votes		72,006	96.62	−0.91
Informal votes		2,521	3.38	+0.91
Turnout		74,527	93.64	−1.18
Two-party-preferred result
Liberal	David Jull	41,466	57.59	−9.96
Labor	Mike Smith	30,540	42.41	+9.96
Liberal hold		Swing	−9.96	

==== 1996 ====
1996 Australian federal election: Fadden
Party	Candidate	Votes	%	±%
Liberal	David Jull	42,977	60.84	+13.42
Labor	Ray Merlehan	18,349	25.98	−10.52
Democrats	Hetty Johnston	6,937	9.82	+5.37
Greens	William Gabriel	1,729	2.45	−1.75
Indigenous Peoples	Dulcie May Bronsch	642	0.91	+0.70
Total formal votes		70,634	97.57	+0.14
Informal votes		1,762	2.43	−0.14
Turnout		72,396	94.82	−0.60
Two-party-preferred result
Liberal	David Jull	47,796	67.84	+12.68
Labor	Ray Merlehan	22,662	32.16	−12.68
Liberal hold		Swing	+12.68	

==== 1993 ====
1993 Australian federal election: Fadden
Party	Candidate	Votes	%	±%
Liberal	David Jull	30,581	45.27	+0.76
Labor	Peter Eldon	25,973	38.45	+1.51
Democrats	Leonie Sanders	3,381	5.00	−8.55
National	Iona Abrahamson	3,200	4.74	+0.36
Greens	Harry Darville	3,020	4.47	+4.47
Confederate Action	Joe Ross	1,010	1.50	+1.50
Indigenous Peoples	Shaun Matheson	212	0.31	+0.31
Natural Law	Otto Kuhne	177	0.26	+0.26
Total formal votes		67,554	97.26	−0.47
Informal votes		1,901	2.74	+0.47
Turnout		69,455	95.42	
Two-party-preferred result
Liberal	David Jull	36,297	53.77	−0.75
Labor	Peter Eldon	31,205	46.23	+0.75
Liberal hold		Swing	−0.75	

==== 1990 ====
1990 Australian federal election: Fadden
Party	Candidate	Votes	%	±%
Liberal	David Jull	28,361	43.9	+8.1
Labor	Marie Wilkinson	24,388	37.8	−3.4
Democrats	Eugene Cross	8,641	13.4	+6.6
National	Peter Freckleton	2,354	3.6	−12.5
Independent	Richard Heymann	794	1.2	+1.2
Total formal votes		64,538	97.8	
Informal votes		1,438	2.2	
Turnout		66,021	95.3	
Two-party-preferred result
Liberal	David Jull	34,621	53.8	−0.6
Labor	Marie Wilkinson	29,766	46.2	+0.6
Liberal hold		Swing	−0.6	

=== Elections in the 1980s ===
==== 1987 ====
1987 Australian federal election: Fadden
Party	Candidate	Votes	%	±%
Labor	Peter Wilson	24,481	41.2	+0.6
Liberal	David Jull	21,258	35.8	−0.4
National	Peter Robinson	9,581	16.1	−0.6
Democrats	Kenneth Davies	4,065	6.8	+0.4
Total formal votes		59,385	96.6	
Informal votes		2,084	3.4	
Turnout		61,469	93.2	
Two-party-preferred result
Liberal	David Jull	32,311	54.4	−0.3
Labor	Peter Wilson	27,074	45.6	+0.3
Liberal hold		Swing	−0.3	

==== 1984 ====
1984 Australian federal election: Fadden
Party	Candidate	Votes	%	±%
Labor	Peter Wilson	21,335	40.7	−4.1
Liberal	David Jull	18,938	36.2	−6.1
National	Alun Preece	8,738	16.7	+8.8
Democrats	Janice Barber	3,354	6.4	+2.3
Total formal votes		52,365	95.6	
Informal votes		2,430	4.4	
Turnout		54,795	92.9	
Two-party-preferred result
Liberal	David Jull	28,647	54.7	+2.9
Labor	Peter Wilson	23,718	45.3	−2.9
Liberal hold		Swing	+2.9	

==== 1983 ====
1983 Australian federal election: Fadden
Party	Candidate	Votes	%	±%
Labor	David Beddall	44,412	48.3	+4.7
Liberal	Don Cameron	35,692	38.8	−9.2
National	Howard Edmunds	7,251	7.9	+7.9
Democrats	Murray Hallam	3,806	4.1	−3.4
Socialist	Raymond Ferguson	505	0.5	+0.5
Progress	Dallas Graham	276	0.3	−0.5
Total formal votes		91,942	98.4	
Informal votes		1,476	1.6	
Turnout		93,418	92.6	
Two-party-preferred result
Labor	David Beddall		51.7	+3.1
Liberal	Don Cameron		48.3	−3.1
Labor gain from Liberal		Swing	+3.1	

==== 1980 ====
1980 Australian federal election: Fadden
Party	Candidate	Votes	%	±%
Liberal	Don Cameron	37,170	48.0	+14.4
Labor	David Beddall	33,736	43.6	+5.2
Democrats	Janice Barber	5,812	7.5	−1.4
Progress	Dallas Graham	648	0.8	+0.5
Total formal votes		77,366	98.1	
Informal votes		1,506	1.9	
Turnout		78,872	94.0	
Two-party-preferred result
Liberal	Don Cameron	39,808	51.5	−4.5
Labor	David Beddall	37,558	48.5	+4.5
Liberal hold		Swing	−4.5	

=== Elections in the 1970s ===
==== 1977 ====
1977 Australian federal election: Fadden
Party	Candidate	Votes	%	±%
Labor	Clem Jones	23,869	38.4	+2.6
Liberal	Don Cameron	20,909	33.6	−22.3
National Country	James Shapcott	10,910	17.5	+12.5
Democrats	Janice Barber	5,559	8.9	+8.9
Independent	Melody Bond	717	1.2	+1.2
Progress	Peter Gautrey	206	0.3	+0.3
Total formal votes		62,170	97.9	
Informal votes		1,322	2.1	
Turnout		63,492	94.8	
Two-party-preferred result
Liberal	Don Cameron	34,811	56.0	−6.5
Labor	Clem Jones	27,359	44.0	+6.5
Liberal notional hold		Swing	−6.5	
