= Results of the 1984 Australian federal election in Queensland =

1984 Australian federal election (Queensland)
| ← 1983 | 1 December 1984 | 1987 → |

All 24 Queensland seats in the Australian House of Representatives and 7 seats in the Australian Senate
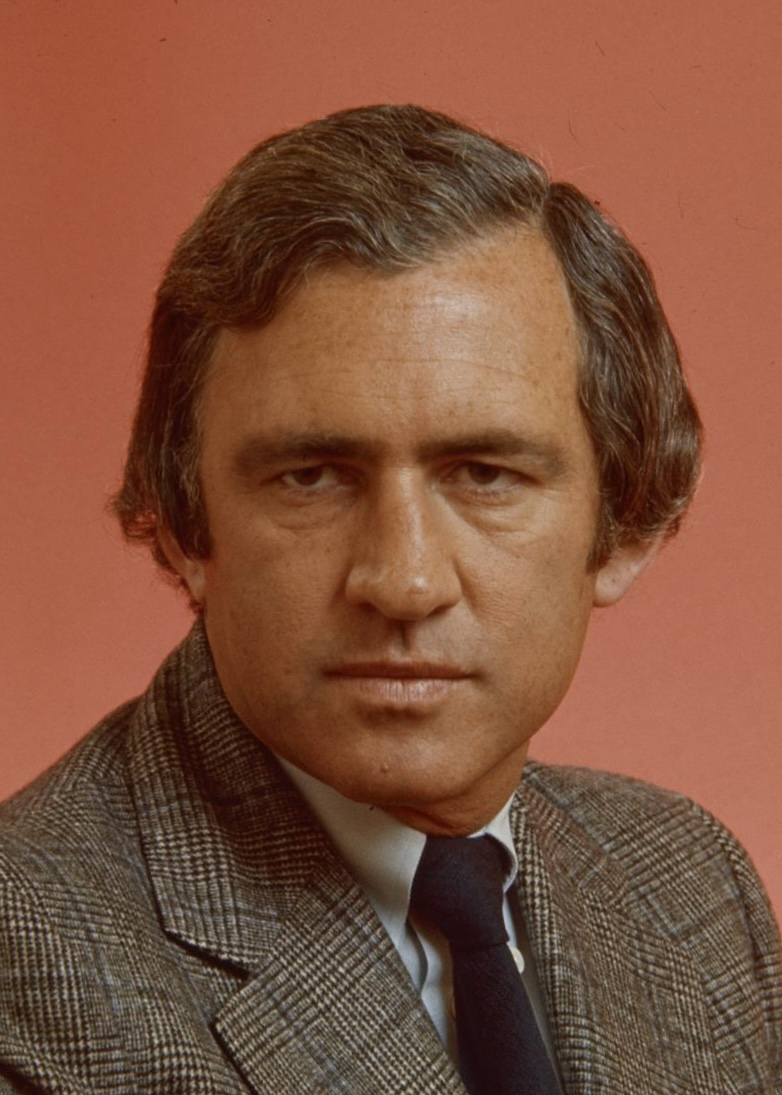

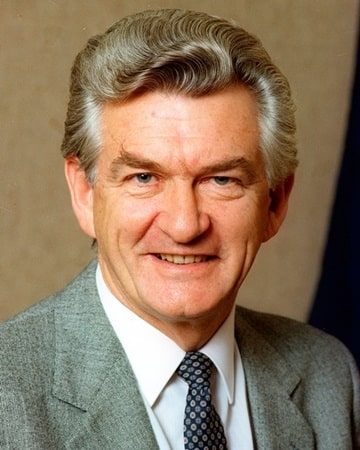
| | First party | Second party |
|---|---|---|
| Leader | Andrew Peacock | Bob Hawke |
| Party | Liberal/National coalition | Labor |
| Last election | 9 | 10 seats |
| Seats won | 15 seats | 9 seats |
| Seat change | ▲6 | ▼1 |
| Popular vote | 699,350 | 605,804 |
| Percentage | 50.9% | 44.1% |
| Swing | ▲3.2 | ▲1.3 |
| TPP | 52.29% | 47.71 |
| TPP swing | ▼2.26 | ▲2.26 |

This is a list of electoral division results for the Australian 1984 federal election in the state of Queensland.

== Overall results ==
Turnout 95.1% (CV) — Informal 8.2%
| Party | Votes | % | Swing | Seats | Change |
|---|---|---|---|---|---|
| National | 435,832 | 31.70 | +7.95 | 8 | ▲2 |
| Liberal | 263,518 | 19.16 | –5.24 | 7 | ▲4 |
| Liberal/National Coalition | 699,350 | 50.86 | 2.72 | 15 | ▲6 |
| Labor | 605,813 | 44.06 | –2.08 | 9 | ▼1 |
| Democrats | 66,243 | 4.82 | +0.17 | | |
| Independent | 3,043 | 0.22 | –0.13 | | |
| Socialist Workers | 592 | 0.04 | –0.22 | | |
| Total | 1,375,040 | | | 24 | ▲5 |
Two-party-preferred vote
| Liberal/National Coalition | 718,873 | 52.29 | –2.26 | 15 | ▲6 |
| Labor | 656,029 | 47.71 | +2.26 | 9 | ▼1 |
| Invalid/blank votes | 65,803 | 4.6 | +1.3 | | |
| Turnout | 1,440,843 | 92.7 | | | |
| Registered voters | 1,555,600 | | | | |
Source: Federal Election Results 1949-1993

== Results by division ==
=== Bowman ===
1984 Australian federal election: Bowman
| Party | Candidate | Votes | % | ±% |
|---|---|---|---|---|
| Labor | Len Keogh | 29,312 | 51.6 | −1.6 |
| Liberal | Leo White | 12,378 | 21.8 | −15.0 |
| National | Noel Willersdorf | 11,443 | 20.1 | +14.1 |
| Democrats | Ronald Heindorff | 3,691 | 6.5 | +2.5 |
| Total formal votes | | 56,824 | 95.3 | |
| Informal votes | | 2,826 | 4.7 | |
| Turnout | | 59,650 | 93.8 | |
Two-party-preferred result
| Labor | Len Keogh | 31,444 | 55.3 | −0.4 |
| Liberal | Leo White | 25,380 | 44.7 | +0.4 |
| Labor hold | | Swing | −0.4 | |

=== Brisbane ===
1984 Australian federal election: Brisbane
| Party | Candidate | Votes | % | ±% |
|---|---|---|---|---|
| Labor | Manfred Cross | 30,391 | 50.3 | +0.5 |
| Liberal | Ian Douglas | 16,918 | 28.0 | −5.4 |
| National | William Owen | 9,370 | 15.5 | +6.8 |
| Democrats | George Leigh | 3,764 | 6.2 | +0.7 |
| Total formal votes | | 60,443 | 95.5 | |
| Informal votes | | 2,816 | 4.5 | |
| Turnout | | 63,259 | 92.2 | |
Two-party-preferred result
| Labor | Manfred Cross | 32,841 | 54.3 | −2.0 |
| Liberal | Ian Douglas | 27,588 | 45.7 | +2.0 |
| Labor hold | | Swing | −2.0 | |

=== Capricornia ===
1984 Australian federal election: Capricornia
| Party | Candidate | Votes | % | ±% |
|---|---|---|---|---|
| Labor | Keith Wright | 29,936 | 50.9 | +0.1 |
| National | Colin Webber | 21,539 | 36.6 | +7.6 |
| Liberal | Alan Agnew | 5,385 | 9.1 | −7.9 |
| Democrats | Peter Knack | 1,588 | 2.7 | −0.1 |
| Independent | Eric Geissmann | 416 | 0.7 | +0.7 |
| Total formal votes | | 58,864 | 96.7 | |
| Informal votes | | 2,019 | 3.3 | |
| Turnout | | 60,883 | 94.0 | |
Two-party-preferred result
| Labor | Keith Wright | 31,925 | 54.2 | −2.1 |
| National | Colin Webber | 26,934 | 45.8 | +2.1 |
| Labor hold | | Swing | −2.1 | |

=== Dawson ===
1984 Australian federal election: Dawson
| Party | Candidate | Votes | % | ±% |
|---|---|---|---|---|
| National | Ray Braithwaite | 31,299 | 52.1 | +1.2 |
| Labor | John Bird | 26,832 | 44.7 | −2.5 |
| Democrats | Antony Lucas | 1,913 | 3.2 | +3.2 |
| Total formal votes | | 60,035 | 95.7 | |
| Informal votes | | 2,674 | 4.3 | |
| Turnout | | 62,709 | 93.3 | |
Two-party-preferred result
| National | Ray Braithwaite | 32,306 | 53.8 | +2.0 |
| Labor | John Bird | 27,729 | 46.2 | −2.0 |
| National hold | | Swing | +2.0 | |

=== Fadden ===
1984 Australian federal election: Fadden
| Party | Candidate | Votes | % | ±% |
|---|---|---|---|---|
| Labor | Peter Wilson | 21,335 | 40.7 | −4.1 |
| Liberal | David Jull | 18,938 | 36.2 | −6.1 |
| National | Alun Preece | 8,738 | 16.7 | +8.8 |
| Democrats | Janice Barber | 3,354 | 6.4 | +2.3 |
| Total formal votes | | 52,365 | 95.6 | |
| Informal votes | | 2,430 | 4.4 | |
| Turnout | | 54,795 | 92.9 | |
Two-party-preferred result
| Liberal | David Jull | 28,647 | 54.7 | +2.9 |
| Labor | Peter Wilson | 23,718 | 45.3 | −2.9 |
| Liberal hold | | Swing | +2.9 | |

=== Fairfax ===
1984 Australian federal election: Fairfax
| Party | Candidate | Votes | % | ±% |
|---|---|---|---|---|
| National | Evan Adermann | 23,593 | 45.2 | −1.9 |
| Labor | Peter Shooter | 17,607 | 33.7 | −0.2 |
| Liberal | Terry Welch | 7,402 | 14.2 | +2.8 |
| Democrats | Bob Borsellino | 3,608 | 6.9 | +0.0 |
| Total formal votes | | 52,210 | 95.0 | |
| Informal votes | | 2,728 | 5.0 | |
| Turnout | | 54,938 | 92.5 | |
Two-party-preferred result
| National | Evan Adermann | 31,642 | 60.6 | −0.4 |
| Labor | Peter Shooter | 20,564 | 39.4 | +0.4 |
| National notional hold | | Swing | −0.4 | |

=== Fisher ===
1984 Australian federal election: Fisher
| Party | Candidate | Votes | % | ±% |
|---|---|---|---|---|
| Labor | Garth Head | 23,554 | 42.4 | +0.7 |
| National | Peter Slipper | 20,214 | 36.4 | +0.0 |
| Liberal | Lionel Kilner | 7,998 | 14.4 | −0.1 |
| Democrats | Kent Farrell | 3,807 | 6.9 | −0.4 |
| Total formal votes | | 55,573 | 95.1 | |
| Informal votes | | 2,889 | 4.9 | |
| Turnout | | 58,462 | 94.6 | |
Two-party-preferred result
| National | Peter Slipper | 29,061 | 52.3 | −1.3 |
| Labor | Garth Head | 26,505 | 47.7 | +1.3 |
| National hold | | Swing | −1.3 | |

=== Forde ===
1984 Australian federal election: Forde
| Party | Candidate | Votes | % | ±% |
|---|---|---|---|---|
| Labor | Hamish Linacre | 23,573 | 44.9 | −2.7 |
| Liberal | David Watson | 16,707 | 31.8 | −9.9 |
| National | Francis Gaffy | 8,675 | 16.5 | +13.2 |
| Democrats | Michael Coogan | 3,564 | 6.8 | −0.8 |
| Total formal votes | | 52,519 | 94.8 | |
| Informal votes | | 2,909 | 5.2 | |
| Turnout | | 55,428 | 92.0 | |
Two-party-preferred result
| Liberal | David Watson | 26,272 | 50.0 | +2.7 |
| Labor | Hamish Linacre | 26,229 | 50.0 | −2.7 |
| Liberal notional gain from Labor | | Swing | +2.7 | |

=== Griffith ===
1984 Australian federal election: Griffith
| Party | Candidate | Votes | % | ±% |
|---|---|---|---|---|
| Labor | Ben Humphreys | 31,786 | 54.4 | +0.0 |
| Liberal | Kaylene Low | 13,519 | 23.1 | −13.3 |
| National | Sean Cousins | 9,521 | 16.3 | +16.3 |
| Democrats | Daniel Roth | 2,996 | 5.1 | −1.6 |
| Socialist Workers | Helen Jones | 592 | 1.0 | −0.1 |
| Total formal votes | | 58,414 | 93.6 | |
| Informal votes | | 4,024 | 6.4 | |
| Turnout | | 62,438 | 89.1 | |
Two-party-preferred result
| Labor | Ben Humphreys | 35,199 | 60.3 | −0.7 |
| Liberal | Kaylene Low | 23,203 | 39.7 | +0.7 |
| Labor hold | | Swing | −0.7 | |

=== Groom ===
1984 Australian federal election: Groom
| Party | Candidate | Votes | % | ±% |
|---|---|---|---|---|
| National | Tom McVeigh | 34,047 | 56.0 | −4.9 |
| Labor | Ronald Cullin | 19,142 | 31.5 | −1.9 |
| Liberal | Alexander Munro | 5,417 | 8.9 | +8.9 |
| Democrats | Raymond Dow | 2,160 | 3.6 | −2.1 |
| Total formal votes | | 60,766 | 97.6 | |
| Informal votes | | 2,389 | 2.4 | |
| Turnout | | 63,155 | 94.4 | |
Two-party-preferred result
| National | Tom McVeigh | 40,052 | 65.9 | +2.7 |
| Labor | Ronald Cullin | 20,714 | 34.1 | −2.7 |
| National notional hold | | Swing | +2.7 | |

=== Herbert ===
1984 Australian federal election: Herbert
| Party | Candidate | Votes | % | ±% |
|---|---|---|---|---|
| Labor | Ted Lindsay | 29,589 | 50.3 | −0.2 |
| National | Vicky Kippin | 18,602 | 31.6 | +18.0 |
| Liberal | Theo Theofanes | 8,326 | 14.2 | −19.4 |
| Democrats | Ana Bristowe-Lamb | 2,273 | 3.9 | +1.6 |
| Total formal votes | | 58,790 | 96.3 | |
| Informal votes | | 2,286 | 3.7 | |
| Turnout | | 61,076 | 90.6 | |
Two-party-preferred result
| Labor | Ted Lindsay | 31,517 | 53.6 | +0.5 |
| National | Vicky Kippin | 27,270 | 46.4 | +46.4 |
| Labor hold | | Swing | +0.5 | |

=== Hinkler ===
1984 Australian federal election: Hinkler
| Party | Candidate | Votes | % | ±% |
|---|---|---|---|---|
| Labor | Brian Courtice | 27,981 | 47.1 | −0.8 |
| National | Bryan Conquest | 25,856 | 43.5 | +1.2 |
| Liberal | Ronald Owen | 2,940 | 5.0 | +0.0 |
| Democrats | Frank Coulthard | 2,322 | 3.9 | +0.3 |
| Independent | Marcus Platen | 287 | 0.5 | +0.5 |
| Total formal votes | | 59,386 | 96.2 | |
| Informal votes | | 2,319 | 3.8 | |
| Turnout | | 61,705 | 94.0 | |
Two-party-preferred result
| National | Bryan Conquest | 29,798 | 50.2 | +0.8 |
| Labor | Brian Courtice | 29,577 | 49.8 | −0.8 |
| National gain from Labor | | Swing | +0.8 | |

=== Kennedy ===
1984 Australian federal election: Kennedy
| Party | Candidate | Votes | % | ±% |
|---|---|---|---|---|
| National | Bob Katter, Sr. | 29,323 | 50.3 | +0.3 |
| Labor | Brigid Walsh | 25,033 | 42.9 | −2.3 |
| Liberal | Gerald Porter | 2,358 | 4.0 | +4.0 |
| Democrats | Lance Winter | 1,586 | 2.7 | −2.1 |
| Total formal votes | | 58,300 | 94.6 | |
| Informal votes | | 3,319 | 5.4 | |
| Turnout | | 61,619 | 90.6 | |
Two-party-preferred result
| National | Bob Katter, Sr. | 32,169 | 55.2 | +2.7 |
| Labor | Brigid Walsh | 26,126 | 44.8 | −2.7 |
| National hold | | Swing | +2.7 | |

=== Leichhardt ===
1984 Australian federal election: Leichhardt
| Party | Candidate | Votes | % | ±% |
|---|---|---|---|---|
| Labor | John Gayler | 28,256 | 51.0 | −1.6 |
| National | Eda Celledoni | 20,115 | 36.3 | −11.1 |
| Liberal | Hugh Anthony | 3,879 | 7.0 | +7.0 |
| Democrats | Cliff Truelove | 2,675 | 4.8 | +4.8 |
| Independent | Daas Saba | 463 | 0.8 | +0.8 |
| Total formal votes | | 55,388 | 94.3 | |
| Informal votes | | 3,334 | 5.7 | |
| Turnout | | 58,722 | 91.9 | |
Two-party-preferred result
| Labor | John Gayler | 30,726 | 55.5 | +2.9 |
| National | Eva Celledoni | 24,662 | 44.5 | −2.9 |
| Labor hold | | Swing | +2.9 | |

=== Lilley ===
1984 Australian federal election: Lilley
| Party | Candidate | Votes | % | ±% |
|---|---|---|---|---|
| Labor | Elaine Darling | 33,348 | 54.5 | −2.3 |
| Liberal | Ian Parminter | 15,102 | 24.7 | −15.0 |
| National | John Frew | 11,958 | 19.5 | +19.5 |
| Independent | Anthony Catip | 821 | 1.3 | +0.7 |
| Total formal votes | | 61,229 | 95.1 | |
| Informal votes | | 3,183 | 4.9 | |
| Turnout | | 64,412 | 92.5 | |
Two-party-preferred result
| Labor | Elaine Darling | 34,085 | 55.7 | −3.1 |
| Liberal | Ian Parminter | 27,127 | 44.3 | +3.1 |
| Labor hold | | Swing | −3.1 | |

=== Maranoa ===
1984 Australian federal election: Maranoa
| Party | Candidate | Votes | % | ±% |
|---|---|---|---|---|
| National | Ian Cameron | 38,132 | 62.9 | +2.6 |
| Labor | Dave Summers | 19,084 | 31.5 | −1.4 |
| Democrats | Mike Brannigan | 3,384 | 5.6 | −1.2 |
| Total formal votes | | 60,600 | 95.1 | |
| Informal votes | | 3,121 | 4.9 | |
| Turnout | | 63,721 | 93.6 | |
Two-party-preferred result
| National | Ian Cameron | 39,690 | 65.5 | +1.9 |
| Labor | Dave Summers | 20,910 | 34.5 | −1.9 |
| National hold | | Swing | +1.9 | |

=== McPherson ===
1984 Australian federal election: McPherson
| Party | Candidate | Votes | % | ±% |
|---|---|---|---|---|
| Liberal | Peter White | 22,437 | 39.8 | +3.3 |
| Labor | Rupe Granrott | 18,156 | 32.2 | −1.0 |
| National | Warren Tapp | 13,072 | 23.2 | −0.3 |
| Democrats | Ken Peterson | 2,398 | 4.3 | −0.6 |
| Independent | Maria Parer | 321 | 0.6 | +0.6 |
| Total formal votes | | 56,384 | 94.7 | |
| Informal votes | | 3,157 | 5.3 | |
| Turnout | | 59,541 | 91.5 | |
Two-party-preferred result
| Liberal | Peter White | 35,820 | 63.5 | +2.6 |
| Labor | Rupe Granrott | 20,564 | 36.5 | −2.6 |
| Liberal hold | | Swing | +2.6 | |

=== Moncrieff ===
1984 Australian federal election: Moncrieff
| Party | Candidate | Votes | % | ±% |
|---|---|---|---|---|
| Labor | Athol Paterson | 18,847 | 36.0 | −1.5 |
| Liberal | Kathy Martin | 16,194 | 30.9 | −5.8 |
| National | Judy Gamin | 14,609 | 27.9 | +8.4 |
| Democrats | Susan Mulley | 1,958 | 3.7 | −0.5 |
| Independent | Will Aabraham-Steer | 471 | 0.9 | +0.9 |
| Independent | Peter Courtney | 264 | 0.5 | +0.5 |
| Total formal votes | | 52,343 | 94.4 | |
| Informal votes | | 3,120 | 5.6 | |
| Turnout | | 55,463 | 91.5 | |
Two-party-preferred result
| Liberal | Kathy Martin | 31,332 | 59.9 | +3.0 |
| Labor | Athol Paterson | 21,011 | 40.1 | −3.0 |
| Liberal hold | | Swing | +3.0 | |

=== Moreton ===
1984 Australian federal election: Moreton
| Party | Candidate | Votes | % | ±% |
|---|---|---|---|---|
| Labor | Michael Kinnane | 26,441 | 43.5 | −3.1 |
| Liberal | Don Cameron | 25,875 | 42.6 | −3.0 |
| National | Howard Baskerville | 5,534 | 9.1 | +9.1 |
| Democrats | Geoffrey Fawthrop | 2,956 | 4.9 | −1.8 |
| Total formal votes | | 60,806 | 95.9 | |
| Informal votes | | 2,578 | 4.1 | |
| Turnout | | 63,384 | 94.0 | |
Two-party-preferred result
| Liberal | Don Cameron | 32,381 | 53.3 | +2.8 |
| Labor | Michael Kinnane | 28,419 | 46.7 | −2.8 |
| Liberal hold | | Swing | +2.8 | |

=== Oxley ===
1984 Australian federal election: Oxley
| Party | Candidate | Votes | % | ±% |
|---|---|---|---|---|
| Labor | Bill Hayden | 32,921 | 59.5 | −5.0 |
| National | Charles Groves | 10,537 | 19.0 | +19.0 |
| Liberal | Les Woodforth | 9,292 | 16.8 | −12.9 |
| Democrats | George Hannaford | 2,621 | 4.7 | −0.3 |
| Total formal votes | | 55,371 | 95.4 | |
| Informal votes | | 2,655 | 4.6 | |
| Turnout | | 58,026 | 93.8 | |
Two-party-preferred result
| Labor | Bill Hayden | 34,903 | 63.0 | −5.3 |
| National | Charles Groves | 20,474 | 37.0 | +37.0 |
| Labor hold | | Swing | −5.3 | |

=== Petrie ===
1984 Australian federal election: Petrie
| Party | Candidate | Votes | % | ±% |
|---|---|---|---|---|
| Labor | Deane Wells | 28,392 | 46.2 | −1.8 |
| Liberal | John Hodges | 20,395 | 33.2 | −9.9 |
| National | Don Munro | 9,701 | 15.8 | +15.8 |
| Democrats | Garry Somerville | 2,971 | 4.8 | −1.6 |
| Total formal votes | | 61,459 | 95.5 | |
| Informal votes | | 2,879 | 4.5 | |
| Turnout | | 64,338 | 94.1 | |
Two-party-preferred result
| Liberal | John Hodges | 31,115 | 50.6 | +2.1 |
| Labor | Deane Wells | 30,339 | 49.4 | −2.1 |
| Liberal gain from Labor | | Swing | +2.1 | |

=== Rankin ===
1984 Australian federal election: Rankin
| Party | Candidate | Votes | % | ±% |
|---|---|---|---|---|
| Labor | David Beddall | 23,820 | 46.7 | −3.9 |
| National | Cec Jamieson | 16,998 | 33.3 | +12.7 |
| Liberal | Bruce Mackenzie-Forbes | 7,324 | 14.4 | −8.5 |
| Democrats | Bev Peereboom | 2,880 | 5.6 | +0.7 |
| Total formal votes | | 51,022 | 94.2 | |
| Informal votes | | 3,150 | 5.8 | |
| Turnout | | 54,172 | 91.8 | |
Two-party-preferred result
| Labor | David Beddall | 25,807 | 50.6 | −4.6 |
| National | Cec Jamieson | 25,199 | 49.4 | +49.4 |
| Labor hold | | Swing | −4.6 | |

=== Ryan ===
1984 Australian federal election: Ryan
| Party | Candidate | Votes | % | ±% |
|---|---|---|---|---|
| Liberal | John Moore | 24,734 | 40.7 | −12.2 |
| Labor | Mike Foley | 20,644 | 34.0 | −1.8 |
| National | Maxwell Crofts | 10,300 | 17.0 | +17.0 |
| Democrats | John Peeters | 5,029 | 8.3 | −0.1 |
| Total formal votes | | 60,707 | 97.1 | |
| Informal votes | | 1,839 | 2.9 | |
| Turnout | | 62,546 | 92.7 | |
Two-party-preferred result
| Liberal | John Moore | 36,641 | 60.4 | +3.1 |
| Labor | Mike Foley | 24,053 | 39.6 | −3.1 |
| Liberal hold | | Swing | +3.1 | |

=== Wide Bay ===
1984 Australian federal election: Wide Bay
| Party | Candidate | Votes | % | ±% |
|---|---|---|---|---|
| National | Clarrie Millar | 32,656 | 59.1 | +4.2 |
| Labor | Fred Hoberg | 19,833 | 35.9 | −2.7 |
| Democrats | Glen Spicer | 2,745 | 5.0 | +1.1 |
| Total formal votes | | 55,234 | 94.9 | |
| Informal votes | | 2,942 | 5.1 | |
| Turnout | | 58,176 | 94.4 | |
Two-party-preferred result
| National | Clarrie Millar | 34,110 | 61.8 | +3.9 |
| Labor | Fred Hoberg | 21,124 | 38.2 | −3.9 |
| National hold | | Swing | +3.9 | |

== See also ==
- Results of the 1984 Australian federal election (House of Representatives)
- Members of the Australian House of Representatives, 1984–1987
