= Results of the 1993 Australian federal election in Queensland =

1993 Australian federal election (Queensland)
- 13 March 1993

All 25 Queensland seats in the Australian House of Representatives and 6 seats in the Australian Senate

	First party	Second party
Leader	John Hewson	Paul Keating
Party	Liberal/National coalition	Labor
Last election	9 seats	15
Seats won	12 seats	13 seats
Seat change	▲3	▼2
Popular vote	840,378	739,862
Percentage	46.0%	40.5%
Swing	▲0.7	▼1.1
TPP	51.57%	48.43%
TPP swing	▲0.89	▼0.89

This is a list of electoral division results for the Australian 1993 federal election in the state of Queensland.

== Overall results ==
Turnout 96.3% (CV) — Informal 2.8%
Party	Votes	%	Swing	Seats	Change
Liberal	571,226	31.26	2.75	7	▲1
National	269,152	14.73	-2.03	5	▲2
Liberal/National Coalition	840,378	45.99	0.72	12	▲3
Labor	739,862	40.49	-1.10	13	▼2
Democrats	74,278	4.06	-7.53		
Greens	58,502	3.20	2.60		
Independent	52,391	2.87	2.18		
Confederate Action	51,565	2.82	0.00		
Indigenous Peoples	4,069	0.22	0.00		
Natural Law	3,547	0.19	0.00		
Citizens Electoral Council	2,732	0.15	0.00		
Total	1,827,324			25	▲1
Two-party-preferred vote
Labor	884,426	48.43	-0.89	13	▼2
Liberal/National Coalition	941,709	51.57	0.89	12	▲3
Invalid/blank votes	49,135	2.62	0.39		
Turnout	1,876,459	95.17			
Registered voters	1,971,729				
Source: Federal Elections 1993

== Results by division ==
=== Bowman ===
1993 Australian federal election: Bowman
Party	Candidate	Votes	%	±%
Labor	Con Sciacca	35,927	50.84	+4.18
Liberal	Debra Wardle	24,700	34.95	+4.28
National	Nigel Marsh	3,009	4.26	−1.98
Democrats	Murray Henman	2,714	3.84	−12.60
Greens	Frank Bickle	2,674	3.78	+3.78
Independent	Richard May	574	0.81	+0.81
Confederate Action	Kevin Hendstock	551	0.78	+0.78
Independent	Mark McLaren	301	0.43	+0.43
	Bill Wheeler	214	0.30	+0.30
Total formal votes		70,664	97.41	−0.32
Informal votes		1,878	2.59	+0.32
Turnout		72,542	96.26	
Two-party-preferred result
Labor	Con Sciacca	40,554	57.42	−0.61
Liberal	Debra Wardle	30,067	42.58	+0.61
Labor hold		Swing	−0.61	

=== Brisbane ===
1993 Australian federal election: Brisbane
Party	Candidate	Votes	%	±%
Labor	Arch Bevis	34,917	46.96	+0.83
Liberal	Neil Ennis	26,717	35.93	+1.08
Democrats	Kerri Kellett	4,166	5.60	−7.19
Greens	Lou Gugenberger	2,484	3.34	+3.34
Independent	Tom Veivers	1,949	2.62	+2.62
National	Justin Choveaux	1,663	2.24	−0.80
	Susan Price	951	1.28	+1.28
Independent	M. P. Gibson	545	0.73	+0.73
Confederate Action	Robert Doring	452	0.61	+0.61
Natural Law	Valerie Thurlow	274	0.37	+0.37
Independent	Mariusz Chojnacki	239	0.32	+0.32
Total formal votes		74,357	97.13	−0.58
Informal votes		2,197	2.87	+0.58
Turnout		76,544	94.92	
Two-party-preferred result
Labor	Arch Bevis	41,610	55.99	−0.16
Liberal	Neil Ennis	32,705	44.01	+0.16
Labor hold		Swing	−0.16	

=== Capricornia ===
1993 Australian federal election: Capricornia
Party	Candidate	Votes	%	±%
Labor	Marjorie Henzell	30,766	40.86	−9.71
National	Margaret Goody	16,243	21.57	−14.66
Liberal	Chris Alroe	12,807	17.01	+15.57
Independent	Jim Rundle	5,308	7.05	+7.05
Independent	Keith Wright	4,472	5.94	+5.94
Confederate Action	Mavis Hinton	1,835	2.44	+2.44
Democrats	Fay Lawrence	1,673	2.22	+1.05
Greens	Bob Muir	1,259	1.67	−8.91
	David Bridgeman	363	0.48	+0.48
	Cameron Smyth	322	0.43	+0.43
Indigenous Peoples	Bevan Tull	240	0.32	+0.32
Total formal votes		75,288	97.41	−0.48
Informal votes		1,998	2.59	+0.48
Turnout		77,286	96.07	
Two-party-preferred result
Labor	Marjorie Henzell	39,663	52.73	−4.68
National	Margaret Goody	35,554	47.27	+4.68
Labor hold		Swing	−4.68	

=== Dawson ===
1993 Australian federal election: Dawson
Party	Candidate	Votes	%	±%
National	Ray Braithwaite	29,209	38.71	+0.24
Labor	Frank Gilbert	28,954	38.38	−4.47
Confederate Action	Bob McCulloch	6,838	9.06	+9.06
Liberal	John Mansell	5,545	7.35	−3.36
Democrats	Steve Quadrio	1,884	2.50	−5.44
Greens	Ian Fox	1,795	2.38	+2.34
Independent	Neil Heiniger	625	0.83	+0.83
Independent	Michelle Mac Nevin	597	0.79	+0.79
Total formal votes		75,447	97.24	−0.62
Informal votes		2,141	2.76	+0.62
Turnout		77,588	95.70	
Two-party-preferred result
National	Ray Braithwaite	40,605	53.84	+3.68
Labor	Frank Gilbert	34,811	46.16	−3.68
National hold		Swing	+3.68	

=== Dickson ===
1993 Dickson supplementary election
Party	Candidate	Votes	%	±%
Labor	Michael Lavarch	29,515	43.56	+1.08
Liberal	Bruce Flegg	22,738	33.56	+3.31
National	Trevor St Baker	6,921	10.21	−1.47
Greens	Desiree Mahoney	3,746	5.53	+5.53
Confederate Action	Mal Beard	1,883	2.78	+2.78
Democrats	Glen Spicer	1,508	2.23	−13.26
Independent	Michael Darby	939	1.39	+1.39
Independent	Alan Bawden	333	0.49	+0.49
	Leonard Matthews	174	0.26	+0.26
Total formal votes		67,757	98.03	−0.02
Informal votes		1,360	1.97	+0.02
Turnout		69,117	90.21	
Two-party-preferred result
Labor	Michael Lavarch	34,033	50.26	−2.53
Liberal	Bruce Flegg	33,686	49.74	+2.53
Labor notional hold		Swing	−2.53	

=== Fadden ===
1993 Australian federal election: Fadden
Party	Candidate	Votes	%	±%
Liberal	David Jull	30,581	45.27	+0.76
Labor	Peter Eldon	25,973	38.45	+1.51
Democrats	Leonie Sanders	3,381	5.00	−8.55
National	Iona Abrahamson	3,200	4.74	+0.36
Greens	Harry Darville	3,020	4.47	+4.47
Confederate Action	Joe Ross	1,010	1.50	+1.50
Indigenous Peoples	Shaun Matheson	212	0.31	+0.31
Natural Law	Otto Kuhne	177	0.26	+0.26
Total formal votes		67,554	97.26	−0.47
Informal votes		1,901	2.74	+0.47
Turnout		69,455	95.42	
Two-party-preferred result
Liberal	David Jull	36,297	53.77	−0.75
Labor	Peter Eldon	31,205	46.23	+0.75
Liberal hold		Swing	−0.75	

=== Fairfax ===
1993 Australian federal election: Fairfax
Party	Candidate	Votes	%	±%
Liberal	Alex Somlyay	28,686	40.18	+15.38
Labor	Kerry Orton	22,022	30.84	−1.44
National	Gordon Simpson	10,382	14.54	−12.91
Democrats	Elizabeth Oss-Emer	3,313	4.64	−8.95
Greens	Peter Parnell	2,858	4.00	+4.00
Confederate Action	Santo Ferraro	1,646	2.31	+2.31
Independent	John Henderson	1,567	2.19	+2.19
Natural Law	Keith Valentine	924	1.29	+1.29
Total formal votes		71,398	97.47	−0.52
Informal votes		1,850	2.53	+0.52
Turnout		73,248	94.85	
Two-party-preferred result
Liberal	Alex Somlyay	42,662	59.80	+2.02
Labor	Kerry Orton	28,683	40.20	−2.02
Liberal hold		Swing	+2.02	

=== Fisher ===
1993 Australian federal election: Fisher
Party	Candidate	Votes	%	±%
Labor	Ian Burgett	25,638	35.78	−2.25
Liberal	Peter Slipper	24,195	33.76	+9.78
National	Winston Johnston	10,497	14.65	−10.21
Independent	Chris Savage	4,758	6.64	+6.64
Confederate Action	Jeff Johnson	2,315	3.23	+3.23
Democrats	Digby Jakeman	2,170	3.03	−9.20
Greens	Chris Gwin	1,824	2.55	+2.55
Indigenous Peoples	Sam Watson	266	0.37	+0.37
Total formal votes		71,663	97.68	−0.29
Informal votes		1,704	2.32	+0.29
Turnout		73,367	95.81	
Two-party-preferred result
Liberal	Peter Slipper	39,650	55.36	+2.21
Labor	Ian Burgett	31,976	44.64	−2.21
Liberal hold		Swing	+2.21	

=== Forde ===
1993 Australian federal election: Forde
Party	Candidate	Votes	%	±%
Labor	Mary Crawford	36,227	51.76	+4.90
Liberal	Jim Planincic	23,590	33.70	−0.39
Democrats	Alan Dickson	4,085	5.84	−6.32
National	Peter Flaws	2,527	3.61	−0.51
Greens	Barry Stark	2,070	2.96	+1.41
Confederate Action	Marion Corbley	1,494	2.13	+2.13
Total formal votes		69,993	97.51	+0.16
Informal votes		1,787	2.49	−0.16
Turnout		71,780	94.58	
Two-party-preferred result
Labor	Mary Crawford	40,969	58.57	+2.22
Liberal	Jim Planincic	28,979	41.43	−2.22
Labor hold		Swing	+2.22	

=== Griffith ===
1993 Australian federal election: Griffith
Party	Candidate	Votes	%	±%
Labor	Ben Humphreys	37,090	49.47	+1.52
Liberal	Mick Privitera	25,663	34.23	−0.63
Democrats	Gavin Kernot	3,525	4.70	−8.51
Greens	Barry Wilson	3,368	4.49	+4.49
National	David Stone	2,631	3.51	+0.56
	Coral Wynter	948	1.26	+1.26
Independent	Steven Dickson	938	1.25	+1.25
Natural Law	Maxine Weston	810	1.08	+1.08
Total formal votes		74,973	97.25	−0.29
Informal votes		2,122	2.75	+0.29
Turnout		77,095	94.34	
Two-party-preferred result
Labor	Ben Humphreys	43,425	57.98	−0.04
Liberal	Mick Privitera	31,473	42.02	+0.04
Labor hold		Swing	−0.04	

=== Groom ===
1993 Australian federal election: Groom
Party	Candidate	Votes	%	±%
Liberal	Bill Taylor	25,915	34.38	−5.80
Labor	Ray Webber	20,198	26.80	−3.92
National	Joe Hanna	16,131	21.40	+4.02
Confederate Action	Garry Berghofer	7,672	10.18	+10.18
Democrats	Alan May	2,839	3.77	−7.91
Greens	Carey Harrison	1,712	2.27	+2.27
Indigenous Peoples	Wally McCarthy	905	1.20	+1.20
Total formal votes		75,372	97.57	−0.56
Informal votes		1,875	2.43	+0.56
Turnout		77,247	96.23	
Two-party-preferred result
Liberal	Bill Taylor	48,304	64.12	+1.69
Labor	Ray Webber	27,031	35.88	−1.69
Liberal hold		Swing	+1.69	

=== Herbert ===
1993 Australian federal election: Herbert
Party	Candidate	Votes	%	±%
Labor	Ted Lindsay	31,349	40.56	−5.33
Liberal	Peter Hazard	24,300	31.44	+6.63
Independent	John Robinson	10,002	12.94	+12.94
National	Robyn Quick	5,374	6.95	−11.08
Democrats	Col Parker	2,848	3.68	−7.59
Greens	Dave Kimble	1,771	2.29	+2.29
Confederate Action	Warren Harvey	640	0.83	+0.83
Independent	Bill Setter	515	0.67	+0.67
Indigenous Peoples	Cilla Pryor	495	0.64	+0.64
Total formal votes		77,294	97.50	−0.52
Informal votes		1,984	2.50	+0.52
Turnout		79,278	95.56	
Two-party-preferred result
Labor	Ted Lindsay	40,452	52.37	−2.63
Liberal	Peter Hazard	36,786	47.63	+2.63
Labor hold		Swing	−2.63	

=== Hinkler ===
1993 Australian federal election: Hinkler
Party	Candidate	Votes	%	±%
Labor	Brian Courtice	33,162	42.80	−4.99
National	Paul Neville	23,447	30.26	−3.50
Liberal	John Abbott	9,767	12.61	+3.82
Confederate Action	Bill May	3,628	4.68	+4.68
Democrats	Terry Clark	3,044	3.93	−4.97
Citizens Electoral Council	Maurice Hetherington	2,732	3.53	+3.53
Greens	Lorrelle Campbell	1,451	1.87	+1.10
Indigenous Peoples	Colin Johnson	253	0.33	+0.33
Total formal votes		77,484	97.82	+0.06
Informal votes		1,732	2.18	−0.06
Turnout		79,207	96.09	
Two-party-preferred result
National	Paul Neville	38,897	50.22	+4.62
Labor	Brian Courtice	38,553	49.78	−4.62
National gain from Labor		Swing	+4.62	

=== Kennedy ===
1993 Australian federal election: Kennedy
Party	Candidate	Votes	%	±%
Labor	Rob Hulls	30,920	41.99	−2.83
National	Bob Katter	27,805	37.76	+6.29
Liberal	Dave Cashmore	7,882	10.70	−4.72
Confederate Action	Bill Petrie	3,162	4.29	+4.29
Democrats	Kevin Paine	1,906	2.59	−5.44
Greens	Saeed de Ridder	1,241	1.69	+1.69
Indigenous Peoples	Norman Johnson	401	0.54	+0.54
	Donald Logan	323	0.44	+0.44
Total formal votes		73,640	96.96	−0.23
Informal votes		2,308	3.04	+0.23
Turnout		75,948	93.92	
Two-party-preferred result
National	Bob Katter	38,915	52.88	+4.78
Labor	Rob Hulls	34,675	47.12	−4.78
National gain from Labor		Swing	+4.78	

=== Leichhardt ===
1993 Australian federal election: Leichhardt
Party	Candidate	Votes	%	±%
Labor	Peter Dodd	29,129	41.96	−2.44
Liberal	Bill Cummings	21,930	31.59	+8.81
National	Ben Wilson	9,722	14.00	−6.00
Democrats	Giselle Thomas	3,613	5.20	−6.05
Greens	Henrietta Fourmile	2,446	3.52	+3.52
Confederate Action	Gavin Roberts	998	1.44	+1.44
Natural Law	Dorothy McKenzie	817	1.18	+1.18
Independent	Jim Cavill	386	0.56	+0.56
Independent	Stephen Piper	380	0.55	+0.55
Total formal votes		69,421	96.71	−0.75
Informal votes		2,363	3.29	+0.75
Turnout		71,784	93.39	
Two-party-preferred result
Labor	Peter Dodd	35,575	51.32	−2.42
Liberal	Bill Cummings	33,742	48.68	+2.42
Labor hold		Swing	−2.42	

=== Lilley ===
1993 Australian federal election: Lilley
Party	Candidate	Votes	%	±%
Labor	Wayne Swan	36,960	49.94	+1.05
Liberal	Bill Leveritt	26,715	36.09	+0.25
Democrats	Caroline Smith	3,044	4.11	−6.90
National	Doug Foggo	2,738	3.70	+0.33
Greens	Michelle Rielly	2,333	3.15	+3.15
Confederate Action	Graham McDonald	844	1.14	+1.14
Independent	Cyril Dennison	549	0.74	+0.74
Independent	Andrew Coates	492	0.66	+0.66
Independent	Frank Andrews	339	0.46	+0.46
Total formal votes		74,014	97.52	−0.36
Informal votes		1,881	2.48	+0.36
Turnout		75,895	95.73	
Two-party-preferred result
Labor	Wayne Swan	41,601	56.22	−0.46
Liberal	Bill Leveritt	32,391	43.78	+0.46
Labor hold		Swing	−0.46	

=== Maranoa ===
1993 Australian federal election: Maranoa
Party	Candidate	Votes	%	±%
National	Bruce Scott	41,502	53.43	+6.42
Labor	Anne Jones	19,475	25.07	−5.47
Liberal	Gerard Clarke	6,859	8.83	−4.80
Confederate Action	Andrew Chambers	3,703	4.77	+4.77
Independent	Brian Hooper	2,248	2.89	+2.89
Democrats	Danny Dutton	2,039	2.63	−5.54
Greens	Sarah Moles	1,217	1.57	+1.57
Indigenous Peoples	Rose Turnbull	626	0.81	+0.81
Total formal votes		77,669	97.14	−0.74
Informal votes		2,288	2.86	+0.74
Turnout		79,957	95.73	
Two-party-preferred result
National	Bruce Scott	52,874	68.13	+4.64
Labor	Anne Jones	24,731	31.87	−4.64
National hold		Swing	+4.64	

=== McPherson ===
1993 Australian federal election: McPherson
Party	Candidate	Votes	%	±%
Liberal	John Bradford	34,497	49.95	+0.81
Labor	Mark Whillans	24,718	35.79	+2.11
National	Allan de Brenni	3,082	4.46	−0.40
Greens	Christine Lovison	2,813	4.07	+4.07
Democrats	Jason Neville	2,574	3.73	−6.13
Confederate Action	Bruce Whiteside	1,381	2.00	+2.00
Total formal votes		69,065	97.42	−0.47
Informal votes		1,831	2.58	+0.47
Turnout		70,896	94.88	
Two-party-preferred result
Liberal	John Bradford	40,790	59.08	−0.83
Labor	Mark Whillans	28,253	40.92	+0.83
Liberal hold		Swing	−0.83	

=== Moncrieff ===
1993 Australian federal election: Moncrieff
Party	Candidate	Votes	%	±%
Liberal	Kathy Sullivan	36,551	52.63	+0.55
Labor	Bob Brown	22,489	32.38	+1.38
National	Warren Pike	3,780	5.44	+0.45
Greens	Sally Mackinnon	2,767	3.98	+3.98
Democrats	Jason Neville	2,672	3.85	−7.55
Confederate Action	Steven Stringer	1,195	1.72	+1.72
Total formal votes		69,454	97.47	−0.21
Informal votes		1,804	2.53	+0.21
Turnout		71,258	94.72	
Two-party-preferred result
Liberal	Kathy Sullivan	43,333	62.41	−0.21
Labor	Bob Brown	26,101	37.59	+0.21
Liberal hold		Swing	−0.21	

=== Moreton ===
1993 Australian federal election: Moreton
Party	Candidate	Votes	%	±%
Labor	Garrie Gibson	33,065	44.49	+2.45
Liberal	Margaret Steen	30,474	41.00	+0.18
Democrats	Ian Holland	3,407	4.58	−8.25
Greens	D. C. Beattie-Burnett	3,050	4.10	+3.03
National	John Kearns	2,074	2.79	+0.15
Indigenous Peoples	Martin Ebsworth	671	0.90	+0.90
Confederate Action	Rod Jeanneret	613	0.82	+0.82
Independent	Jim O'Dempsey	370	0.50	+0.50
Independent	Ira Smith	370	0.50	+0.50
	Shane Dean	233	0.31	+0.31
Total formal votes		74,327	97.27	−0.54
Informal votes		2,086	2.73	+0.54
Turnout		76,413	95.58	
Two-party-preferred result
Labor	Garrie Gibson	38,424	51.74	−0.12
Liberal	Margaret Steen	35,844	48.26	+0.12
Labor hold		Swing	−0.12	

=== Oxley ===
1993 Australian federal election: Oxley
Party	Candidate	Votes	%	±%
Labor	Les Scott	38,216	52.70	+1.47
Liberal	George Blaine	18,520	25.54	−3.03
National	Marie McCullagh	4,121	5.68	+0.48
Democrats	Mary Fernando-Pulle	3,881	5.35	−9.32
Greens	Suzanne Gibbon	3,096	4.27	+4.27
Confederate Action	Geoff Abnett	2,550	3.52	+3.52
Independent	Les Wynne	1,703	2.35	+2.35
	Sue White	423	0.58	+0.58
Total formal votes		72,510	96.68	−0.76
Informal votes		2,488	3.32	+0.76
Turnout		74,998	95.86	
Two-party-preferred result
Labor	Les Scott	45,344	62.58	+1.64
Liberal	George Blaine	27,114	37.42	−1.64
Labor hold		Swing	+1.64	

=== Petrie ===
1993 Australian federal election: Petrie
Party	Candidate	Votes	%	±%
Labor	Gary Johns	32,436	44.14	−0.73
Liberal	Alan Sherlock	29,487	40.12	+1.21
Independent	Jeff Gehrmann	3,182	4.33	+4.33
Democrats	Zillah Jackson	3,167	4.31	−6.89
National	Brendan Power	2,126	2.89	−1.02
Greens	Angela Jones	1,854	2.52	+2.52
Confederate Action	Allan Mutch	1,025	1.39	+1.39
Natural Law	Gina Neville	215	0.29	+0.29
Total formal votes		73,492	97.51	−0.63
Informal votes		1,887	2.49	+0.63
Turnout		75,369	95.93	
Two-party-preferred result
Labor	Gary Johns	38,256	52.10	−0.84
Liberal	Alan Sherlock	35,176	47.90	+0.84
Labor hold		Swing	−0.84	

=== Rankin ===
1993 Australian federal election: Rankin
Party	Candidate	Votes	%	±%
Labor	David Beddall	32,157	45.19	+0.94
Liberal	Sallyanne Atkinson	25,635	36.03	+4.84
National	Marian Schwarz	5,051	7.10	−2.84
Democrats	Susan Werba	3,106	4.37	−7.88
Greens	Richard Nielsen	1,775	2.49	+2.40
Independent	Ian Reid	1,722	2.42	+2.42
Confederate Action	Lester Reaves	1,290	1.81	+1.81
	Debbie Bell	419	0.59	+0.59
Total formal votes		71,155	96.97	−0.09
Informal votes		2,226	3.03	+0.09
Turnout		73,381	95.16	
Two-party-preferred result
Labor	David Beddall	37,449	52.67	−0.49
Liberal	Sallyanne Atkinson	33,647	47.33	+0.49
Labor hold		Swing	−0.49	

=== Ryan ===
1993 Australian federal election: Ryan
Party	Candidate	Votes	%	±%
Liberal	John Moore	40,953	52.59	+6.90
Labor	Fleur Yuile	23,698	30.43	+1.36
Democrats	Sid Young	5,019	6.45	−11.18
Greens	Willy Bach	3,795	4.87	+4.87
National	Jim Gillan	2,662	3.42	−2.25
Confederate Action	Les Smith	561	0.72	+0.72
Independent	Alan Skyring	431	0.55	−0.73
Independent	Terry Madden	417	0.54	+0.54
Natural Law	Mark Brady	330	0.42	+0.42
Total formal votes		77,866	97.89	−0.68
Informal votes		1,677	2.11	+0.68
Turnout		79,543	96.02	
Two-party-preferred result
Liberal	John Moore	47,175	60.61	+2.48
Labor	Fleur Yuile	30,662	39.39	−2.48
Liberal hold		Swing	+2.48	

=== Wide Bay ===
1993 Australian federal election: Wide Bay
Party	Candidate	Votes	%	±%
National	Warren Truss	33,255	44.07	−3.76
Labor	Judy Caplick	24,861	32.94	−3.53
Liberal	Trevor Hartshorne	6,519	8.64	+8.05
Confederate Action	Andrew Baker	4,279	5.67	+5.67
Democrats	Marie Woodley	2,700	3.58	−9.22
Greens	Lily Podger	2,083	2.76	+2.76
Independent	Ray Smith	1,770	2.35	+2.35
Total formal votes		75,467	97.69	+0.20
Informal votes		1,786	2.31	−0.20
Turnout		77,253	95.92	
Two-party-preferred result
National	Warren Truss	45,043	59.71	+4.12
Labor	Judy Caplick	30,390	40.29	−4.12
National hold		Swing	+4.12	

== See also ==
- Results of the 1993 Australian federal election (House of Representatives)
- Members of the Australian House of Representatives, 1993–1996
