= Members of the Australian House of Representatives, 1990–1993 =

This is a list of members of the Australian House of Representatives from 1990 to 1993, as elected at the 1990 federal election.

Member	Party	Electorate	State	Term in office
Ken Aldred	Liberal	Deakin	Vic	1975–1980, 1983–1996
John Anderson	National	Gwydir	NSW	1989–2007
Neil Andrew	Liberal	Wakefield	SA	1983–2004
Kevin Andrews ^{[1]}	Liberal	Menzies	Vic	1991–2022
Rod Atkinson	Liberal	Isaacs	Vic	1990–1996
Fran Bailey	Liberal	McEwen	Vic	1990–1993, 1996–2010
Peter Baldwin	Labor	Sydney	NSW	1983–1998
Julian Beale	Liberal	Bruce	Vic	1984–1996
Kim Beazley	Labor	Swan	WA	1980–2007
David Beddall	Labor	Rankin	Qld	1983–1998
Arch Bevis	Labor	Brisbane	Qld	1990–2010
Gordon Bilney	Labor	Kingston	SA	1983–1996
Neal Blewett	Labor	Bonython	SA	1977–1994
John Bradford	Liberal	McPherson	Qld	1990–1998
Ray Braithwaite	National	Dawson	Qld	1975–1996
Laurie Brereton	Labor	Kingsford-Smith	NSW	1990–2004
Russell Broadbent	Liberal	Corinella	Vic	1990–1993, 1996–1998, 2004–2025
Bob Brown	Labor	Charlton	NSW	1980–1998
Neil Brown ^{[1]}	Liberal	Menzies	Vic	1969–1972, 1975–1983, 1984–1991
Max Burr	Liberal	Lyons	Tas	1975–1993
Alan Cadman	Liberal	Mitchell	NSW	1974–2007
Ewen Cameron	Liberal	Indi	Vic	1977–1993
Graeme Campbell	Labor	Kalgoorlie	WA	1980–1998
Jim Carlton	Liberal	Mackellar	NSW	1977–1994
Bob Catley	Labor	Adelaide	SA	1990–1993
Ric Charlesworth	Labor	Perth	WA	1983–1993
Fred Chaney	Liberal	Pearce	WA	1990–1993
Bob Charles	Liberal	La Trobe	Vic	1990–2004
Phil Cleary ^{[2]}	Independent	Wills	Vic	1992, 1993–1996
Michael Cobb	National	Parkes	NSW	1984–1998
David Connolly	Liberal	Bradfield	NSW	1974–1996
Peter Costello	Liberal	Higgins	Vic	1990–2009
Brian Courtice	Labor	Hinkler	Qld	1987–1993
Bruce Cowan	National	Lyne	NSW	1980–1993
Mary Crawford	Labor	Forde	Qld	1987–1996
Simon Crean	Labor	Hotham	Vic	1990–2013
Janice Crosio	Labor	Prospect	NSW	1990–2004
Elaine Darling	Labor	Lilley	Qld	1980–1993
John Dawkins	Labor	Fremantle	WA	1974–1975, 1977–1994
Don Dobie	Liberal	Cook	NSW	1966–1972, 1975–1996
Alexander Downer	Liberal	Mayo	SA	1984–2008
Stephen Dubois	Labor	St George	NSW	1984–1993
Michael Duffy	Labor	Holt	Vic	1980–1996
Peter Duncan	Labor	Makin	SA	1984–1996
Harry Edwards	Liberal	Berowra	NSW	1972–1993
Ron Edwards	Labor	Stirling	WA	1983–1993
Paul Elliott	Labor	Parramatta	NSW	1990–1996
Wendy Fatin	Labor	Brand	WA	1983–1996
Laurie Ferguson	Labor	Reid	NSW	1990–2016
Wal Fife	Liberal	Hume	NSW	1975–1993
Paul Filing	Liberal	Moore	WA	1990–1998
Tim Fischer	National	Farrer	NSW	1984–2001
Peter Fisher	National	Mallee	Vic	1972–1993
Eric Fitzgibbon	Labor	Hunter	NSW	1984–1996
Frank Ford	Liberal	Dunkley	Vic	1990–1993
Ross Free	Labor	Lindsay	NSW	1980–1996
Chris Gallus	Liberal	Hawker	SA	1990–2004
John Gayler	Labor	Leichhardt	Qld	1983–1993
George Gear	Labor	Canning	WA	1983–1996
Garrie Gibson	Labor	Moreton	Qld	1990–1996
Bruce Goodluck	Liberal	Franklin	Tas	1975–1993
Russ Gorman	Labor	Greenway	NSW	1983–1996
Ted Grace	Labor	Fowler	NSW	1984–1998
Alan Griffiths	Labor	Maribyrnong	Vic	1983–1996
Steele Hall	Liberal	Boothby	SA	1981–1996
Bob Halverson	Liberal	Casey	Vic	1984–1998
Gerry Hand	Labor	Melbourne	Vic	1983–1993
Bob Hawke ^{[2]}	Labor	Wills	Vic	1980–1992
David Hawker	Liberal	Wannon	Vic	1983–2010
John Hewson	Liberal	Wentworth	NSW	1987–1995
Noel Hicks	National	Riverina-Darling	NSW	1980–1998
Clyde Holding	Labor	Melbourne Ports	Vic	1977–1998
Colin Hollis	Labor	Throsby	NSW	1983–1998
John Howard	Liberal	Bennelong	NSW	1974–2007
Brian Howe	Labor	Batman	Vic	1977–1996
Rob Hulls	Labor	Kennedy	Qld	1990–1993
Ben Humphreys	Labor	Griffith	Qld	1977–1996
Carolyn Jakobsen	Labor	Cowan	WA	1984–1993
Harry Jenkins	Labor	Scullin	Vic	1986–2013
Gary Johns	Labor	Petrie	Qld	1987–1996
Barry Jones	Labor	Lalor	Vic	1977–1998
David Jull	Liberal	Fadden	Qld	1975–1983, 1984–2007
Paul Keating	Labor	Blaxland	NSW	1969–1996
Ros Kelly	Labor	Canberra	ACT	1980–1995
David Kemp	Liberal	Goldstein	Vic	1990–2004
John Kerin	Labor	Werriwa	NSW	1972–1975, 1978–1993
Duncan Kerr	Labor	Denison	Tas	1987–2010
John Langmore	Labor	Fraser	ACT	1984–1997
Michael Lavarch	Labor	Fisher	Qld	1987–1996
Michael Lee	Labor	Dobell	NSW	1984–2001
Ted Lindsay	Labor	Herbert	Qld	1983–1996
Bruce Lloyd	National	Murray	Vic	1971–1996
Ted Mack	Independent	North Sydney	NSW	1990–1996
Michael MacKellar	Liberal	Warringah	NSW	1969–1994
Stephen Martin	Labor	Macarthur	NSW	1984–2002
Stewart McArthur	Liberal	Corangamite	Vic	1984–2007
Peter McGauran	National	Gippsland	Vic	1983–2008
Jeannette McHugh	Labor	Phillip	NSW	1983–1996
Ian McLachlan	Liberal	Barker	SA	1990–1998
Leo McLeay	Labor	Grayndler	NSW	1979–2004
Daryl Melham	Labor	Banks	NSW	1990–2013
Chris Miles	Liberal	Braddon	Tas	1984–1998
John Moore	Liberal	Ryan	Qld	1975–2001
Allan Morris	Labor	Newcastle	NSW	1983–2001
Peter Morris	Labor	Shortland	NSW	1972–1998
Garry Nehl	National	Cowper	NSW	1984–2001
Neville Newell	Labor	Richmond	NSW	1990–1996
Peter Nugent	Liberal	Aston	Vic	1990–2001
Neil O'Keefe	Labor	Burke	Vic	1984–2001
Lloyd O'Neil	Labor	Grey	SA	1983–1993
Andrew Peacock	Liberal	Kooyong	Vic	1966–1994
Roger Price	Labor	Chifley	NSW	1984–2010
Geoff Prosser	Liberal	Forrest	WA	1987–2007
Gary Punch	Labor	Barton	NSW	1983–1996
Bruce Reid	Liberal	Bendigo	Vic	1990–1998
Peter Reith	Liberal	Flinders	Vic	1982–1983, 1984–2001
John Riggall	Liberal	McMillan	Vic	1990–1993
Allan Rocher	Liberal	Curtin	WA	1981–1998
Michael Ronaldson	Liberal	Ballarat	Vic	1990–2001
Philip Ruddock	Liberal	Dundas	NSW	1973–2016
Rod Sawford	Labor	Port Adelaide	SA	1988–2007
Gordon Scholes	Labor	Corio	Vic	1967–1993
Con Sciacca	Labor	Bowman	Qld	1987–2004
Bruce Scott	National	Maranoa	Qld	1990–2016
John Scott	Labor	Hindmarsh	SA	1980–1993
Les Scott	Labor	Oxley	Qld	1988–1996
Peter Shack	Liberal	Tangney	WA	1977–1983, 1984–1993
John Sharp	National	Gilmore	NSW	1984–1998
David Simmons	Labor	Calare	NSW	1983–1996
Ian Sinclair	National	New England	NSW	1963–1998
Warwick Smith	Liberal	Bass	Tas	1984–1993
Jim Snow	Labor	Eden-Monaro	NSW	1983–1996
Warren Snowdon	Labor	Northern Territory	NT	1987–1996, 1998–2022
Alex Somlyay	Liberal	Fairfax	Qld	1990–2013
Peter Staples	Labor	Jagajaga	Vic	1983–1996
Kathy Sullivan	Liberal	Moncrieff	Qld	1984–2001
Bill Taylor	Liberal	Groom	Qld	1988–1998
Andrew Theophanous	Labor	Calwell	Vic	1980–2001
Robert Tickner	Labor	Hughes	NSW	1984–1996
Warren Truss	National	Wide Bay	Qld	1990–2016
Wilson Tuckey	Liberal	O'Connor	WA	1980–2010
Frank Walker	Labor	Robertson	NSW	1990–1996
Alasdair Webster	Liberal	Macquarie	NSW	1984–1993
Stewart West	Labor	Cunningham	NSW	1977–1993
Ralph Willis	Labor	Gellibrand	Vic	1972–1998
Ian Wilson	Liberal	Sturt	SA	1966–1969, 1972–1993
Bob Woods	Liberal	Lowe	NSW	1987–1993
Harry Woods	Labor	Page	NSW	1990–1996
Michael Wooldridge	Liberal	Chisholm	Vic	1987–2001
Keith Wright	Labor/Independent ^{[3]}	Capricornia	Qld	1984–1993

^{1} Menzies Liberal MP Neil Brown resigned in early 1991. Liberal candidate Kevin Andrews won the resulting by-election.
^{2} Wills Labor MP and outgoing Prime Minister Bob Hawke resigned in early 1992. Independent candidate Phil Cleary won the resulting by-election, only to have the result overturned by the Court of Disputed Returns in the landmark case Sykes v Cleary on the grounds that Cleary, a school teacher, was in the employ of the government at the time. Another by-election was not held due to the proximity of the 1993 election, where Cleary, having resigned his teaching position, again won the seat.
^{3} Capricornia Labor MP Keith Wright was charged with sex offences in late 1992. He subsequently lost preselection to recontest his seat at the 1993 federal election, and was expelled from the party on 20 February 1993 after nominating to recontest his seat as an independent.
