= Division of Fadden =

Australian federal electoral division

Fadden Australian House of Representatives Division
- Interactive map of boundaries since the 2019 federal election
- Created: 1977
- MP: Cameron Caldwell
- Party: Liberal (Note: Member of the Liberal National Party of Queensland sitting with the federal parliamentary Liberal Party.)
- Namesake: Sir Arthur Fadden
- Electors: 135,790 (2025)
- Area: 387 km^{2} (149.4 sq mi)
- Demographic: Provincial
Electorates around Fadden:
Forde	Bowman	South Pacific Ocean
Forde	Fadden	South Pacific Ocean
Wright	Moncrieff	South Pacific Ocean

The Division of Fadden is an Australian electoral division in the state of Queensland, covering most of the northern Gold Coast, including Coomera, Labrador, Ormeau, Pimpama and Runaway Bay. Cameron Caldwell of the Liberal Party has represented the electorate since 2023.

== Geography ==
Since 1984, federal electoral division boundaries in Australia have been determined at redistributions by a redistribution committee appointed by the Australian Electoral Commission. Redistributions occur for the boundaries of divisions in a particular state, and they occur every seven years, or sooner if a state's representation entitlement changes or when divisions of a state are malapportioned.

== History ==
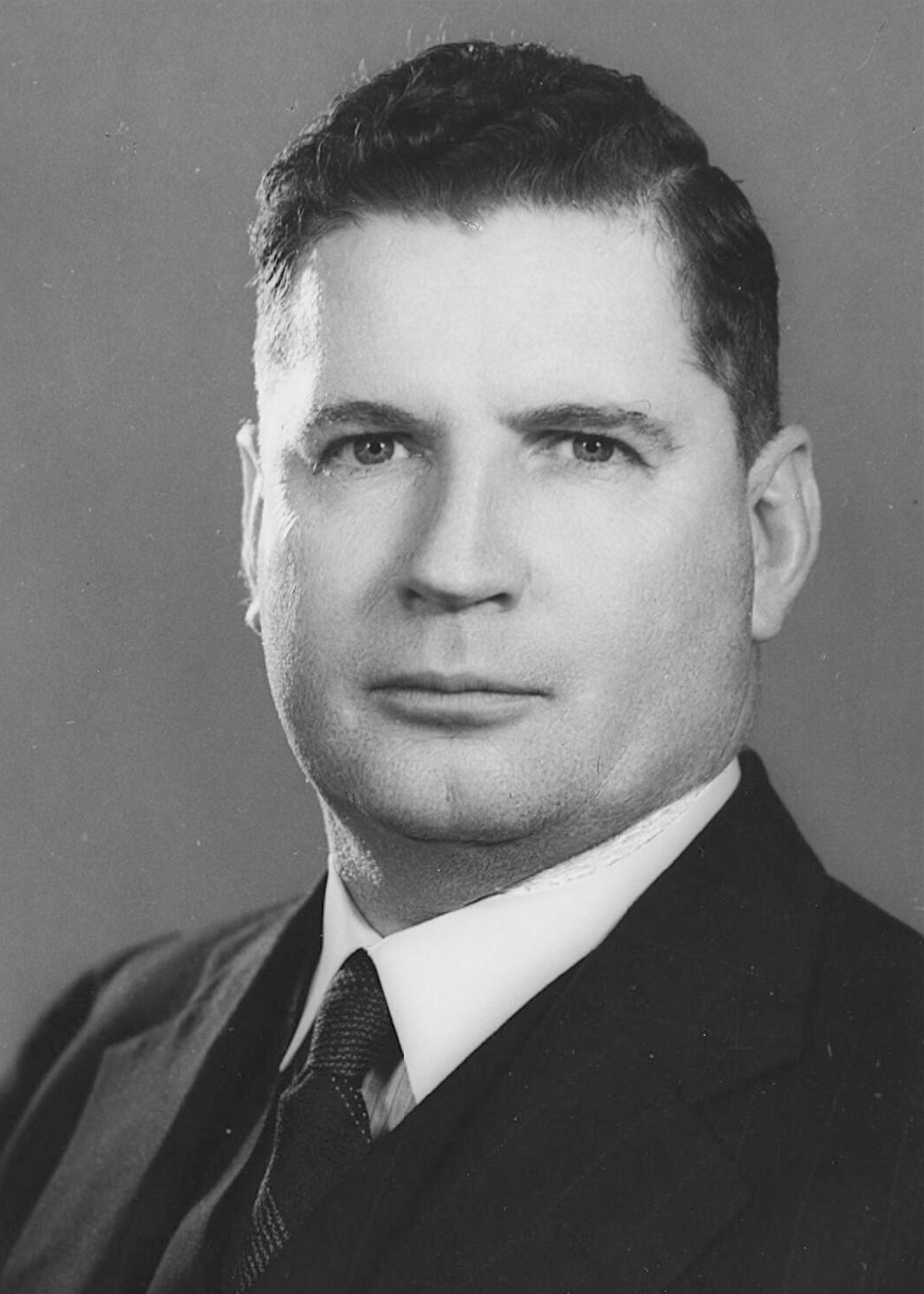
Sir Arthur Fadden, the division's namesake

The division was created in 1977 and is named after Sir Arthur Fadden, Prime Minister of Australia in 1941. When it was created it included a large area south of Brisbane, from the far south of the city to the Gold Coast hinterland, and was a marginal seat that changed hands between the Liberal Party and Australian Labor Party. A 1984 redistribution pushed it further into Brisbane, and it remained a marginal Liberal seat for most of the 1980s. A 1996 redistribution pushed it into the Gold Coast, and since then it has been a comfortably safe Liberal seat.

By 2004, it had moved almost clear of its original boundaries to become an exclusively Gold Coast seat.

== Members ==
Image	Member	Party	Term	Notes
	Don Cameron (1940–)	Liberal	10 December 1977 – 5 March 1983	Previously held the Division of Griffith. Lost seat. Later elected to the Division of Moreton in 1983
	David Beddall (1948-)	Labor	5 March 1983 – 1 December 1984	Transferred to the Division of Rankin
	David Jull (1944–2011)	Liberal	1 December 1984 – 17 October 2007	Previously held the Division of Bowman. Served as minister under Howard. Retired
	Stuart Robert (1970–)	Liberal	24 November 2007 – 18 May 2023	Served as minister under Turnbull and Morrison. Resigned to retire from politics
	Cameron Caldwell (1979–)	Liberal	15 July 2023 – present	Incumbent

== Election results ==
2025 Australian federal election: Fadden
Party	Candidate	Votes	%	±%
Liberal National	Cameron Caldwell	45,627	40.96	−3.66
Labor	Letitia Del Fabbro	30,526	27.40	+5.05
Greens	Andrew Stimson	10,359	9.30	−1.43
One Nation	Nick Muir	8,896	7.99	−0.69
People First	John Armfield	4,938	4.43	+4.43
Trumpet of Patriots	Nathan O'Brien	4,561	4.09	+4.09
Independent	Stewart Brooker	3,124	2.80	−1.37
Family First	Patricia Martin	2,198	1.97	+1.97
Citizens	Dennis Pukallus	1,169	1.05	+1.05
Total formal votes		111,398	94.25	−1.44
Informal votes		6,793	5.75	+1.44
Turnout		118,191	87.08	+0.54
Two-party-preferred result
Liberal National	Cameron Caldwell	63,364	56.88	−3.75
Labor	Letitia Del Fabbro	48,034	43.12	+3.75
Liberal National hold		Swing	−3.75	
