= Donald Milner Cameron =

Australian politician

Don Cameron AM
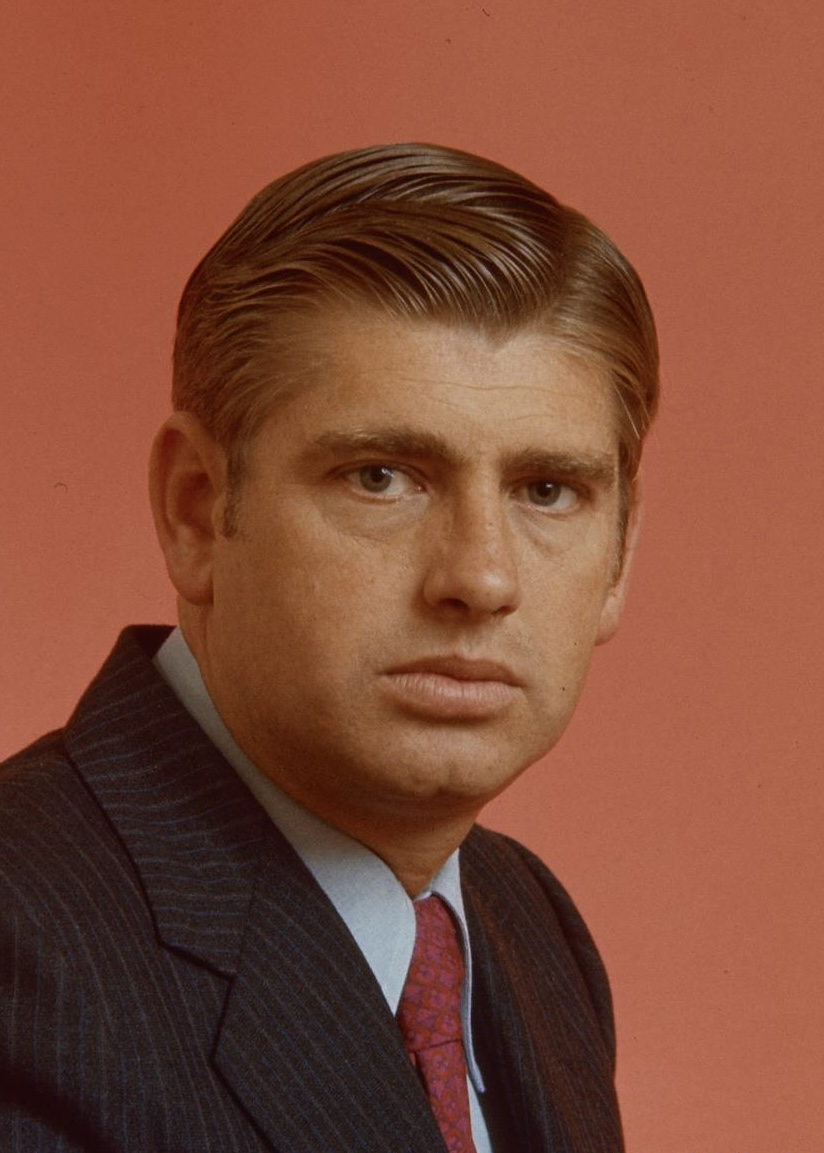
- Official portrait, 1974

Member of the Australian Parliament for Moreton
- In office 5 November 1983 – 24 March 1990
- Preceded by: James Killen
- Succeeded by: Garrie Gibson

Member of the Australian Parliament for Fadden
- In office 10 December 1977 – 5 March 1983
- Preceded by: New seat
- Succeeded by: David Beddall

Member of the Australian Parliament for Griffith
- In office 26 November 1966 – 10 December 1977
- Preceded by: Wilfred Coutts
- Succeeded by: Ben Humphreys

Personal details
- Born: 6 February 1940 (age 86) Brisbane, Queensland
- Party: Liberal Party of Australia
- Spouse: Lila Cameron
- Children: Heather Cameron, Andrea Cameron, Alana Cameron, Suzanne Cameron
- Occupation: Corporate executive

Donald Milner Cameron AM (born 6 February 1940) is a former Australian politician. He was born in Brisbane, and educated at the Anglican Church Grammar School and the University of Queensland.

He became a junior corporate executive and then industrial officer for the Australian Association of Employers of Waterside Labour. He joined the Liberal Party of Australia, and in 1966, aged 26, he won the marginal seat of Griffith in inner Brisbane, and held it against determined challenges from the Australian Labor Party until 1977, when a redistribution nearly erased his majority there. He then shifted to the safer seat of Fadden.

In 1972, Cameron announced his support for lowering the voting age from 21 to 18 and said the McMahon government's inaction on the matter was alienating young people.

In the big swing to Labor at the 1983 election, Don Cameron was defeated, but he was re-elected shortly after at a by-election for the seat of Moreton, which he held until 1990, when he was again defeated.

In the 2000 Queen's Birthday Honours, Don Cameron was appointed Member of the Order of Australia (AM) for "service to the community, particularly youth, and to the Australian Parliament". With the passing of Bill Grayden in 2026, Cameron is the earliest elected Liberal federal parliamentarian still alive, and the last Liberal MP who served under Harold Holt.

Parliament of Australia
Preceded by Wilfred Coutts	Member for Griffith; 1966–1977	Succeeded by Ben Humphreys
New division	Member for Fadden; 1977–1983	Succeeded by David Beddall
Preceded by James Killen	Member for Moreton; 1983–1990	Succeeded by Garrie Gibson
