= Garrie Gibson =

Australian politician (born 1954)

Member of the Australian Parliament for Moreton
- In office 24 March 1990 – 2 March 1996
- Preceded by: Don Cameron
- Succeeded by: Gary Hardgrave

Personal details
- Born: 17 October 1954 (age 71) Brisbane, Queensland
- Party: Australian Labor Party
- Occupation: Teacher

Garrie David Gibson (born 17 October 1954) is an Australian retired politician and ex CEO of RSL clubs Australia. Born in Brisbane, he was educated at the University of Queensland and the North Brisbane College of Advanced Education before becoming a primary teacher. He was an organiser with the Queensland Teachers Union before his election to the Australian House of Representatives in 1990 as the Labor member for Moreton. His election was the first time the Labor Party had ever won the seat, which has existed since Federation, although independent James Wilkinson sat as a Labor member from 1904–1906. Gibson held the seat until his defeat in 1996.

Parliament of Australia
Preceded by Don Cameron	Member for Moreton; 1990–1996	Succeeded by Gary Hardgrave
