= Keith Wright (Australian politician) =

Australian politician

Member of the Australian Parliament for Capricornia
- In office 1 December 1984 – 13 March 1993
- Preceded by: Doug Everingham
- Succeeded by: Marjorie Henzell

Leader of the Opposition in Queensland Leader of the Labor Party in Queensland Elections: 1983
- In office 20 October 1982 – 29 August 1984
- Preceded by: Ed Casey
- Succeeded by: Nev Warburton

Member of the Queensland Legislative Assembly for Rockhampton Rockhampton South (1969–1972)
- In office 17 May 1969 – 5 November 1984
- Preceded by: Rex Pilbeam
- Succeeded by: Paul Braddy

Personal details
- Born: Keith Webb Wright; 9 January 1942 Toowoomba, Queensland, Australia
- Died: 13 January 2015 (aged 73) Vietnam
- Party: Independent (1993); Labor (1969-1993)
- Spouse(s): Allison Donohue (1987–1992); Barbara Mitche
- Children: 1
- Education: Kelvin Grove Teachers College; University of Queensland
- Occupation: Teacher; Politician

Keith Webb Wright (9 January 1942 – 13 January 2015) was an Australian politician, teacher, and Baptist preacher who was Leader of the Labor Party in Queensland and Leader of the Opposition in Queensland between 1982 and 1984. Following his career in state politics, Wright sat in federal parliament for Labor between 1984 and 1993 in the seat of Capricornia.

In 1992, while a member of parliament, Wright was charged with indecent dealing and rape, and lost his seat in the 1993 election. He was jailed for five years in December 1993.

== Biography ==
Born in Toowoomba, Queensland, Wright was educated at the University of Queensland and Kelvin Grove Teachers College in Brisbane before becoming a Rockhampton teacher and Baptist preacher.

On 17 May 1969, Wright was elected to the Legislative Assembly of Queensland as the Labor member for Rockhampton South and after a seat redistribution, represented Rockhampton (1972–1984). In 1982, he became Leader of the Opposition. Wright remained opposition leader until he left the Assembly in 1984, transferring to federal politics as the Labor MP for Capricornia in the Australian House of Representatives.

In December 1992, Wright was charged with indecently dealing and rape, and as a result lost his Labor endorsement. He contested the 1993 election as an independent, gaining 5.9% of the vote but losing to endorsed ALP candidate Marjorie Henzell. In December 1993 he was convicted and jailed for nine years for raping and indecently dealing with two young girls. He served just over five years of his sentence, being released in early 1999.

After leaving jail, Wright moved to Vietnam and ran a company, International Language Academy Australia, which trains TESOL teachers in Southeast Asia.

Wright died in Vietnam on 13 January 2015, aged 73.

Parliament of Queensland
Preceded by Rex Pilbeam	Member for Rockhampton South; 1969–1972	Seat abolished
Seat created	Member for Rockhampton; 1972–1984	Succeeded by Paul Braddy
Political offices
Preceded by Ed Casey	Leader of the Opposition in Queensland; 1982–1984	Succeeded by Nev Warburton
Party political offices
Preceded by Ed Casey	Leader of the Labor Party in Queensland; 1982–1984	Succeeded by Nev Warburton
Parliament of Australia
Preceded by Doug Everingham	Member for Capricornia; 1984–1993	Succeeded by Marjorie Henzell
