= David Jull =

Australian politician

The Honourable David Jull

Minister for Administrative Services
- In office 11 March 1996 – 24 September 1997
- Prime Minister: John Howard
- Preceded by: Frank Walker
- Succeeded by: John Fahey (as Minister for Finance and Administration)

Member of the Australian Parliament for Fadden
- In office 1 December 1984 – 17 October 2007
- Preceded by: David Beddall
- Succeeded by: Stuart Robert

Member of the Australian Parliament for Bowman
- In office 13 December 1975 – 5 March 1983
- Preceded by: Len Keogh
- Succeeded by: Len Keogh

Personal details
- Born: 4 October 1944 Kingaroy, Queensland
- Died: 13 September 2011 (aged 66)
- Party: Liberal Party of Australia
- Education: University of Queensland
- Occupation: Politician

David Francis Jull (4 October 1944 – 13 September 2011) was an Australian politician. He was a long-serving Liberal member of the Australian House of Representatives, representing the Division of Bowman, Queensland, from 1975 to 1983 and Fadden, Queensland, from 1984 to 2007, serving a total of 30 years. He was a minister in the government of John Howard.

== Early life ==
Jull was born in Kingaroy, Queensland, and was educated at the Anglican Church Grammar School and the University of Queensland. He was an announcer on radio and television from 1963 to 1965 and then a director of television station TVQ, Brisbane until he entered politics. He was elected at the 1975 general election, but defeated in 1983.

He was Deputy General Manager of the Queensland Tourist and Travel Corporation 1983–84.

== Politics ==
Jull was reelected to parliament at the 1984 election. He was a member of the Opposition Shadow Ministry 1989–94, and was Minister for Administrative Services 1996–97. He resigned from the ministry following accusations that he had failed to prevent other MPs from abusing their parliamentary allowances.

Jull was chair of the Parliamentary Committee on the Australian Security Intelligence Organisation 1997–2002, and of its successor, the Parliamentary Joint Committee on Intelligence and Security (formerly the Parliamentary Joint Committee on ASIO, ASIS and DSD), since 2002. In this capacity he presided over the Committee's inquiry into the performance of the Australian intelligence services in relation to Iraq's weapons of mass destruction in 2003–04.

== Health problems and death ==
Jull was diagnosed with lung cancer, and in 2005 underwent surgery to remove one of his lungs, He retired from Parliament at the 2007 election, by which time he was the fourth longest serving MP in Parliament.

Jull died on 13 September 2011 in Brisbane, aged 66. He had no children. Jull was accorded a state funeral, which took place on 23 September.

Parliament of Australia
| Preceded by Len Keogh | Member for Bowman; 1975–1983 | Succeeded by Len Keogh |
| Preceded by David Beddall | Member for Fadden; 1984–2007 | Succeeded by Stuart Robert |
Political offices
| Preceded by Frank Walker | Minister for Administrative Services; 1996–1997 | Succeeded by John Fahey (as Minister for Finance and Administration) |
