= David Beddall =

Australian politician (born 1948)

The Honourable David Beddall

Member of the Australian Parliament for Fadden
- In office 5 March 1983 – 1 December 1984
- Preceded by: Don Cameron
- Succeeded by: David Jull

Member of the Australian Parliament for Rankin
- In office 1 December 1984 – 31 August 1998
- Preceded by: New seat
- Succeeded by: Craig Emerson

Personal details
- Born: 27 November 1948 (age 77) Manchester, England
- Party: Australian Labor Party
- Occupation: Financial consultant

David Peter Beddall (born 27 November 1948) is a former Australian politician.

Beddall was born in Manchester, England and was employed by the Commonwealth Bank and was a self-employed commercial finance consultant before he entered parliament. He was elected as Australian Labor Party member in the Australian House of Representatives for the seat of Fadden at the 1983 election, and then for the seat of Rankin at the 1984 election.

In April 1990, he was appointed Minister for Small Business and Customs in the Hawke ministry (Minister for Small Business, Construction and Customs from December 1991). In March 1993, he was appointed junior Communications Minister (serving concurrently with senior Communications Minister Bob Collins) in the second Keating Ministry. As Communications Minister, Beddall launched SBS television and Triple J radio across different parts of Australia, and took the early steps in Telstra's Future Mode of Operation digital transformation.

In December 1993, he and Collins left the Communications portfolio, which was taken by Michael Lee, and Beddall replaced Lee as Minister For Resources. Beddall lost that portfolio with the defeat of the Keating government at the 1996 election, in which he was one of only two Labor MPs returned from Queensland. He retired from parliament at the 1998 election.

== Notes ==
Political offices
Preceded by Barry Jones	Minister for Small Business and Customs; 1990–1991	Succeeded by Chris Schacht (small business); Alan Griffiths customs)
Preceded by Barry Jones	Minister for Small Business, Construction and Customs; 1990–1993	Succeeded by Chris Schacht (small business); Alan Griffiths customs)
Preceded by Michael Lee	Minister for Resources; 1993–1996	Succeeded by Warwick Parer
Parliament of Australia
Preceded by Don Cameron	Member for Fadden; 1983–1984	Succeeded by David Jull
New division	Member for Rankin; 1984–1998	Succeeded by Craig Emerson
