= Electoral results for the Division of Leichhardt =

Australian division election results

This is a list of electoral results for the Division of Leichhardt in Australian federal elections from the division's creation in 1949 until the present.

== Members ==
Member	Party	Term
Tom Gilmore	Country	1949–1951
Harry Bruce	Labor	1951–1958
Bill Fulton	Labor	1958–1975
David Thomson	National	1975–1983
John Gayler	Labor	1983–1993
Peter Dodd	Labor	1993–1996
Warren Entsch	Liberal	1996–2007
Jim Turnour	Labor	2007–2010
Warren Entsch	Liberal National	2010–2025
Matt Smith	Labor	2025–present

== Election results ==
=== Elections in the 2020s ===
==== 2025 ====
2025 Australian federal election: Leichhardt
Party	Candidate	Votes	%	±%
Labor	Matt Smith	6,900	36.11	+8.84
Liberal National	Jeremy Neal	4,539	23.75	−9.49
Greens	Phillip Musumeci	2,048	10.72	−0.45
One Nation	Robert Hicks	1,524	7.98	−0.30
Legalise Cannabis	Nicholas James Nigel Daniels	1,396	7.31	+7.31
Katter's Australian	Daniel Collins	1,247	6.53	+0.47
Trumpet of Patriots	Greg Dowling	450	2.36	+1.78
Family First	Les Searle	426	2.23	+2.23
Independent	Norman Miller	362	1.89	+1.89
Libertarian	Lloyd Russell	216	1.13	+1.13
Total formal votes		19,108	92.61	+0.30
Informal votes		1,524	7.39	−0.30
Turnout		20,632	16.80	

Results are not final. Last updated on 3 May 2025 at 8:15 PM AEST.

==== 2022 ====
2022 Australian federal election: Leichhardt
Party	Candidate	Votes	%	±%
Liberal National	Warren Entsch	33,652	36.70	−0.89
Labor	Elida Faith	25,312	27.60	−1.19
Greens	Phillip Musumeci	9,143	9.97	−0.43
One Nation	Geena Court	6,822	7.44	+1.39
Katter's Australian	Rod Jensen	5,166	5.63	−2.52
Socialist Alliance	Pat O'Shane	3,729	4.07	+4.07
United Australia	Daniel Hannagan	3,593	3.92	−0.05
Informed Medical Options	Silvia Mogorovich	1,641	1.79	+1.79
Animal Justice	Susanne Bayly	1,253	1.37	+1.37
Fusion	Adam Cropp	930	1.01	+1.01
Federation	Paul Roe	466	0.51	+0.51
Total formal votes		91,707	93.18	−0.40
Informal votes		6,715	6.82	+0.40
Turnout		98,422	83.97	−3.68
Two-party-preferred result
Liberal National	Warren Entsch	49,010	53.44	−0.73
Labor	Elida Faith	42,697	46.56	+0.73
Liberal National hold		Swing	−0.73	

Alluvial diagram for preference flows in the seat of Leichhardt in the 2022 federal election. indicates at what stage the winning candidate had over 50% of the votes and was declared the winner.

=== Elections in the 2010s ===
==== 2019 ====
2019 Australian federal election: Leichhardt
Party	Candidate	Votes	%	±%
Liberal National	Warren Entsch	33,753	37.59	−1.94
Labor	Elida Faith	25,846	28.79	+0.71
Greens	Gary Oliver	9,340	10.40	+1.62
Katter's Australian	Daniel McCarthy	7,318	8.15	+3.87
One Nation	Ross Macdonald	5,428	6.05	−1.48
United Australia	Jen Sackley	3,562	3.97	+3.97
Independent	Chad Anderson	2,562	2.85	+2.85
Conservative National	Jo Ashby	1,976	2.20	+2.20
Total formal votes		89,785	93.58	+0.88
Informal votes		6,160	6.42	−0.88
Turnout		95,945	87.65	−0.14
Two-party-preferred result
Liberal National	Warren Entsch	48,638	54.17	+0.22
Labor	Elida Faith	41,147	45.83	−0.22
Liberal National hold		Swing	+0.22	

==== 2016 ====
2016 Australian federal election: Leichhardt
Party	Candidate	Votes	%	±%
Liberal National	Warren Entsch	35,066	39.49	−5.77
Labor	Sharryn Howes	24,939	28.08	−4.49
Greens	Kurt Pudniks	7,702	8.67	+2.08
One Nation	Peter Rogers	6,775	7.63	+7.63
Independent	Daniel McCarthy	6,096	6.86	+6.86
Katter's Australian	Brad Tassell	3,840	4.32	+0.03
Family First	Ned Kelly Gebadi	2,257	2.54	+0.35
Rise Up Australia	John Kelly	1,439	1.62	+1.06
Independent	Michael Newie	694	0.78	+0.78
Total formal votes		88,808	92.68	−1.87
Informal votes		7,012	7.32	+1.87
Turnout		95,820	87.85	−3.43
Two-party-preferred result
Liberal National	Warren Entsch	47,915	53.95	−1.73
Labor	Sharryn Howes	40,893	46.05	+1.73
Liberal National hold		Swing	−1.73	

==== 2013 ====
2013 Australian federal election: Leichhardt
Party	Candidate	Votes	%	±%
Liberal National	Warren Entsch	38,795	45.26	−2.14
Labor	Billy Gordon	27,920	32.57	−2.09
Palmer United	Bruce Gibson	7,326	8.55	+8.55
Greens	Johanna Kloot	5,646	6.59	−2.47
Katter's Australian	George Ryan	3,677	4.29	+4.29
Family First	Frank Miles	1,876	2.19	+0.36
Rise Up Australia	Dale Edwards	476	0.56	+0.56
Total formal votes		85,716	94.55	+0.46
Informal votes		4,939	5.45	−0.46
Turnout		90,655	91.20	+0.10
Two-party-preferred result
Liberal National	Warren Entsch	47,725	55.68	+1.13
Labor	Billy Gordon	37,991	44.32	−1.13
Liberal National hold		Swing	+1.13	

==== 2010 ====
2010 Australian federal election: Leichhardt
Party	Candidate	Votes	%	±%
Liberal National	Warren Entsch	37,828	47.40	+4.66
Labor	Jim Turnour	27,662	34.66	−8.37
Greens	Neville St John-Wood	7,232	9.06	+1.44
Independent	Jen Sackley	2,556	3.20	+3.20
Independent	Yodie Batzke	1,700	2.13	+2.13
Family First	Shannon McSweeney	1,461	1.83	+0.53
Independent	Steve Lane	1,373	1.72	+1.72
Total formal votes		79,812	94.09	−0.89
Informal votes		5,017	5.91	+0.89
Turnout		84,829	91.08	−1.38
Two-party-preferred result
Liberal National	Warren Entsch	43,539	54.55	+8.61
Labor	Jim Turnour	36,273	45.45	−8.61
Liberal National gain from Labor		Swing	+8.61	

=== Elections in the 2000s ===
==== 2007 ====
2007 Australian federal election: Leichhardt
Party	Candidate	Votes	%	±%
Labor	Jim Turnour	35,762	43.12	+12.08
Liberal	Charlie McKillop	32,187	38.81	−14.80
Greens	Sue Cory	6,219	7.50	+0.99
National	Ian Crossland	3,303	3.98	+3.98
Independent	Selwyn Johnston	1,448	1.75	+1.75
Independent	Norman Miller	1,090	1.31	+1.31
Family First	Ben Jacobsen	1,087	1.31	−1.38
Independent	Damian Bynes	917	1.11	+1.11
Democrats	Bridgette Lennox	472	0.57	−0.69
Independent	Tony Hudson	320	0.39	+0.39
Independent	Rata Hami Pugh	139	0.17	+0.17
Total formal votes		82,944	94.95	+0.95
Informal votes		4,416	5.05	−0.95
Turnout		87,360	92.67	+0.25
Two-party-preferred result
Labor	Jim Turnour	44,800	54.01	+14.27
Liberal	Charlie McKillop	38,144	45.99	−14.27
Labor gain from Liberal		Swing	+14.27	

==== 2004 ====
2004 Australian federal election: Leichhardt
Party	Candidate	Votes	%	±%
Liberal	Warren Entsch	41,377	53.35	+4.59
Labor	Jim Turnour	24,305	31.34	−1.83
Greens	Neville St John-Wood	5,020	6.47	+1.23
Independent	Jen Sackley	3,789	4.89	+4.89
Family First	Ric Lippmann	2,100	2.71	+2.71
Democrats	Allen Reid	972	1.25	−2.31
Total formal votes		77,563	93.97	−0.11
Informal votes		4,976	6.03	+0.11
Turnout		82,539	91.16	−2.89
Two-party-preferred result
Liberal	Warren Entsch	46,541	60.00	+3.61
Labor	Jim Turnour	31,022	40.00	−3.61
Liberal hold		Swing	+3.61	

==== 2001 ====
2001 Australian federal election: Leichhardt
Party	Candidate	Votes	%	±%
Liberal	Warren Entsch	36,215	48.76	+7.31
Labor	Matt Trezise	24,636	33.17	−3.80
One Nation	Thomas East	6,324	8.51	−5.38
Greens	Jonathan Metcalfe	3,890	5.24	+2.35
Democrats	Harold Salier	2,643	3.56	+0.41
Independent	Rata Hami Pugh	561	0.76	+0.51
Total formal votes		74,269	94.08	−1.96
Informal votes		4,672	5.92	+1.96
Turnout		78,941	93.45	
Two-party-preferred result
Liberal	Warren Entsch	41,884	56.39	+2.34
Labor	Matt Trezise	32,385	43.61	−2.34
Liberal hold		Swing	+2.34	

=== Elections in the 1990s ===
==== 1998 ====
1998 Australian federal election: Leichhardt
Party	Candidate	Votes	%	±%
Liberal	Warren Entsch	29,550	41.45	+9.36
Labor	Chris Lewis	26,361	36.98	−1.48
One Nation	Beth Hudson	9,904	13.89	+13.89
Democrats	Harold Salier	2,243	3.15	−1.64
Greens	Steven Nowakowski	2,056	2.88	+0.00
Independent	Steve Dimitriou	522	0.73	−0.44
Independent	Rob Kenyon	267	0.37	+0.37
Independent	Trudy Alberts	218	0.31	+0.31
Independent	Rata Hami Pugh	173	0.24	+0.24
Total formal votes		71,294	96.04	−1.13
Informal votes		2,938	3.96	+1.13
Turnout		74,232	91.97	−0.35
Two-party-preferred result
Liberal	Warren Entsch	38,535	54.05	−0.52
Labor	Chris Lewis	32,759	45.95	+0.52
Liberal hold		Swing	−0.52	

==== 1996 ====
1996 Australian federal election: Leichhardt
Party	Candidate	Votes	%	±%
Labor	Peter Dodd	28,392	38.05	−3.91
Liberal	Warren Entsch	23,721	31.79	+0.20
National	Bob Burgess	15,236	20.42	+6.41
Democrats	Leonie Watson	3,578	4.80	−0.41
Greens	Pat Daly	2,081	2.79	−0.73
Independent	Steve Dimitriou	871	1.17	+1.17
Indigenous Peoples	Jeanette Simpson	387	0.52	+0.52
Natural Law	Margaret Leviston	352	0.47	−0.71
Total formal votes		74,618	97.12	+0.41
Informal votes		2,213	2.88	−0.41
Turnout		76,831	92.32	−1.07
Two-party-preferred result
Liberal	Warren Entsch	40,332	54.18	+5.51
Labor	Peter Dodd	34,102	45.82	−5.51
Liberal gain from Labor		Swing	+5.51	

==== 1993 ====
1993 Australian federal election: Leichhardt
Party	Candidate	Votes	%	±%
Labor	Peter Dodd	29,129	41.96	−2.44
Liberal	Bill Cummings	21,930	31.59	+8.81
National	Ben Wilson	9,722	14.00	−6.00
Democrats	Giselle Thomas	3,613	5.20	−6.05
Greens	Henrietta Fourmile	2,446	3.52	+3.52
Confederate Action	Gavin Roberts	998	1.44	+1.44
Natural Law	Dorothy McKenzie	817	1.18	+1.18
Independent	Jim Cavill	386	0.56	+0.56
Independent	Stephen Piper	380	0.55	+0.55
Total formal votes		69,421	96.71	−0.75
Informal votes		2,363	3.29	+0.75
Turnout		71,784	93.39	
Two-party-preferred result
Labor	Peter Dodd	35,575	51.32	−2.42
Liberal	Bill Cummings	33,742	48.68	+2.42
Labor hold		Swing	−2.42	

==== 1990 ====
1990 Australian federal election: Leichhardt
Party	Candidate	Votes	%	±%
Labor	John Gayler	31,318	44.5	−6.3
Liberal	Bill Cummings	15,985	22.7	+13.1
National	Kevin Byrne	14,553	20.7	−15.6
Democrats	Jim Downey	7,382	10.5	+7.1
Independent	Jim Waldock	1,148	1.6	+1.6
Total formal votes		70,386	97.5	
Informal votes		1,816	2.5	
Turnout		72,202	92.7	
Two-party-preferred result
Labor	John Gayler	37,606	53.5	−0.8
Liberal	Bill Cummings	32,727	46.5	+46.5
Labor hold		Swing	−0.8	

=== Elections in the 1980s ===
==== 1987 ====
1987 Australian federal election: Leichhardt
Party	Candidate	Votes	%	±%
Labor	John Gayler	31,601	50.8	−0.2
National	Kevin Byrne	22,551	36.3	+0.0
Liberal	Ronald Barry	5,942	9.6	+2.6
Democrats	Wilfred Tapau	2,085	3.4	−1.4
Total formal votes		62,179	95.6	
Informal votes		2,846	4.4	
Turnout		65,025	90.2	
Two-party-preferred result
Labor	John Gayler	33,747	54.3	−1.2
National	Kevin Byrne	28,430	45.7	+1.2
Labor hold		Swing	−1.2	

==== 1984 ====
1984 Australian federal election: Leichhardt
Party	Candidate	Votes	%	±%
Labor	John Gayler	28,256	51.0	−1.6
National	Eda Celledoni	20,115	36.3	−11.1
Liberal	Hugh Anthony	3,879	7.0	+7.0
Democrats	Cliff Truelove	2,675	4.8	+4.8
Independent	Daas Saba	463	0.8	+0.8
Total formal votes		55,388	94.3	
Informal votes		3,334	5.7	
Turnout		58,722	91.9	
Two-party-preferred result
Labor	John Gayler	30,726	55.5	+2.9
National	Eva Celledoni	24,662	44.5	−2.9
Labor hold		Swing	+2.9	

==== 1983 ====
1983 Australian federal election: Leichhardt
Party	Candidate	Votes	%	±%
Labor	John Gayler	35,071	52.1	+5.8
National	David Thomson	32,285	47.9	−1.0
Total formal votes		67,356	98.2	
Informal votes		1,251	1.8	
Turnout		68,607	91.5	
Labor gain from National		Swing	+3.2	

==== 1980 ====
1980 Australian federal election: Leichhardt
Party	Candidate	Votes	%	±%
National Country	David Thomson	30,105	48.9	+1.6
Labor	Anthony Mijo	28,500	46.3	+0.0
Democrats	Ian Paul	2,985	4.8	−1.7
Total formal votes		61,590	97.9	
Informal votes		1,308	2.1	
Turnout		62,898	92.3	
Two-party-preferred result
National Country	David Thomson	31,459	51.1	+0.2
Labor	Anthony Mijo	30,131	48.9	−0.2
National Country hold		Swing	+0.2	

=== Elections in the 1970s ===
==== 1977 ====
1977 Australian federal election: Leichhardt
Party	Candidate	Votes	%	±%
National Country	David Thomson	27,684	47.3	+9.1
Labor	Bill Wood	27,078	46.3	−0.2
Democrats	James Foster	3,785	6.5	+6.5
Total formal votes		58,547	98.6	
Informal votes		846	1.4	
Turnout		59,393	93.1	
Two-party-preferred result
National Country	David Thomson	29,803	50.9	−1.5
Labor	Bill Wood	28,744	49.1	+1.5
National Country hold		Swing	−1.5	

==== 1975 ====
1975 Australian federal election: Leichhardt
Party	Candidate	Votes	%	±%
Labor	Bill Wood	25,920	46.5	−3.1
National Country	David Thomson	21,318	38.2	−6.3
Liberal	Laurence Hoins	6,918	12.4	+12.4
Independent	Clarence Grogan	982	1.8	+1.8
Democratic Labor	Bernard Marsh	645	1.2	+1.2
Total formal votes		55,783	98.0	
Informal votes		1,134	2.0	
Turnout		56,917	92.4	
Two-party-preferred result
National Country	David Thomson	29,204	52.4	+5.7
Labor	Bill Wood	26,579	47.6	−5.7
National Country gain from Labor		Swing	+5.7	

==== 1974 ====
1974 Australian federal election: Leichhardt
Party	Candidate	Votes	%	±%
Labor	Bill Fulton	25,702	49.6	−8.3
Country	Herbert Marsh	23,072	44.5	+11.7
Australia	Robert Ellwood	3,049	5.9	+1.8
Total formal votes		51,823	97.8	
Informal votes		1,184	2.2	
Turnout		53,007	94.1	
Two-party-preferred result
Labor	Bill Fulton	27,609	53.3	−8.1
Country	Herbert Marsh	24,214	46.7	+8.1
Labor hold		Swing	−8.1	

==== 1972 ====
1972 Australian federal election: Leichhardt
Party	Candidate	Votes	%	±%
Labor	Bill Fulton	26,697	57.9	−4.4
Country	Walter Schulz	15,135	32.8	+0.9
Democratic Labor	Bernard Marsh	2,204	5.2	−0.6
Australia	Patrick Kelly	1,902	4.1	+4.1
Total formal votes		46,138	97.4	
Informal votes		1,208	2.6	
Turnout		47,346	92.8	
Two-party-preferred result
Labor	Bill Fulton		61.4	−2.1
Country	Walter Schulz		38.6	+2.1
Labor hold		Swing	−2.1	

=== Elections in the 1960s ===
==== 1969 ====
1969 Australian federal election: Leichhardt
Party	Candidate	Votes	%	±%
Labor	Bill Fulton	27,037	62.3	+5.2
Country	David Young	13,844	31.9	−5.6
Democratic Labor	Thomas White	2,526	5.8	+0.4
Total formal votes		43,407	98.2	
Informal votes		795	1.8	
Turnout		44,202	93.0	
Two-party-preferred result
Labor	Bill Fulton		63.5	+6.7
Country	David Young		36.5	−6.7
Labor hold		Swing	+6.7	

==== 1966 ====
1966 Australian federal election: Leichhardt
Party	Candidate	Votes	%	±%
Labor	Bill Fulton	24,639	56.0	−2.0
Country	Michael Turner	16,988	38.6	−0.8
Democratic Labor	Geoffrey Higham	2,395	5.4	+2.7
Total formal votes		44,022	97.2	
Informal votes		1,245	2.8	
Turnout		45,267	92.9	
Two-party-preferred result
Labor	Bill Fulton		57.1	−1.4
Country	Michael Turner		42.9	+1.4
Labor hold		Swing	−1.4	

==== 1963 ====
1963 Australian federal election: Leichhardt
Party	Candidate	Votes	%	±%
Labor	Bill Fulton	24,881	58.0	−8.3
Country	Robert Norman	16,895	39.4	+12.0
Democratic Labor	Arthur Trembath	1,158	2.7	−3.6
Total formal votes		42,934	97.3	
Informal votes		1,196	2.7	
Turnout		44,130	92.9	
Two-party-preferred result
Labor	Bill Fulton		58.5	−9.1
Country	Robert Norman		41.5	+9.1
Labor hold		Swing	−9.1	

==== 1961 ====
1961 Australian federal election: Leichhardt
Party	Candidate	Votes	%	±%
Labor	Bill Fulton	26,243	66.3	+19.1
Country	Reginald Wiles	10,839	27.4	−8.9
Queensland Labor	Arthur Trembath	2,485	6.3	−10.3
Total formal votes		39,567	97.2	
Informal votes		1,158	2.8	
Turnout		40,725	91.3	
Two-party-preferred result
Labor	Bill Fulton		67.6	+11.4
Country	Reginald Wiles		32.4	−11.4
Labor hold		Swing	+11.4	

=== Elections in the 1950s ===
==== 1958 ====
1958 Australian federal election: Leichhardt
Party	Candidate	Votes	%	±%
Labor	Bill Fulton	18,234	47.2	−2.7
Country	Michael Turner	14,021	36.3	−11.8
Queensland Labor	James Bidner	6,407	16.6	+16.6
Total formal votes		38,662	97.2	
Informal votes		1,099	2.8	
Turnout		39,761	91.5	
Two-party-preferred result
Labor	Bill Fulton	21,719	56.2	+4.5
Country	George Turner	16,943	43.8	−4.5
Labor hold		Swing	+4.5	

==== 1955 ====
1955 Australian federal election: Leichhardt
Party	Candidate	Votes	%	±%
Labor	Harry Bruce	18,512	49.9	−1.5
Country	Tom Gilmore	17,844	48.1	+1.4
Communist	Frank Falls	759	2.0	+0.0
Total formal votes		37,115	97.7	
Informal votes		860	2.3	
Turnout		37,975	92.1	
Two-party-preferred result
Labor	Harry Bruce	19,188	51.7	−0.6
Country	Tom Gilmore	17,927	48.3	+0.6
Labor hold		Swing	−0.6	

==== 1954 ====
1954 Australian federal election: Leichhardt
Party	Candidate	Votes	%	±%
Labor	Harry Bruce	19,044	51.4	+2.4
Country	Tom Gilmore	17,276	46.6	−0.5
Communist	Joe Howe	727	2.0	−1.9
Total formal votes		37,047	98.5	
Informal votes		576	1.5	
Turnout		37,623	94.7	
Two-party-preferred result
Labor	Harry Bruce		53.2	+0.5
Country	Tom Gilmore		46.8	−0.5
Labor hold		Swing	+0.5	

==== 1951 ====
1951 Australian federal election: Leichhardt
Party	Candidate	Votes	%	±%
Labor	Harry Bruce	16,827	49.0	+6.7
Country	Tom Gilmore	16,163	47.1	−2.5
Communist	Richard Anear	1,329	3.9	+0.4
Total formal votes		34,319	97.5	
Informal votes		867	2.5	
Turnout		35,186	92.8	
Two-party-preferred result
Labor	Harry Bruce	18,083	52.7	+4.4
Country	Tom Gilmore	16,236	47.3	−4.4
Labor gain from Country		Swing	+4.4	

=== Elections in the 1940s ===
==== 1949 ====
1949 Australian federal election: Leichhardt
Party	Candidate	Votes	%	±%
Country	Tom Gilmore	16,291	49.6	+8.0
Labor	Cecil Holdcroft	13,894	42.3	−11.2
Communist	Ralph Leinster	1,141	3.5	−0.7
Independent	Thomas Mackey	1,106	3.4	+3.4
Independent	Leslie Keough	424	1.3	+1.3
Total formal votes		32,856	95.8	
Informal votes		1,427	4.2	
Turnout		34,283	91.5	
Two-party-preferred result
Country	Tom Gilmore		51.7	+9.2
Labor	Cecil Holdcroft		48.3	−9.2
Country notional gain from Labor		Swing	+9.2	
