= Bush Pilot =

Bush Pilot may refer to:

- A pilot engaged in Bush flying
- Air Queensland, formerly Bush Pilots Airways, an Australian airline which operated from 1951 until 1988
- Bush Pilot (film), a 1947 Canadian-American film directed by Sterling Campbell
