= SCA =

SCA may refer to:

== Biology and health ==
- Sickle cell disease, also known as sickle cell anaemia
- Spinocerebellar ataxia, a neurological condition
- Statistical coupling analysis, a method to identify covarying pairs of amino acids in protein multiple sequence alignments
- Sudden cardiac arrest, a condition in which the heart suddenly stops beating, leading to sudden cardiac death
- Superior cerebellar artery, a major blood supplier to the cerebellum

== Computing ==
- SCA (computer virus), an Amiga virus referencing the Swiss Cracking Association
- Service Component Architecture
- Side-channel attack, in cryptography
- Single Connector Attachment or Single Connection Attach, an 80-pin SCSI storage interface
- Software Communications Architecture, in Software-Defined Radio (SDR)
- Static code analysis
- Strong customer authentication
- Software Composition Analysis

== Locations ==
- Seoul Capital Area, Korea
- Singapore Changi Airport
- South and Central America, a country grouping
- Southern Control Area, a Canadian airspace designation
- Soviet Central Asia
- Space Centre Australia

== Sports ==
- Simeon Career Academy

== Organizations ==
=== Commercial entities ===
- Sebastian Conran Associates, a British product and brand development consultancy
- Sony Corporation of America, holding company for Sony's American companies
- Southern Cross Austereo, an Australian media company
- Supercheap Auto, an Australian automotive parts and accessories retailer
- SCA (company) (Svenska Cellulosa Aktiebolaget), a Swedish hygiene products and paper manufacturer

=== Other organizations ===
- Bureau of South and Central Asian Affairs, in the U.S. Department of State
- Sabah Chinese Association
- Sarawak Chinese Association
- Schuylkill Canal Association, an organization that maintains a section of historical canal in Pennsylvania
- Scottish Canoe Association, the national governing body for paddlesports in Scotland
- Screen Composers of America, an organization co-founded by Jeff Alexander
- Secular Coalition for America
- Securities and Commodities Authority, a former name of the federal financial regulatory agency in the United Arab Emirates
- Sexual Compulsives Anonymous
- Société en commandite par actions, a type of corporation in France
- Society for Creative Anachronism, an international living history group
  - SCA armoured combat, a combat sport developed by the above organization
- Society for Cultural Anthropology, a professional association for cultural anthropologists
- Soviet Civil Administration, an administrative authority of the Soviet Union's military occupation of northern Korea, 1945-1948
- Student Catholic Action, a religious student organization in the Philippines
- Student Conservation Association, a non-profit conservation service organization in the United States
- Suez Canal Authority, a state-owned authority which owns and maintains the Suez Canal
- Supreme Council of Antiquities, the Egyptian antiquities service
- Supreme Court of Albania, the court of last resort in the Republic of Albania
- Swedish Committee for Afghanistan
- Swiss Cricket Association
- Sydney Catchment Authority
- Sydney College of the Arts
- USC School of Cinematic Arts, University of Southern California, United States

== Other ==
- McNamara–O'Hara Service Contract Act
- Senate Constitutional Amendment, the formal name for a type of California ballot proposition
- Shuttle Carrier Aircraft, two Boeing 747 aircraft modified to transport the Space Shuttle
- Small craft advisory
- Solar collector array, a type of solar thermal collector
- Spectrum continuation analysis
- Stored Communications Act, Title II of the US Electronic Communications Privacy Act of 1986
- Subsidiary communications authority, the Federal Communications Commission's name for subcarrier channels transmitted on a broadcast FM station
- Sustainable competitive advantage, a business advantage that is preserved over long term
