= AQN =

AQN may refer to:

- AQN (airline), a defunct Australian airline
- AQN (company), a Canadian power company
- Azimuthal quantum number
