= Dilyn =

Former UK Prime Minister's dog

- Species: Dog (Canis familiaris)
- Breed: Jack Russell cross
- Sex: Male
- Born: 2018; South Wales
- Owners: Carrie Symonds; Boris Johnson

Dilyn is a dog who lived with Boris Johnson, the former Prime Minister of the United Kingdom and his wife (initially girlfriend) Carrie during their time at 10 Downing Street. He is a white, male Jack Russell cross and was born in 2018.

The dog was rescued as a puppy from a breeder in South Wales by Friends of Animals Wales because he had a misaligned jaw and was going to be put down. The charity gave initial care to the puppy and named it "Dilyn", the Welsh word for "follow", in memory of a spaniel who had recently died. The puppy was then fostered in Merthyr Tydfil for a few weeks before Johnson and Symonds adopted him in 2019. The couple were introduced to the charity by Marc Abraham, the vet who successfully campaigned for "Lucy's Law", regulations prohibiting third-party commercial sale of puppies.

He formerly resided in the Prime Minister's flat in the complex of 10–12 Downing Street; Boris Johnson would take him for a walk early each morning in the garden of Number 10. The neighbouring former Chancellor of the Exchequer, Sajid Javid, watched out for Dilyn as he displayed "amorous intentions" towards his own cavapoo, Bailey.

On voting day for the 2019 United Kingdom general election, Boris Johnson took Dilyn to his polling station and so he became one of the many dogs at polling stations. After Johnson's victory, many newspapers around the world pictured him with Dilyn. These included Brazil's Correio Braziliense, Germany's Bild, Italy's la Repubblica, and the US New York Post, which had the headline "Conservatives Lick Labour" over a picture of Dilyn showing his tongue.

== Behavioural issues and controversy ==
There have been multiple accusations in the British press surrounding the PM's behaviour during Dilyn's tenure at Number 10. These include misuse of public funds, engagement in a turf war with factional civil service teams and the destruction of priceless historical artifacts. Boris Johnson has admitted bad behaviour on behalf of the dog, claiming "my dog is endless… on people's legs". Following Boris Johnson's removal as Prime Minister, his successor Liz Truss complained she "spent several weeks itching" after moving into Downing Street. She blamed this on Dilyn for causing an infestation of fleas, claiming "the entire place had to be sprayed with flea killer". Chancellor Jeremy Hunt later solved the problem after moving in by replacing all the carpets "at my own expense – vast expense because it had to be a security-cleared company that did it".

== See also ==
- Larry, Chief Mouser to the Cabinet Office
- List of individual dogs
