= Polling station =

Place where voters cast their ballots in elections

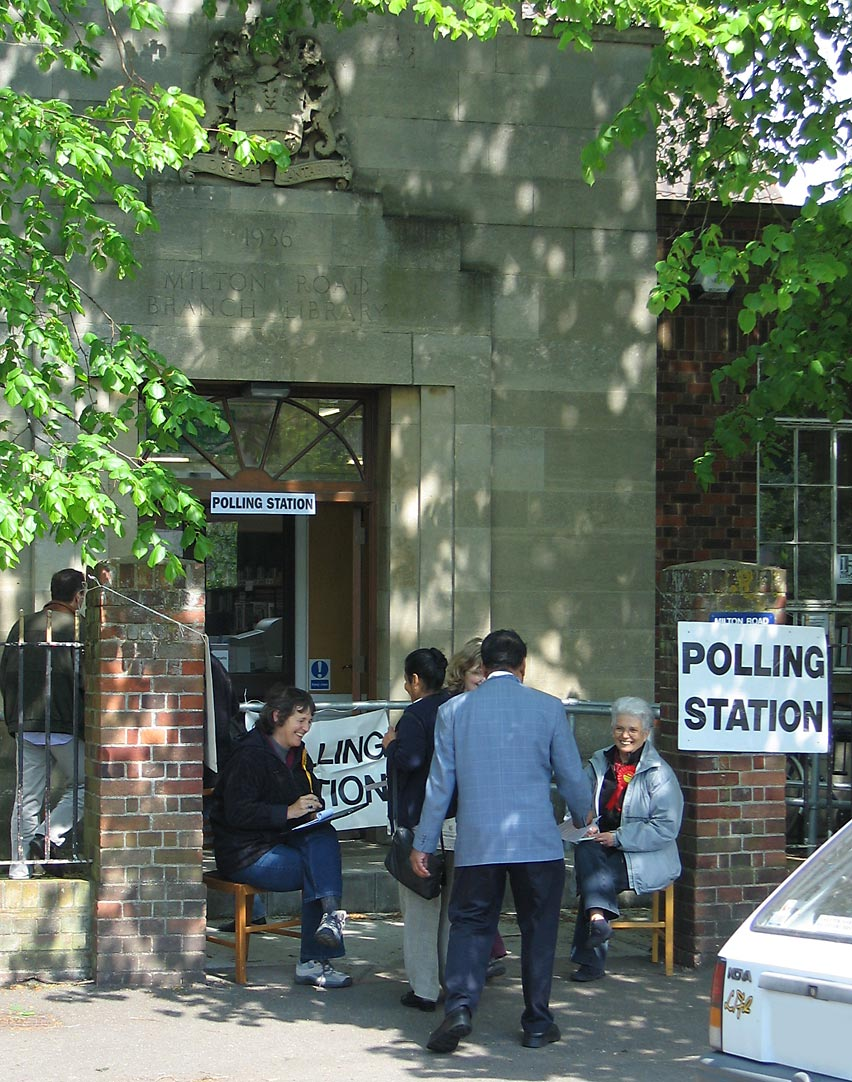
A polling station situated inside a suburban library in the north of Cambridge, Cambridgeshire, England, United Kingdom during the 2005 United Kingdom general election.

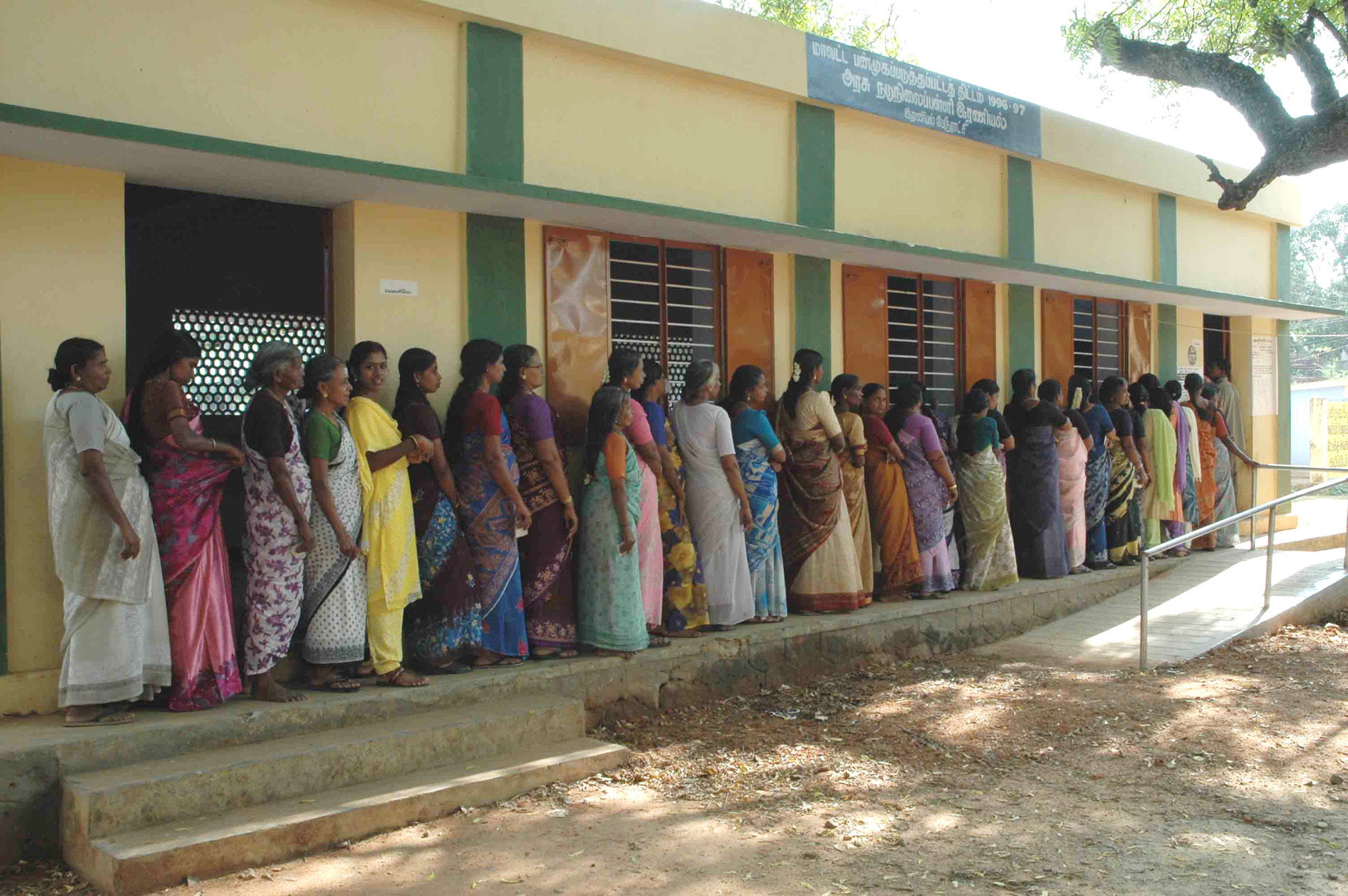
A polling station situated inside the Government Middle School, Eraniel, Kanyakumari district, Tamil Nadu, India during the 2006 Tamil Nadu Legislative Assembly election.

A polling place is where voters cast their ballots in elections. The phrase polling station is also used in American English, British English and Canadian English although a polling place is the building and polling station is the specific room (or part of a room) where voters cast their votes. A polling place can contain one or more polling stations. In Australian English and New Zealand English, "polling place" and "polling centre" are used. Americans also use the term voting precinct in some states.

Since elections generally take place over a one- or two-day span on a periodic basis, often annual or longer, polling places are usually located in facilities used for other purposes, such as schools, churches, fire stations, public libraries, sports halls, gyms, post offices, community centres, retirement homes, local government offices, metro and railway stations, hotels, banks, restaurants, fitness centres, and even private businesses and homes. The area a polling place serves may be known as a ward, precinct, polling district, or constituency. The polling place is staffed by officials (who may be called returning officers, election judges, or other titles) who monitor the voting procedures and assist voters with the election process. Scrutineers (or poll-watchers) are independent or partisan observers who attend the poll to ensure the impartiality of the process.

The facility will be open between specified hours depending on the type of election, and political activity by or on behalf of those standing in the ballot is usually prohibited within the venue and immediately surrounding area.

Inside the polling place will be an area (usually a voting booth) where the voter may select the candidate or party of their choice in secret. If a ballot paper is used, this will be placed into a ballot box in front of witnesses who cannot see for whom the vote has been cast. Voting machines may be employed instead.

Some polling places are temporary structures. A portable cabin may be specially sited for an election and removed afterwards.

There are five types of voting technologies that are currently being used in the United States polling locations. These comprise hand-counted paper ballots, mechanical lever machines, punch cards, optically readable paper ballots, and electronic voting machines. One of the reasons for a tendency toward witnessed final posting or transacting physical systems yet retaining the secret ballot is to reduce electoral fraud.

== Voting booth ==
Voting booths

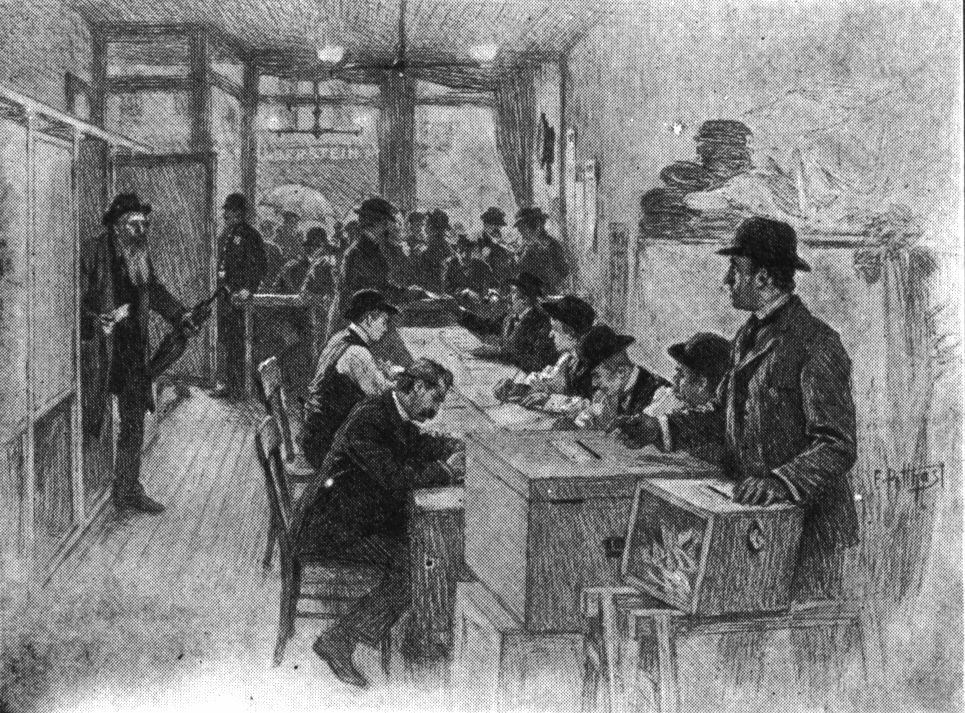
New York polling place c. 1900, showing voting booths on the left

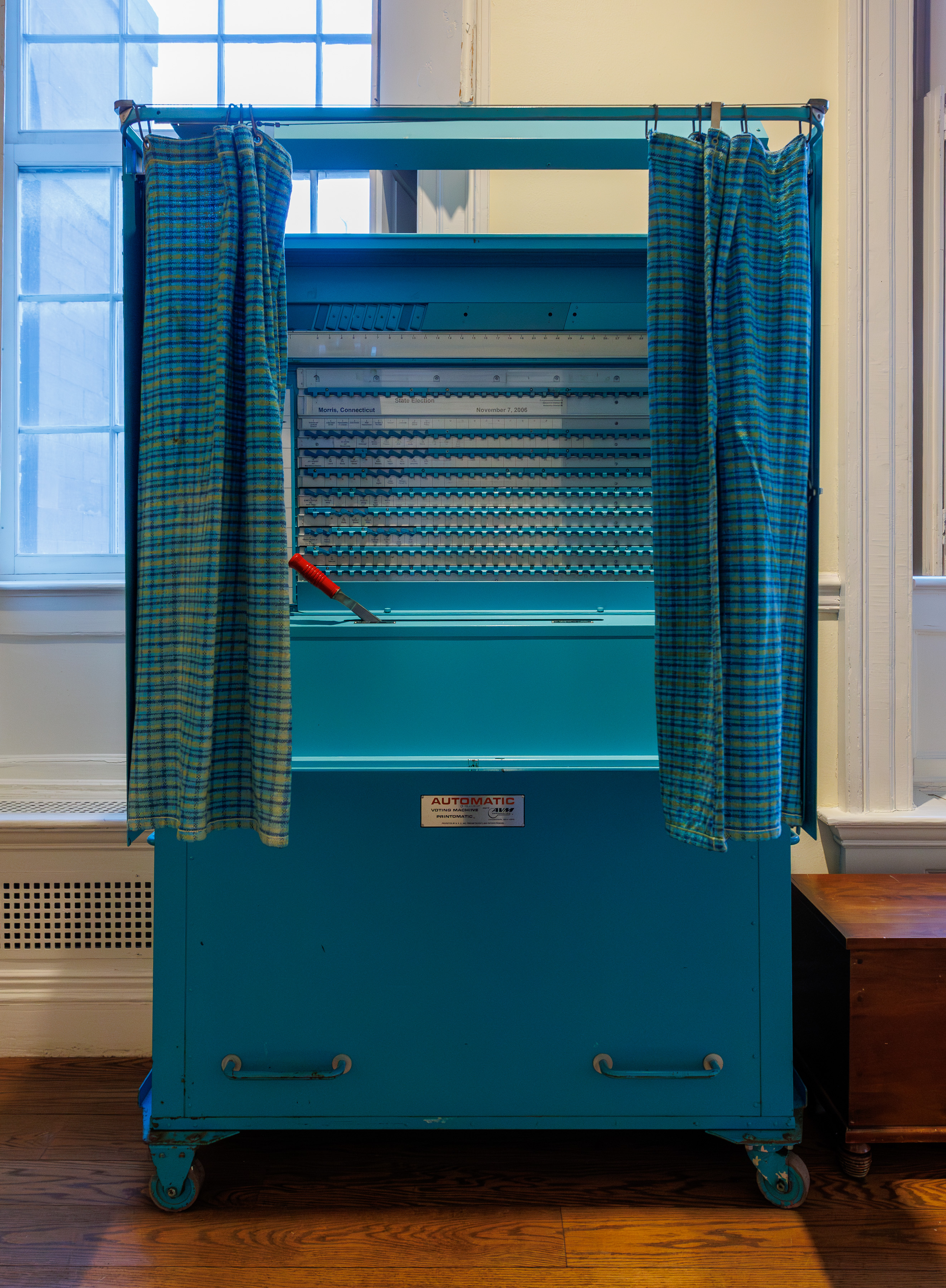
Voting booth from Connecticut, USA; late 20th century

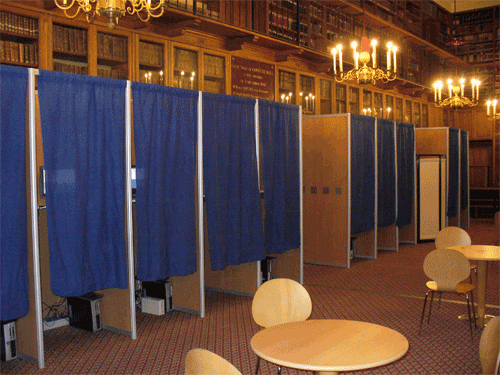
Voting booths used for L’Ordre des Avocats de Paris (Paris Bar Association) 2007 election

A voting booth or polling booth (in British English) is a room or cabin in a polling station where voters are able to cast their vote in private to protect the secrecy of the ballot. Commonly the entrance to the voting booth is a retractable curtain. (A collapsible desk or table provided by the facility, erected for the duration, with a large corrugated cardboard trifold on top as a screen, is used in most elections polling places across Canada.) Usually access to the voting booth is restricted to a single person, with exceptions for voters requiring assistance.

Voting machines generally use either a voting booth or some other form of privacy cover to obscure voters from the view of others.

== History ==
The word "poll" means "scalp" or "head". When votes were taken by gathering people together and counting heads, the place where this was done (sometimes an open field) was called the "polls".

Polling places used to gather and count ballots in elections have changed significantly over the past 250 years. Advances in technology have played a major role in changing the polling places because as the type of ballot changed, the venue in which the ballots are counted also changed. One of the main reasons for advancement was to be able to access the results quicker. First was the word ballot, then came the different types of paper ballots, and in the late 20th Century electronic balloting systems were introduced.

Before there were paper ballots, people would simply call out their selection at the polling place. This polling place was typically the county courthouse or town hall. Sometimes these polls were taken outside of the venue in a more informal fashion. When the voters came to the town hall to announce their choice, they would get in line to see the judge and swear in. Voters would swear an oath to the judge on a Bible and be allowed to cast one ballot per election. The judge acted as the only form of voter identification and it was up to them to be able to identify individuals that had already voted and exclude them from voting again.

The use of paper and electronic ballots have been the most widely used form of capturing votes in recent history. When paper or electronic ballots are used, the polling place must be professionally organised in order to ensure that the ballots are not tampered with and are accounted for accurately. These polls are held inside a building that has been set up in stations to assist voters. When the voter arrives, they will be asked to show a form of voter identification (Photo ID is required in most European countries and in some US states). Properly identified votes would go to a voting booth where the votes are captured. After all votes were captured, voters could examine the voting ticket before submitting the ballot to the poll worker, in a ballot box, or on the computerised ballot.

== Polling location effects ==
The building where the polling location is sited can have a significant effect on the results of the poll. Research shows that polling location may influence how a voter casts their ballot. This subtle unknown factor can be significant and can sway a close election. Individuals may be influenced to behave in a certain way based on environmental cues, i.e., an object or place that can influence a voter's behaviour; for example, the condition of the building, the name of the building, the ordinary use of the building, or the building decor. Researchers have spent much time considering what makes people vote the way they do; they have found that the smallest of changes can have large effects.

Waiting times at polling places have also been a problem in the US. This has become such a controversial topic that even President Obama in his State of the Union Address on 12 February 2013 mentioned the need to decrease waiting times. He went on to say that it is the duty of Americans to make sure that everyone has not only the right to vote but the opportunity to vote without having to wait several hours in line.

=== Building usage ===
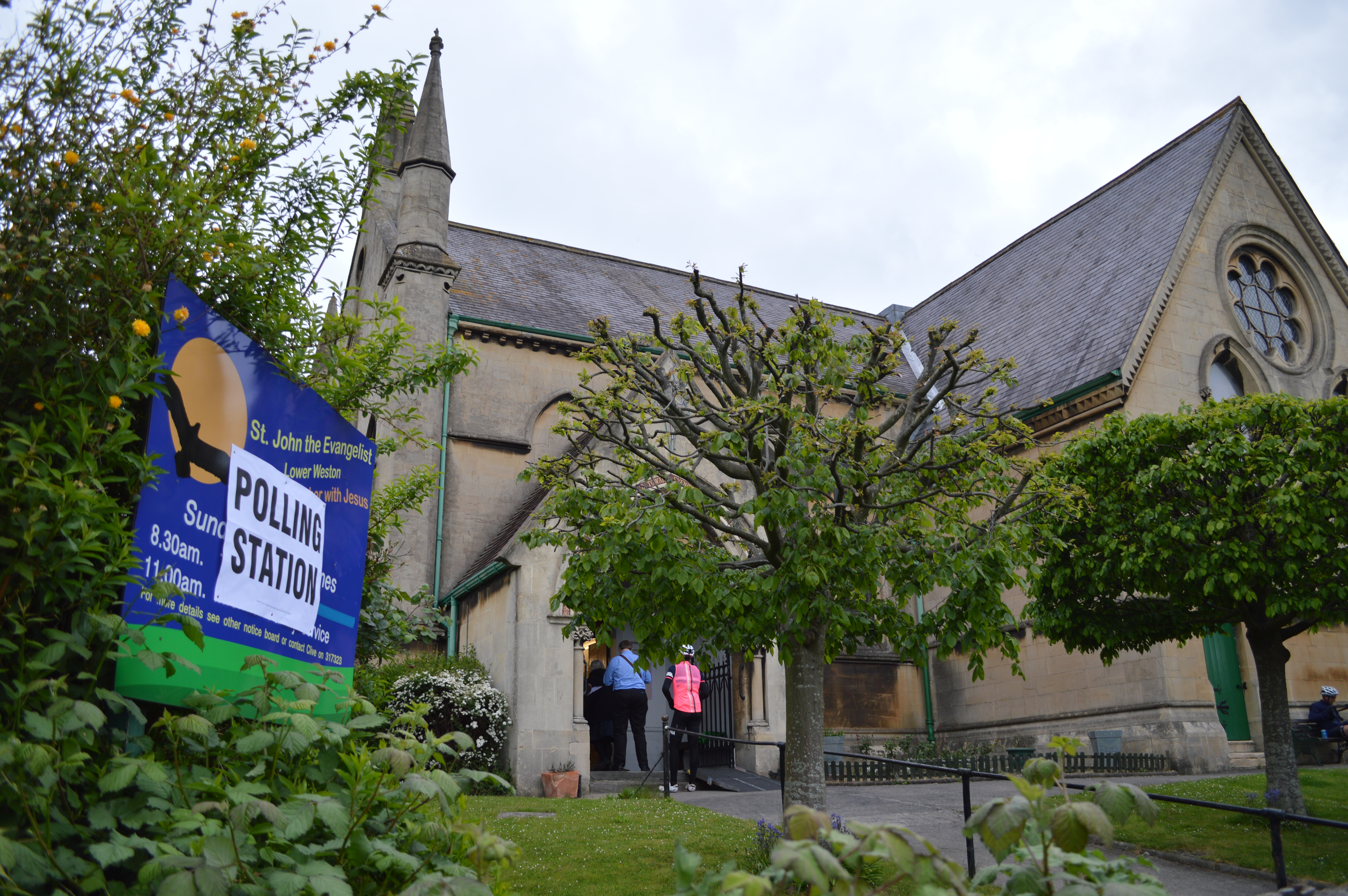
A church being used as a polling station in the 2015 United Kingdom general election

The building used as the polling place has a significant effect on how an individual votes. For example, voting inside a school building, a citizen might be more likely to vote for those in favour of school systems and education. This is especially true if the school building you are voting in is in need of general improvement and/or renovation. This environmental cue may give a voter firsthand knowledge of what needs there may be in a particular setting. Similarly, voting in a church or parish hall, a citizen might be less likely to vote in favour of stem cell research. These cues give a person a sense of satisfaction for voting one way or another in the moment, regardless if that was the way they intended to vote in the first place.

=== Distance to voting location ===
The cost of voting influences whether or not a person will vote. Research shows that the more expensive voting gets, the less likely a person is to vote. Distance to the polling location is one of the main reasons cost can become an issue for voters. Minor changes in distance from voters' homes to polling place can change the turnout of voters, which may change the outcome of a close election. Distance to the polling place is an issue if not every voter has access to vehicle transportation. According to the research on distance to the polling location by Haspel and Knotts, "To illustrate the range of the effect of distance, we plot our predicted probabilities at the lower and upper bounds of our continuous vehicle available variable. When no one owns a car (vehicle available = 0), the likelihood of voting drops from .664 at a distance of .01 miles [16 m] to .418 at the median distance of .69 miles [1,110 m]. When automobiles are universally available (vehicle available = 1), voters are much less sensitive to changes in distance: the likelihood of voting drops from .444 to .392 over the same distance range". Voters ultimately value the convenience of polling locations. If a poll is accessible to the citizen they will make an effort, if the citizen has to travel a long distance then voter turnout decreases dramatically".

=== Redistricting ===
If a voter changes precincts due to redistricting, then the chances of their continuing to vote in future elections decreases. The confusion that redistricting causes will deter the voter from looking into the new precinct where he or she should now vote. In addition, the informational costs associated with alerting voters of their new polling location will also affect the voter turnout because it is highly unlikely that funds will be available to allocate to ensure that every voter knows where to vote. Redistricting can be beneficial in order to provide a convenient location, but careful consideration should be taken before such a decision is made.

=== Openness and centralisation ===
If voters are allowed to vote at any of a number of different locations in the county or district etc., this will increase voter turnout. Sometimes, a voter's most convenient voting location is near their workplace, not necessarily the closest to their residence. Having a more open policy of allowing multiple possible locations for a person to vote would encourage those individuals who cannot feasibly commute back and forth from work to vote, assuming the day of election is not a mandatory day off. Having a large conspicuous polling location will ensure that the voters know where they are supposed to vote. This will cut down on unnecessary signage and eliminate clutter and confusion.

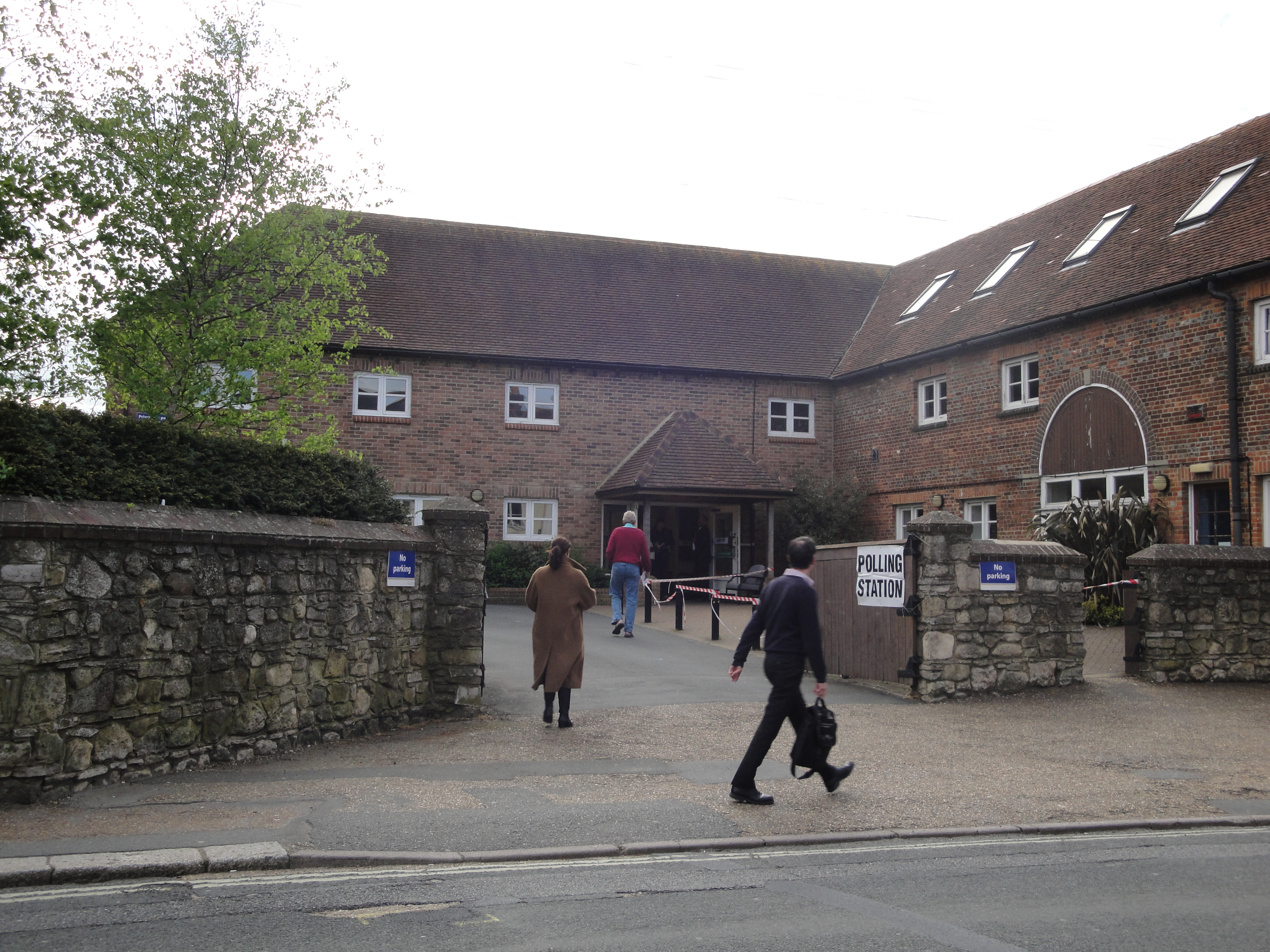
A polling station at a school for the 2010 United Kingdom general election

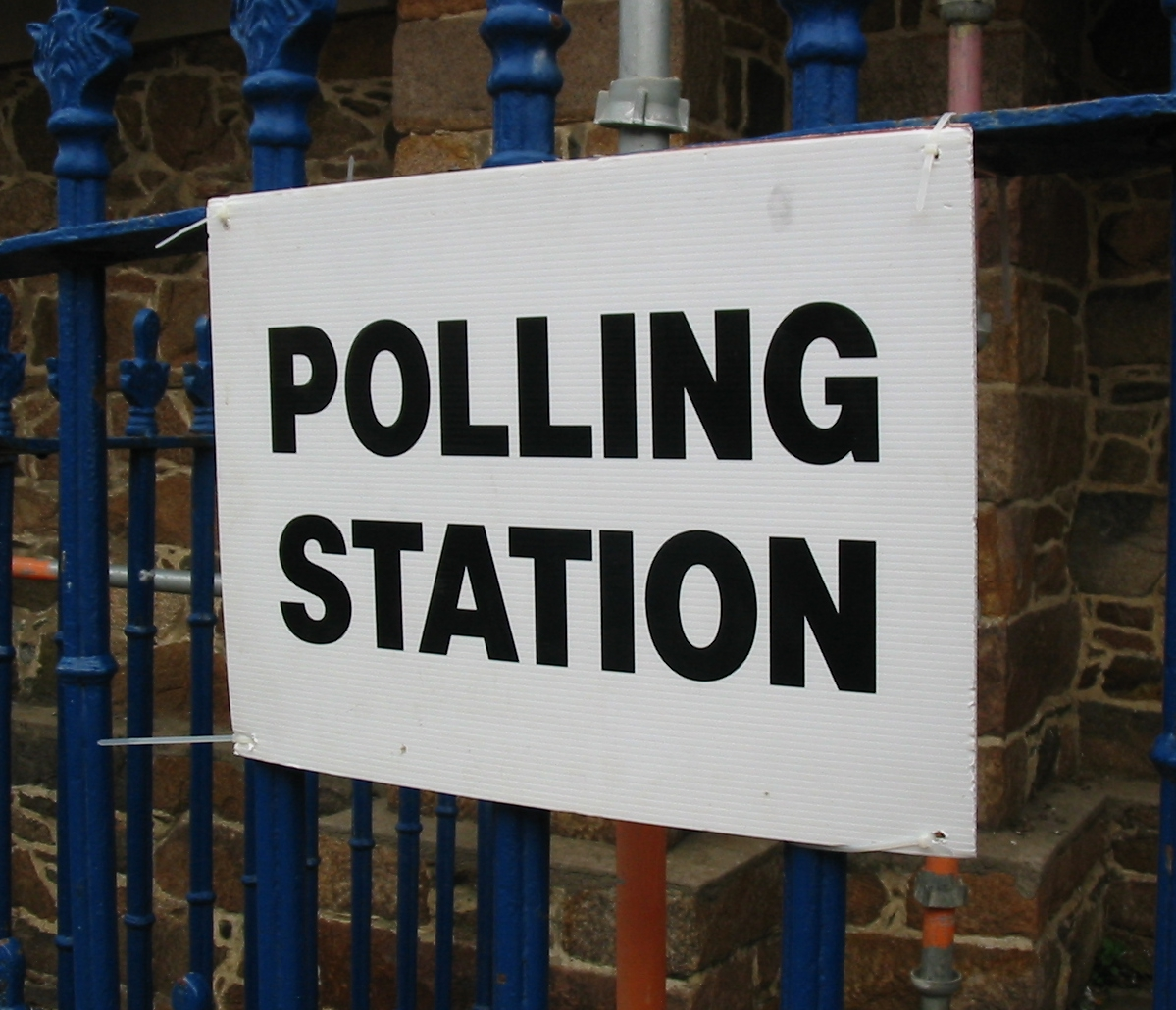
A polling station sign in the 2008 Jersey general election

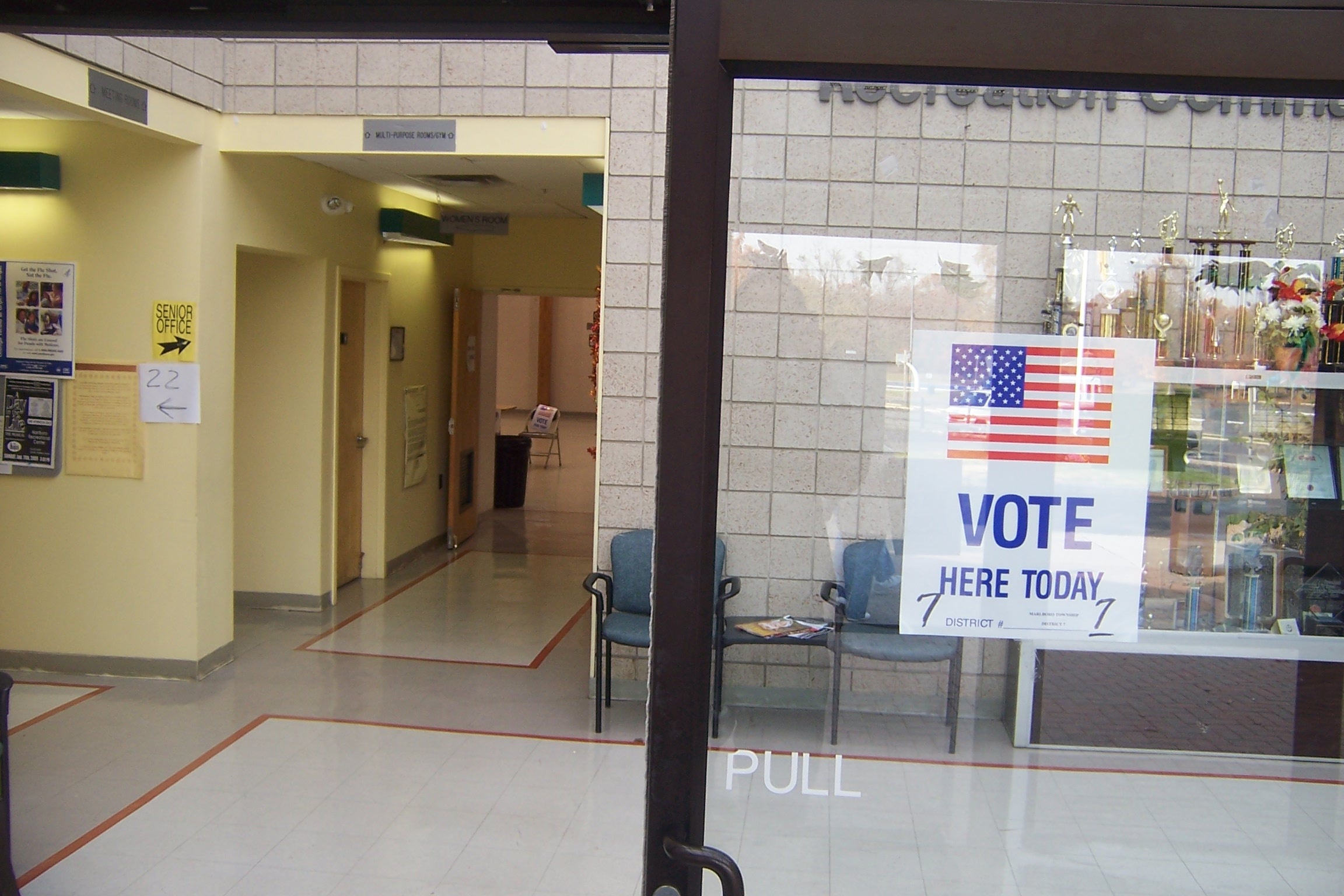
A polling place in New Jersey during the 2008 United States presidential election

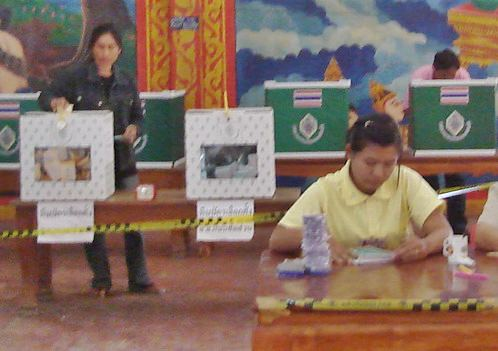
A polling station in Ban Khung Taphao, Khung Taphao subdistrict, Mueang Uttaradit district, Uttaradit province, Thailand, for the 2007 Thai general election

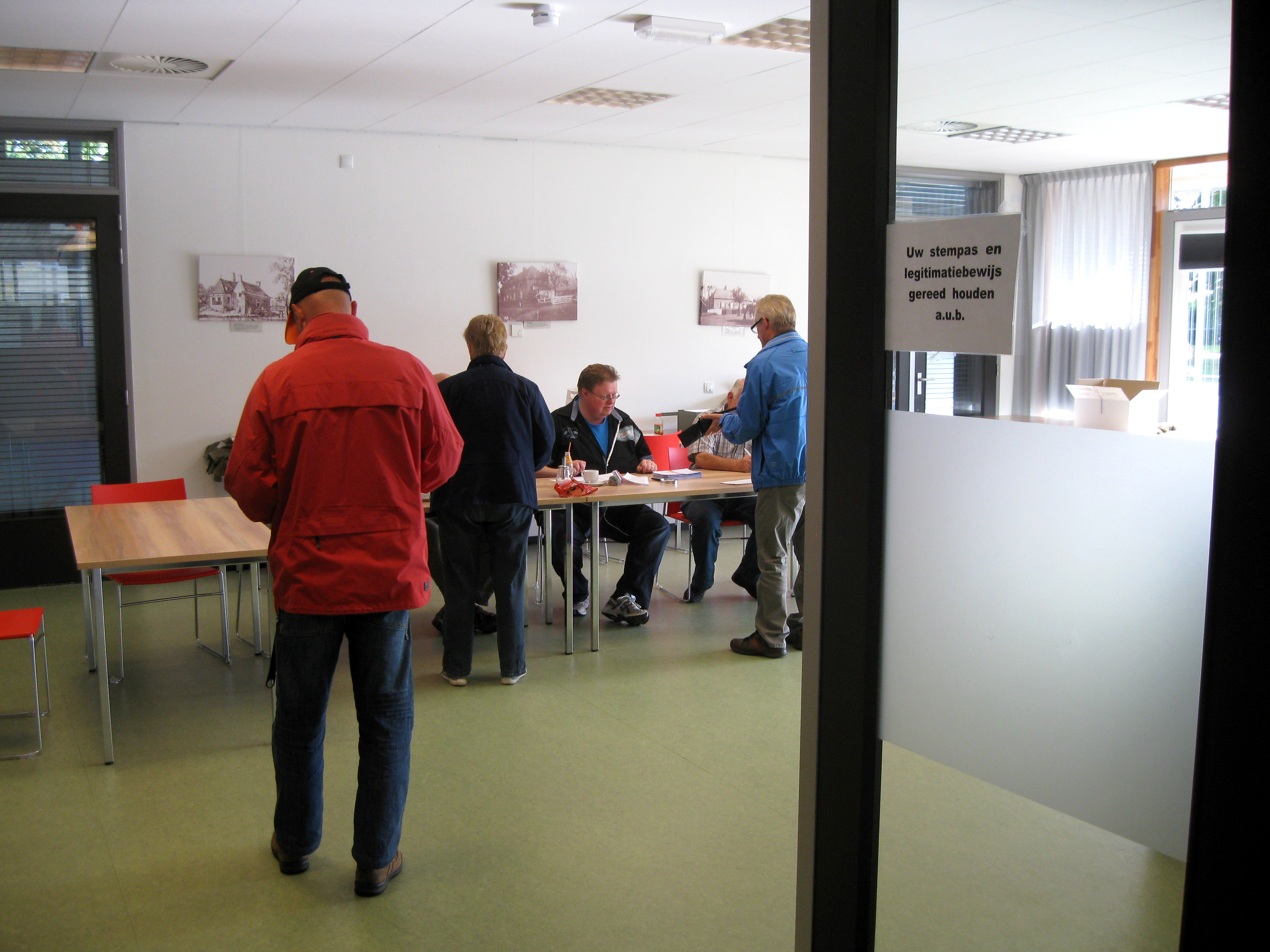
Polling place in a multi functional facility in Silvolde, a village in the East of the Netherlands

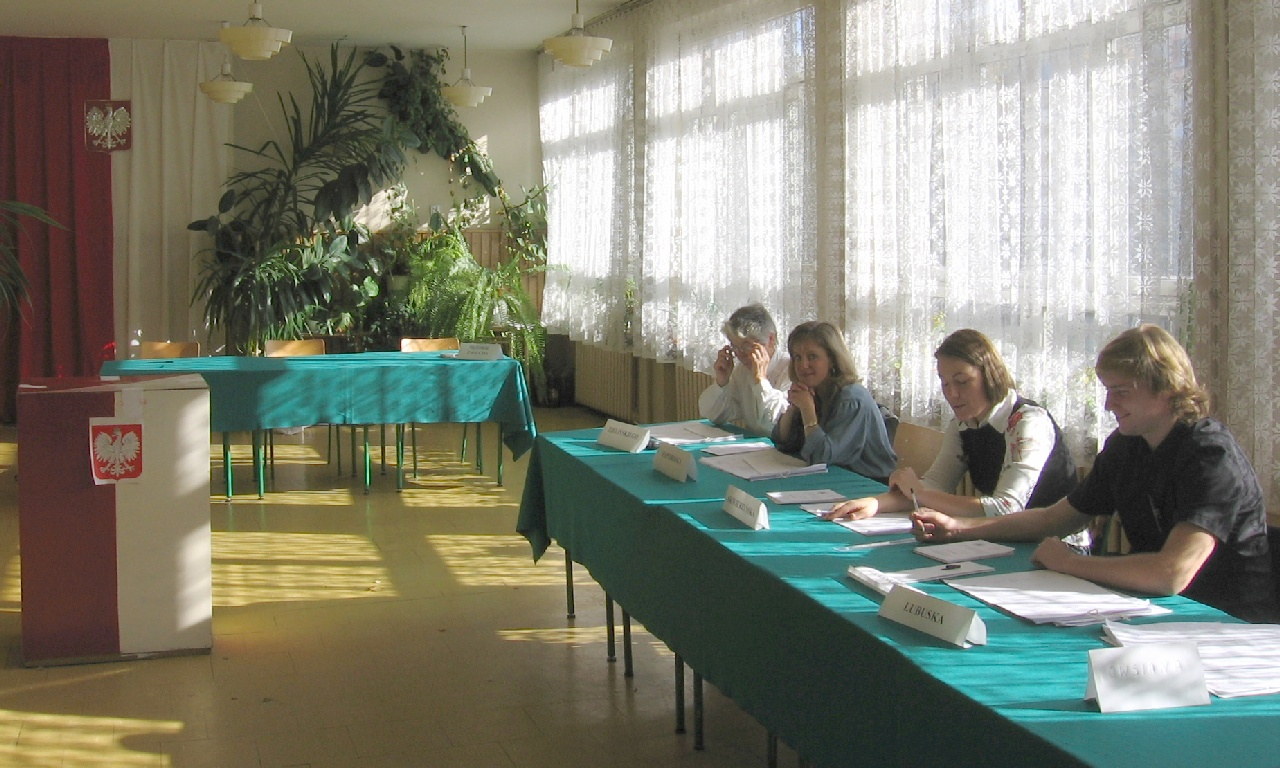
Interior of a polling station in Wrocław during the 2005 Polish presidential election

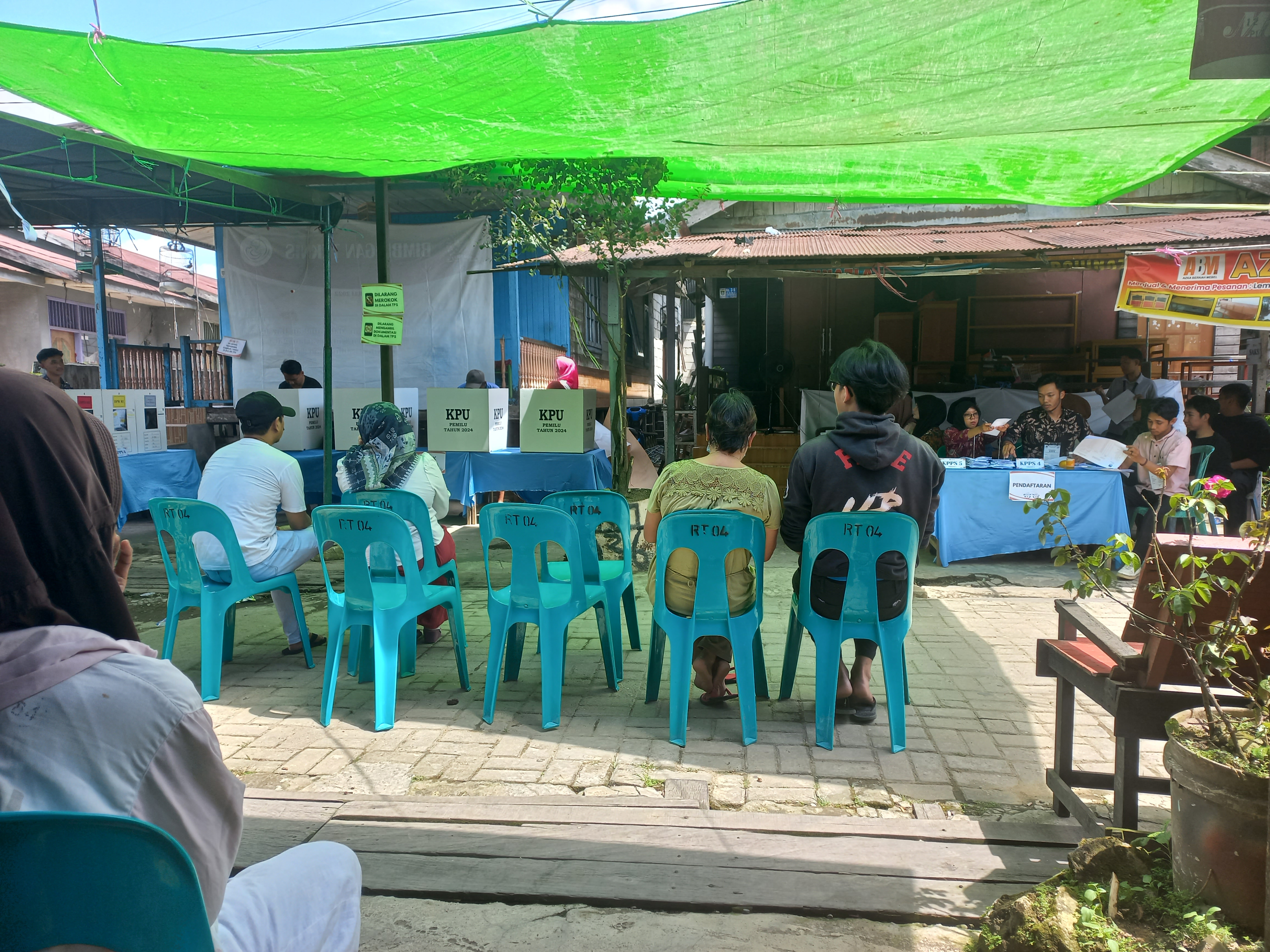
Polling station in rural area of Samarinda during the 2024 Indonesian general election

== Alternatives ==
=== Remote voting ===
==== Australia ====
In Australia, many voters in remote locations (such as many Indigenous communities) have their votes collected by "remote mobile voting teams" (RMVTs), which travel to remote communities via several forms of transport, generally in four-wheel-drives (4WDs), but also on light aircraft, helicopters and boats in many cases. For example, in the federal seat of Lingiari (the larger in size (but smaller in population) of the two federal electorates in the Northern Territory), where Indigenous people make up around 40% of the population, most people have their votes collected by RMVTs and thus there is low turnout on election day in Lingiari. In Lingiari, regular polling places are generally only found in major towns and cities, such as Alice Springs, Katherine and Tennant Creek. In contrast, in Solomon (the other federal seat in the Northern Territory, which includes Darwin and most of Palmerston), most voters vote at polling places due to their widespread availability. RMVTs are not exclusive to Lingiari or the Northern Territory, however; they are also used to a lesser extent in remote areas in the seats of Durack (Western Australia), Grey (South Australia), Kennedy (Queensland), Leichhardt (Queensland), O'Connor and Parkes (New South Wales).

RMVTs also operate for state and territory elections. In the Northern Territory, most people vote before election day, but those who do that live in remote electorates (i.e those outside Darwin, Palmerston and Alice Springs) have their vote collected by RMVTs, whereas those in urban electorates (i.e those in Darwin, Palmerston and Alice Springs) vote at regular polling places. In the seats of Daly, Katherine and Namatjira, the majority of voters vote at regular polling places but for those in the remote parts of the electorate, RMVTs do exist. In Queensland, RMVTs are used by some remote voters in the seat of Cook.

== See also ==
- Dogs at polling stations
