= Dogs at polling stations =

Hashtag and internet meme

A dog at a polling station for the EU referendum in 2016

Dogs at polling stations or #dogsatpollingstations is a popular hashtag and Internet meme on social media during an election in the UK and other countries such as Australia. Typically, the dogs are photographed waiting for their owners outside the polling station and the pictures then posted on services such as Instagram or Twitter. In the UK dogs are normally excluded from inside polling stations although assistance dogs are allowed and the local authority may choose to allow dogs in general in.

Under UK law, broadcasters are forbidden to report on election issues or campaign details while polls are open. News coverage is restricted to simple, factual information, traditionally including photographs of viewers' dogs outside of polling stations. Other pets that have been reported include parrots, tortoises, and snakes. The hashtag became popular in the UK general elections of 2015 and 2017.

The 2019 United Kingdom general election was held in December and thus many of the photographs had a seasonal theme such as showing the dog wearing a Santa hat. Politicians who participated included Boris Johnson, with his dog Dilyn, and Sadiq Khan with his Labrador, Luna. Ed Davey posted a picture of his family's guinea pig, Carrot, as they do not have a dog. Other animals, such as horses, also made appearances. Semiotic analysis of the photographs may indicate the political alignment or voting preference of the dogs' owners.
