= Bill Fulton (Queensland politician) =

Australian politician

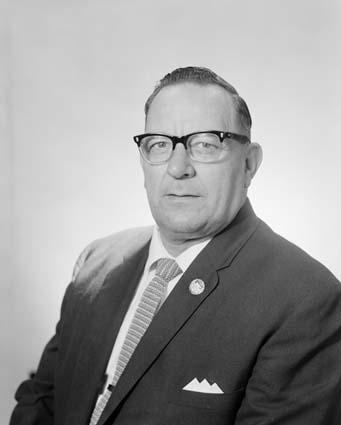

Member of the Australian Parliament for Leichhardt
- In office 22 November 1958 – 11 November 1975
- Preceded by: Harry Bruce
- Succeeded by: David Thomson

Personal details
- Born: 18 June 1909 Cairns, Queensland
- Died: 15 November 1988 (aged 79)
- Party: Australian Labor Party
- Occupation: Business manager

William John Fulton (18 June 1909 – 15 November 1988) was an Australian politician. Born in Cairns, Queensland, he was educated at state schools before becoming a business manager. He served in the military 1939–45. He also sat on Cairns City Council, serving as mayor 1952–59. In 1958, he was elected to the Australian House of Representatives as the Labor member for Leichhardt. He held the seat until his retirement in 1975. Fulton died in 1988.

== Resources ==
- An oral history by Pat Shaw, can be found at the National Library of Australia.

Parliament of Australia
| Preceded by Harry Bruce | Member for Leichhardt; 1958–1975 | Succeeded by David Thomson |
