= David Thomson (Australian National Party politician) =

Australian politician

The Honourable David Thomson MC

Minister for Science and Technology
- In office 3 November 1980 – 11 March 1983
- Preceded by: Himself
- Succeeded by: Barry Jones

Minister for Science and the Environment
- In office 8 December 1979 – 3 November 1980
- Preceded by: James Webster
- Succeeded by: Bob Ellicott (Environment); Himself (Science)

Member of the Australian Parliament for Leichhardt
- In office 13 December 1975 – 5 March 1983
- Preceded by: Bill Fulton
- Succeeded by: John Gayler

Personal details
- Born: David Scott Thomson; 21 November 1924 Sale, Victoria
- Died: 13 October 2013 (aged 88) Batemans Bay, New South Wales
- Party: National Party of Australia

Military service
- Allegiance: Australia
- Branch/service: Australian Army
- Years of service: 1942–1975
- Rank: Brigadier
- Commands: 4th Battalion, Royal Australian Regiment (1964–66)
- Battles/wars: Second World War; New Guinea campaign; Korean War; Operation Blaze; Indonesia–Malaysia confrontation
- Awards: Military Cross; Mentioned in despatches

Brigadier David Scott Thomson MC (21 November 1924 – 13 October 2013) was an Australian soldier and politician.

== Early life and military career ==
He was born in Sale, Victoria in 1924. He enlisted in the Australian Army in 1942, and graduated from the Royal Military College, Duntroon, being commissioned as an officer in 1943. He saw active service in the Second World War in the South-West Pacific, took part in the landing at Balikpapan, New Guinea, and served in Japan 1946–48. He was on active service again in Korea in 1951, where he was awarded the Military Cross. He served in Malaysia and Sarawak during the Malayan Emergency 1965–66. From 1967 to 1970 he was Director of Infantry and Regimental Colonel of the Royal Australian Regiment.

== Politics ==
From 1972 to 1975 he operated a tourism business. He was the National Country Party (later the National Party) member for the House of Representatives seat of Leichhardt, Queensland, from the 1975 election until his defeat by John Gayler at the 1983 election. He was Minister for Science and the Environment from December 1979 until November 1980 and then Minister for Science and Technology until the Fraser government's defeat at the 1983 election.

In 1985, David Thomson took part in an oral history interview for the Parliamentary Bicentenary Publications Project recorded by his son, historian Alistair Thomson.

== Later life and death ==
He died in Batemans Bay, New South Wales on 13 October 2013, aged 88.

== Notes ==
Political offices
Preceded by James Webster	Minister for Science and the Environment; 1979–1980	Succeeded by Robert Ellicott (Environment); Himself (Science)
Preceded by Himself	Minister for Science and Technology; 1980–1983	Succeeded by Barry Jones
Parliament of Australia
Preceded by Bill Fulton	Member for Leichhardt; 1975–1983	Succeeded by John Gayler
