= Space Centre Australia =

Spaceport complex

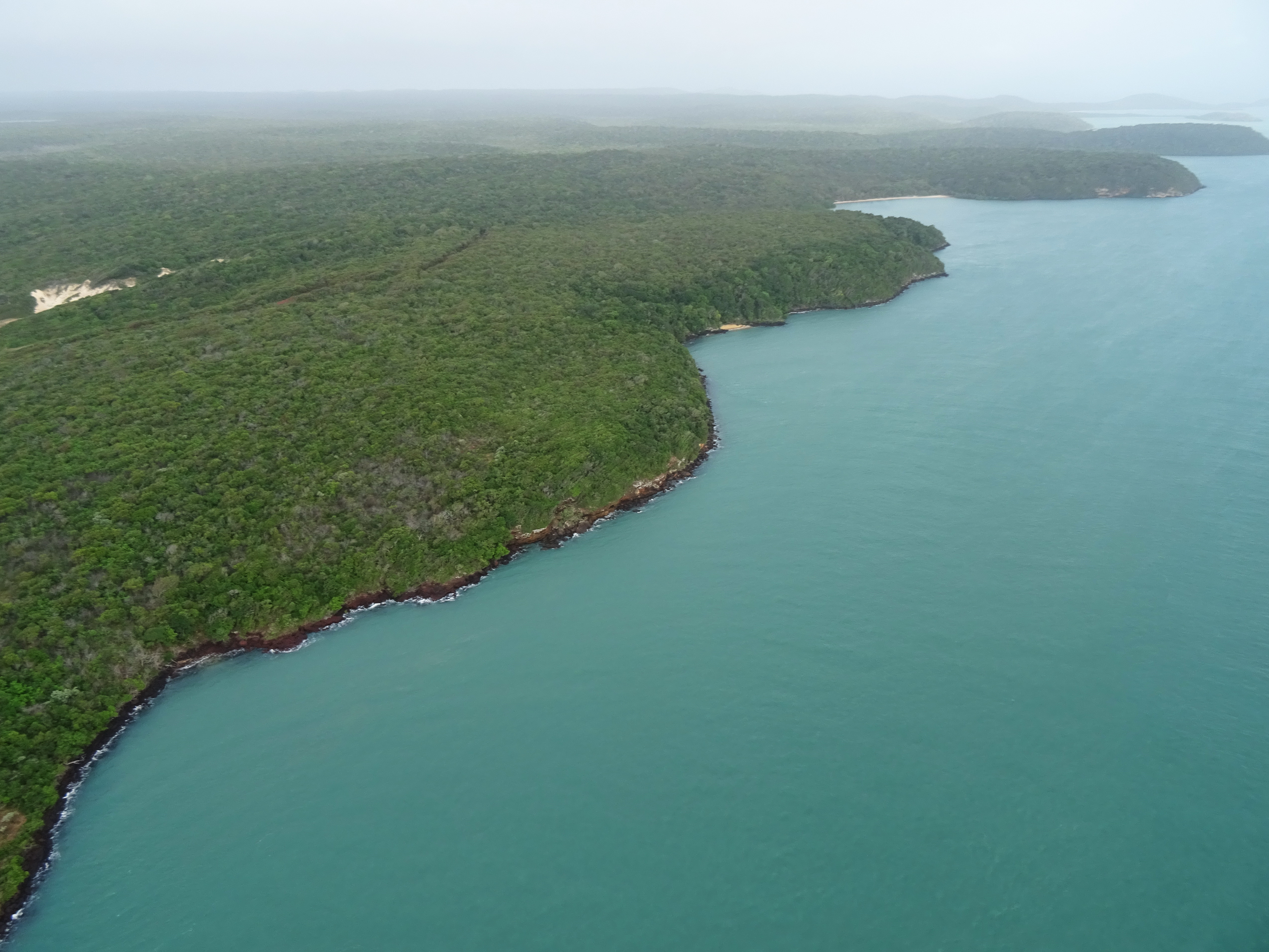
Pajinka, including Utingu, at the northern tip of Cape York Peninsula.

Space Centre Australia (SCA) is a spaceport complex slated for development across two locations on the Cape York Peninsula. Small-scale launch missions are expected to use the facility by the end of 2026, with larger operations beginning 2029. Once complete, its position in Far North Queensland may provide launch access closer to the equator than any other in the Asia Pacific region.

== Location ==
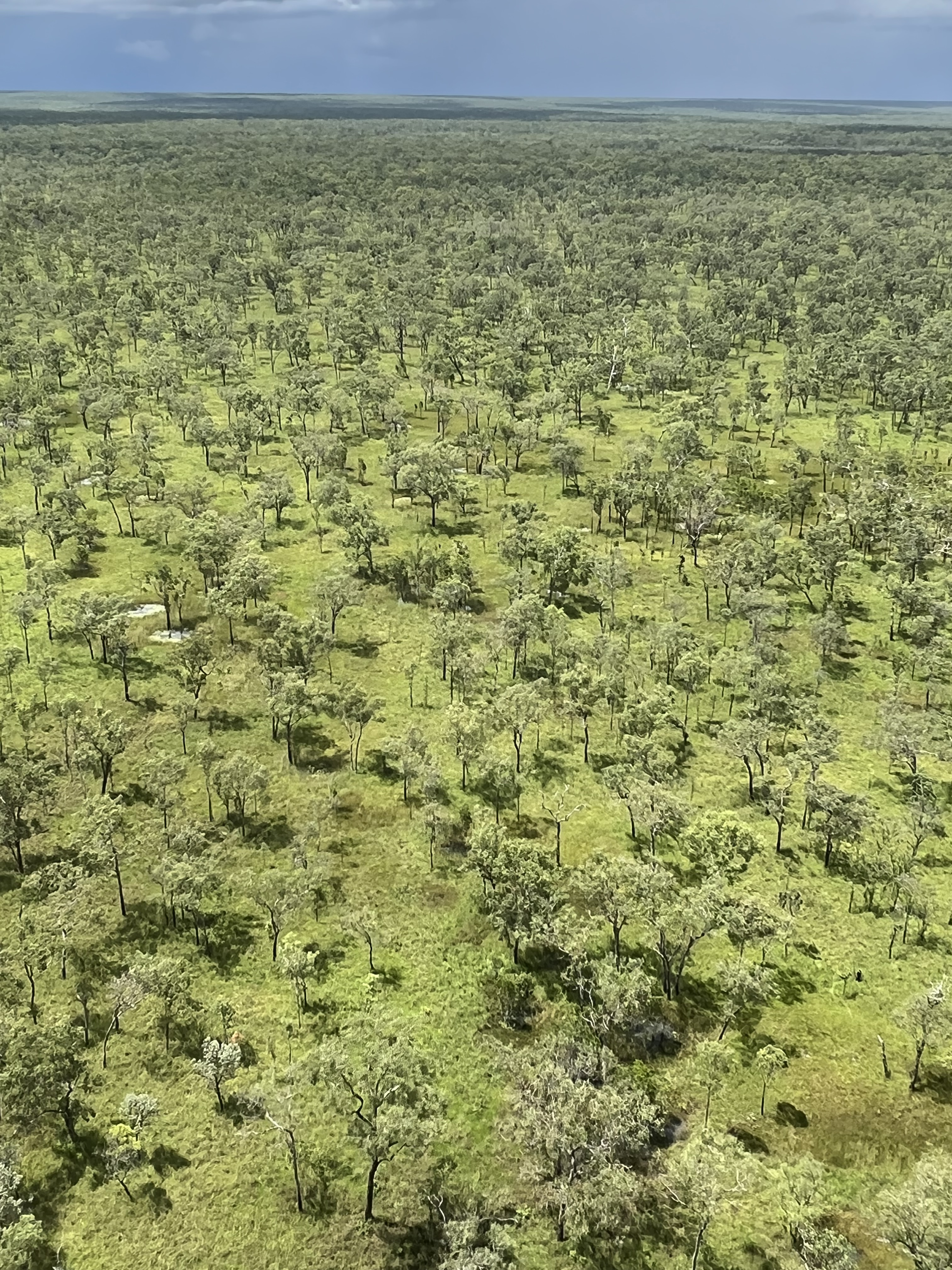
Location of the Space Centre Australia Primary Launch Facility, Cape York Region, North Queensland, Australia

The north of Cape York Peninsula has been recognised as optimal for rocket launch into space. It was first canvassed for aerospace launches by the Government of Queensland in the 1980s. The peninsula is close to the equator, stretching from 16th parallel south to 10th parallel south. A rocket launched here can take optimum advantage of earth's rotational speed, as it will already be moving at a speed of nearly 1650 km per hour relative to Earth's core. This makes launching a payload less expensive for space agencies. Like all of Australia's far north, the region is sparsely populated, with stable weather patterns, which some analysts regard as "ideal for establishing a sovereign launch capability." The planned locations are:

- Weipa, 43 kilometres east of the town of Weipa, close to RAAF Scherger.
- Utingu, on 88 hectares in Punsand Bay, in an area known as Utingua in Bamaga, 30 kilometres north of New Mapoon.

Space Centre Australia - Primary Launch Facility Location

== Planning and approvals ==
SCA aims to be Australia's first large-scale, multi-use spaceport; providing North to Easterly Low Earth orbit (LEO), Northern Sun-synchronous orbit (SSO), Geostationary Transfer Orbit (GTO) access to space. The project contains four principal development locations:

1. Cairns, Queensland Headquarters.
2. SCA Primary Launch Facility (PLF) located near Weipa, North Queensland.
3. Northern Tracking and Surveillance Site near Bamaga, North Queensland known as Utingu.
4. Eastern Tracking and Surveillance Site Near Lockhart River, North Queensland.

For the development of the Weipa PLF site, final approvals will come under Mokwiri Aboriginal Corporation, working with the Coordinator-General's office in the state government. The Utingu and Lockhart River sites are Freehold land and come under the respective local councils the Torres Strait Island Region and Cook Shire Council.

== Organisation and partnerships ==
Space Centre Australia is a privately held entity; its CEO James Palmer, comes from a military background. The development of the centre is dependent on the support of traditional owners, the support of political leaders and the interest of global space agencies looking for fresh launch facilities. This appeared to be established during an April 2023 meeting with the Australian Space Agency, delegates from NASA and the American Chamber of Commerce, along with Federal parliamentarian Warren Entsch who was reported as saying, "I started as a sceptic and I’m now an absolute disciple.” Significant partnerships up to 2023 have included:

- UK-Ukrainian company Orbit Boy; to develop an airmobile horizontal rocket launch system as announced by Ukrainian ambassador to Australia, Vasyl Myroshnychenko.
- NEWA Technologies Group; to develop orbital and ground based space and surveillance technologies.
- Gunggandji Aerospace—an Indigenous owned business.
- UK Australia Space Bridge.

Since the signing of the Technology Safeguards Agreement by President Biden and Prime Minister Albanese in October 2023, which provides a legal and technical framework for the handling of sensitive aerospace technology, SCA is reported to have been working with NASA, with a view to US space launches from Australia.

== See also ==
- Launch pad
- Spaceport, including lists of spaceports that have achieved satellite launches and launches of humans
- List of launch complexes
- Space industry
- National Space Program
- Australian Space Agency
