= Robert Norman (aviator) =

Australian aviator and businessman (1914–2007)

Sir Robert Norman OBE
- Born: 30 January 1914; Maryborough, Queensland, Australia
- Died: 3 April 2007 (aged 93); Cairns, Queensland, Australia
- Occupations: aviator and businessman
- Notable work: Bush Pilot Airways, became Air Queensland; Cairns campus for James Cook University
- Spouse: Betty Merle Kimmins (m. 1941)
- Children: 1 son, 4 daughters
- Awards: Australian Aviation Hall of Fame

Sir Robert Henry Norman OBE (30 January 1914 – 3 April 2007) was an Australian aviator and businessman, best known for establishing Bush Pilot Airways, which later became Air Queensland.

== Early life ==
Born at Maryborough, Queensland, Australia, on 30 January 1914, Norman was six years old when his fascination with flying was kindled. In 1920, a plane arrived at Maryborough, carrying a press reporter who was covering the Royal visit by the then Prince of Wales, the future King Edward VIII. Eight years later, Bert Hinkler flew into Maryborough; he had just completed the first solo flight from England to Australia.

After the death of his father when he was 16, the family moved to Cairns, Queensland. He worked at the local brewery for several years. It was during this time he met Betty Merle Kimmins, his future wife.

== World War II ==
When World War II began in 1939, Norman in his words "kept out of it until 1941 when our army was caught in Greece and Crete and thousands taken prisoner". He joined the Royal Australian Air Force (RAAF) and attended the Initial Flying Training School at Archerfield and the Elementary Flying Training School at Narromine. He married Betty Merle Kimmins just three weeks prior to his deployment while on leave, before heading initially to Canada for service flying training.

After further service flying training in England, Norman was despatched to No. 75 Operational Training Unit RAF in Egypt, which had been formed in December 1942 to train general reconnaissance crews using the Lockheed Hudson. Halfway through his training, the unit switched to the Lockheed Ventura. On completing training, he and his crew joined 459 RAAF Squadron operating in the Mediterranean. He served in this squadron with distinction, rising to the rank of flight lieutenant. Flight Lieutenant Norman led six Martin Baltimore bombers, one of two formations, from Marsa Matruh on a successful attack on the German headquarters on Rhodes.

== Post-war ==
At the end of his wartime service, Norman returned to Cairns and with Betty and his two brothers, established a dry-cleaning business. However, his passion for aviation remained strong. During his years of service, he had thought often of establishing his own company. He later said he got the idea for Bush Pilots whilst training in Canada after reading a local newspaper article about the pilots who flew to remote areas in that country. Determined to see that dream become a reality, he gained a commercial pilot's licence.

In 1947, Norman helped establish the North Queensland Aero Club, along with Frank and Neville Mitchell and Liana Sugden. The club initially had one serviceable de Havilland Tiger Moth and two crashed Tigers, which the members built up. The Tiger Moths were also used by the club's pilots to provide support to Cairns Aerial Ambulance.

It was a call out to a medical emergency on a cattle station west of Charters Towers in 1951 which set in train the realisation of his dream. Vera Anning, the wife of grazier Bev Anning, had miscarried. Norman flew a Tiger Moth to airlift Vera to hospital, but the flight back to Cairns was delayed for several days due to bad weather. It was during this delay that he and Bev Anning discussed the need for an outback emergency air service with an aircraft more suitable for transporting patients. Anning suggested an arrangement whereby graziers would put up the money and the North Queensland Aero Club would provide the aircraft and crews.

== Bush Pilots Airways ==
On returning to Cairns, Norman discussed the idea with his solicitor, Jack Bell, who advised a limited liability company would be a better option. A prospectus was drawn up, and in 1952 Norman founded Bush Pilot Airways. He, Jack Bell and Neville Mitchell were the first three shareholders.

Its first aircraft was a de Havilland Dragonfly, purchased from Adastra Airways Ltd in Sydney and flown by Norman to Cairns on 19 June 1951; it went into operation four days later. By the late 1950s, the company had 11 four-seat Auster Autocars serving isolated settlements and properties across Cape York Peninsula, North West Queensland and Gulf Carpentaria Queensland. It opened up much-needed air links between Cairns and the small communities of Far North Queensland, keeping them supplied when the wet season cut the roads. From its humble start with one aircraft, Bush Pilots Airways Limited grew to become a major regional carrier in Northern Australia. Sir Robert spent 15 years at the helm of Bush Pilots and acted as an honorary pilot for Cairns Aerial Ambulance for 25 years.

In the author's note for his book Bush Pilot (1976), Norman wrote about being a bush pilot:

… the greatest satisfaction of all was the realisation of doing something for others, and there was probably no other vocation in the world which offered more opportunities for giving service to our fellow men.

== Community service and honours ==
In 1958, he was appointed an Officer of the Order of the British Empire for his work during and after Cyclone Agnes, which devastated much of Far North Queensland in March 1956; he flew in treacherous conditions to warn communities about oncoming flood waters and later delivered food to those cut-off by the flooding. He was created a Knight Bachelor in 1989 in recognition of his outstanding community service.

He had a long association with James Cook University, advocating for the establishment of a Cairns campus. He received an honorary Doctor of Letters from the university. The tropical research facility "Australian Tropical Herbarium" (building E2) at Cairns Campus of James Cook University at Smithfield is named in his honour due to his commitment to bringing the university to Cairns.

Sir Robert and Lady Betty Norman contributed to many community organisations, including the Cairns Art Gallery (where the ground floor gallery is named after her) and the Coast Guard (with the Sir Bob vessel being named for him).

When he was posthumously inducted into the Australian Aviation Hall of Fame in 2016, it was said about him:

Sir Robert 'Bob' Henry Norman was known for pioneering work in aviation, founding Bush Pilots Airways and offering his services as an honorary pilot for the Cairns Aerial Ambulance for a quarter of a century. His vision and determination brought passenger services to regional, rural and remote communities Queensland post World War II – a legacy which is still being felt today.

== Death ==
Robert Norman died in Cairns on 3 April 2007 at the age of 93. As a tribute, the North Queensland Warbirds performed a flyover of the Cairns Esplanade following the funeral service.

Sir Robert and Lady Betty had five children: Robert John ("Bob Jr"), Betty-Ann, Wendy Joy, Julie Kristine and Lindy Jane.
