= Matt Smith (Queensland politician) =

Australian politician

Matt Smith MP
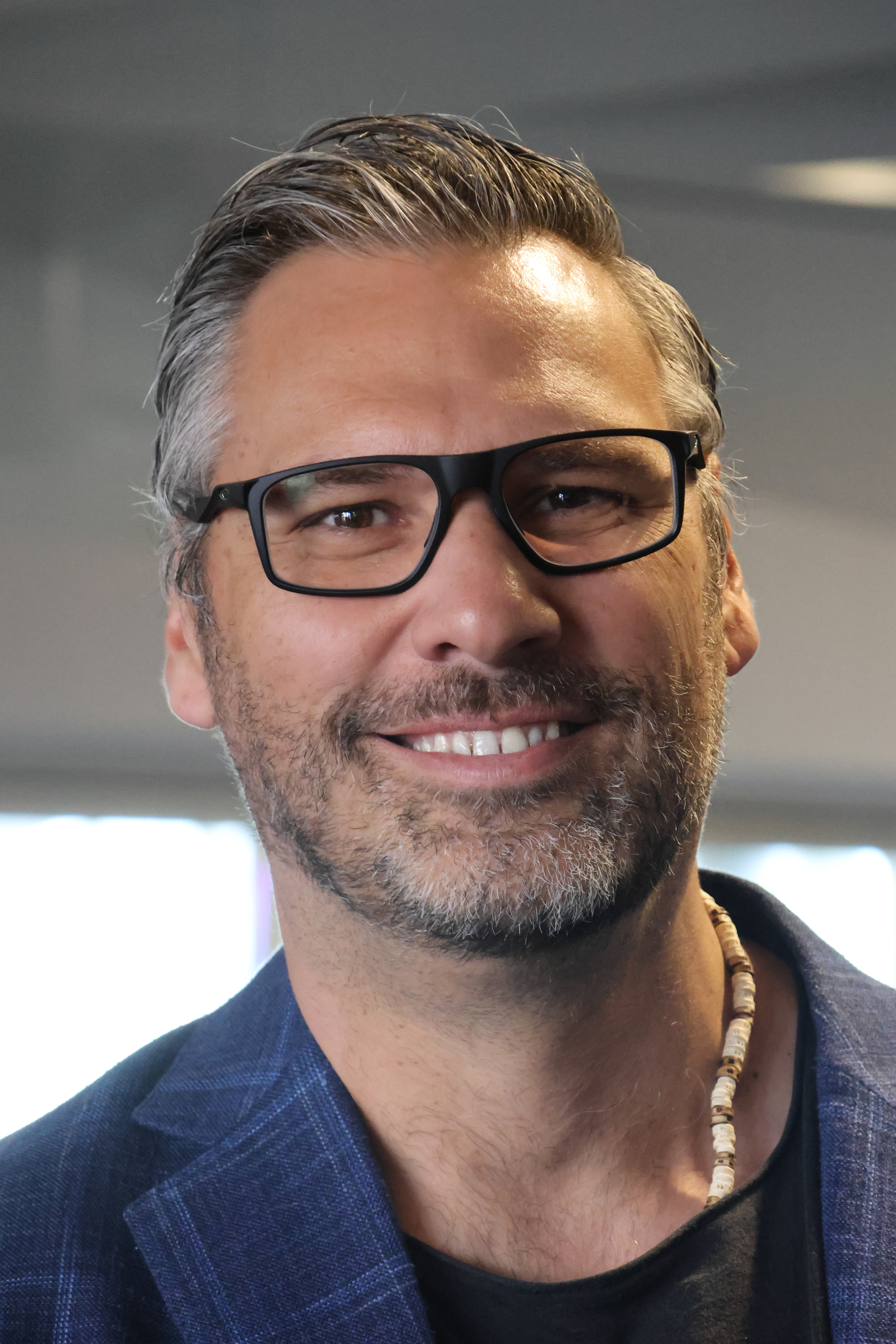
- Smith in 2026

Member of the Australian Parliament for Leichhardt
- Incumbent
- Assumed office 3 May 2025
- Preceded by: Warren Entsch

Personal details
- Born: Matthew Smith; 30 November 1979 (age 46) Sale, Victoria, Australia
- Party: Labor
- Domestic partner: Renee
- Children: 2
- Basketball career

Personal information
- Listed height: 210 cm (6 ft 11 in)
- Listed weight: 105 kg (231 lb)

Career information
- College: Fairfield (1998–1999); Lander (2000–2003)
- Playing career: 1999–2018
- Position: Centre

Career history
- 1999–2000: Wollongong Hawks
- 2000: Albury Wodonga Bandits
- 2003: Knox Raiders
- 2003–2004: Victoria Giants
- 2004–2005: Sandringham Sabres
- 2004–2005: New Zealand Breakers
- 2005–2009: Cairns Taipans
- 2009: Hobart Chargers
- 2013–2015, 2018: Cairns Marlins

Matthew Smith (born 30 November 1979) is an Australian politician and former basketball player. He played seven seasons in the National Basketball League (NBL) between 1999 and 2009. He was elected a member of the Australian Parliament for the Division of Leichhardt representing the Labor Party after winning the seat in the 2025 federal election.

== Early life ==
Smith was born in Sale, Victoria. He played for the Sale Sonics as a teenager. Smith has Indigenous Australian heritage.

== Basketball career ==
=== NBL and college ===
In 1996, Smith served as a training player with the Geelong Supercats in the National Basketball League (NBL). He served in a similar role with the North Melbourne Giants in 1997.

For the 1998–99 season, Smith played college basketball in the United States for Fairfield University.

Smith made his NBL debut in the 1999–2000 season for the Wollongong Hawks.

Smith returned to the United States to play college basketball for Lander University between 2000 and 2003.

For the 2003–04 NBL season, Smith played for the Victoria Giants.

In December 2004, Smith joined the New Zealand Breakers. He played four games for the Breakers during the 2004–05 NBL season.

For the 2005–06 NBL season, Smith joined the Cairns Taipans. He played four seasons for the Taipans, departing the club after the 2008–09 NBL season. At the time, he was the Taipans' record holder for blocked shots.

=== State leagues ===
In 2000, Smith played for the Albury Wodonga Bandits in the South East Australian Basketball League (SEABL). In 2003, he played for the Knox Raiders in the SEABL.

In 2004 and 2005, Smith played for the Sandringham Sabres in the Big V.

In 2009, Smith played for the Hobart Chargers in the SEABL.

Between 2013 and 2015, Smith played three seasons for the Cairns Marlins in the Queensland Basketball League (QBL). He returned to the Marlins for one final season in 2018.

== Political career ==
In July 2024, Smith was chosen as the Labor Party candidate for the federal seat of Leichhardt. On 7 January 2025, Smith, along with Prime Minister Anthony Albanese and Senator for Queensland Nita Green, announced almost $39 million for social housing and community infrastructure projects in the Cape York region in far north Queensland. Of the $39 million, according to the announcement, $24.9m would be allocated through the Housing Support Program package to boost social housing in the northernmost part of the state. On 3 May 2025, he was elected a member of the Australian Parliament for the Division of Leichhardt after winning the seat in the 2025 federal election. Smith is affiliated with the Labor Left.

== See also ==
- List of Indigenous Australian politicians

Parliament of Australia
Preceded by Warren Entsch	Member for Leichhardt; 2025–present	Incumbent
