= Peter Dodd =

Australian politician

Member of the Australian Parliament for Leichhardt
- In office 13 March 1993 – 2 March 1996
- Preceded by: John Gayler
- Succeeded by: Warren Entsch

Personal details
- Born: 31 October 1953 (age 72) Sydney
- Party: Australian Labor Party
- Occupation: Solicitor

Peter George Dodd (born 31 October 1953) is an Australian former politician. He was an Australian Labor Party member of the Australian House of Representatives from 1993 to 1996, representing the Queensland seat of Leichhardt.

Dodd was born in Sydney and graduated with degrees in arts and law from the University of New South Wales and in economics from the University of Sydney. He became a solicitor in New South Wales, working for Legal Aid and also serving as an adviser to the then Labor state government. He later moved to Queensland, working for Legal Aid and the Public Trustee in Cairns and operating his own private legal practice there.

In 1993, Dodd was elected to the Australian House of Representatives as the Labor member for the Queensland seat of Leichhardt. He was aligned with the party's Labor Left faction. Dodd was a member of the Joint Statutory Committee on the Australian Security Intelligence Organisation and the House of Representatives Standing Committee on Aboriginal and Torres Strait Islander Affairs. He had sought the latter committee placement due to his electorate including the Torres Strait.

He was sharply critical of the Liberal opposition's response to the Mabo High Court decision on native title, claiming their "consultative committee" was a "belated public relations exercise doomed to failure" with a predetermined outcome. He strongly supported the introduction of native title legislation and the creation of a Torres Strait Regional Authority. He was defeated at the 1996 federal election by Liberal Warren Entsch.

Parliament of Australia
| Preceded by John Gayler | Member for Leichhardt; 1993–1996 | Succeeded by Warren Entsch |
