= Warren Entsch =

Australian politician (born 1950)

The Honourable Warren Entsch
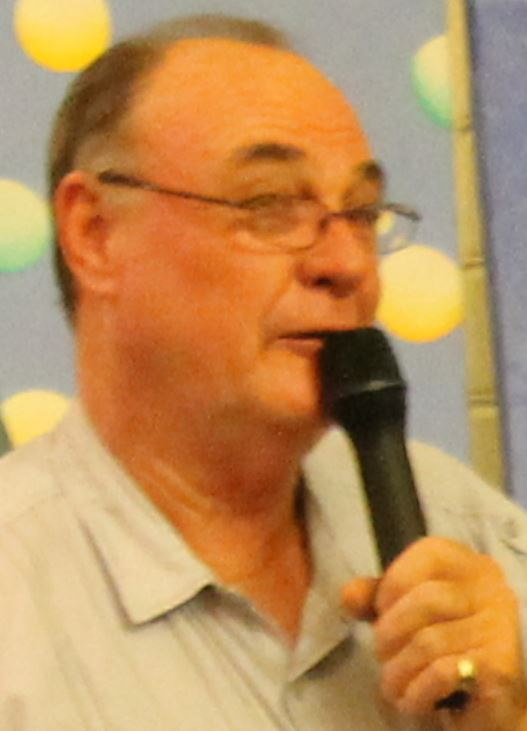
- Entsch in 2012

Special Envoy for the Great Barrier Reef
- In office 29 May 2019 – 11 April 2022
- Prime Minister: Scott Morrison
- Succeeded by: Nita Green

Chief Opposition Whip in the House of Representatives
- In office 14 September 2010 – 18 September 2013
- Leader: Tony Abbott
- Preceded by: Alex Somlyay
- Succeeded by: Philip Ruddock

Member of the Australian Parliament for Leichhardt
- In office 21 August 2010 – 28 March 2025
- Preceded by: Jim Turnour
- Succeeded by: Matt Smith
- In office 2 March 1996 – 17 October 2007
- Preceded by: Peter Dodd
- Succeeded by: Jim Turnour

Personal details
- Born: Warren George Entsch; 31 May 1950 (age 76) Babinda, Queensland, Australia
- Party: Liberal (LNP)
- Children: 3
- Occupation: Politician
- Website: warrenentsch.com.au

Warren George Entsch (born 31 May 1950) is an Australian politician who was a long-serving member of the House of Representatives for a total of 26 years, from 1996 to 2007 and from 2010 to 2025, representing the Division of Leichhardt. He is a member of the Liberal National Party of Queensland, and sat with the Liberal Party in federal parliament.

== Early life and education ==
Warren George Entsch was born on 31 May 1950 in Babinda, Queensland and served in the Royal Australian Air Force 1969–78. He was a railway porter, maintenance fitter and welder, real estate agent, farmer, grazier, crocodile catcher and company director before entering politics.

In his time outside of Parliament between 2007 and 2010, Entsch worked as an independent director on the board of CEC Group, a Cairns-based property development company, and a Director of the Australian Rainforest Foundation, a Cairns-based organisation focussing on the Daintree Rainforest.

== Politics ==
Entsch was first elected to the House of Representatives at the March 1996 federal election. He was Parliamentary Secretary to the Minister for Industry, Science and Resources 1998–2001 and was Parliamentary Secretary to the Minister for Industry, Tourism and Resources from 2001 to 2006. He then decided on retirement, ostensibly to spend time with his teenage son, and did not contest the November 2007 election. He remained a member of the Liberal Party of Queensland until the formation of the Liberal National Party of Queensland in 2008. At that time, he supported the leadership of Brendan Nelson, regarding the spill against him by Malcolm Turnbull as "treachery."

On 10 November 2009, Entsch announced that he would again run for pre-selection for the seat of Leichhardt and was re-elected to parliament at the August 2010 election, defeating the man who had succeeded him in 2007, Labor incumbent Jim Turnour. Entsch was subsequently appointed Chief Opposition Whip by then-opposition leader Tony Abbott.

At the 2016 federal election Entsch was re-elected with 39.4% of first-preference votes, marking his seventh election victory in 20 years. Entsch played a part in deposing of Malcolm Turnbull in the 2018 Liberal Party of Australia leadership spills.

He was again re-elected at the 2019 Australian federal election with 37.6% of first-preference votes. He was shortly afterwards appointed to the position of "special envoy to the Great Barrier Reef" by Prime Minister Scott Morrison. In May 2019, in his re-election victory speech, claimed his own success in the legalisation of same-sex marriage: "I've been very successful in campaigning for national change. Medical cannabis was one that I was able to successfully implement, the other was same-sex marriage, which I'm very proud of."

In his role as chair of the Parliament's Northern Australia Committee and the Juukan Gorge Inquiry, Entsch tabled the interim report of the "Inquiry into the destruction of 46,000-year-old caves at the Juukan Gorge in the Pilbara region of Western Australia" in December 2020.

Entsch was able to retain his seat at the 2022 election.

He argued for the "No" case in the 2023 referendum on the Voice to Parliament. In local matters, Entsch has proposed the sale of housing commission properties to tenants, the same mechanism by which his own parents had become home owners. Enstch has become a supporter of a spaceport on the Cape York Peninsula proposed by Space Centre Australia, where “I started as a sceptic and I’m now an absolute disciple."

== Political positions ==
Entsch is a member of the Moderate faction of the Liberal Party. He is known for supporting progressive causes.

=== Cannabis reform ===
Access to medical cannabis was a long campaign for Entsch. In February 2016 he was one of the politicians who succeeded in passing a reform bill approved for conditions ranging from chronic pain to anxiety and depression.

=== Indigenous Voice to Parliament ===
While Entsch did not campaign for or against the Indigenous Voice to Parliament, in the eventually unsuccessful referendum on the matter in 2023, Entsch voted No. His reasoning was that he believed it would not have provided adequate support for Indigenous people and their communities. He does, however, support the constitutional recognition of Indigenous Australians. He also criticised prominent Yes campaigner Noel Pearson, who he called a "crony" and rejected his large influence in local politics on the Cape York Peninsula. 65.55% of voters in Entsch's seat of Leichhardt voted No in the referendum.

=== Maritime environment ===
Entsch has strongly prosecuted the issue of plastic pollution on the reef, asserting that climate change was not a threat to the existence of the Great Barrier Reef. By the end of 2019 Entsch acknowledged climate change and its impact as a serious threat to the Great Barrier Reef. In his December 2019 report to environment minister Sussan Ley he stated "Global climate change looms as the most serious existential threat to the long-term health and viability of the Reef."

=== Same sex marriage ===
During the lead-up to Australia legalising same-sex marriage in 2017, Entsch was for a long time a strong advocate for marriage equality in the Coalition.

In December 2005, Entsch pledged support for a civil union scheme after Britain began granting civil partnerships. In September 2010 Entsch indicated that he did not consider same-sex marriage an important issue and voted against the Australian Greens' 2010 motion for members of the house to poll their constituents on the issue of same-sex marriage. Two years later, following opposition leader Tony Abbott's refusal to grant a conscience vote to Liberal MPs, he voted against a bill sponsored by Labor MP Stephen Jones that would have legalised same-sex marriage. On 17 August 2015, against Abbott's wishes, Entsch introduced a private member's bill to legalise same-sex marriage, arguing it would prevent Australia from being "a divided nation." On 7 December 2017, Entsch spoke in favour of and voted for, the Marriage Amendment (Definition and Religious Freedoms) Bill that enabled same-sex marriage in Australia.

== Personal life ==
Entsch is married to Yolonde Werner. In March 2023, she was named by Queensland opposition leader David Crisafulli to be the LNP's candidate for the electoral district of Cairns in the 2024 Queensland state election, but was not elected. In 2025, Entsch updated his register of member interests to indicate that he had separated from Yolonde.

Parliament of Australia
| Preceded by Peter Dodd | Member for Leichhardt; 1996–2007 | Succeeded by Jim Turnour |
| Preceded by Jim Turnour | Member for Leichhardt; 2010–2025 | Succeeded by Matt Smith |
