= Jim Turnour =

Australian politician (born 1966)

Member of the Australian Parliament for Leichhardt
- In office 24 November 2007 – 21 August 2010
- Preceded by: Warren Entsch
- Succeeded by: Warren Entsch

Personal details
- Born: 7 April 1966 (age 60) Darwin, Northern Territory, Australia
- Party: Labor
- Education: University of Queensland
- Occupation: Public servant
- Website: JimTurnour.com.au

James Pearce Turnour (born 7 April 1966) is an Australian former politician. He represented the Queensland seat of Leichhardt in the House of Representatives from 2007 to 2010, as a member of the Australian Labor Party (ALP). He was a public servant in Queensland's agriculture department prior to entering parliament.

== Early life ==
Turnour was born on 7 April 1966 in Darwin, Northern Territory. He is the third of four children born to Joan (née Pearce) and John Turnour; his mother was a Ten Pound Pom. He grew up on his parents' mixed farming property at Coomalie Creek.

Turnour boarded at Brisbane Grammar School. He holds the degrees of Bachelor of Agricultural Science and Bachelor of Economics from the University of Queensland. Prior to entering parliament he worked for Queensland's Department of Primary Industries for 20 years and also as an agricultural consultant. He managed Operation Farm Clear, a program assisting farmers in recovery from Cyclone Larry.

== Politics ==
Turnour won Leichhardt at the 2007 election on a swing of 14 percent, the largest in the country. It was actually his second bid for the seat; he challenged Liberal incumbent Warren Entsch in 2004 and was heavily defeated. Entsch retired in 2007. He held Leichhardt on a seemingly safe majority of 10 percent, but Turnour rode a large Labor wave to take the seat. He lost to Entsch in 2010.

He currently manages a large-scale project for the Queensland Department of Primary Industries, helping farmers recover after Cyclone Larry and has worked for Senator Jan McLucas in the past.

== Subsequent activities ==
Jim Turnour is on the committee of Northern Beaches Landcare and the Trinity Inlet Catchment Management Association. He is also a member of SPEED (Southern Parents Empowering Early Development), Cairns and District Chinese Association, Cairns Yacht Club, Cairns and Far North Environment Centre and is a guest presenter on Cairns Community Radio.

=== Federal Committee Service ===
House of Representatives Standing:

- Aboriginal and Torres Strait Islander Affairs from 19.2.08
- Economics from 19.2.08

Joint Standing:

- National Capital and External Territories from 18.2.08

Parliament of Australia
Preceded by Warren Entsch	Member for Leichhardt; 2007–2010	Succeeded by Warren Entsch
