= John Gayler =

Australian politician (1943–2022)

Member of the Australian Parliament for Leichhardt
- In office 5 March 1983 – 8 February 1993
- Preceded by: David Thomson
- Succeeded by: Peter Dodd

Personal details
- Born: 14 April 1943 Toowoomba, Queensland, Australia
- Died: 27 July 2022 (aged 79) Gordonvale, Queensland, Australia
- Party: Labor
- Occupation: Solicitor

John Gayler (14 April 1943 – 27 July 2022) was an Australian politician. He served in the House of Representatives from 1983 to 1993, representing the Queensland seat of Leichhardt for the Australian Labor Party (ALP).

== Early life ==
Gayler was born on 14 April 1943 in Toowoomba, Queensland. He was a solicitor prior to entering politics. According to The Canberra Times, he was also a former representative rugby league player and was known for "his legal work, his involvement in prisoner aid and black affairs, as well as for his continued administrative involvement in rugby league".

== Politics ==
Gayler was elected to parliament at the 1983 federal election, defeating the incumbent National Party member David Thomson, a minister in the Fraser government. He was re-elected at the 1987 and 1990 elections before retiring from politics at the 1993 election.

Gayler served on the Joint Standing Committee on Foreign Affairs and Defence, the House Standing Committee on Aboriginal Affairs and the House Select Committee into Aboriginal Education. He served on the council of the Australian Institute of Aboriginal Studies from 1985 to 1990. Gayler took a keen interest in the protection of the Daintree Rainforest within his electorate, supporting the listing of the Wet Tropics of Queensland as a World Heritage Site and drawing attention to illegal logging. He supported Prime Minister Bob Hawke in the two leadership spills held in 1991, and in January 1992 publicly criticised Hawke's successor Paul Keating for his leadership style. He confirmed his intention to retire in mid-1992.

Parliament of Australia
Preceded by David Thomson	Member for Leichhardt; 1983–1993	Succeeded by Peter Dodd
