= Air Queensland =

Australian airline (1951–1988)

IATA	ICAO	Call sign
QN	AQN	BUSHAIR
- Founded: 1951
- Ceased operations: 30 April 1988
- Hubs: Cairns International Airport
- Headquarters: Cairns, Australia

Air Queensland, formerly Bush Pilots Airways, was an Australian airline which operated from 1951 until 1988.

== History ==
Bush Pilots Airways was formed in 1951 and operated in Queensland, Australia until 1988. Its first aircraft was a de Havilland DH-90 "Dragonfly" registered as VH-AAD. This was purchased from Adastra Airways Ltd in Sydney in 1951 and flown to Cairns, Queensland by Bush Pilots founder Bob Norman.

In 1963 Bush Pilots Airways acquired Somerset Airways which was established in 1950 and operated out of Longreach Airport with Auster J-1N Alpha and Beech Bonanza

In May 1972 Bush Pilots absorbed Queensland Pacific Airways Ltd, taking over its Douglas DC-3 aircraft.

In 1978 Bush Pilots Airways changed their name to BPA. BPA operated Douglas DC-3 aircraft, Britten-Norman Trislanders and Swearingen Metroliners. Operations were largely in Queensland, Australia, although the airline also provided service to Groote Eylandt in the Northern Territory. The services north from Brisbane (and return) were very popular with business travellers and tourists alike. A typical run involved stops in regional cities between Brisbane and Townsville, such as Maroochydore, Maryborough, Bundaberg, Gladstone, Rockhampton, and Mackay. Short-distance services operated from Cairns to inland and coastal locations such as Cooktown, Karumba and Normanton. With such frequent stops a high altitude was never achieved, offering good views of this scenic part of the state.

On 1 December 1981 BPA became Air Queensland. Air Queensland was the last airline in Australia to use Douglas DC-3s on regular scheduled services, the last being withdrawn on 7 April 1988. The Air Queensland name ceased to exist on 30 April 1988 when the airline was absorbed into Australian Airlines (later absorbed into Qantas). The last General Manager was Ron Entsch.

A Douglas DC-3 formerly operated by Bush Pilots Airways was on display at Cairns International Airport from 1984 until 2008, when it was removed due to concerns over its structural integrity.

By 1988 Air Queensland served 44 destinations throughout Queensland and the Northern Territory.

== Queensland Pacific Airways ==
Queensland Pacific Airways
IATA	ICAO	Call sign
-	-	-
- Commenced operations: 1971
- Ceased operations: 1972
- Parent company: Queensland Pacific Trading Company
- Headquarters: Australia

Queensland Pacific Airways was a trading name of Queensland Pacific Trading Company. It acquired DC-3 aircraft when Qantas disposed of its last Douglas DC-3s in 1971. In 1972, it was absorbed by Bush Pilots Airways (BPA), which eventually became Air Queensland.

== Fleet ==
- ATR 42
- Britten-Norman Trislander
- Cessna 404 Titan
- de Havilland Canada DHC-6 Twin Otter
- Douglas DC-3
- Fairchild Metro
- Fokker F.27 Friendship with 9 aircraft operated through its history.
- GAF Nomad

== See also ==
- List of defunct airlines of Australia
- Aviation in Australia
