= Division of Leichhardt =

Australian federal electoral division

Coordinates: 14.357°S 143.121°E

Leichhardt Australian House of Representatives Division
- Interactive map of boundaries since the 2019 federal election
- Created: 1949
- MP: Matt Smith
- Party: Labor
- Namesake: Ludwig Leichhardt
- Electors: 122,787 (2025)
- Demographic: Rural and provincial
Electorates around Leichhardt:
Gulf of Carpentaria	Torres Strait	Coral Sea
Gulf of Carpentaria	Leichhardt	Coral Sea
Kennedy	Kennedy	Kennedy

The Division of Leichhardt (/laɪkɑːrt/) is an Australian electoral division in the state of Queensland. Its MP has been Matt Smith of the Labor Party since 2025.

Leichhardt is located in Far North Queensland. It is a very mixed electorate, with its classification ranging from provincial in the south and rural and remote elsewhere. It includes the city of Cairns, as well as many towns such as Cooktown, Port Douglas and Weipa, and several Indigenous communities on the Cape York Peninsula and in the Torres Strait Islands.

== Geography ==
Since 1984, federal electoral division boundaries in Australia have been determined at redistributions by a redistribution committee appointed by the Australian Electoral Commission. Redistributions occur for the boundaries of divisions in a particular state, and they occur every seven years, or sooner if a state's representation entitlement changes or when divisions of a state are malapportioned.

It is located in Far North Queensland and includes the Torres Strait Islands. It includes the local government areas of Cairns, Cook, Douglas, Torres and Wujal Wujal.

== Demographics ==
As of the 2021 Australian census, Leichhardt had a total of 175,620 residents (including those who are not on the electoral roll). 50.4% of the population is female, and 49.6% is male. This reflects a trend across northern Australia where the male population tends to be above average. The median age is 39, compared to the state and national average of 38.

Aboriginal and Torres Strait Islander people make up 16.3% of the total population, significantly above the state average of 4.6% and national average of 3.2%.

44.8% of people in Leichhardt are unmarried, significantly higher than the national and state averages. 38.3% of residents have a registered marriage, while 16.9% are in a de facto marriage.

Leichhardt is somewhat multicultural. 31.8% of the population has English ancestry, 26.9% have Australian ancestry, 10.9% have Aboriginal ancestry, 9.7% have Irish ancestry and 8.7% have Scottish ancestry.

== History ==
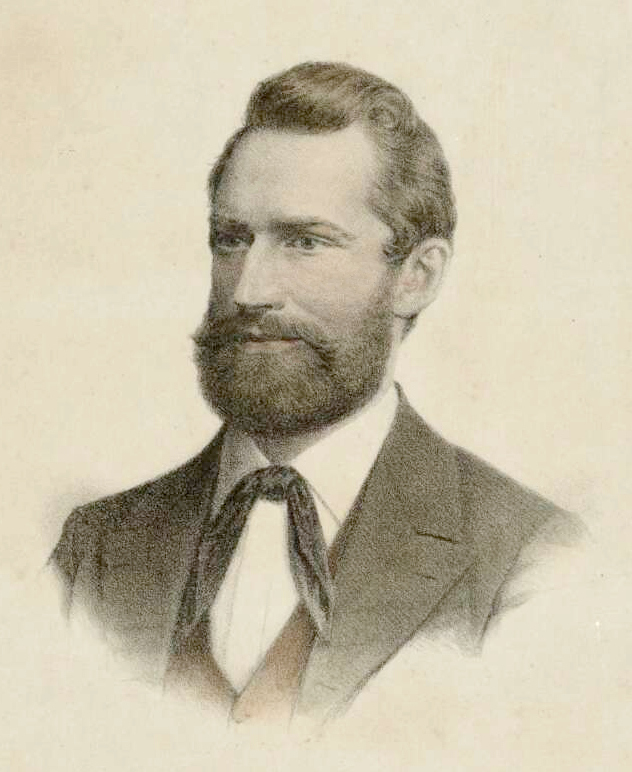
Ludwig Leichhardt, the division's namesake

The division was first contested in 1949 after the expansion of seats in the Parliament of Australia. It is one of Australia's largest electorates, covering an area stretching from Cairns to Cape York and the Torres Strait, including the Torres Strait Islands. It is the northernmost-reaching federal division in Australia (although it averages slightly south of the Division of Solomon in the Northern Territory).

The division is named after Ludwig Leichhardt, an explorer and scientist. The area was first covered by the seat of Herbert from 1901 to 1934 and then by the seat of Kennedy until 1949.

Most of the electorate is almost uninhabited except for small Aboriginal communities, but the extreme southeast, consisting of the northern half of the Wet Tropics, with rich volcanic soils instead of the extraordinarily infertile lateritic sands and gravels of Cape York proper, is quite densely populated and includes urban Cairns. There are small, intensive sugar cane, banana and mango farms in this region, though they are prone to damage from droughts and cyclones.

A safe Labor seat from the late 1950s to the 1970s, it has been marginal for most of the time since then. While Cairns has historically tilted toward Labor, the more rural areas tilt toward the Liberals and Nationals.

It was a bellwether seat held by the party of government from the 1972 election until the 2010 election. When Warren Entsch, who held the seat from 1996 to 2007, won it back for the LNP in 2010, he became the seat's first opposition member in four decades. It also marked the first time Labor had been in government without holding Leichhardt.

Ahead of the 2016 federal election, ABC psephologist Antony Green listed the seat in his election guide as one of eleven which he classed as bellwether electorates.

Warren Entsch retired from federal politics upon the dissolution of the 47th Parliament on 28 March 2025 in the lead-up to the 2025 federal election. Former professional basketball player Matt Smith subsequently won the seat for Labor, defeating LNP candidate Jeremy Neal.

== Members ==
Image	Member	Party	Term	Notes
	Tom Gilmore (1908–1994)	Country	10 December 1949 – 28 April 1951	Lost seat. Later elected to the Legislative Assembly of Queensland seat of Tablelands in 1957
	Harry Bruce (1884–1958)	Labor	28 April 1951 – 11 October 1958	Previously held the Legislative Assembly of Queensland seat of The Tableland. Died in office
	Bill Fulton (1909–1988)	Labor	22 November 1958 – 11 November 1975	Retired
	David Thomson (1924–2013)	National Country	13 December 1975 – 16 October 1982	Served as minister under Fraser. Lost seat
	David Thomson (1924–2013)	Nationals	16 October 1982 – 5 March 1983	Served as minister under Fraser. Lost seat
	John Gayler (1943–2022)	Labor	5 March 1983 – 8 February 1993	Retired
	Peter Dodd (1953–)	Labor	13 March 1993 – 2 March 1996	Lost seat
	Warren Entsch (1950–)	Liberal	2 March 1996 – 24 November 2007	Retired
	Jim Turnour (1966–)	Labor	24 November 2007 – 21 August 2010	Lost seat
	Warren Entsch (1950–)	Liberal (Note: Member of the Liberal National Party of Queensland sitting with the federal parliamentary Liberal Party.)	21 August 2010 – 28 March 2025	Retired
	Matt Smith (1979–)	Labor	3 May 2025 – present	Incumbent

== Election results ==
2025 Australian federal election: Leichhardt
Party	Candidate	Votes	%	±%
Labor	Matt Smith	34,488	36.50	+8.90
Liberal National	Jeremy Neal	25,746	27.25	−9.45
Greens	Phillip Musumeci	8,776	9.29	−0.68
One Nation	Robert Hicks	7,568	8.01	+0.57
Katter's Australian	Daniel Collins	5,997	6.35	+0.72
Legalise Cannabis	Nicholas Daniels	5,359	5.67	+5.67
Trumpet of Patriots	Greg Dowling	2,149	2.27	+1.76
Family First	Les Searle	1,796	1.90	+1.90
Independent	Norman Miller	1,659	1.76	+1.76
Libertarian	Lloyd Russell	942	1.00	+1.00
Total formal votes		94,480	92.76	−0.42
Informal votes		7,372	7.24	+0.42
Turnout		101,852	82.97	−1.00
Two-party-preferred result
Labor	Matt Smith	52,967	56.06	+9.50
Liberal National	Jeremy Neal	41,513	43.94	−9.50
Labor gain from Liberal National		Swing	+9.50	
