= Gin Gin railway station =

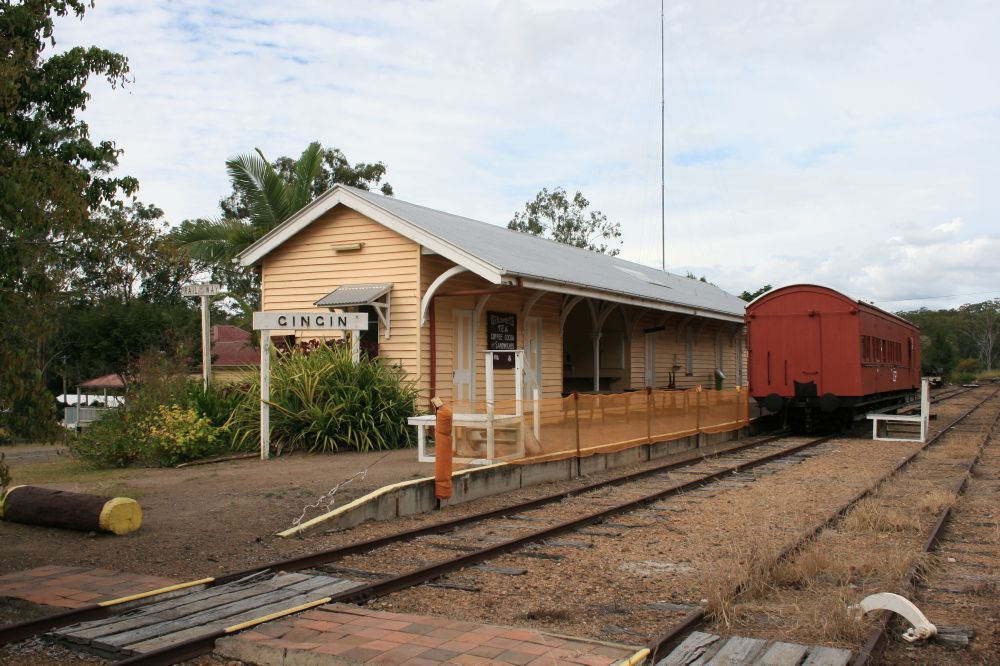
- Gin Gin railway station, 2009

- Location within Queensland Location within Australia
- 24.9943°S 151.9601°E
- Location: Mulgrave Street, Gin Gin, Bundaberg Region, Queensland, Australia

History
- Design period: 1870s–1890s (late 19th century)
- Built: 1888–c. 1928

Queensland Heritage Register
- Official name: Gin Gin Railway Station and Complex, Gin Gin Railway Station, Goods Shed & Refreshment Rooms
- Type: state heritage (built)
- Designated: 28 July 2000
- Reference no.: 601651
- Significant period: 1880s, 1980s (historical); 1888–ongoing (social)
- Significant components: platform, residential accommodation – station master's house/quarters, views to, shed – goods, railway station, nameboard/s, ticket box/office, furniture/fittings, crane / gantry

Gin Gin railway station is a heritage-listed railway station at Mulgrave Street, Gin Gin, Bundaberg Region, Queensland, Australia. It was built from 1888 to c. 1928. It is also known as Gin Gin Railway Station, Goods Shed & Refreshment Rooms. It was added to the Queensland Heritage Register on 28 July 2000.

== History ==
The township of Gin Gin was gazetted in 1877, consisting of an area of some three thousand acres on the Gin Gin run. Gin Gin was an original station of the first section of the Mount Perry railway line which opened from North Bundaberg to Moolboolaman on 19 July 1881.

The exploitation of the mineral resources of Queensland was recognised by political interests in Queensland as being closely linked with the development of a railway system from the period of the late 1860s and early 1870s. This connection between political decisions and economic development was further linked and with the decision taken in 1877 to construct mineral railways running from Townsville to Charters Towers, Bundaberg to Mount Perry and Maryborough to Gympie. As well extension of the Southern railway line from Warwick to Stanthorpe was approved along with extensions to Roma and Emerald on the same day in Queensland Parliament, 30 August 1877. The decision to construct separate railway systems with no connection to other parts of the Queensland Railway system was to result in a proliferation of separate railways throughout Queensland, (up to eleven by 1891). The system would not be unified until 1924 with the opening of the North Coast railway line between Brisbane and Cairns.

The Mount Perry railway (originally known as the Bundaberg Railway) was built by the Queensland Government. The line was built to service the Mount Perry copper mines. Copper was discovered in the Mount Perry area in the second half of the nineteenth century. Mining activities led to agitation for a link between the mines of the Mount Perry region and a port. In 1872 proposals of a private railway line were considered, and both Maryborough and Bundaberg vied to secure the line. These plans were never executed however. Rather, it was decided a state-owned line would be constructed. Thornloe Smith, engineer in charge of Railway Surveys, conducted a survey from North Bundaberg to Mount Perry in 1875. Thornloe's survey noted the country was rugged, and eventual surveying plans called for a tunnel to pierce part of the Boolboonda Range. The first section, North Bundaberg to Moolboolaman, was constructed by Overend and Co. and opened on 19 July 1881, although timber specials had run for some months previously. The second section, including the Boolboonda tunnel works, was approved in November 1880. By the end of 1880 more than 350 men were employed on the construction of the railway line.

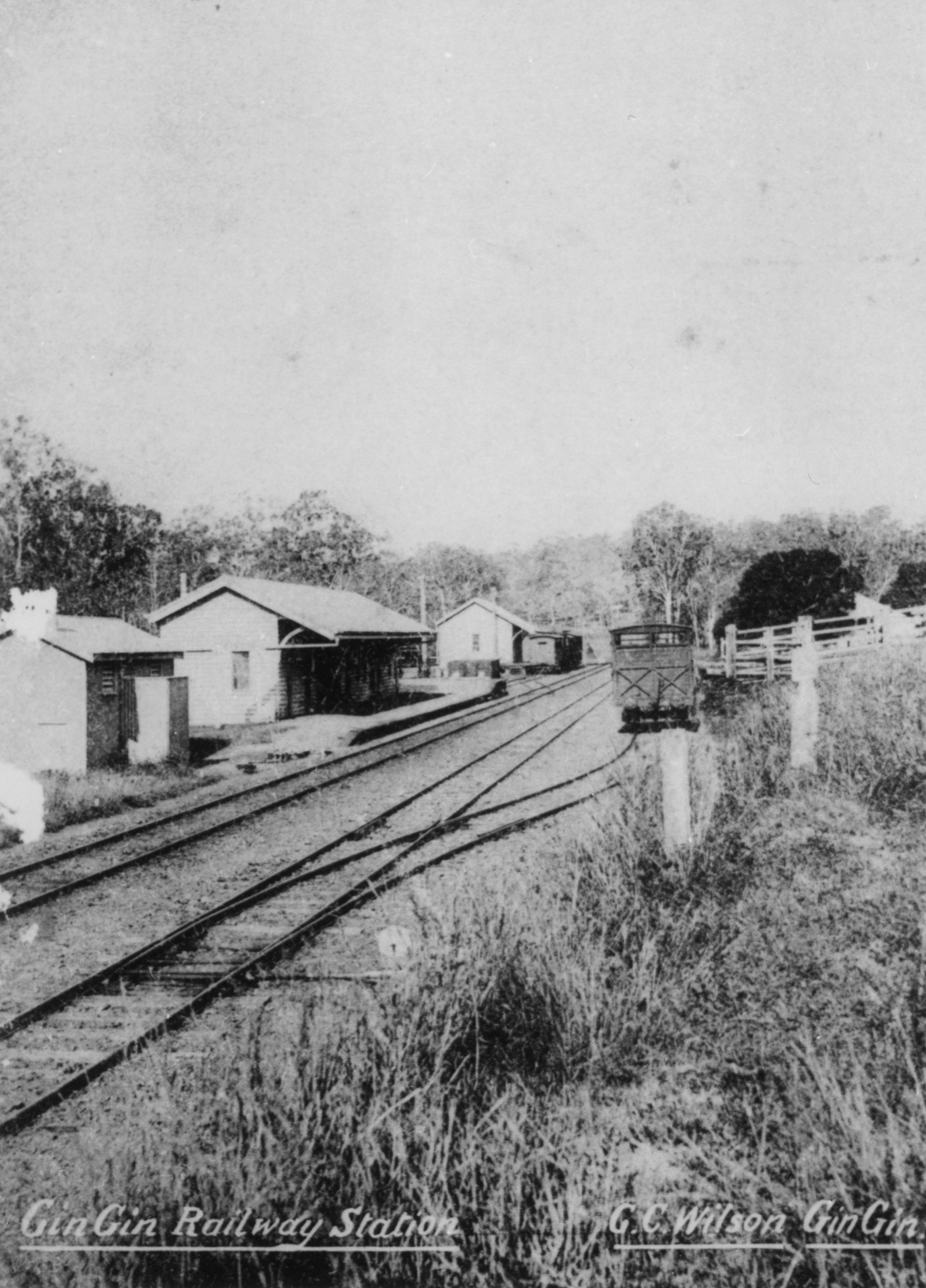
Railway station at Gin Gin, circa 1905

Tenders had been called for the construction of a goods shed in 1880. A loading bank was provided in 1882, and in 1883 timber loading facilities were constructed indicating the importance of timber and sawmilling operations for the railway line. A new goods shed, and combined shelter shed and station office were built in 1888/89. A refreshment room was provided from the period of 1891 until 1960. The shed was destroyed by fire on 7 November 1917. In 1928 the complex consisted of a station building, lamp room, trucking (cattle handling) yards, goods shed with 1-long-ton (1.0 t) crane, trike sheds and the station master's residence. Gin Gin was to become the major regional transport centre within the central part of the Burnett area, and a major transport centre within the region. Given that Gin Gin was also situated on the main highway link between Brisbane and Cairns (the Bruce Highway), the growth of road competition was to contribute to the eventual dwindling of revenue freight carried on the line.

At the completion of the line to Mount Perry in 1884, the copper mines which had led to the construction of the railway line had closed due to the financial failure of the mines. The copper mines reopened around the turn of the nineteenth-twentieth centuries and with the construction of a smelter, operated until the period of the First World War. For the next 50 years the main traffic generated on the Mount Perry line was mainly from dairying, livestock and timber traffic, with sugar traffic from Gin Gin east to the Gibson and Howes mill.

From 1 November 1960 the Mount Perry railway was closed beyond Tirroan, due to declining revenue. The railway beyond Tirroan was dismantled in 1961. After the transfer of sugar cane traffic from the Watawa plantation area in 1964, to the Gin Gin Central Sugar Mill at Wallaville there was little traffic beyond Gin Gin other than stock specials to the cattle loading railhead at Tirroan. The section of line from Tirroan to Mount Perry was closed in 1960 and removed in 1961, due to declining traffic revenues. The Gin Gin to Tirroan section was closed in 1989. The final section of the Bundaberg Railway, beyond the Versatile Toft siding (North Bundaberg to Gin Gin), closed officially to traffic on 25 January 1993, although services had been suspended in 1991. The line was sold for removal, with rail being sold off to local sugar mills for use on their tram networks. Part of the former right-of-way has been adapted for use by the Bingera Mill for its sugar tramway. The Gin Gin station complex was leased to the Gin Gin and District Historical Society in 1993, following closure of the railway. The complex was purchased by the Kolan Shire Council in 1995 for the use of the Historical Society. Other buildings have been transported on to the site by the Gin Gin and District Historical Society including a school house, and police residence, barn and indigenous museum (housed within the former goods shed). The additional buildings have not been relocated to the immediate vicinity of the former railway yard, and as a result do not detract from the visual appeal of the railway complex Within the former station yard the trackwork, turnouts and roads have been retained extant. Donated items from Queensland Railways including a BBV guards van, camp wagon, and a flat wagon and water gin, which have been placed on the platform road at the station building, and other roads within the complex. At the Tirroan end of the complex a former Gin Gin Central Sugar Mill tramway 0-6-0 steam locomotive has been placed on display on a dual-gauge 1,067-and-670-millimetre (42.0 and 26.4 in) track.

Built as a low-cost development railway, the Mount Perry railway features two major surviving structures entered permanently in the Queensland Heritage Register: the Boolboonda Tunnel (now open to road traffic) and Splitters Creek Railway Bridge at Sharon.

== Description ==
The Gin Gin complex consists of the station building which is a representative late Victorian building with curved and chamfered brackets to the shade and distinguishing porch with fretted gable. It is of comparable appearance to Esk, Bundamba and North Bundaberg railway stations. Accommodation is provided with ladies water closet, waiting room, lamp store, shelter shed and office. Booking windows face the shelter area and the platform and central shelter area post has curved decorative brackets facing three directions. Station nameboards are extant on the platform .

The goods shed is a 10-by-6-metre (33 ft × 20 ft) timber-framed weatherboard clad building without shade and with windows sealed through boarding. It has one sliding door mounted on opposite sides of the shed, and the loading platform has been partly demolished. Goods crane is a one-ton whip crane bearing a manufacturing plate of Sargeant engineers, Brisbane.

The former Station Masters house is a simply detailed building elevated with a corrugated iron hipped roof and verandah post brackets. The building at present is occupied by the Gin Gin and District Historical Society.

== Heritage listing ==
Gin Gin Railway Station and Complex was listed on the Queensland Heritage Register on 28 July 2000 having satisfied the following criteria.

The place is important in demonstrating the evolution or pattern of Queensland's history.

The Mount Perry railway was one of several major railway lines approved by the Queensland Parliament in 1877, to access the gold and copper fields of Queensland from the ports of Maryborough, Townsville and Bundaberg. The complex, by its retention by the local Shire Council, allows for an interpretation of the construction, and development of the former North Bundaberg-Mount Perry railway line, as well as the network of branch lines centred on Bundaberg.

The place demonstrates rare, uncommon or endangered aspects of Queensland's cultural heritage.

The Gin Gin Railway Station and Complex is important as a substantially intact example of a country branchline station and its associated buildings and infrastructure.

The place is important in demonstrating the principal characteristics of a particular class of cultural places.

The Gin Gin Railway Station and Complex is important as a substantially intact example of a country branchline station and its associated buildings and infrastructure.

Its survival as a relatively intact group of railway buildings dating from various periods allows for the interpretation of the importance of the Queensland Railway network in the economic development of rural Queensland.

The place has a strong or special association with a particular community or cultural group for social, cultural or spiritual reasons.

Its use as a museum also is important in the interpretation of the complex and its significance to the local community.
