= Splitters Creek Railway Bridge =

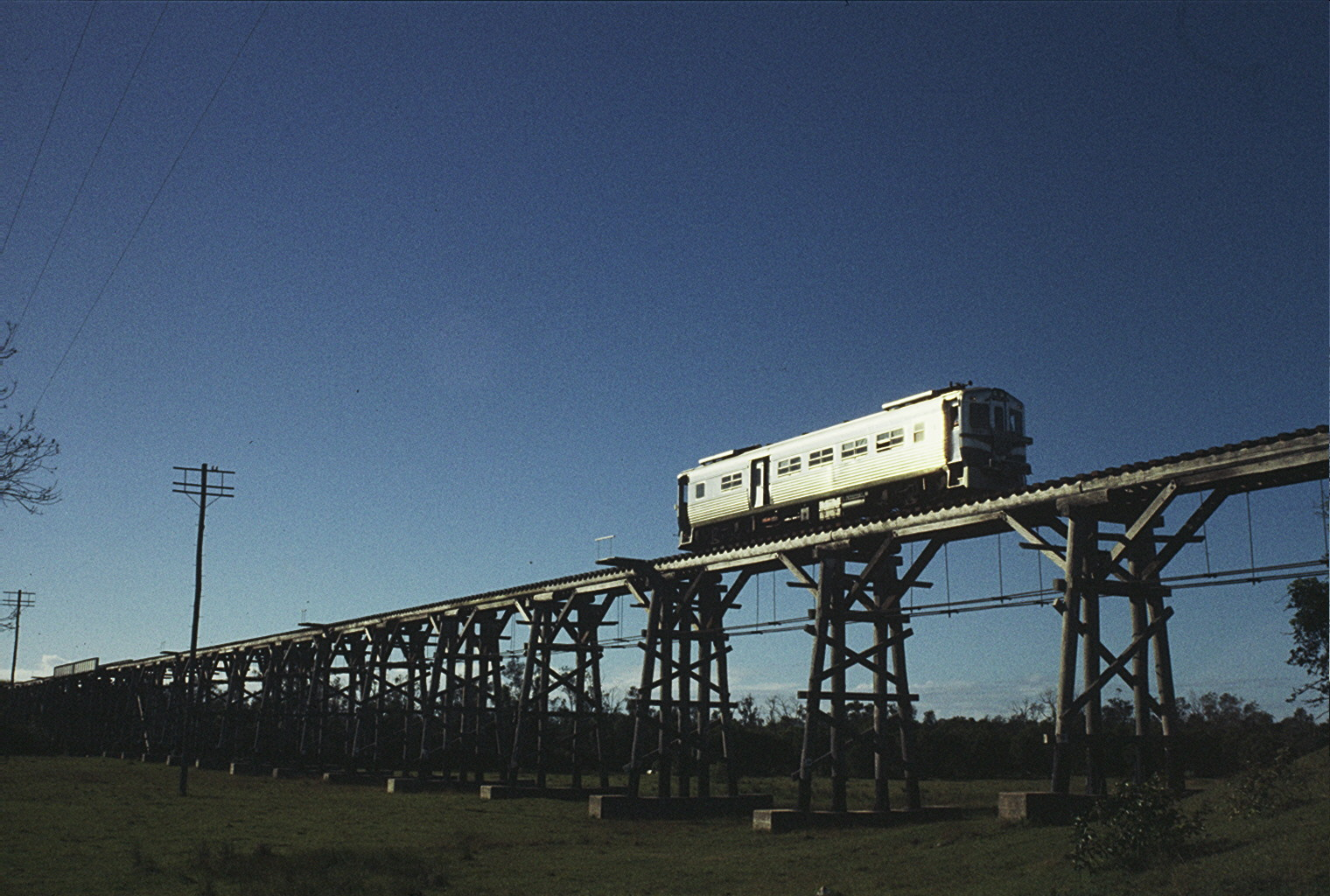
- RM 1901 crossing the Splitters Creek railway bridge, circa 1989

- Location within Queensland Location within Australia
- 24.8628°S 152.2859°E
- Location: across Splitters Creek on the Bundaberg–Mount Perry Line, between Oakwood and Sharon, Bundaberg Region, Queensland, Australia

History
- Design period: 1870s–1890s (late 19th century)
- Built: 1879–1880

Queensland Heritage Register
- Official name: Splitters Creek Railway Bridge, Splitters Creek Railway Bridge (Sharon)
- Type: state heritage (built)
- Designated: 21 October 1992
- Reference no.: 600529
- Significant period: 1870s (fabric); 1881–1993 (historical use)
- Significant components: abutments – railway bridge, pier/s (bridge)
- Builders: J & A Overend

Splitters Creek Railway Bridge is a heritage-listed railway bridge across Splitters Creek on the Bundaberg–Mount Perry Line, between Oakwood and Sharon in the Bundaberg Region, Queensland, Australia. It was built from 1879 to 1880 by J & A Overend. It was added to the Queensland Heritage Register on 21 October 1992.

== History ==
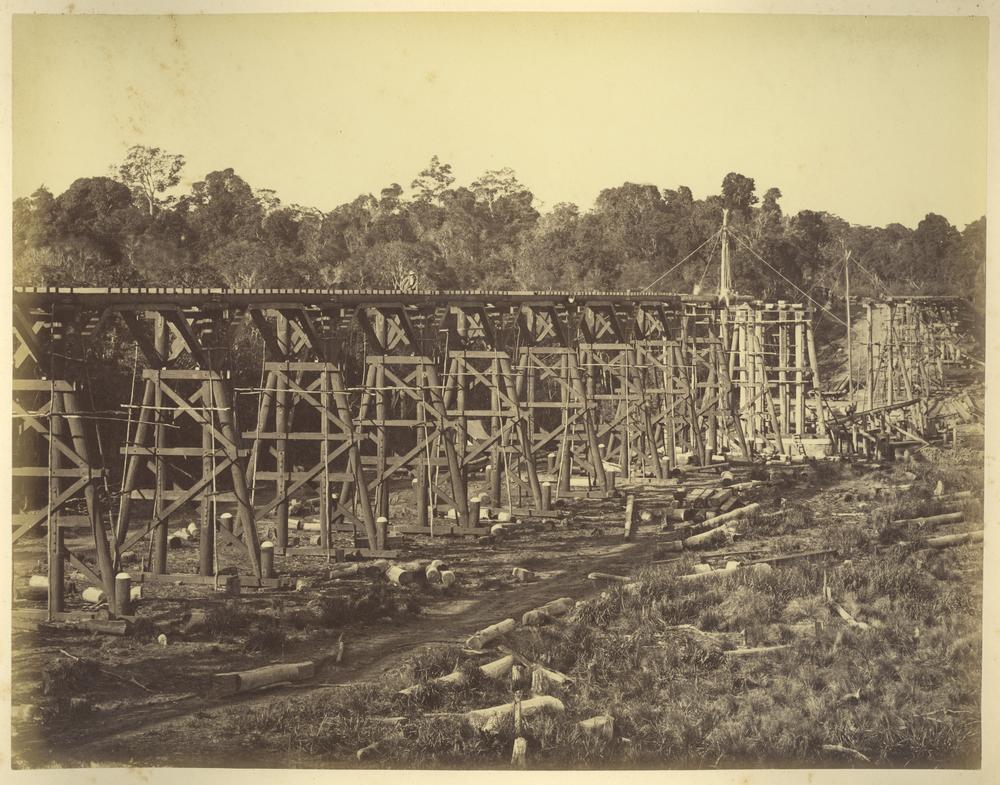
Splitters Creek railway bridge under construction

The contract for the first section of the Mount Perry railway was awarded to J. & A. Overend and Company in November 1878. Progress on the railway was delayed during 1879 by construction of the bridge over Splitters Creek. The original design required screw pile foundations, but a deep bed of boulders was encountered and cast iron caissons, later filled with concrete and brickwork, had to be sunk instead. Work was further delayed by an unsuccessful attempt by the contractors to use coffer dams to aid the sinking of the piers.

The bridge was completed in 1880 with the use of compressed air equipment obtained from the engineer for the Fitzroy River bridge. The contract was completed in February 1881 at an additional cost of £1,461 due to the difficulties experienced in building the bridge. The railway was opened for traffic between North Bundaberg and Moolboolaman on 19 July 1881.

The bridge's aging plate girders and long timber spans caused restrictions on the use of heavy engines on the line and as early as 1916, no two attached PB15 or B15 class locomotives were permitted on the bridge at the same time. By 1958 two attached locomotives were allowed on the bridge at the same time if sanctioned by the District Superintendent and only at a speed not exceeding 4 miles per hour (6.4 km/h). By 1971 two attached diesel-hydraulic locomotives were allowed on the bridge at the same time provided the train was stopped before crossing and the speed did not exceed 4 miles per hour (6.4 km/h).

The last operating section of the railway, from North Bundaberg to Gin Gin including the bridge, was closed to traffic on 25 January 1993.

== Description ==
The bridge comprises two 60-foot (18 m) plate girder spans with timber longitudinals and timber approach spans including 36-foot (11 m) spans strengthened with strut and crown, other spans by truss and tie rods. Metal girders are continuous over two spans and support cross-girders at lower flange level. These carry longitudinal timber stringers on which the rails rest.

== Heritage listing ==
Splitters Creek Railway Bridge was listed on the Queensland Heritage Register on 21 October 1992 having satisfied the following criteria.

The place demonstrates rare, uncommon or endangered aspects of Queensland's cultural heritage.

A late 19th century timber trestle bridge, representative of a type once more widespread in Queensland, with riveted half-through continuous plate girder main spans which are the oldest extant of their type in Queensland.
