= Boolboonda Tunnel =

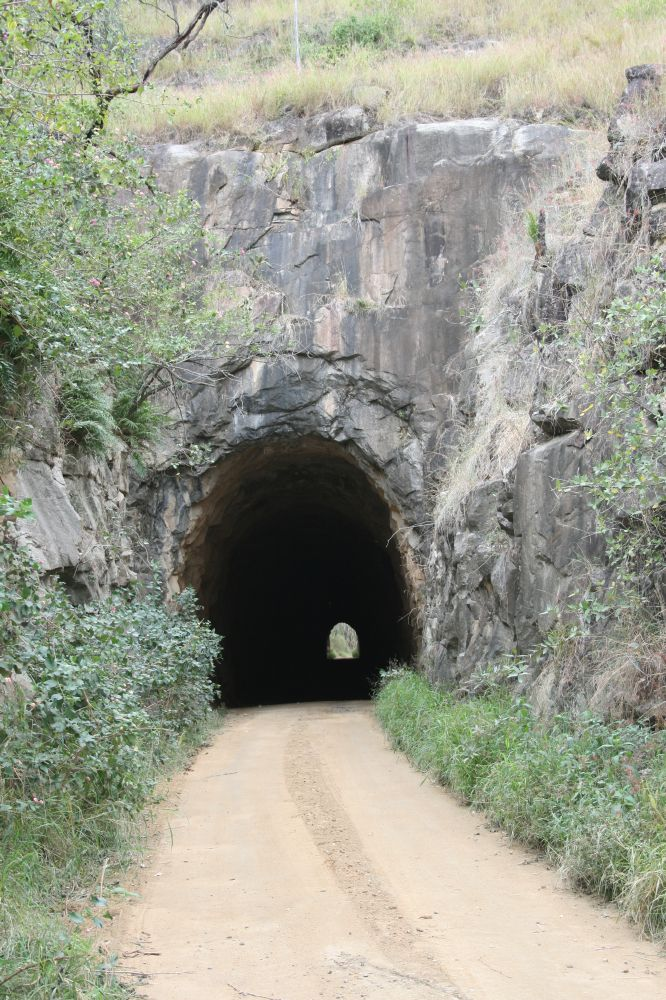
- Boolboonda Railway Tunnel western portal, 2009

- Location within Queensland
- 25.0815°S 151.6757°E
- Location: Tunnel Road, Boolboonda, Bundaberg Region, Queensland, Australia

History
- Design period: 1870s–1890s (late 19th century)
- Built: 1881–1884

Queensland Heritage Register
- Official name: Boolboonda Railway Tunnel, SEQ-6Q 1
- Type: state heritage (built)
- Designated: 24 September 1999
- Reference no.: 601516
- Significant period: 1880s (fabric); 1884–1960 (historical railway use of tunnel)
- Significant components: cutting – railway, tunnel – railway
- Builders: O'Rourke & McSharry

Boolboonda Tunnel is an abandoned heritage-listed railway tunnel at Tunnel Road, Boolboonda, Bundaberg Region, Queensland, Australia. The tunnel is 192 metres (630 ft) in length making it the longest unsupported man-made tunnel in Queensland. Its construction represented an important engineering feat for rail transport in Queensland. It was built from 1881 to 1884 by O'Rourke & McSharry. It is also known as Boolboonda Railway Tunnel and SEQ-6Q 1. It was added to the Queensland Heritage Register on 24 September 1999.

The Boolboonda Railway Tunnel opened 12 November 1883 following a construction period of two years. It was built by Queensland Government Railways as part of the Bundaberg to Mount Perry railway line, constructed to service the Mount Perry copper mines. It took two years to dig and was officially opened on 2 November 1883. The line was deviated in 1960 and tracks removed the following year. The section of the line between Tirroan and Mount Perry closed in 1960 and was removed in 1961.

== History ==
Copper was discovered in the Mount Perry area in the second half of the nineteenth century. Mining activities led to agitation for a link between the mines of the Mount Perry region and a port. In 1872 proposals of a private railway line were considered, and both Maryborough and Bundaberg vied to secure the line. These plans were never executed however. Rather, it was decided a state-owned line would be constructed. Thornloe Smith, Engineer in charge of Railway Surveys, conducted a survey from North Bundaberg to Mount Perry in 1875. Thornloe's survey noted the country was rugged, and eventual surveying plans called for a tunnel to pierce part of the Boolboonda Range. The Bundaberg Railway, as it was called, was constructed in two sections. The first section, North Bundaberg to Moolboolaman, was constructed by Overend and Company and opened on 19 July 1881, although timber specials had run for some months previously. The second section, including the tunnel works, was approved in November 1880.

The original tenderers for this second contract declined the offer and a second round was called. O'Rourke and McSharry submitted costings of £112,502. Previous to this another series of surveys had been conducted to avoid the expense of constructing a tunnel through the Boolboonda Range, however it was decided to continue with the original plans.

Work on the approaches to the tunnel had commenced by the end of 1881, progressing steadily throughout 1882. The Boolboonda Railway Tunnel was driven through the hard granite of the range, and as noted by the Acting Chief Engineer "this tunnel will not require to be lined being excavated through hard granite and that thus a saving of £5,000 will be effected". This was the first time in the colony where it had not been necessary to line a tunnel, due to the nature of the rock it was driven through. The hard granite rock also meant the tunnel did not require additional support, and it is the longest unsupported (railway) tunnel constructed in Queensland. Mechanical means, including boilers and air compressors for drills were used to advance the drilling of the two tunnel headings.

The section of line to Boolboonda opened on 12 November 1883. As noted in the Commissioner's Report for 1882–83, the tunnel being driven from east and west ends was about half complete at this time, a total drive of about 300 feet (91 m). The headings of the tunnel broke through at noon on 19 June 1883. The line to Mount Perry was officially opened to rail traffic on 19 May 1884. It included the tunnel and a succession of curves of 100 and 120 metres (330 and 390 ft) radius. Although the contract for the second section had expired on 10 February, the delay in completion was attributed to station works at Mount Perry and the difficulty the contractors met with in piercing the tunnel at Boolboonda, this not being completed until 1884. The tunnel when completed measured 584 feet (178 m) in length.

At the completion of the line the Mount Perry copper mines closed due to the financial failure of the mines. The copper mines reopened around the turn of the century and with the construction of a smelter, operated until the period of the First World War. The unlined tunnel and the Splitters Creek trestle bridge at Sharon were the two major engineering works undertaken on the Mount Perry line. For the next 50 years the main traffic generated on the Mount Perry line was mainly from dairying, livestock and timber traffic, with sugar traffic from Gin Gin east to the Gibson and Howes mill.

The section of line from Tirroan to Mount Perry was closed in 1960 and removed in 1961, due to declining traffic revenues. The final section of the Bundaberg Railway, Bundaberg to Gin Gin, closed in 1992. Since cessation of rail traffic the tunnel has become a habitat for a colony of bats. Built as a low cost, development railway, the only evidence remaining of the Tirroan-Mount Perry line are embankments and the Boolboonda tunnel (now open to road traffic).

Today the tunnel is accessible by vehicular traffic. It is maintained by the Bundaberg Regional Council and is now home to a colony of little bent-wing bats.

== Description ==
The Boolboonda Railway Tunnel, 192 metres (630 ft) in length, is located on Tunnel Road, approximately 11 kilometres (6.8 mi) in a north-easterly direction from the town of Mount Perry. Constructed through granite rock, the tunnel is unlined and unsupported. The tunnel is presently used by vehicular traffic.

== Heritage listing ==
Boolboonda Railway Tunnel was listed on the Queensland Heritage Register on 24 September 1999 having satisfied the following criteria.

The place is important in demonstrating the evolution or pattern of Queensland's history.

The Boolboonda Railway Tunnel is important in demonstrating the pattern of Queensland's history as evidence of the rail line from Bundaberg to Mount Perry built in the 1880s.

The place demonstrates rare, uncommon or endangered aspects of Queensland's cultural heritage.

The place demonstrates a rare aspect of Queensland's cultural heritage as an early example of one of the few railway tunnels built in Queensland not requiring lining or support. The tunnel is also made unusual by the absence of portals to the entries of the tunnel.

The place is important because of its aesthetic significance.

The Boolboonda Railway Tunnel is of aesthetic significance as a picturesque element in the landscape.

The place has a strong or special association with a particular community or cultural group for social, cultural or spiritual reasons.

The tunnel is of social significance to the local community.

== See also ==
- List of tunnels in Australia
