= Mackay Masonic Temple =

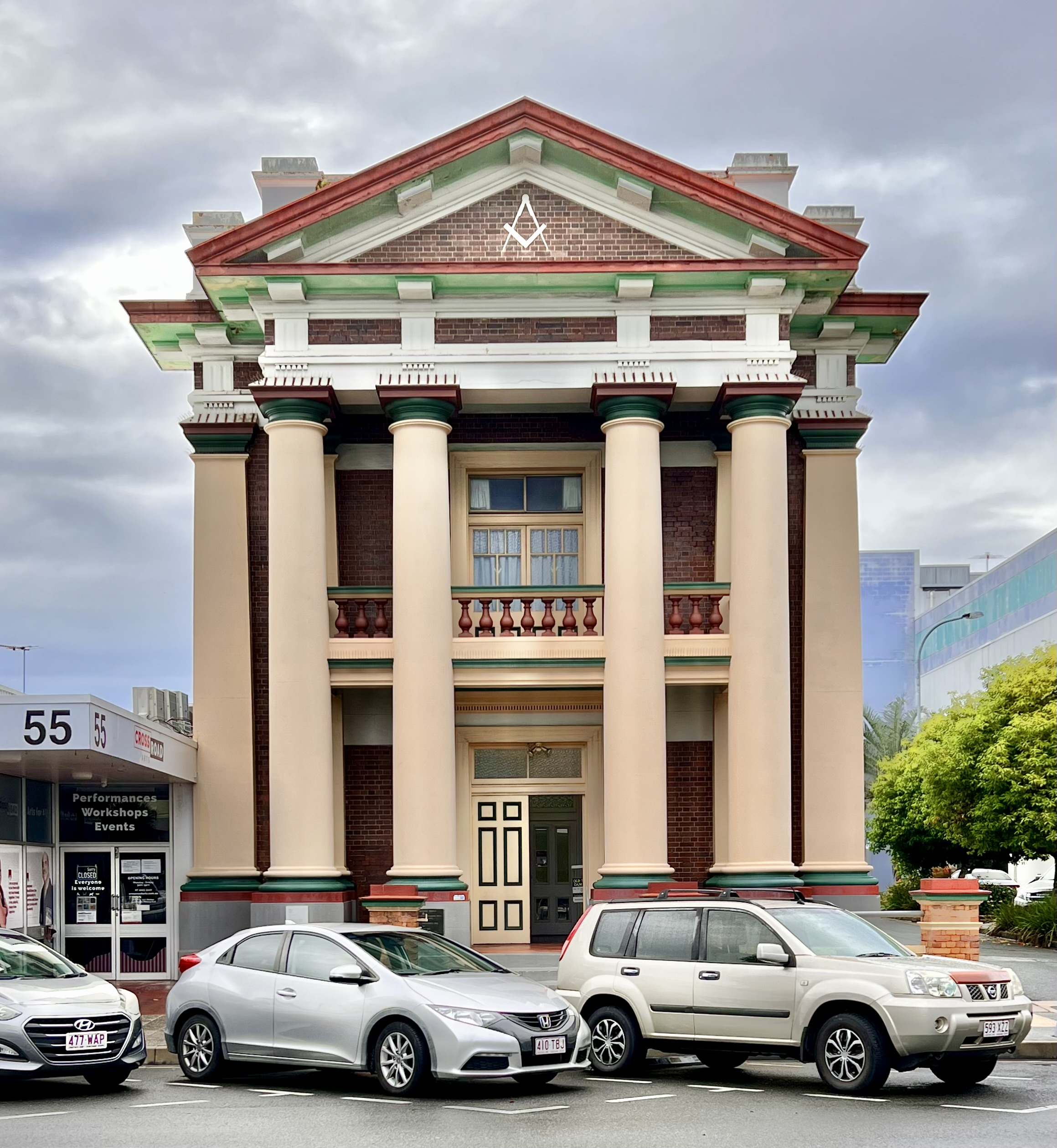
- Mackay Masonic Hall, 2023

- Location within Queensland Location within Australia
- 21.1427°S 149.1859°E
- Location: 57 Wood Street, Mackay, Mackay Region, Queensland, Australia

History
- Design period: 1919–1930s (interwar period)
- Built: 1925

Site notes
- Architect: F H Faircloth
- Architectural style: Classicism

Queensland Heritage Register
- Official name: Mackay Masonic Temple, Masonic Temple Masonic Hall
- Type: state heritage (built)
- Designated: 14 August 2009
- Reference no.: 602731
- Significant period: 1925–
- Builders: William Patrick Guthrie

Mackay Masonic Temple is a heritage-listed masonic temple at 57 Wood Street, Mackay, Mackay Region, Queensland, Australia. It was designed by F. H. Faircloth and built in 1925 by William Ptrick Guthrie. It is also known as Masonic Hall. It was added to the Queensland Heritage Register on 14 August 2009.

== History ==
The Mackay Masonic Temple (1924) was built during a period of rapid growth in Mackay, the administrative centre of a thriving sugar industry. The fine and substantial temple was built as a joint venture among three local Freemasonry lodges.

Freemasonry was established in Queensland in 1859 when dispensation was granted by the Provisional Grand Lodge of New South Wales (English Constitution), authorising what was then the most northerly lodge in Australia: the North Australian Lodge of Brisbane.

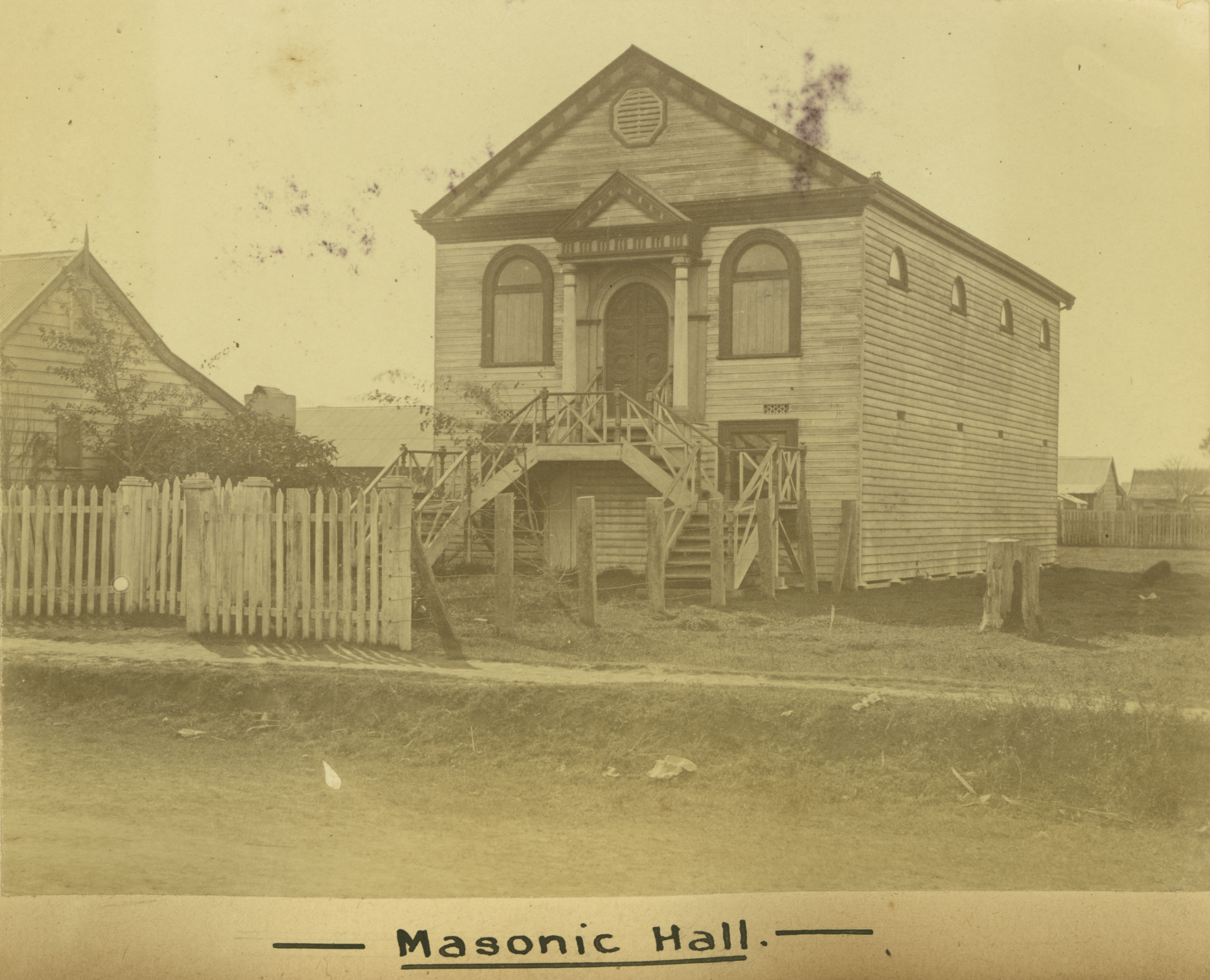
First timber masonic temple in Mackay, circa 1880

The Mackay Lodge first met in the Oddfellows' Hall in Wood Street on 24 June 1875. On 23 February 1880 it moved into the original two-storey timber Masonic Hall, using this hall until January 1918 when it was destroyed by the 1918 cyclone that devastated much of Mackay.

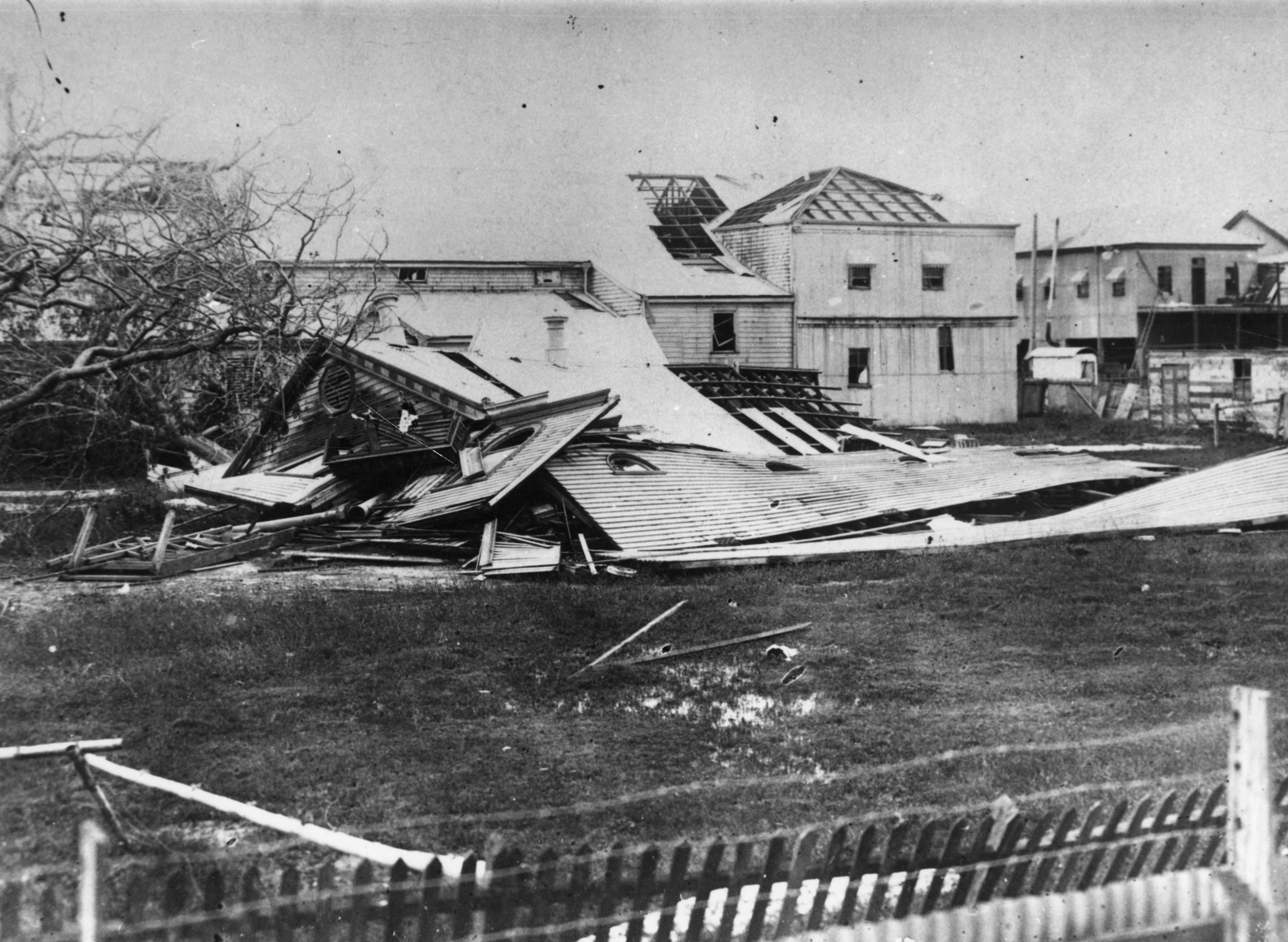
First Masonic Hall in Mackay destroyed by cyclone, 1918

Following this disaster, Mackay enjoyed a period of substantial growth through the 1920s and 1930s, even during the period of financial hardship and unemployment caused by the Depression. It was the fastest growing town in Queensland, its population almost doubling between 1923 and 1940. This was largely due to the linking of Mackay by the North Coast railway line to Rockhampton in 1921 and to Townsville in 1923, which improved access to markets and reduced transport costs, thus boosting not only the sugar industry, but also the developing dairy and tourist industries. The local Member of Queensland Legislative Assembly, William Forgan Smith, was Premier of Queensland between 1932 and 1940 and supported the growth of the region. In the 1930s major public works were undertaken in Mackay to improve the infrastructure of the town and upgrade the harbour.

The development of Mackay in the 1930s also owed much to its mayor, Ian Wood. Becoming mayor in 1930 at the age of 29, he energetically promoted the area, opening a travel agency in the early 1930s. Wood was instrumental in developing an airport and Eungella National Park and served as mayor or alderman for most of the period between 1927 and 1973. He was a Senator of Australia between 1949 and 1978 and was also a member and president of the Chamber of Commerce.

After the destruction of the original hall, the local lodges met again in the Oddfellows' Hall until three lodges (Mackay 24, Temple 31 and Caledonia 34) combined in a joint venture to build a new temple on a grander scale. The Mackay Masonic Trust was formed and the foundation stone for the temple was laid on 8 March 1924. The temple was consecrated on 13 June 1925 by the Most Worshipful Deputy Grand Master Brother R.W.F. Quinn.

Masonic temples (also known as lodges) all follow a similar layout designed to accommodate the Masonic rituals. The main ceremonies are held in a rectangular room called the lodge. It has a tiled central mosaic pavement with tessellated border. Seating is arranged around the room so that all members are able to observe ceremonies conducted in the centre of the room. An elevated seat is located at the eastern side of the room for the Worshipful Master. Elevated seats are also provided at the western and southern sides for the Senior Warden and the Junior Warden. The room usually contains an altar with three candles and two pillars supporting globes. The architecture, furniture and decoration of lodges are rich in symbology. Among the most prominent symbols are the compass and square and the letter "G". Lodges often also contain social rooms, dining rooms and other spaces.

The building's architect, F.H. Faircloth, died before its completion. He was born in Maryborough in 1870 and was a pupil of German-trained Bundaberg architect Anton Hettrich. He set up his own practice in Bundaberg in 1893 and was very prolific, eventually being responsible for the design of almost every major building in Bundaberg. He also made a major contribution to the appearance and character of Childers after a fire devastated the main street in 1902. His designs in Childers include the Isis Masonic Lodge. Other examples of his work include the Bundaberg War Memorial, the Queensland National Bank at Maryborough and St Patricks Church at Mount Perry.

The temple was built by brothers Frank & William Guthrie at a cost of £6500. The Guthries, from Bundaberg, originally planned to stay at Mackay for 12 months to complete the National Australia Bank. Instead, they stayed in Mackay a further 36 years and constructed many other local buildings including the Daily Mercury building, and the Ambassador, Australian, Metropolitan, Prince of Wales, Shamrock, Taylor's and Wilkinson's hotels.

In 1959 the temple was extended, with a shop fronting Wood Street added to the north side. Also added to the north side were a meeting room for the Masons, with two kitchen areas (one being the main kitchen the other an ancillary kitchen) and toilets. The extensions to the rear of the building incorporate offices that are leased to other organisations or businesses. To enable these extensions to proceed, the original (1925) kitchen and toilet area were demolished.

The building was renovated in 1985 and painted inside and out. A further $351,000 was spent on extensions and renovations in 1994. Mackay firm Sanders, Turner & Ellick were the architects for the project and the builders were T.F. Woollam & Sons.

Lodges currently meeting at the temple are Mackay 24, Temple 31, Caledonia 34 and Star of the North 401.

== Description ==
The Mackay Masonic Temple is located in the Mackay central business district on the corner of Wood Street and Ninth Lane. It is a two-storey masonry building, rectangular in plan form, with parapets concealing a gabled roof clad in metal sheeting. The Temple and a single storey addition at the rear cover the majority of the allotment. A low red brick fence with rendered detailing and a pipe rail between engaged piers fronts Wood Street and a short forecourt lies between the fence and building facade.

The most striking feature of the Temple is the west-facing portico formed by four massive columns and entablature in the Doric Order. Its pediment contains the masonic compass and square symbols fixed to a brick-lined tympanum, and above the pediment, a brick parapet detailed with string coursing and engaged piers projects forward over the portico.

From Wood Street, three concrete steps between the inner columns provide access to the portico behind which the main wall of dark red, salt glazed bricks is flanked by pairs of rendered masonry pilasters. Centrally located in this wall are pairs of six-panel timber doors with fanlights above at ground level, providing entry to the building and at first floor level providing access to the balcony. Wide moulded architraves surround the openings.

The concrete balcony to the first floor spans the space within the portico and is detailed with a moulded concrete balustrade containing urn-shaped balusters.

The south elevation is more simply detailed and is rendered and finished with an ashlar pattern. There are seven square metal-framed windows to the upper level and four rectangular metal-framed windows lower level. The north and rear elevations are similarly detailed. Extensions on the north side of building include a shop fronting Wood Street and a meeting room for the Masons, with two kitchens (the main kitchen and an ancillary kitchen) and toilets. The extensions to the rear of the building incorporate offices occupied by other organisations or businesses. The extensions to the north and rear are not of cultural heritage significance.

On the lower level, the double doors open into a foyer with a small storage room to the right and stairs at the left leading to the upper level. Double, glass panelled doors lead into the main hall. The Masonic compass and square symbol is etched into each of the upper panels. There is a frosted glass rectangular fanlight above the door. A wide moulded architrave surrounds the door and fanlight.

The main hall has polished timber floors and high timber lined ceilings. The walls are lined with sheeting and are detailed with a dado. Cupboards line the walls either side of the entrance doors. A door and windows to the north wall of the hall have been blocked by the extensions.

The first floor is accessed by a timber L-shaped staircase with carved balustrade. The risers are carpeted and the treads are lined with a dark rubberised material. A rail for a chair lift is fitted to the stairs along the wall.

The lodge room is located on the upper level. This is a large room with a black and white tiled floor laid in a chequerboard pattern. The walls are lined with sheeting and there are pilasters at regular intervals. The windows on the southern and northern walls are covered with dark curtains.

There are raised platforms at the middle of the eastern, southern and western walls. They are at varying heights. The highest and largest is on the eastern side, it is three steps high, the second highest, two steps high, is on the western side and the lowest, one step high, is on the southern side. All contain a pediment and at least one chair. For each of the pediments, a wooden column bearing a metal Masonic symbol is located to the right from the perspective of a person seated in the chair.

The eastern platform occupies the whole of the end of the room opposite the entrance. A central section is higher than the rest of the platform. Across the front, two steps provide access to the top; a third step provides access to the central section. Five ornate chairs are arranged across this section with the pediment located in front of the centre chair. The symbol of a carpenter's square is depicted on the front of this pediment. On either side of the central section, on the lower part of the platform, is a row of benches. Another pediment is located a short distance in front of the centre of the platform; a circular symbol is depicted on the front.

At the western and southern sides, the platforms are occupied by only a single chair and the pediment. On these sides only, a cube-form masonry block with a metal ring fitted in the top is located on the left side of the pediment from the perspective of a person seated in the chair.

There is a row of padded wooden benches against the southern and western walls. Immediately in front of these is a row of plain wooden benches similar to church pews.

In the middle of the floor is a rectangular pattern of black and white tiles in chequerboard pattern separated from the rest of the floor by a wide margin with a stylised rope tassel at each corner.

The pressed metal ceiling is coved and ribbed. Ribs along the sides and at each end mark the transition between the coving and the flat portion of the ceiling. The ceiling is divided into equal, rectangular sections by ribs running across its width. The ribs extend down the coving to the cornice. There is a decorative pattern along the top of the ribs and inside each of the rectangular sections. A letter "G" suspends from a hook in the centre of the ceiling.

On either side of the platform on the western wall are panelled wooden doors. A wide architrave surrounds the door openings and the rectangular, red glass lights. The lights are etched with the Masonic compass and square emblem. The door to the north of the platform has a small peep-hole with a sliding cover.

The southern door opens into a small room with a varnished wooden dado. Padded benches line the walls. The windows are covered with dark blue curtains similar to the lodge room.

The northern door opens into a smaller room. This has a varnished timber architrave. There is another wooden, panelled door opposite the doorway into the lodge room.

== Heritage listing ==
Mackay Masonic Temple was listed on the Queensland Heritage Register on 14 August 2009 having satisfied the following criteria.

The place is important in demonstrating the evolution or pattern of Queensland's history.

As a fine and substantial building, the Mackay Masonic Temple (1924) is important in demonstrating the prosperity enjoyed by Queensland's sugar-growing districts at the time of its construction. During the 1920s and 1930s, Mackay was the fastest growing town in Queensland.

The temple is also evidence of an important phase in the development of this regional centre. Replacing an earlier temple that was destroyed by a devastating cyclone in 1918, it was built during a period of reconstruction and rapid development in Mackay that included a major civic program of beautification and modernisation of services.

The place is important in demonstrating the principal characteristics of a particular class of cultural places.

The building is important in demonstrating the principal characteristics of a substantial Masonic Temple. These include the front facade with its Doric order columns, the lower level function area, and the upper level lodge room. The lodge room follows a standard plan with central mosaic pavement, elevated seats for the Master and principal officers, seating arranged around the perimeter of the room for members and the prominent display of Masonic symbols.

The temple is also important in demonstrating the work of F.H. Faircloth, a prolific regional architect who practised in the late 19th and early 20th century. Faircloth was responsible for the design of many major buildings in Bundaberg and Childers including the Isis Masonic Lodge at Childers and the Queensland National Bank at Mackay.

The place is important because of its aesthetic significance.

As a well composed, landmark building that is an excellent example of the Doric classical temple tradition, the Mackay Masonic Temple is important for its aesthetic significance. The building is visually pleasing for its regularity and symmetry, the contrast between exposed brick and stucco finishes on its facade, and the integration of Masonic symbolism into the design.

The place has a strong or special association with a particular community or cultural group for social, cultural or spiritual reasons.

The Mackay Masonic Temple has a strong and special association with several Masonic lodges in the Mackay region as their principal meeting place since 1924.
