= Boolboonda State School =

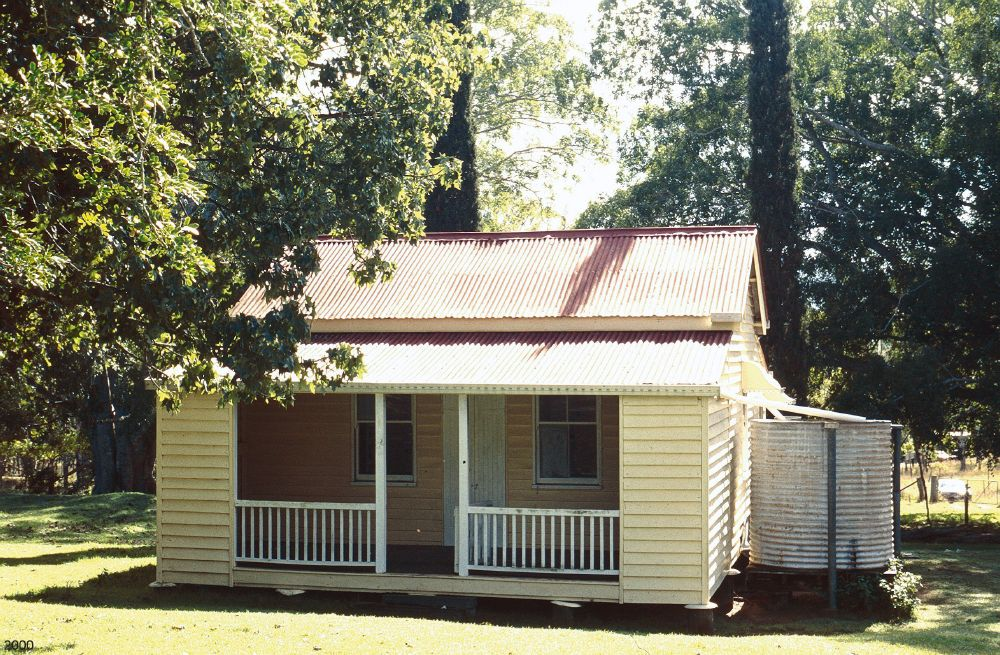
- Boolboonda State School, 2000

- Location within Queensland Location within Australia
- 25.0829°S 151.6812°E
- Location: Boolboonda Tunnel Road, Boolboonda, Bundaberg Region, Queensland, Australia

History
- Design period: 1870s–1890s (late 19th century)
- Built: 1896–1911

Site notes
- Architect: Department of Public Works

Queensland Heritage Register
- Official name: Boolboonda State Primary School (former)
- Type: state heritage (built)
- Designated: 25 August 2000
- Reference no.: 602172
- Significant period: 1890s–1910s (historical); 1890s–1910s (fabric); 1890s–1973 (social)
- Significant components: school/school room

Boolboonda State School is a heritage-listed former state school at Boolboonda Tunnel Road, Boolboonda, Bundaberg Region, Queensland, Australia. It was designed by the Department of Public Works and built from 1896 to 1911. It was added to the Queensland Heritage Register on 25 August 2000.

== History ==
A provisional school had been established with the construction of the Mount Perry railway line opening on 25 September 1882 to service the educational needs of children of railway workers employed by the contractors O'Rourke & McSharry. The original school closed with the completion of the Bundaberg-Mount Perry railway line in 1884. In 1896 a local committee proposed that the Department of Public Instruction establish a school for local children of the Boolboonda area. The school opened in 1897 and in 1909 was declared a State School. It was closed for enrolments in 1973.

The Mount Perry railway (originally known as the Bundaberg Railway) was built by the Queensland Government to service the Mount Perry copper mines. The construction of the railway line to Mount Perry opened up the district to large scale commerce whereby freighting of grain increased from 197 long tons (200 t) in 1882 to 766 long tons (778 t) in 1886 and timber from the nearby Watawa area grew from 3 long tons (3.0 t) in 1883 to 3,753 long tons (3,813 t) in 1884. With the advent of the railway, a growing number of families settled in the area, especially those associated with the maintenance of the Mount Perry railway line. It was these local families that agitated for the establishment of a school. Enrolments were received from the farming component of the community, railway workers, and also with miners associated with the exploitation of wolfram and molybdenite in the Boolboonda area.

The first letter of application for the establishment of a school at Boolboonda was sent on behalf of four residents with twenty children aged between five and thirteen, all living within a ten kilometre radius of the proposed school location. The nearest school maintained by the Queensland Government was at Drummer's Creek (Dingle Dell) some eight kilometres distant. A building committee was elected on 16 May 1896, consisting of William Wormington, Peter Campbell and Henry McDade.

The original proposed site was to be on ten acres of land, to the north of the Mount Perry railway line. The Department of Public Instruction applied for the use of this land which was part of the railway reserve. The Railway Department rejected this request, and instead selected a second location on the southern side of the railway line, all being part of a forfeited mineral lease. Construction of the building took place between October 1896 and January 1897, although surveying of the proposed school reserve still had yet to be undertaken.

The school was completed on 23 January 1897, and was inspected by the head teacher at Mount Perry State School. Cost of the building totalled £97/14/0. The school was opened as a provisional school on 22 March 1897, the first teacher appointed was Kate Ruddy, and some twenty-four children were enrolled in first year.

The concept of a provisional school was developed to cope with increase in the number of new settlements and townships in the latter part of the nineteenth century. The government developed a criterion whereby a minimum of 30 children was required in an area before a school would be erected. In areas such as Boolboonda, where this criterion could not be met, the government gave financial assistance to local committees to establish provisional schools. Provisional schools were regarded as an interim measure until a state school could be built and were often hastily erected by voluntary labour using basic materials. These schools were seen as a convenient means of providing elementary education throughout the colony and soon became an integral part of the educational landscape.

In 1909 the school changed in status from a Provisional to a State School, Class 10. Some two years later with the increasing number of enrolments (38 in 1911), the school committee requested that an additional verandah be constructed. The work was carried out in September for a cost of £29/15/0.

The Boolboonda State School in the period of 1916–23 experienced a great deal of tension and conflict between some of the school committee members and the head teachers (themselves local people). An inquiry was conducted in 1922, a result of which was the transfer of a local teacher and the appointment of one from outside of the district.

The average number of children who attended the Boolboonda State School varied from 16 children in 1897 to a high of 25 children in 1903, and again in 1922. Attendances climbed at the end of the 1940s and remained high until the middle of the 1950s. Numbers then averaged at around 16 until the middle of the 1960s but experienced a decline post 1966. With a declining attendance of local children of around seven in the period of 1967–1972, the decision was taken to close the Boolboonda State School in February 1973.

From 1897 until its closure in 1973 some eighteen teachers taught at the Boolboonda State School. The longest serving of these was Margaret Campbell who was teacher at Boolboonda from 1926 until 1958.

After closure the Boolboonda State School grounds and building were then held in trust by local residents and used as a community meeting area until the Kolan Shire Council became trustee in the early 1980s. The land is now a Reserve for Park and Recreation with the Kolan Shire Council as Trustee of the reserve and building.

== Description ==
The Boolboonda State School is located at Tunnel Road, Boolboonda on a large portion of land which slopes gently away from the road entry. The school building is sited well back from the road amongst a cluster mature trees, of mixed species, which create an intimate sense of enclosure around the structure. An earth closet is located to the rear of the school building further up the slope.

The school building is a timber framed and weatherboard clad structure, rectangular in plan and elevated slightly above the ground on timber stumps. The roof is clad with corrugated metal sheeting and consists of a central gable and verandah skillion roofs to the front and rear of the building. Timber louvred vents punctuate both gable ends. Storm water from the roof is collected in two corrugated metal sheet water tanks located on the eastern side of the building.

Entry to the school is by a set of stairs to the front northern verandah which appears to have once extended the entire width of the building. This verandah is now enclosed at the eastern end. The rear verandah is a later addition to the building and is partially enclosed at both ends creating a semi enclosed space. The balustrade to the front verandah consists of a top and middle rail while the rear verandah balustrade has a top and bottom rail with timber batten infill.

Windows to the building are all double hung however vary from a six pane configuration on the eastern and western elevations to a four pane configuration on the northern and southern elevations On the western elevation a timber framed sun hood shelter a bank of three double hung windows while on the eastern face metal sunhoods are set over single double hung windows set central to the school building and verandah enclosure.

Internally the school building is a single volume space with a small verandah enclosure in the north east corner. The floor is unfinished timber boarding and the walls and ceiling are lined with timber tongue-and-groove boards. The ceiling follows the gable roof form but is truncated across the apex of the roof.

The outhouse to the rear of the school building is timber framed and clad with weatherboards and has a simple vertical timber batten screen to its entry. The roof is a single sheet of curved corrugated metal sheeting.

== Heritage listing ==
The former Boolboonda State School was listed on the Queensland Heritage Register on 25 August 2000 having satisfied the following criteria.

The place is important in demonstrating the evolution or pattern of Queensland's history.

As an intact example of a provisional school constructed at the end of the nineteenth century and with little change or modification to the building, it serves as an important reminder of the development of state education to rural communities throughout the nineteenth and twentieth centuries.

The place is important because of its aesthetic significance.

The grounds include a variety of mature plantings that create a picturesque surround to the school buildings.

The place has a strong or special association with a particular community or cultural group for social, cultural or spiritual reasons.

The Boolboonda School, as with many educational institutions, forms a strong axis around which the community revolves. The Boolboonda and surrounding district residents have used the school for educational purposes, as a meeting place, for public functions and over the years has been a central gathering place for the residents of the area. The community's sense of association with the place has been strengthened by the fact that the residents of the Boolboonda area paid for the purchase of the land and former school following its closure. Accordingly, the educational component of the cultural heritage of community would be retained within the community.
