= Nearum, Queensland =

Nearum
- Suburb
- Interactive map of Nearum
- Coordinates: 25.0663°S 151.8144°E
- Country: Australia
- State: Queensland
- LGA: Bundaberg Region
- Location: 25.2 km (15.7 mi) SW of Gin Gin; 73.8 km (45.9 mi) WSW of Bundaberg CBD; 379 km (235 mi) NNW of Brisbane

Government
  - State electorate: Callide
  - Federal division: Flynn

Area
  - Total: 85.5 km^{2} (33.0 sq mi)

Population
  - Total: 24 (2021 census)
  - Density: 0.281/km^{2} (0.727/sq mi)
- Time zone: UTC+10:00 (AEST)
- Postcode: 4671
Suburbs around Nearum
New Moonta	Moolboolaman	Moolboolaman
New Moonta	Nearum	Horse Camp
Mount Perry	Doughboy	Doughboy

Nearum is a rural locality in the Bundaberg Region, Queensland, Australia. In the 2021 census, Nearum had a population of 24 people.

== Geography ==
Nearum Road traverses the locality, entering from the west (New Moonta) and exiting to the south-east (Doughboy / Horse Camp).

The land use is grazing on native vegetation.

== History ==
The Mount Perry railway line was extended through Nearum to Boolboonda on 12 November 1883, with the locality served by the Goyan railway station (25.0666°S 151.7666°E). This section of railway was closed in 1960 and removed in 1961, due to declining traffic revenues.

== Demographics ==
In the 2016 census, Nearum had a population of 4 people.

In the 2021 census, Nearum had a population of 24 people.

== Education ==
There are no schools in Nearum. The nearest government primary and secondary schools are Gin Gin State School and Gin Gin State High School, both in Gin Gin to the north-east.
