= Wonbah Forest, Queensland =

Wonbah Forest
- Suburb
- Interactive map of Wonbah Forest
- Coordinates: 24.9872°S 151.6177°E
- Country: Australia
- State: Queensland
- LGA: Bundaberg Region
- Location: 25.1 km (15.6 mi) N of Mount Perry; 46.3 km (28.8 mi) W of Gin Gin; 95.4 km (59.3 mi) ESE of Bundaberg; 408 km (254 mi) NNW of Brisbane

Government
  - State electorate: Callide
  - Federal division: Flynn

Area
  - Total: 161.8 km^{2} (62.5 sq mi)

Population
  - Total: 0 (2021 census)
  - Density: 0.0000/km^{2} (0.000/sq mi)
- Time zone: UTC+10:00 (AEST)
- Postcode: 4671
Suburbs around Wonbah Forest
Yarrol	Gaeta	Takilberan
Yarrol	Wonbah Forest	New Moonta
Yarrol	Wonbah	Boolboonda

Wonbah Forest is a rural locality in the Bundaberg Region, Queensland, Australia. In the 2021 census, Wonbah Forest had "no people or a very low population".

== Geography ==
The Wonbah Road enters the locality from the north (Gaeta) and proceeds south through the locality, exiting to the south (Wonbah).

Part of the Bania National Park is in the north of the locality while the Wonbah State Forest is in the north-east, east and south of the locality. Apart from these protected areas, the land use is predominantly grazing on native vegetation.

== Demographics ==
In the 2016 census, Wonbah Forest had a population of 5 people.

In the 2021 census, Wonbah Forest had "no people or a very low population".

== Education ==
There are no schools in Wonbah Forest. The nearest government primary school is Mount Perry State School in Mount Perry to the south. The nearest government secondary school is Gin Gin State High School in Gin Gin to the east. However, students living in the south-west of Wonbah Forest might be too distant to attend Gin Gin State High School; the alternatives are distance education and boarding school.
