= New Moonta =

- Suburb
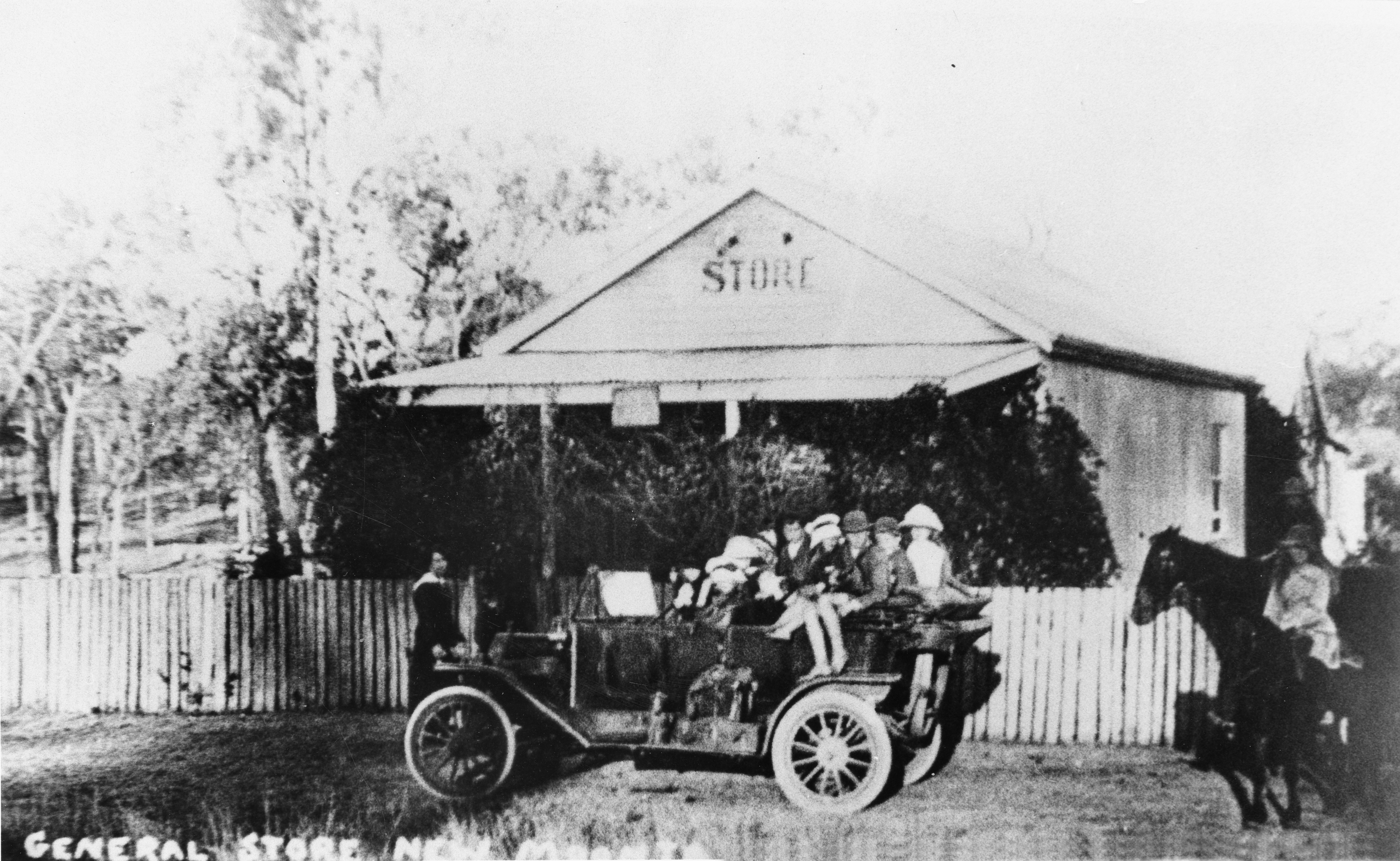
- General store, New Moonta

- Interactive map of New Moonta
- Coordinates: 25.0247°S 151.7288°E
- Country: Australia
- State: Queensland
- LGA: Bundaberg Region
- Location: 25.9 km (16.1 mi) W of Gin Gin; 75.1 km (46.7 mi) WSW of Bundaberg CBD; 388 km (241 mi) NNW of Brisbane

Government
  - State electorate: Callide
  - Federal division: Flynn

Area
  - Total: 78.4 km^{2} (30.3 sq mi)

Population
  - Total: 78 (2021 census)
  - Density: 0.995/km^{2} (2.577/sq mi)
- Time zone: UTC+10:00 (AEST)
- Postcode: 4671
Suburbs around New Moonta
Wonbah Forest	Takilberan	Moolboolaman
Boolboonda	New Moonta	Moolboolaman
Boolboonda	Mount Perry	Nearum

New Moonta is a rural locality in the Bundaberg Region, Queensland, Australia. In the 2021 census, New Moonta had a population of 78 people.

== History ==
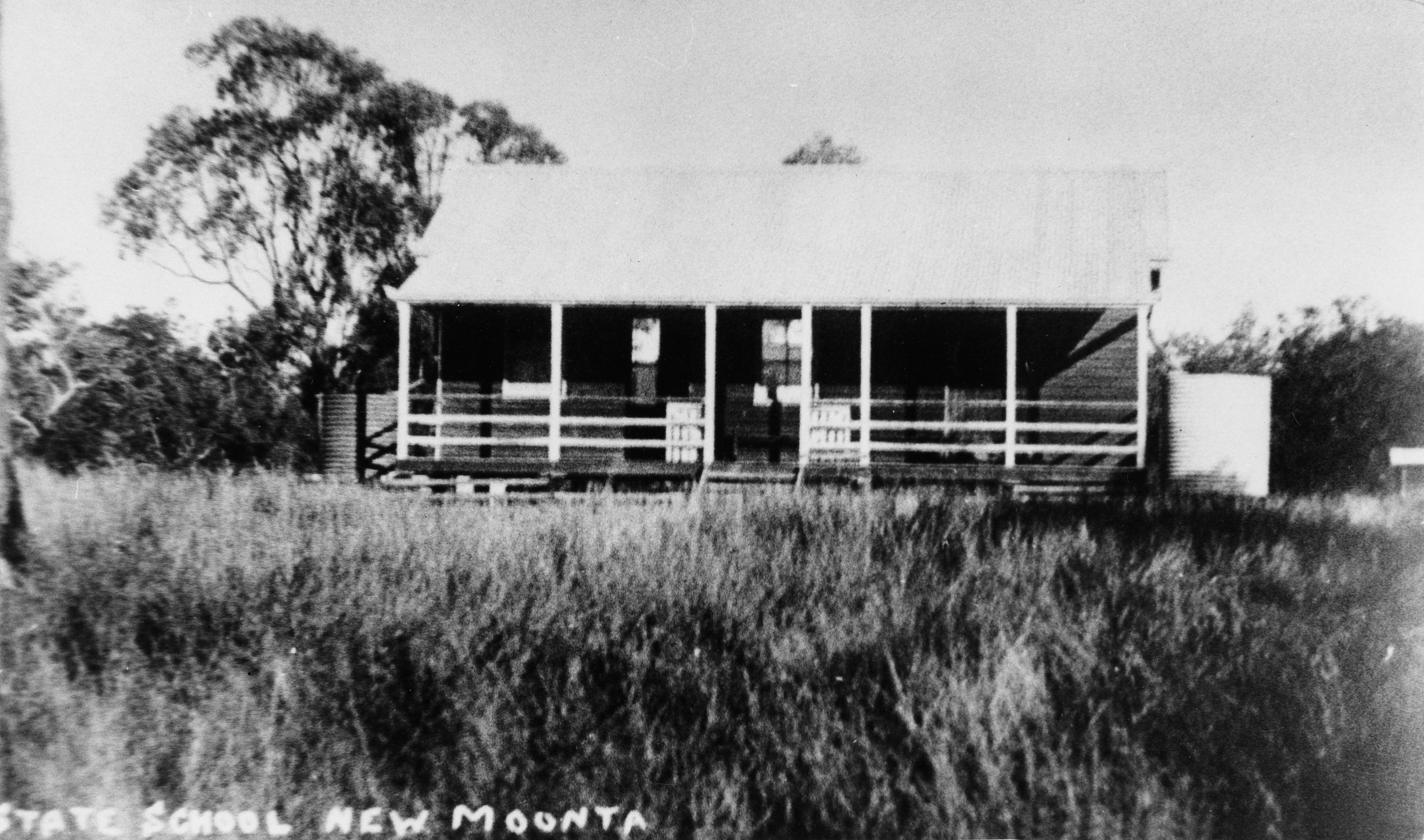
New Moonta State School

The Mount Perry railway line opened to Boolboonda on 12 November 1883, with New Moonta being served by the Ellimatta railway station (25.0775°S 151.7277°E).

The local miners began to lobby for a school in October 1903. Tenders were called in January 1904 to erect a provisional school. The school building was completed in May 1904. New Moonta Provisional School opened on 4 July 1904 under teacher Miss Ruddy. On 1 January 1909, it became New Moonta State School. It closed in 1926. It was at 209 Nellers Road (25.03758°S 151.72032°E).

The Mount Perry railway line through New Moonta closed on 31 October 1960.

== Demographics ==
In the 2016 census, New Moonta had a population of 63 people.

In the 2021 census, New Moonta had a population of 78 people.

== Education ==
There are no schools at New Moonta. The nearest government primary schools are Mount Perry State School in neighbouring Mount Perry to the south and Gin Gin State School in Gin Gin to the east. The nearest government secondary school is Gin Gin State High School, also in Gin Gin.
