= Boolboonda =

- Suburb
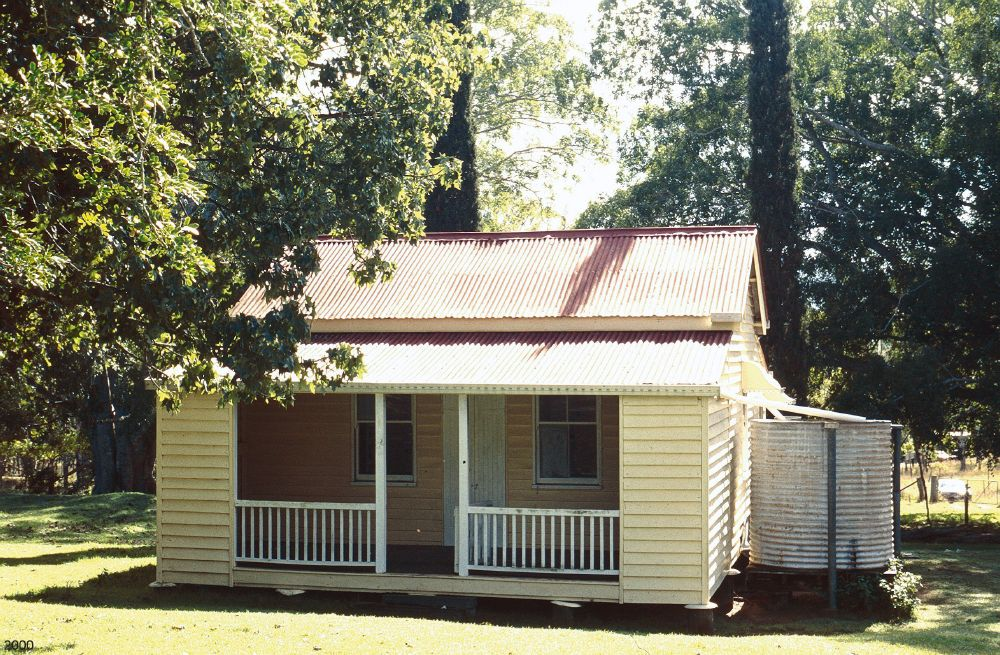
- Former Boolboonda State School, 2000

- Interactive map of Boolboonda
- Coordinates: 25.0594°S 151.69°E
- Country: Australia
- State: Queensland
- LGA: Bundaberg Region
- Location: 32.6 km (20.3 mi) WSW of Gin Gin; 81.8 km (50.8 mi) WSW of Bundaberg; 402 km (250 mi) NNW of Brisbane

Government
  - State electorate: Callide
  - Federal division: Flynn

Area
  - Total: 34.7 km^{2} (13.4 sq mi)

Population
  - Total: 55 (2021 census)
  - Density: 1.585/km^{2} (4.11/sq mi)
- Time zone: UTC+10:00 (AEST)
- Postcode: 4671
Suburbs around Boolboonda
Wonbah Forest	New Moonta	New Moonta
Wonbah	Boolboonda	New Moonta
Wonbah	Mount Perry	Mount Perry

Boolboonda is a rural locality in the Bundaberg Region, Queensland, Australia. In the 2021 census, Boolboonda had a population of 55 people.

== History ==
The name Boolboonda is reported an Aboriginal word created by local people to represent the sound of blasting to excavate the railway tunnel on the Mount Perry railway line which was built from 1882 to 1884.

Boolboonda Provisional School opened on 25 September 1882 but closed circa 1884. It reopened circa 1897, becoming Boolboonda State School on 1 January 1909. It closed on 9 February 1973. The school was located south of Tunnel Road (25.0829°S 151.6812°E).

== Demographics ==
In the 2016 census, Boolboonda had a population of 52 people.

In the 2021 census, Boolboonda had a population of 55 people.

== Heritage listings ==
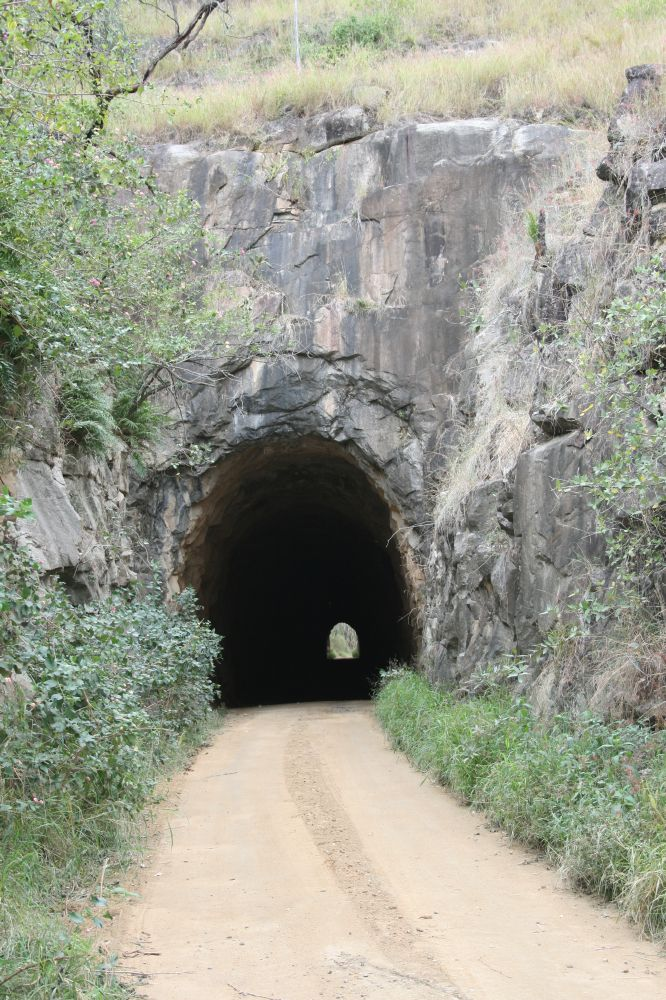
Boolboonda Railway Tunnel western portal, 2009

Boolboonda has the following heritage listings:

- Boolboonda State School, Boolboonda Tunnel Road
- Boolboonda Tunnel, Boolboonda Tunnel Road

== Education ==
There are no schools in Boolboonda. The nearest government primary school is Mount Perry State School in neighbouring Mount Perry to the south. The nearest government secondary school is Gin Gin State High School in Gin Gin to the east.

== Amenities ==
Boolboonda Memorial Hall is at 3064 Gin Gin-Mount Perry Road (25.06574°S 151.69358°E).
