= St Patrick's Church, Mount Perry =

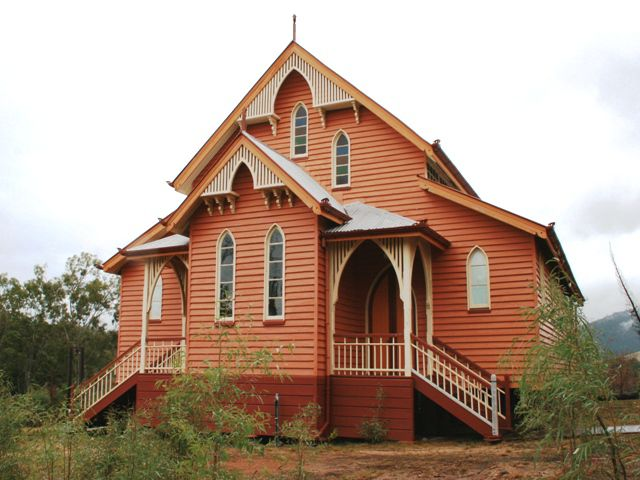
- St Patricks Church, 2009
- St Patrick's Church, Mount Perry
- 25°10′47″S 151°38′32″E
- Address: 18 Pearson Street, Mount Perry, North Burnett Region, Queensland
- Country: Australia
- Denomination: Roman Catholic
- Website: www.childerscatholic.net

History
- Status: Church
- Consecrated: 12 February 1905

Architecture
- Architect: F H Faircloth
- Architectural type: Church
- Style: Gothic Revival
- Completed: 1904

Specifications
- Materials: Timber

Administration
- Archdiocese: Brisbane
- Parish: Childers

Queensland Heritage Register
- Official name: St Patricks Church
- Type: State heritage (built)
- Designated: 21 October 1992
- Reference no.: 600764
- Significant period: 1900s, 1930s (historical); 1900s (fabric) ongoing (social)
- Significant components: Church, furniture/fittings
- Builders: John Guthrie

St Patricks Church is a heritage-listed Roman Catholic church at 18 Pearson, Mount Perry, North Burnett Region, Queensland, Australia. It was designed by F H Faircloth and built in 1904 by John Guthrie. It was added to the Queensland Heritage Register on 21 October 1992.

== History ==
St Patrick's Roman Catholic Church was constructed in 1904 in the then important copper mining town of Mount Perry.

The township of Mount Perry, about 100 kilometres (62 mi) west of Bundaberg, was established following the discovery of copper in the vicinity in 1869. The first Roman Catholic priest to visit Mount Perry was Father James Horan who was based in Gayndah in 1870. He is thought to have made arrangements for the construction of a church, although work did not begin until after he had left for Peak Downs in November 1872. The church was completed under the direction of the succeeding priest at Gayndah, Father C Rossolini, though its form is not known.

The population of the township quickly grew and 20 hotels sprang up in Mount Perry in the early 1870s, reflecting the high proportion of men without families on the field. However, the copper mine ceased operations in October 1877 and was sold by liquidators in January 1878 on the expectation that it would not be re-opened until the Mount Perry railway line was completed. This occurred in 1884, linking Mount Perry with Bundaberg. Mount Perry became the railhead for the Upper Burnett and a major centre; now having nine hotels including 6 newly built ones, a courthouse, hospital and a School of Arts. However, after a period of growth the town declined, until the mine closed in 1891 due to a fall in the price of copper. In 1893, Father Rossolini, by then based in Bundaberg, died. Father Mimnagh, who had assisted him, took over as parish priest in Bundaberg and continued to minister to Mount Perry. He served as Parish Priest of Bundaberg until 1917.

Matters in Mount Perry soon improved as the London-based Queensland Copper Company bought the mine in 1898, sparking a revival in the town, and by 1904 the population in the field was 2000. In 1903 ,an Anglican church was built at Mount Perry reflecting the growth of the town and by this time, the early Catholic church had presumably become inadequate for the congregation. In August 1904 tenders were called for a new church to be built to the plans of Bundaberg architect F H Faircloth at an estimated cost of £500.

Frederic Herbert (Herb) Faircloth was born in Maryborough in 1870 and was a pupil of German-trained Bundaberg architect Anton Hettrich. Faircloth set up his own practice in Bundaberg in 1893 and was very successful, eventually being responsible for the design of almost every important building in Bundaberg, including extensions to the Church of the Holy Rosary. He was also responsible for much of the rebuilding of the town centre of Childers following a major fire in 1902.

The first Mount Perry church was sold for removal in 1904 prior to the construction of the new church, which was completed by builder John Guthrie in 1905 for a cost, including furnishings, of £667. St Patrick's was consecrated on 12 February 1905 with over 400 people from the surrounding area in attendance. Soon after the building of the new church, Mount Perry was created a separate parish. Father Sullivan at first occupied the back of the church, using the choir loft as a bedroom and eating with a neighbouring family. A Presbytery was built by the Maynard Brothers in 1914, but has not survived.

Soon after this, the peak demand for copper passed and many mines closed. The mining venture at Mount Perry collapsed and the smelters in 1915 closed with a consequent dwindling of population. Many buildings were demolished or removed and Mount Perry was placed in the parish of Gayndah.

The parish was reopened with the arrival of Father Frawley in 1939 and in September that year Archbishop James Duhig visited Mount Perry and the surrounding area. In later years, Mount Perry became at various times part of Gin Gin, Gayndah and Childers Parishes. It is now part of the Gin Gin parish and has a visiting priest from that town.

The church building has changed little. Early photographs show a timber bell tower to the north of the church, but this did not survive and the bell is now mounted on a simple frame.

== Description ==
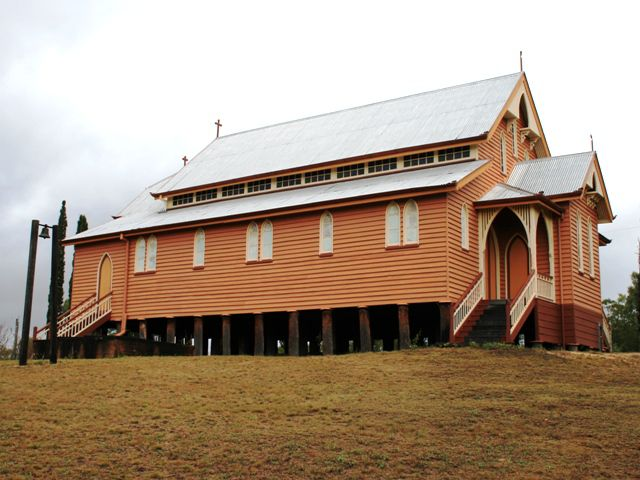
Side view of St Patricks, 2009

St Patrick's Church is an elevated timber-framed building situated on a prominent ridge overlooking the town of Mount Perry and is a dominant feature of its townscape.

The church is rectangular in plan, comprising a nave and side aisles and is clad in weatherboards. At the western end is a projecting gabled section housing a stairwell that accesses the choir loft. It is flanked by twin porches and stairs. The twin entrance doors are arched and this motif is echoed in decorative open timber work to the porches and to the gables of the portico and main roof. At the eastern end of the church is the sanctuary and adjoining vestry with a separate entrance on the northern side. The roof is clad with corrugated iron and is steeply pitched over the nave with aisle roofs springing from below clerestory windows. Crosses are located at the ends of the main roof and the gabled roof of the entrance portico.

The church is lit with timber-framed lancet windows placed alternately singly and in pairs. The triple lancet windows in the sanctuary are set with stained glass.

The interior of the church is very intact and the clear finish to internal lining boards and painted decorative trim appears to be that applied when the building was first constructed. Light fittings, hardware and furniture including altar, pews, statuary and a small harmonium are also original.

== Heritage listing ==
St Patricks Church was listed on the Queensland Heritage Register on 21 October 1992 having satisfied the following criteria.

The place is important in demonstrating the evolution or pattern of Queensland's history.

St Patrick's Church is important for its close association with the development of Mount Perry as a noted copper centre in the 19th and early 20th centuries, and with the development of Catholicism within the Diocese of Brisbane, both of which illustrate the pattern of Queensland history.

The place is important in demonstrating the principal characteristics of a particular class of cultural places.

St Patrick's is a good example of the Carpenter Gothic architectural style used in church construction.

The place is important because of its aesthetic significance.

The building has considerable aesthetic and architectural merit, and through its form, scale, materials, detailing and plantings and makes an important aesthetic contribution to the Mount Perry townscape. St Patrick's Church survives reasonably intact, with much of the original furnishings and finishes being retained.

The place has a strong or special association with a particular community or cultural group for social, cultural or spiritual reasons.

The place has a special association for local Catholics as a centre of Catholic worship and social gatherings throughout the 20th century.
