= Mount Perry Masonic Lodge =

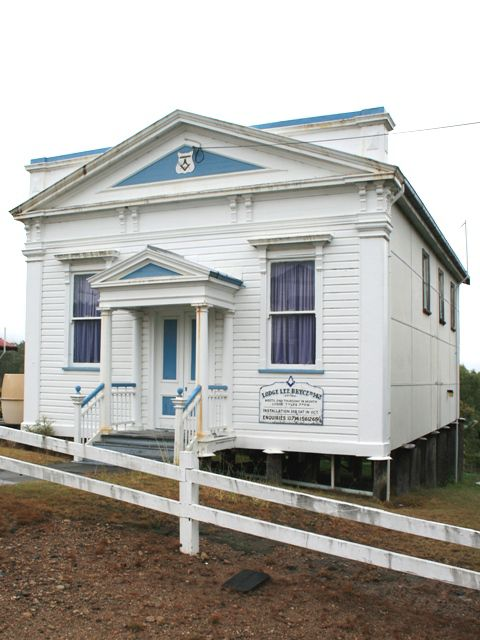
- Mount Perry Masonic Lodge, 2009

- Location within Queensland Location within Australia
- 25.1778°S 151.6437°E
- Location: Isabella Street, Mount Perry, North Burnett Region, Queensland, Australia

History
- Design period: 1900–1914 (early 20th century)
- Built: 1904

Site notes
- Architectural style: Classicism

Queensland Heritage Register
- Official name: Masonic Lodge
- Type: state heritage (built)
- Designated: 21 October 1992
- Reference no.: 600765
- Significant period: 1904 (fabric)

Mount Perry Masonic Lodge is a heritage-listed masonic temple at Isabella Street, Mount Perry, North Burnett Region, Queensland, Australia. It was built in 1904. It was added to the Queensland Heritage Register on 21 October 1992.

== History ==
The Masonic Hall at Mt Perry is a simple vernacular structure with an ornate classically inspired facade and was constructed around 1904 when Mt Perry was important as a copper mining town.

Freemasonry spread from New South Wales into Queensland in individual lodges. The first Freemason's lodge in Queensland was established in 1859, shortly before Separation from New South Wales. New lodges were formed as settlement spread.

The township of Mount Perry, about 100 kilometres (62 mi) west of Bundaberg, was established following the discovery of copper in the vicinity in 1869. The population of the township quickly grew and 20 hotels sprang up in Mount Perry in the early 1870s, reflecting the high proportion of men without families on the field. However, the copper mine ceased operations in October 1877 and was sold by liquidators in January 1878 on the expectation that it would not be re-opened until the railway was completed. This occurred in 1884, linking Mount Perry with Bundaberg. Mount Perry became the railhead for the Upper Burnett and a major centre; now having nine hotels including 6 newly built ones, a courthouse, hospital and a School of Arts. However, after a period of growth the town declined, until the mine closed in 1891 due to a fall in the price of copper. Matters in Mount Perry soon improved as the London-based Queensland Copper Company bought the mine in 1898, sparking a revival in the town, and by 1904 the population in the field was 2000.

In 1902 the Lee Bryce Lodge was consecrated and in 1904, Henry Yeoman, Robert McRae, George Hardlaw, Thomas Province and Robert Scott acquired the land on which the Masonic Hall was to be constructed on 17 June 1904. Yeoman was a cordial manufacturer; McRae a storekeeper, Hardlaw and Province were graziers and Scott the postmaster.

The fellowship associated with Freemasonry was particularly important to men living in areas of isolated or scattered settlement or in jobs that were itinerant or seasonal. Lodges hosted social events, contributed to local charities and provided opportunities for local businessmen to meet socially, all of which made an important contribution to the life the town.

By 1912 the peak demand for copper had passed and many mines closed. The mining venture at Mount Perry collapsed and the smelters closed in 1915 with a consequent dwindling of population. In the succeeding years many buildings were demolished or removed.

The Bryce Lodge No.142 of Ancient Free and Accepted Masons of Queensland and the United Grand Lodge of Queensland is still based on this hall.

== Description ==
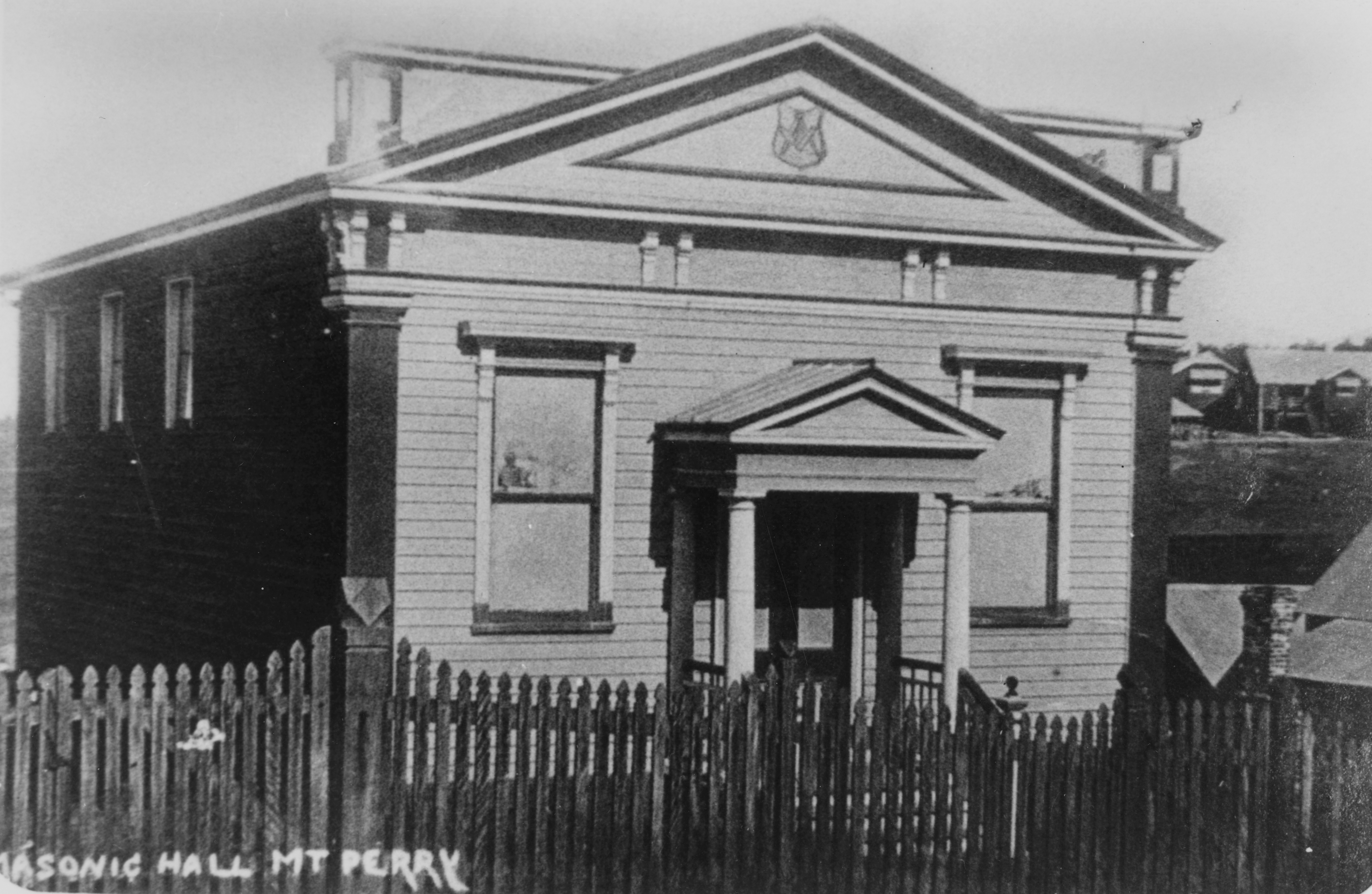
Masonic hall in Mount Perry

The Masonic Hall at Mt Perry is a single-storey, rectangular-plan timber building of exposed stud construction now clad with fibrous cement sheeting on the sides and rear. The building is at street level at the front and is raised on posts at the back as the ground falls away to the rear of the block. The gabled roof is concealed at the front by a parapet and the street elevation is classically inspired although carried out in timber. It has a full-width pediment supported by corner Tuscan pilasters. Framed beneath are two double hung windows flanking a central entry porch with a pedimented roof and supported by freestanding Tuscan columns.

In a striking contrast, the side and rear walls are completely plain and clad in fibrous cement sheeting. There are three plain rectangular windows placed high on both sides of the building towards the rear.

== Heritage listing ==
Masonic Lodge was listed on the Queensland Heritage Register on 21 October 1992 having satisfied the following criteria.

The place is important in demonstrating the evolution or pattern of Queensland's history.

The Masonic Hall is important in demonstrating the development of Mt Perry and the spread of Freemasonry through Queensland in the wake of European settlement.

The place is important in demonstrating the principal characteristics of a particular class of cultural places.

The Mt Perry hall is important as a characteristic and intact example of a regional timber Masonic Hall, a category of building prominent in the streetscape and important in the social life of many country towns.

The place is important because of its aesthetic significance.

The building exhibits aesthetic qualities valued by the community, in particular, it contributes to the streetscape and is an illustration of the prosperity of Mt Perry in the late nineteenth and early twentieth centuries.

The place has a special association with the life or work of a particular person, group or organisation of importance in Queensland's history.

The Masonic Hall, Mt Perry, has a special association with those Freemasons living in and around Mt Perry and with the Freemasonry movement in Queensland.
