= Wonbah, Queensland =

Wonbah
- Suburb
- Interactive map of Wonbah
- Coordinates: 25.0691°S 151.6116°E
- Country: Australia
- State: Queensland
- LGA: Bundaberg Region
- Location: 12.3 km (7.6 mi) N of Mount Perry; 40 km (25 mi) WSW of Gin Gin; 89.1 km (55.4 mi) WSW of Bundaberg; 404 km (251 mi) NNW of Brisbane

Government
  - State electorate: Callide
  - Federal division: Flynn

Area
  - Total: 69.6 km^{2} (26.9 sq mi)

Population
  - Total: 78 (2021 census)
  - Density: 1.121/km^{2} (2.903/sq mi)
- Time zone: UTC+10:00 (AEST)
- Postcode: 4671
Suburbs around Wonbah
Yarrol	Wonbah Forest	Wonbah Forest
Yarrol	Wonbah	Boolboonda
Mount Perry	Mount Perry	Mount Perry

Wonbah is a rural locality in the Bundaberg Region, Queensland, Australia. In the 2021 census, Wonbah had a population of 78 people.

== Geography ==
Wonbah Knob is in the east of the locality (25.0719°S 151.6651°E), rising to 338 metres (1,109 ft) above sea level.

The land use is predominantly grazing on native vegetation with some crop growing.

== History ==
In 1887, 16,500 acres (6,700 ha) of land were resumed from the Wonbah pastoral run. The land was offered for selection for the establishment of small farms on 17 April 1887.

== Demographics ==
In the 2016 census, Wonbah had a population of 98 people.

In the 2021 census, Wonbah had a population of 78 people.

== Education ==
There are no schools in Wonbah. The nearest government primary school is Mount Perry State School in neighbouring Mount Perry to the south. The nearest government secondary school is Gin Gin State High School in Gin Gin to the north-east; however, it may be too distant for students living in the west of Wonbah with the alternatives being distance education and boarding school.
