= Moolboolaman =

- Suburb
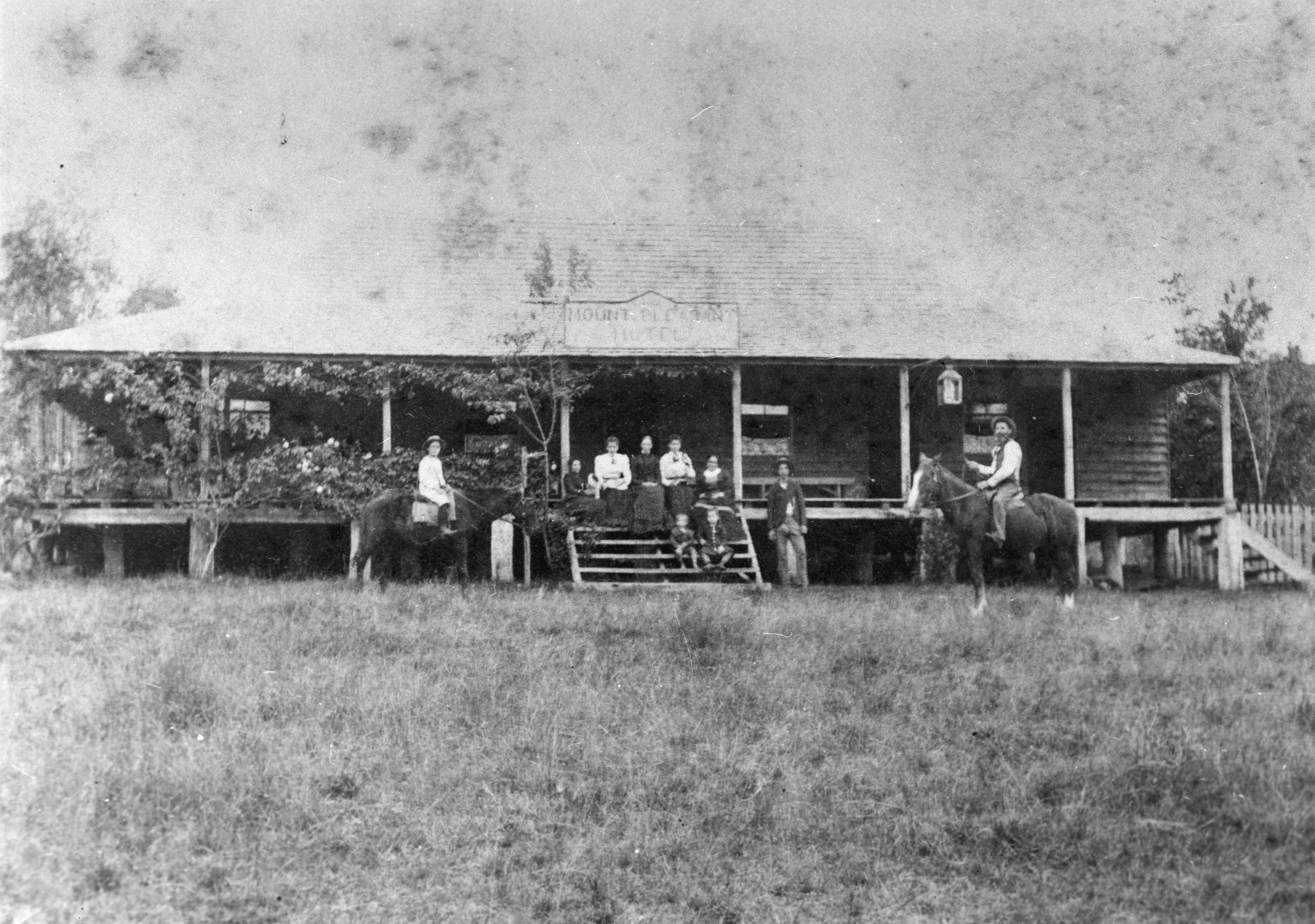
- Mount Pleasant Hotel, Moolboolaman, circa 1892

- Interactive map of Moolboolaman
- Coordinates: 24.9863°S 151.8205°E
- Country: Australia
- State: Queensland
- LGA: Bundaberg Region
- Location: 13.2 km (8.2 mi) W of Gin Gin; 62.4 km (38.8 mi) WSW of Bundaberg CBD; 127 km (79 mi) NW of Hervey Bay; 386 km (240 mi) NNW of Brisbane

Government
  - State electorate: Callide
  - Federal division: Flynn

Area
  - Total: 126.0 km^{2} (48.6 sq mi)

Population
  - Total: 487 (2021 census)
  - Density: 3.865/km^{2} (10.011/sq mi)
- Time zone: UTC+10:00 (AEST)
- Postcode: 4671
Suburbs around Moolboolaman
Takilberan	Monduran	Gin Gin
New Moonta	Moolboolaman	Tirroan; Dalysford
New Moonta	Nearum	Horse Camp

Moolboolaman is a rural locality in the Bundaberg Region, Queensland, Australia. In the 2021 census, Moolboolaman had a population of 487 people.

== Geography ==
Gin Gin–Mount Perry–Monto Road runs through from east to south-west.

== History ==
The locality takes its name from the parish, which is presumed to take its name from the pastoral run, which in turn is an Aboriginal word, meaning dead European man.

The first 65 kilometre section of the Mount Perry railway line from North Bundaberg railway station (originally called Bundaberg station) to Moolboolaman railway station was opened on 19 July 1881.

In 1887, 32,000 acres (13,000 ha) of land were resumed from the Moolboolaman pastoral run. The land was offered for selection for the establishment of small farms on 17 April 1887.

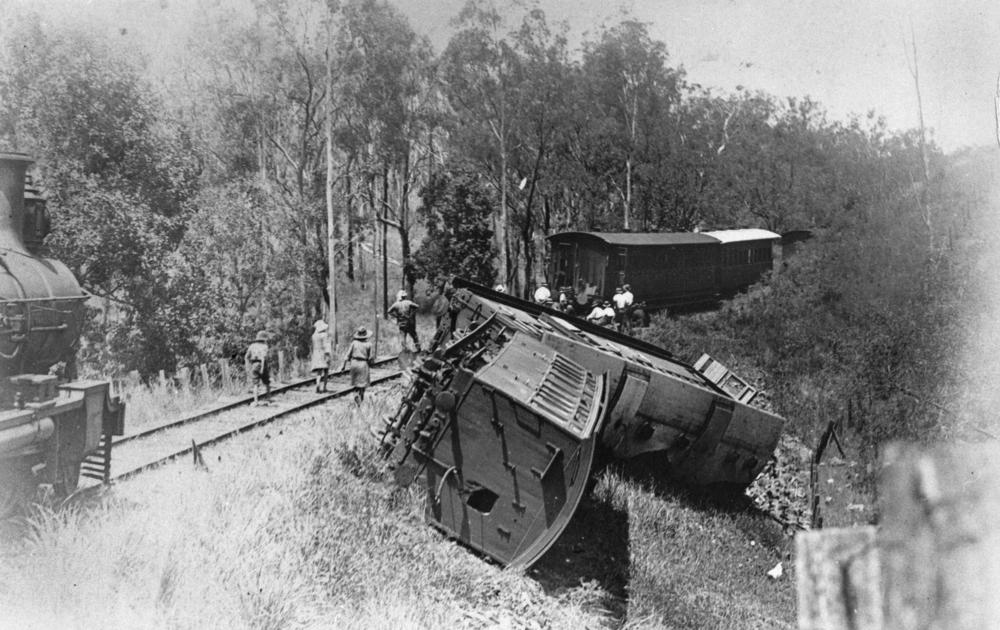
Railway carriages derailed at Gillen Siding on the Mount Perry branch line, 1924

Moolboolaman Provisional School opened circa 1892 and closed in 1902 due to low student numbers. It reopened in 1908 and on 1 January 1909 became Mooolboolaman State School.There was a temporary closure in 1910 and again in 1929–1930. In 1957, the school closed permanently. It was located immediately north of the Moolboolaman railway station on the Gin Gin Mount Perry Road (25.0065°S 151.8089°E).

Dalysford Provisional opened circa 1892. On 1 January 1909, it became Dalysford State School. It closed temporarily between late 1924 to circa April 1925 due to low student numbers. It closed permanently in 1927. It was located to the south-west of Dalysford railway station, off the Dalysford Road (approx 25.0214°S 151.8734°E). Historically in Dalysford, it is now within the boundaries of present-day Moolboolaman.

On Sunday 17 February 1924, a train was derailed at Gillen's Siding on the Mount Perry railway line (approx 25.01367°S 151.76801°E). Two people were killed with many others injured.

== Demographics ==
In the 2016 census, Moolboolaman had a population of 434 people.

In the 2021 census, Moolboolaman had a population of 487 people.

== Education ==
There are no schools in Moolboolaman. The nearest government primary schools are Gin Gin State School in neighbouring Gin Gin to the north-east and Mount Perry State School in Mount Perry to the south-west. The nearest government secondary school is Gin Gin State High School in Gin Gin.
