= Mount Perry railway line =

Railway line in Australia

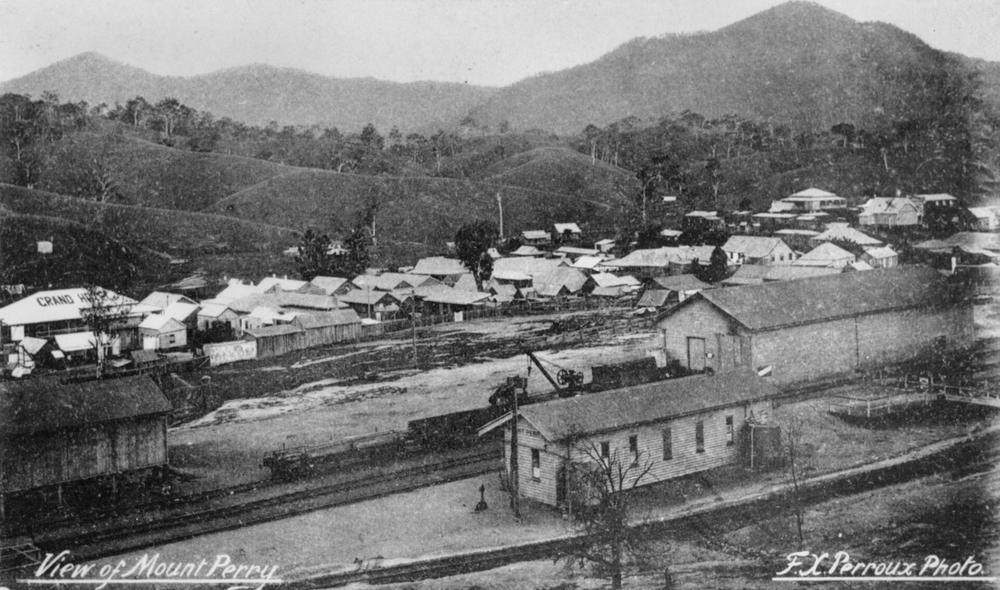
Mount Perry railway station and town in 1907

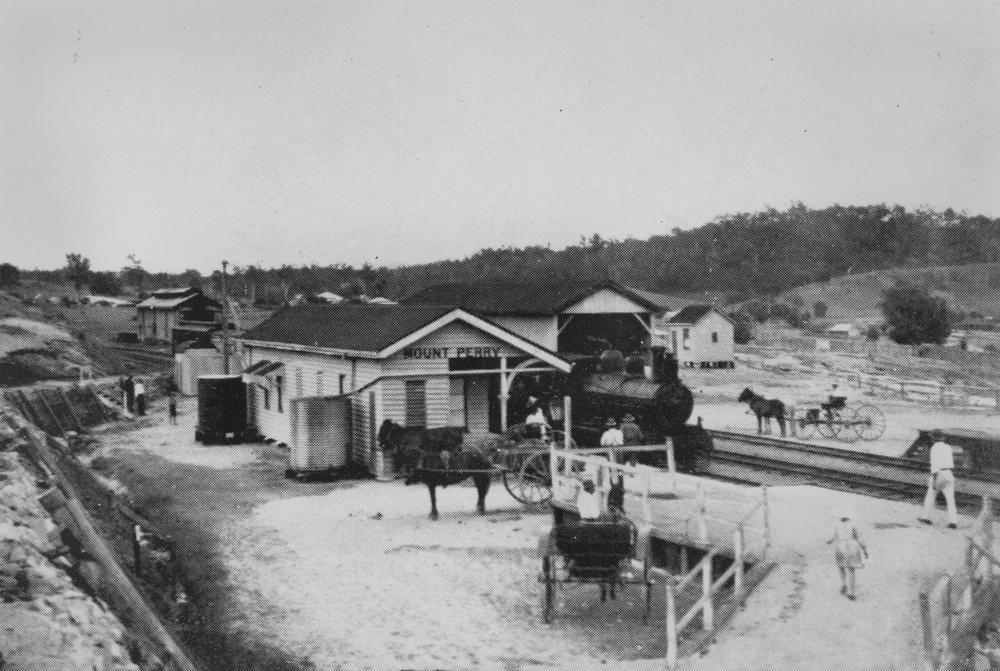
A photo of Mt Perry station, published in 1925, that appears to be from ~1910

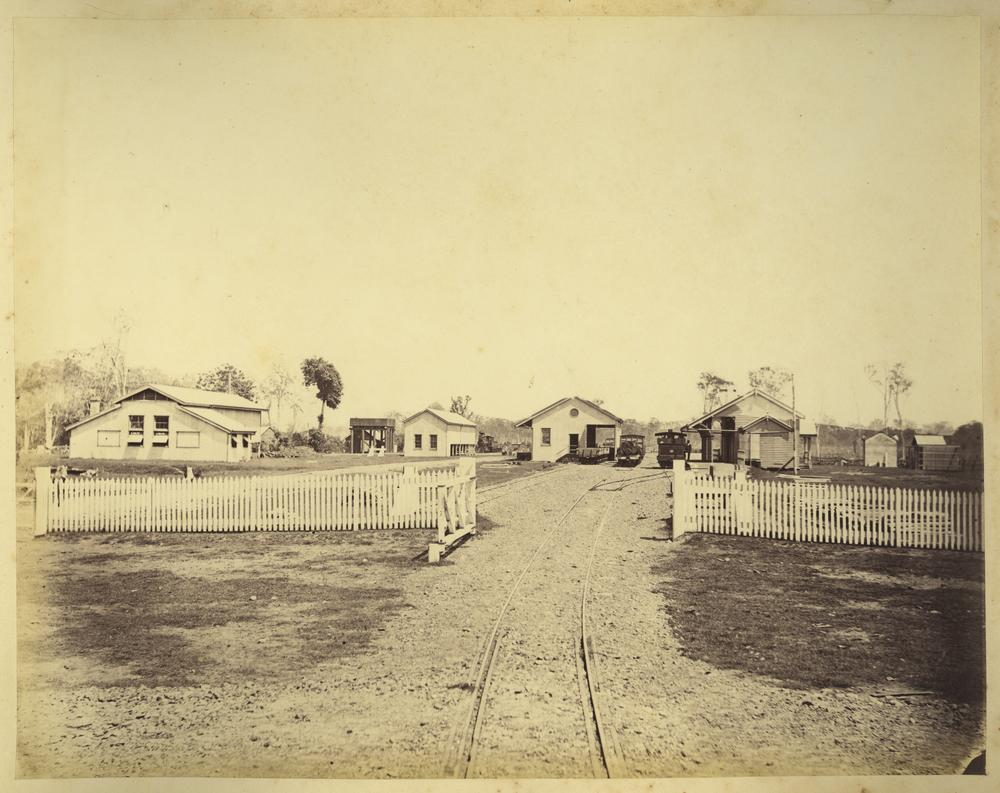
Bundaberg Station in 1882

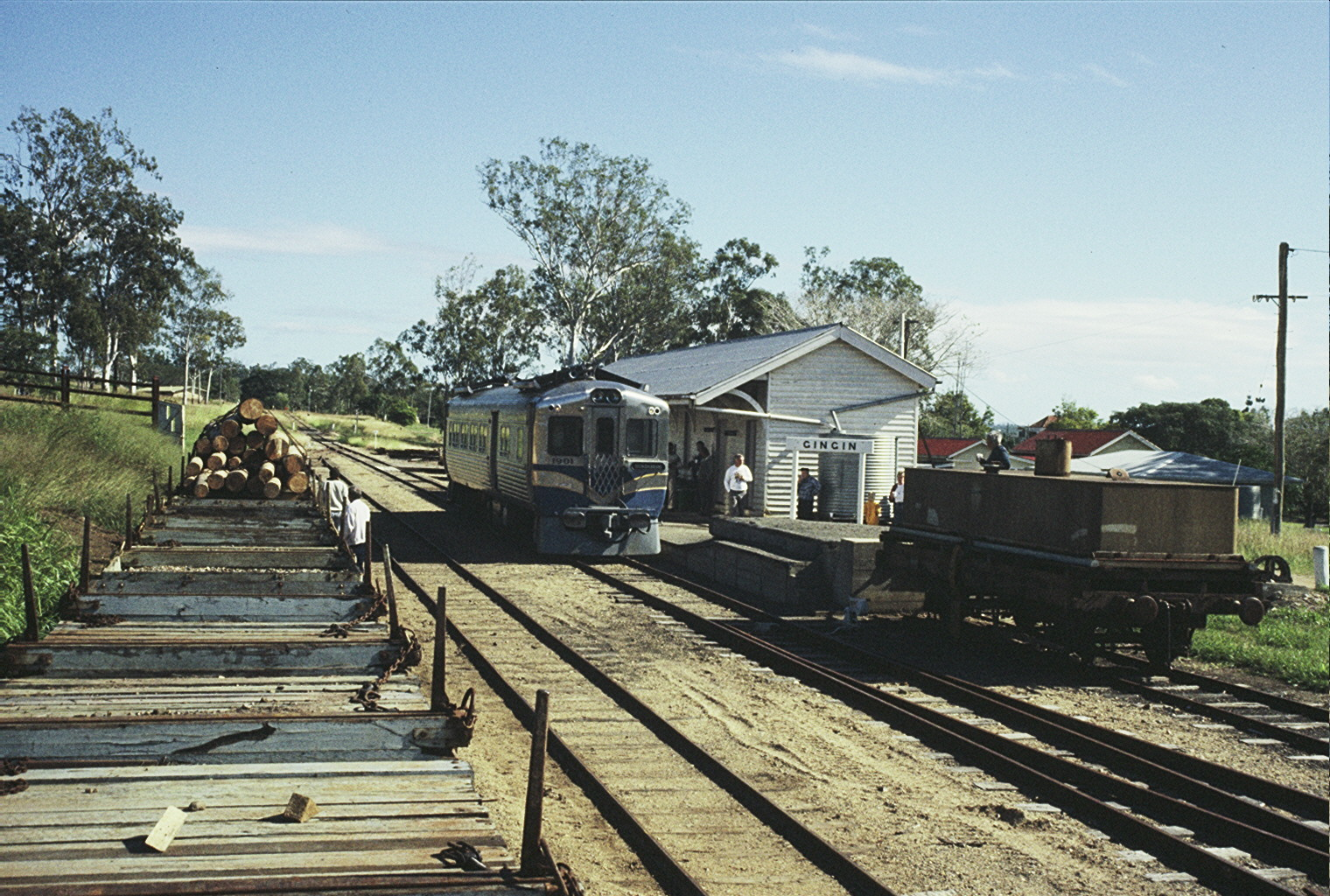
Rail Motor 1901 at Gin Gin Station, ~1989

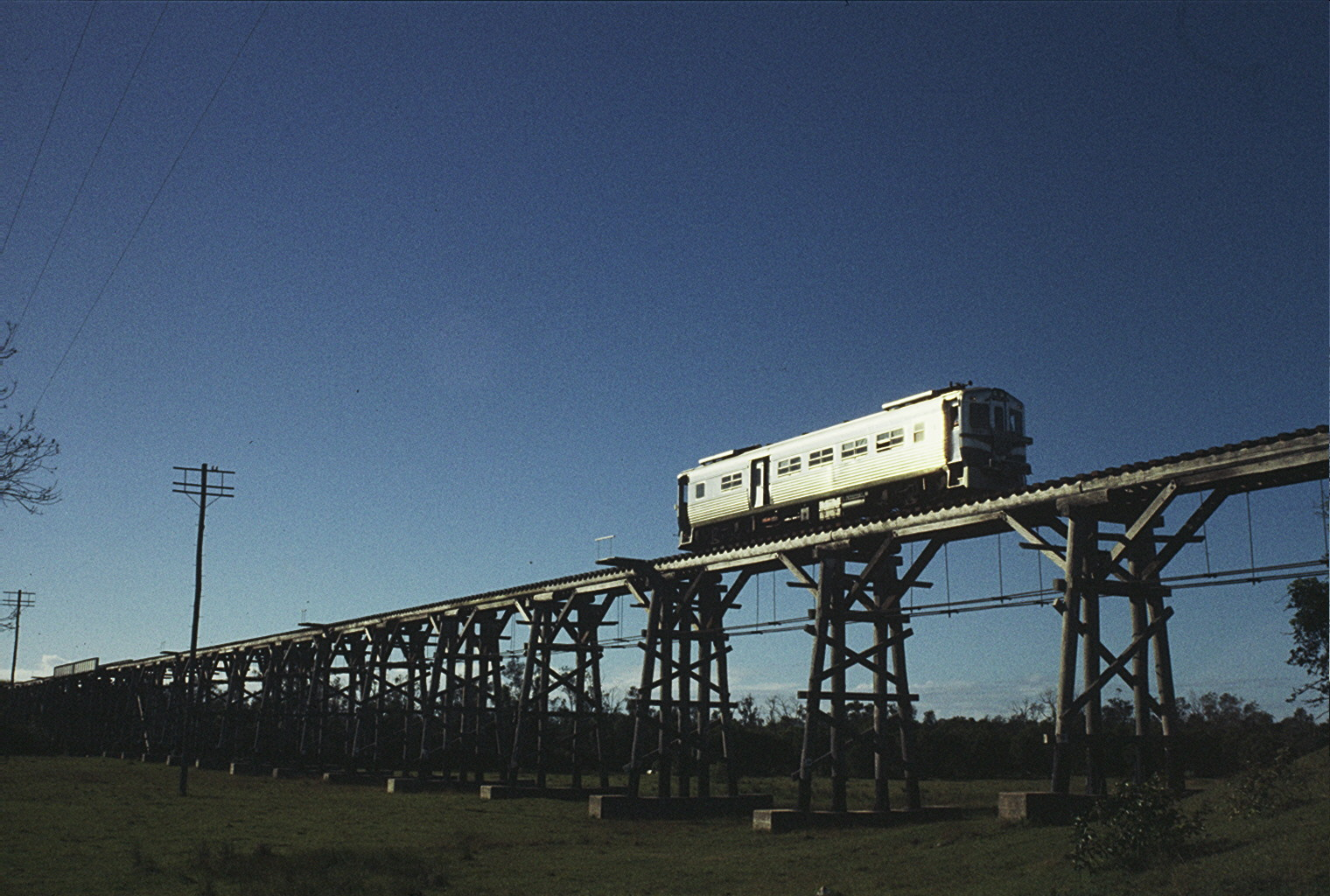
RM 1901 crossing the Splitters Creek bridge ~1989

The Mount Perry Branch Railway is a closed railway line in Central Queensland, Australia. In 1869 copper was discovered at Mount Perry (approx 100 km west of Bundaberg) and the township grew rapidly. A railway to the coast was essential to provide cheap transport and make the mining of low percentage ore viable. Maryborough and Bundaberg vied for the opportunity to be the terminus and the latter city was successful.

== Survey ==
A survey dated 20 March 1875 proposed a line from North Bundaberg, thus avoiding an expensive bridge over the Burnett River, west to Gin Gin and then via the old road and telegraph route to Moolboolaman but still some distance short of Mount Perry. There were delays in gaining official approval for the line to the extent that, when Queensland Parliament finally approved construction, mining at Mount Perry was substantially curtailed.

== Opening ==
The first 65 kilometre section from North Bundaberg railway station (originally called Bundaberg station) to Moolboolaman opened on 19 July 1881. The stops were at Oakwood, Sharon, Manoo, Bingera, Birthamba, Koolboo, Goondoon, Hilo, Bullyard, Tagon, Maroondan, Uping, McIlwraith, Gin Gin, Tookie, Watawa, Tirroan, Guragila and Dalysford. Construction of the first stage predated the completion of the North Coast line from Maryborough to Bundaberg by some seven years and it was only then that Bundaberg station was renamed North Bundaberg.

== Extensions ==
There followed extensions to Gillen’s Siding opened on 15 August 1882, then via Goyan and Ellimatta to Boolboonda opened on 12 November 1883, and lastly via Wonbah, Wolca and Drummer’s Creek to Mount Perry opened on 20 May 1884. A feature of the last stage of the line was construction of the Boolboonda Tunnel. Excavated a distance of 192 metres through solid rock, the tunnel is the longest unsupported tunnel in the southern hemisphere. Completion of the final stage meant that a service leaving Mount Perry at 7.30am took 4 ½ hours to reach Bundaberg before departing at 3.00 pm for the return journey.

== Locomotives ==
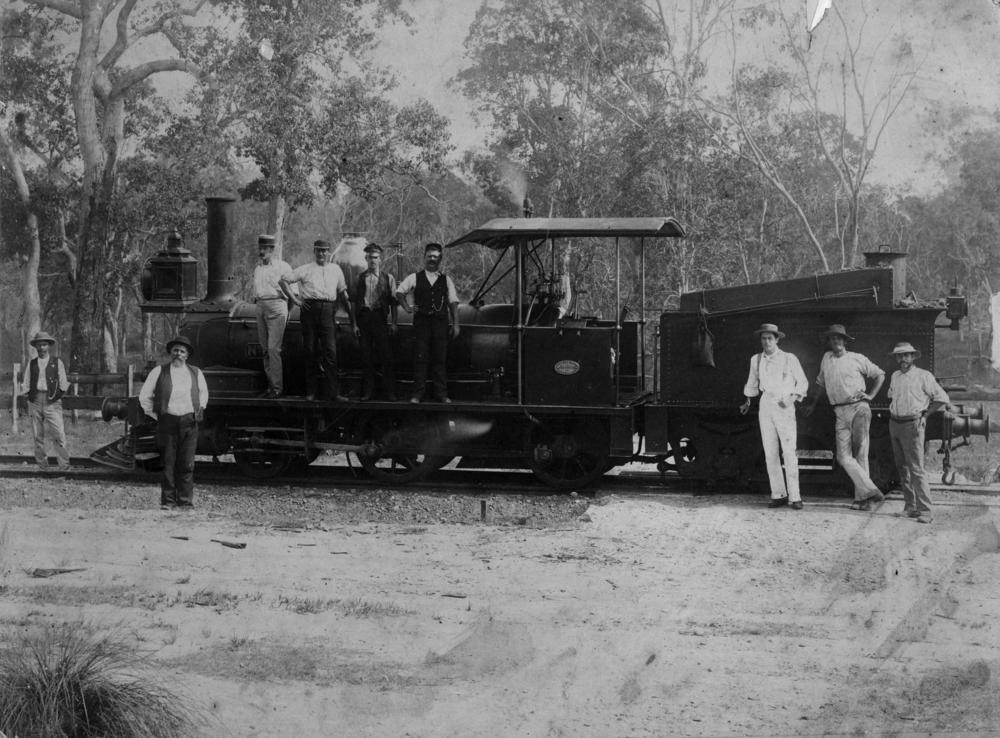
For information, see text

Information about locomotives is sketchy. The locomotive pictured on the right was apparently used from 1881 to 1890. The description of the photo reads:

"Steam locomotive with a group of men gathered around it, ca. 1880 This locomotive has a plate on the side of the cabin with the words 'Railway Works Ipswich Queensland 1877' inscribed. The locomotive was built at Ipswich Railway Workshops in 1877. It was known as an A10 class steam locomotive (or an Ipswich A10). It ran on the southern and western railway, as Locomotive 36, until 1881 when it operated on the Bundaberg Railway. In 1890 it was sold to contractors building part of the Bundaberg - Gladstone railway and in 1892 sold again to Young Brothers of Fairymead Mill, Bundaberg. It was used initially on trains at Avonside, then at the mill at North Bundaberg. Its boiler exploded at Avondale in the early 1890s. In 1935 it was replaced by a locomotive purchased from Mount Lyall in Tasmania but its remains were not disposed of until 1951."

== Traffic ==
Two trains a week operated after the Moolboolaman opening but a rapid rise in timber transport necessitated three trains a week in 1883 and daily services in 1884. Sugar cane traffic increased quickly when a mill was opened at Bingera in 1885. Although mining activities dwindled, timber transport took over to some degree until copper mining again became viable in the early 1900s. Until then, the line ran at a loss but high copper prices saw large scale mining return to Mount Perry and provide the railway and town with a new lease of life.

== Accident ==
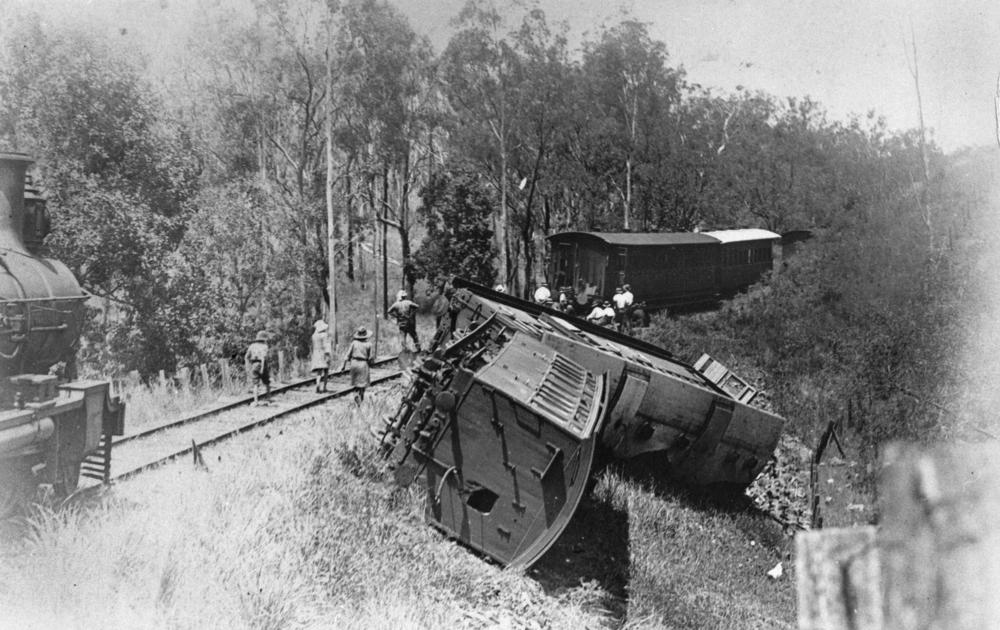
Railway carriages derailed at Gillen Siding on the Mount Perry branch line, 1924

A fatal accident resulted after a derailment near Gillen’s Siding early on Sunday 17 February 1924. The train was on a holiday excursion from Mount Perry to Bargara. Two people died in the incident which was deemed to have been caused by excessive speed and negligence by the driver and guard.

== Closure ==
Transportation of timber, sugar and dairy products continued until it became uneconomical for the service to continue. The line closed in stages – from Mount Perry to Tirroan (just west of Gin Gin) on 31 October 1960, from Tirroan to Gin Gin in 1988, Gin Gin station on 17 January 1992 and the line to North Bundaberg on 16 January 1993.

== Heritage listings ==
The Mount Perry railway line has a number of heritage-listed sites, including:

- Boolboonda Tunnel
- North Bundaberg railway station. About 1994, North Bundaberg station building was relocated some 500 metres west to the opposite side of the track and is now part of the Bundaberg Railway Museum.
- Splitters Creek Railway Bridge. Although avoiding a bridge over the Burnett River, the route could not avoid a crossing of Splitters Creek, a Burnett tributary located a short distance to the west. This imposing heritage listed structure towers high over the creek and features steel rods which link the trestles to provide extra strength.

== Industrial railways ==
Industrial railways (tramways) transported goods, such as sugar cane, from the production area to the main line. Some of the industrial locomotives have been preserved at the Botanical Gardens Railway, Bundaberg.

== See also ==
- Construction of Queensland railways
