= Mount Perry, Queensland =

Mount Perry
- Town
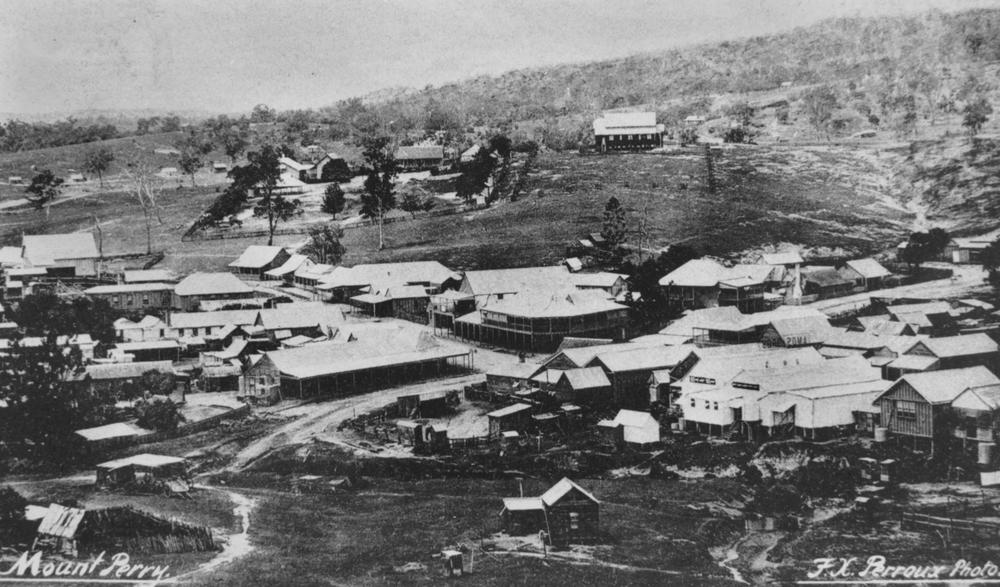
- View of Mount Perry, 1907

- Interactive map of Mount Perry
- Coordinates: 25.1802°S 151.6458°E
- Country: Australia
- State: Queensland
- LGA: North Burnett Region
- Location: 52.2 km (32.4 mi) SE of Gin Gin; 65.9 km (40.9 mi) N of Gayndah; 101 km (63 mi) WSW of Bundaberg; 365 km (227 mi) NNW of Brisbane

Government
  - State electorate: Callide
  - Federal division: Flynn

Area
  - Total: 608.7 km^{2} (235.0 sq mi)

Population
  - Total: 487 (2021 census)
  - Density: 0.8001/km^{2} (2.0722/sq mi)
- Time zone: UTC+10:00 (AEST)
- Postcode: 4671
Localities around Mount Perry
Yarrol	Wonbah; Boolboonda	New Moonta; Nearum
Mungy	Mount Perry	Doughboy; Good Night
Mungy	Yenda	Mingo

Mount Perry is a rural town and locality in the North Burnett Region, Queensland, Australia. In the 2021 census, the locality of Mount Perry had a population of 487 people.

The neighbourhood of Drummers Creek is in the locality (25.1500°S 151.6500°E).

== Geography ==
The Perry Fault, a major regional strike-slip structure in South East Queensland is in the New England Orogenic Belt.

Mount Perry is about 365 kilometres (227 mi) northwest of Brisbane, the capital of Queensland, and about 100 kilometres (62 mi) west of Bundaberg. The town is nestled in a valley near Mount Perry, the area's highest mountain. The Normanby Lookout is located on Normanby Range Road off Towns Creek Road from the Gin Gin-Mount Perry Road and offers views of the Mount Perry Township and the surrounding countryside. Schuh’s Lookout is on Schuhs Lookout Road off the Monto-Mount Perry Road at the top of the range, offering views south of Mount Perry.

== History ==
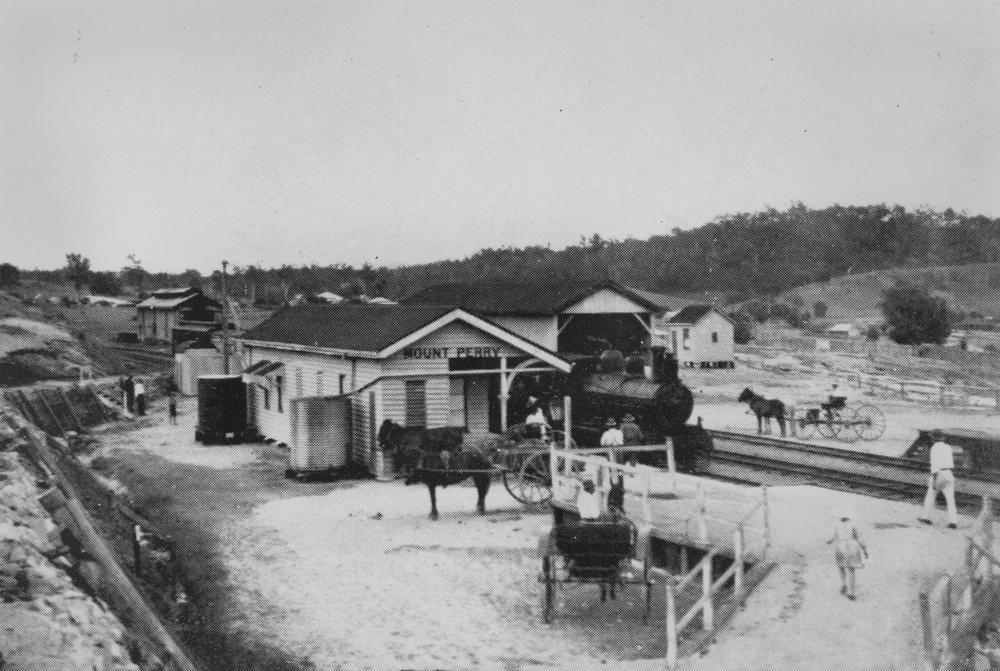
Mount Perry railway station, 1925

Gureng Gureng (also known as Gooreng Gooreng, Goreng Goreng, Goeng, Gurang, Goorang Goorang, Korenggoreng) is an Australian Aboriginal language spoken by the Gureng Gureng people. The Gooreng Gooreng language region includes the towns of Bundaberg, Gin Gin and Miriam Vale extending south towards Childers, inland to Monto and Mt Perry.

The locality takes its name from Mount Perry pastoral run which was named in 1857. Originally there were two private towns known as Fife-Barnett and the town of Tenningering. Tenningering was renamed Mount Perry on 14 January 1915.

In 1869, copper was discovered at Mount Perry (approx 100 km west of Bundaberg) and the township grew rapidly. A railway to the coast was essential to provide cheap transport and make the mining of low percentage ore viable. Maryborough and Bundaberg vied for the opportunity to be the terminus and the latter city was successful. The first 65 kilometres (40 mi) section of the Mount Perry railway line from North Bundaberg railway station (originally called Bundaberg station) to Moolboolaman opened on 19 July 1881.

Mount Perry Provisional School opened on 7 October 1871 in a "crude bark humpy" with 36 students under teacher Archibald Douglas of Gayndah. It became Mount Perry State School on 9 February 1874. In the early 1900s, the school had several hundred students. On Saturday 1 April 1922, the teacher's residence was burned down, but a bucket brigade was able to save the school building. In September 1954, a new school building opened on the school's current site.

Mount Perry Post Office opened on 26 July 1871. It was known as Tenningering between 1882 and 1884.

Mount Perry Wesleyan Methodist Church opened on Sunday 21 July 1872. It was built from timber at a cost of £220. It could seat 120 people. In 1919, it was relocated to become the Methodist Church in Woowoonga. In 1939, it was relocated to Biggenden to be used as the Methodist church hall.

St Patrick's Catholic Church was built in 1873. A Catholic day school opened at the church under teacher Miss Bertheau. A second St Patrick's Church was built in 1904 from timber on the site of the earlier church, which had sold for removal. The architect was F H Faircloth and the builder was John Guthrie. Although the church was to be opened on Sunday 12 February 1905 by Archbishop Robert Dunne, he was unable to attend on the day and the church was officially opened by the local priest Father Mimnagh with over 400 people in attendance.

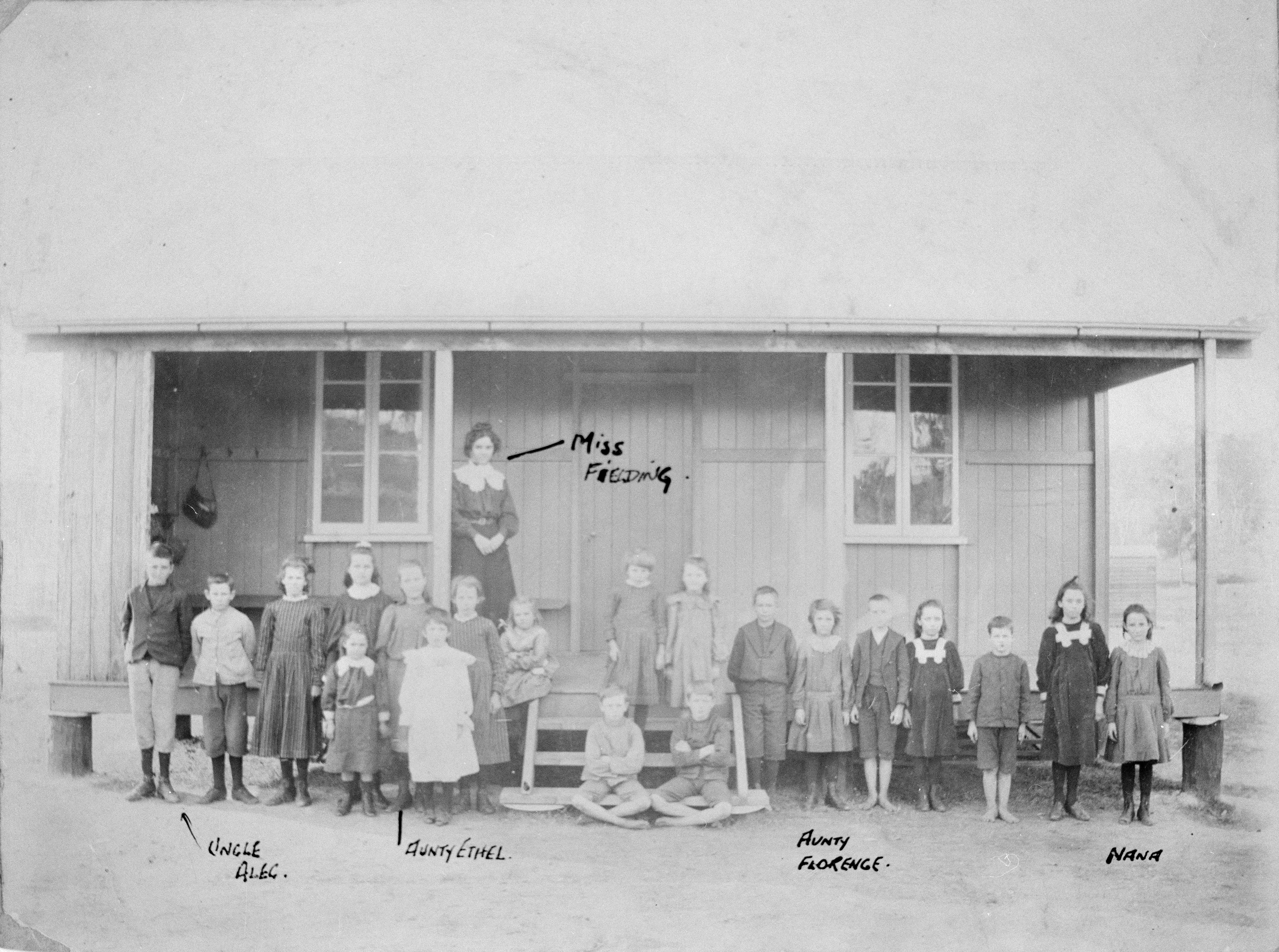
Schoolchildren and teacher outside the school at Drummers Creek, 1908

Drummer's Creek Provisional School opened on 5 April 1880. On 1 January 1909, it became Drummer's Creek State School. It closed in 1959. It was at 1 School Lane (25.1404°S 151.6253°E).

Mount Perry was connected by the Mount Perry railway line to Bundaberg from 1884 until 1960.

St Anne's Anglican Church was built in 1903. It could seat 100 people.

Mount Perry Presbyterian Church was opened on Wednesday 17 June 1908 by the Reverend Andrew Gillison. It has closed. It was at 11 Isabella Street (25.177508°S 151.6439°E). As at April 2021, the church building was still extant and signed as the "Hilltop Chapel".

The Salvation Army hall opened on Saturday 8 August 1908.

Harpur's Hill Provisional School opened in 1908 and closed circa 1909. It reopened in 1917, becoming Harpur's Hill State School. In 1919, it had 11 students under teacher Miss E. Plumb. It closed permanently circa 1924. It was on a 2-acre (0.81 ha) site on the western side of Homestead Road (25.1382°S 151.5645°E) and served a mining community.

== Demographics ==
In the 2006 census, the locality of Mount Perry had a population of 431 people.

In the 2011 census, the locality of Mount Perry had a population of 480 people.

In the 2016 census, the locality of Mount Perry had a population of 538 people.

In the 2021 census, the locality of Mount Perry had a population of 487 people.

== Heritage listings ==
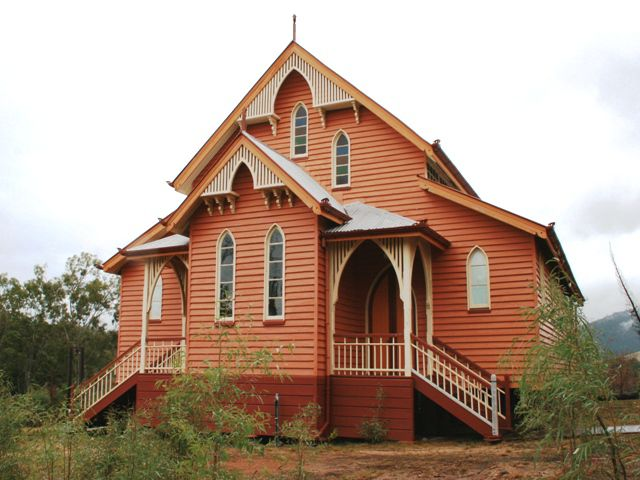
St Patrick's Church, 2009

Mount Perry has a number of heritage-listed sites, including:

- Mount Perry Copper Smelter, off Flora Street
- Mount Perry Cemetery, Heusman Street
- Mount Perry Masonic Lodge, Isabella Street
- Mount Perry Powder Magazine, Sandy Camp Road (north of Magazine Road)
- St Patricks Church, 18 Pearson Street

== Economy ==
Mount Perry is a rural farming area, primarily for raising cattle. Gold mining continues as an important industry. Evolution Mining owns and operates Mt Rawdon Mine which is a gold and silver mine with annual community tours.

== Education ==
Mount Perry State School is a government primary (Early Childhood-6) school for boys and girls at 24 Annie Street (25.1823°S 151.6431°E). In 2018, the school had an enrolment of 52 students with 7 teachers (5 full-time equivalent) and 10 non-teaching staff (4 full-time equivalent).

There are no secondary schools in Mount Perry. The nearest government secondary schools are Gin Gin State High School in Gin Gin to the north-east and Burnett State College in Gayndah to the south. However, some parts of Mount Perry are too distant to attend these schools; the alternatives are distance education and boarding school.

== Amenities ==
The North Burnett Regional Council operates a public library at 34 Heusman Street.

The Mount Perry branch of the Queensland Country Women's Association meets at 73 Heusman Street.

St Patrick's Catholic Church is at 18 Pearson Street (25.179999°S 151.642°E).

St Anne's Anglican Church is at 99 Heusman Street (25.177599°S 151.643°E).

There is a government-run health centre and a 9-hole golf course. There is a general store, petrol station and post office (with bank agency), motel and a hotel.

== Attractions ==
Mount Perry has historic copper workings.

Mount Perry has an art gallery and a bicentennial museum with active historic gold stamper (demonstrations on request).

An 18 kilometres (11 mi) section of the Bicentennial National Trail passes through the Mount Perry area and is ideal for walking, cycling or horse riding activities.

There are two lookouts in Mount Perry:

- Normanby Range Lookout at the end of Normanby Range Road (25.1684°S 151.6276°E)
- Schuh's Lookout on the Monto Mount Perry Road (25.1901°S 151.6251°E)

== Events ==
The Mount Perry Race Club runs horse racing events.

== Notable people ==
- Florence Broadhurst (1899 – 1977), Australian wallpaper and fabrics designer was born in Mount Perry
- Constance Keys, World War I nurse, was born in Mount Perry
- George Martens, Member of the Australia House of Representatives, was born in Mount Perry
- Harold George Nelson, Member of the Australian House of Representatives worked in Mount Perry

== See also ==
- Boolboonda Tunnel
