= North Bundaberg railway station =

Former railway station in Queensland, Australia

North Bundaberg

General information
- Location: 28 Station St, Bundaberg North, Bundaberg, Queensland, Australia
- Coordinates: 24°51′33″S 152°20′07″E
- Line: North Coast Line
- Connections: no connections

History
- Closed: Yes

Services
Preceding station	Queensland Rail	Following station
Bundaberg towards Brisbane	North Coast line	Moorland towards Cairns
Location

North Bundaberg railway station is a closed railway station at 28 Station Street, North Bundaberg, Bundaberg, Queensland, Australia. It is on the North Coast railway line and linked that line to the Mount Perry railway line.

The station was constructed in 1881, and it was to be used as the last stop of transporting raw materials such as copper from the mines to the coast for shipping. Very soon after the railway was completed, the production of the copper mines declined drastically. However, the line station still provided transport for sugar, timber, and other agricultural goods until portions of the Mt. Perry line began closing in 1960, completely closing the line in 1964.

== Museum ==
The railway station buildings are used by the Bundaberg Railway Museum though the station itself remains closed.

Although the museum is located a few hundred meters from the original location, most of the original station remains, including worker uniforms, tools, and a 1921 guard's van. Passenger services now only stop at Bundaberg railway station.
