= List of schools in Wide Bay–Burnett =

This is a list of schools in the Wide Bay–Burnett region of Queensland, Australia, centred on the cities of Hervey Bay, Maryborough and Bundaberg. It includes the local government areas of:

- Bundaberg Region
- Cherbourg Aboriginal Shire
- Fraser Coast Region
- Gympie Region
- North Burnett Region
- South Burnett Region

Prior to 2015, the Queensland education system consisted of primary schools, which accommodated students from Kindergarten to Year 7 (ages 5–13), and high schools, which accommodate students from Years 8 to 12 (ages 12–18). However, from 2015, Year 7 became the first year of high school.

== State schools ==
=== State primary schools ===
Name	Suburb	LGA	Opened	Coords	Notes
Abercorn State School	Abercorn	North Burnett	1927	25.1359°S 151.1270°E	At 957 Wuruma Dam Road.
Albert State School	Maryborough	Fraser Coast	1883	25.5467°S 152.7038°E	At 210–220 Albert Street.
Alloway State School	Alloway	Bundaberg	1886	24.9521°S 152.3782°E	Opened 1886 as Elliott State School, renamed 1960 Alloway State School. At 4334 Goodwood Road.
Amamoor State School	Amamoor	Gympie	1921	26.3464°S 152.6731°E	At 2 Elizabeth Street.
Avoca State School	Avoca	Bundaberg	1980	24.8836°S 152.3134°E	At 1 Twyford Street.
Avondale State School	Avondale	Bundaberg	1895	24.7358°S 152.1606°E	At 371 Avondale Road.
Bargara State School	Mon Repos	Bundaberg	1893	24.8221°S 152.4387°E	Sandhills Provisional School opened on 20 March 1893. On 1 January 1909 it became Sandhills State School. In January 1921 it was renamed Bargara State School. Despite the name, Bargara State School is at 591 Bargara Road in Mon Repos.
Bauple State School	Bauple	Fraser Coast	1901	25.8121°S 152.6228°E	Opened as Raby State School in 1901 and renamed Bauple State School in 1935. At 44 Forestry Road.
Benarkin State School	Benarkin	South Burnett	1910	26.8844°S 152.1417°E	At Scott Street.
Biggenden State School	Biggenden	North Burnett	1892	25.5107°S 152.0474°E	Prep to Year 10. At 3–9 Frederick Street.
Binjour Plateau State School	Binjour	North Burnett	1913	25.5158°S 151.4565°E	At 18401 Burnett Highway
Blackbutt State School	Blackbutt South	South Burnett	1896–1913	26.9011°S 152.0994°E	Blackbutt Provisional School opened on 20 January 1896 under teacher Rosa Bella Ryan. On 1 January 1909, it became Blackbutt State School. The school was on a 6-acre-1-rood (2.5 ha) site at 97 Blackbutt Crows Nest Road in present-day Blackbutt South (south-east corner of Haynes Kite Millar Road).
Blackbutt State School	Blackbutt	South Burnett	1914-	26.8905°S 152.1039°E	In January 1914, the school relocated its current larger site on Crofton Street (bounded by Sutton Street, Margaret Street and Pine Street) in Blackbutt.
Booyal Central State School	Booyal	Bundaberg	1916	25.2094°S 152.0324°E	At 31620 Bruce Highway.
Boynewood State School	Boynewood	North Burnett	1915–1934	approx 25.64670°S 151.23639°E	Boynewood State School opened on 2 February 1915 on the northern corner of Dykehead Road and Taylors Road.
Boynewood State School	Boynewood	North Burnett	1934–	25.6549°S 151.2548°E	In 1934, the school was relocated to 1138 Durong Road to be more centrally located.
Branyan Road State School	Branyan	Bundaberg	1905	24.8927°S 152.2938°E	At 430 Branyan Drive. Listed on the Queensland Heritage Register.
Brooweena State School	Brooweena	Fraser Coast	1904	25.5989°S 152.2610°E	In Lahey Street.
Bullyard State School	Bullyard	Bundaberg	1901	24.9500°S 152.0612°E	At 2358 Bucca Road.
Bundaberg Central State School	Bundaberg Central	Bundaberg	1875		On Bourbong Street. Originally known as Bundaberg South State School, it was established in January 1875 on a site in Bourbong Street. In 1885, it was split into Bundaberg South Girls and Infants State School and Bundaberg South Boys State School. The two schools were relocated to Crofton Street in July 1890.
Bundaberg Central State School	Bundaberg Central	Bundaberg	1890	24.8698°S 152.3482°E	At 13 Crofton Street. About November 1894, the two schools were renamed Bundaberg Central Girls and Infants State School and Bundaberg Central Boys State School. At the start of 1926, the two schools were amalgamated as Bundaberg Central State School.
Bundaberg East State School	Bundaberg East	Bundaberg	1886	24.8622°S 152.3725°E	At 33 Scotland Street.
Bundaberg North State School	Bundaberg North	Bundaberg	1875	24.8518°S 152.3404°E	Bundaberg North Provisional School opened on 26 January 1874. On 27 September 1875, it became Bundaberg North State School.
Bundaberg South State School	Bundaberg South	Bundaberg	1891	24.8710°S 152.3606°E	At 32 Walla Street. On 11 May 1891, the South-East Bundaberg State School opened under head teacher William Ernest Benbow. In 1894, the school was renamed Bundaberg South State School. Not to be confused with Bundaberg Central State School which was originally called Bundaberg South State School between 1875 and 1894.
Bundaberg West State School	Bundaberg West	Bundaberg	1926	24.8762°S 152.3338°E	At 185 George Street.
Burnett Heads State School	Burnett Heads	Bundaberg	1878	24.7717°S 152.4145°E	At 52 Burnett Heads Road.
Chatsworth State School	Chatsworth	Gympie	1900	26.1428°S 152.6154°E	At 15 Rammutt Road.
Cherbourg State School	Cherbourg	Cherbourg	1903	26.2929°S 151.9551°E	At 15 Fisher Street.
Childers State School	Childers	Bundaberg	1889	25.2311°S 152.2803°E	Early Childhood to Year 6. At Mungomery Street.
Cloyna State School	Cloyna	South Burnett	1911	26.1073°S 151.8461°E	At 8 William Webber Road.
Coalstoun Lakes State School	Coalstoun Lakes	North Burnett	1910	25.6121°S 151.8901°E	At 3 Main Street.
Coolabunia State School	Coolabunia	South Burnett	1891	26.5893°S 151.9026°E	At 2–26 Gipps Street.
Cordalba State School	Cordalba	Bundaberg	1894	25.1587°S 152.2121°E	At 3 John Street (corner of Cemetery Road).
Crawford State School	Kingaroy	South Burnett	1902–1911	26.51351°S 151.79944°E	Originally opened as Logboy Provisional School, later Logboy State School. At 289 Weens Road, Kingaroy.
Crawford State School	Crawford	South Burnett	1911	26.4975°S 151.8225°E	In 1911, renamed Crawford State School and relocated to current location at 215–227 Siefert Street.
Dagun State School	Dagun	Gympie	1924	26.3220°S 152.6769°E	At 39 Dagun Road.
Dallarnil State School	Dallarnil	North Burnett	1901	25.3839°S 152.0456°E	At 3 Main Street.
Durong South State School	Durong	South Burnett	1925	26.39233°S 151.24433°E	At 10463 Mundubbera Durong Road.
Elliott Heads State School	Elliott Heads	Bundaberg	1912	24.9072°S 152.4756°E	At 143 Breusch Road.
Gayndah State School	Gayndah	North Burnett	1863	25.6238°S 151.6059°E	At 33 Meson Street.
Gin Gin State School	Gin Gin	Bundaberg	1882	24.9924°S 151.9551°E	At 13 May Street.
Givelda State School	Givelda	Bundaberg	1896	24.9875°S 152.1492°E	At 754 Pine Creek Road.
Glenwood State School	Glenwood	Fraser Coast	1918	25.9496°S 152.6026°E	At 13 Glenwood School Road.
Gooburrum State School	Gooburrum	Bundaberg	1884	24.8227°S 152.3059°E	At 14 Gooburrum Road.
Goodwood State School	Goodwood	Bundaberg	1900	25.1455°S 152.3845°E	At 1802 Goodwood Road.
Goomeri State School	Goomeri	Gympie	1912	26.1796°S 152.0648°E	P–10. At 5 Munro Street.
Granville State School	Granville	Fraser Coast	1875	25.5385°S 152.7154°E	Maryborough East State School opened on 24 May 1875. In 1938, it was renamed Granville State School. On Cambridge Street.
Gunalda State School	Gunalda	Gympie	1881	25.9927°S 152.5604°E	On King Street.
Gundiah State School	Gundiah	Fraser Coast	1886	25.8424°S 152.5464°E	At 23 Gundiah School Road.
Gympie Central State School	Gympie	Gympie	1869	26.1886°S 152.6646°E	Split-sex until 1943. At 14–20 Lawrence Street.
Gympie East State School	Greens Creek	Gympie	1965	26.1798°S 152.7327°E	Gympie East State School replaced four small schools: Beenam Range State School, Cedar Pocket State School, Cootharaba Road State School, and Neusa Vale State School.
Gympie South State School	Southside	Gympie	1910	26.1998°S 152.6454°E	At 50 Exhibition Road.
Gympie West State School	Gympie	Gympie	1958	26.1738°S 152.6621°E	At 41 Cartwright Road.
Howard State School	Howard	Fraser Coast	1884	25.3219°S 152.5578°E	At 108 William Street.
Jones Hill State School	Jones Hill	Gympie	1902	26.2291°S 152.6676°E	At 21 McIntosh Creek Road.
Kalkie State School	Kalkie	Bundaberg	1878	24.8464°S 152.3974°E	At 257 Bargara Road. Listed on the Queensland Heritage Register.
Kandanga State School	Kandanga	Gympie	1915	26.3874°S 152.6801°E	At 84 Main Street.
Kawungan State School	Kawungan	Fraser Coast	1991	25.2972°S 152.8496°E	Early Childhood to Year 6. On the eastern side of Grevillea Street.
Kia-Ora State School	Kia Ora	Gympie	1921	26.0284°S 152.7773°E	At 2754 Anderleigh Road.
Kilkivan State School	Kilkivan	Gympie	1876	26.0877°S 152.2413°E	P–10. At 6 Council Street. Was originally known as the Neureum Provisional School, becoming a State School in 1889 after the name had been changed to Kilkivan in 1881.
Kingaroy State School	Kingaroy	South Burnett	1902	26.5403°S 151.8331°E	Originally known as Mt. Jones Provisional School, it then became Kingaroy Provisional School in 1905 before becoming a full State School in 1909. At 61 Alford Street.
Kolan South State School	South Kolan	Bundaberg	1878	24.9340°S 152.1760°E	At 2297 Gin Gin Road.
Kumbia State School	Kumbia	South Burnett	1914	26.6932°S 151.6515°E	At 2–24 Bell Street.
Maroondan State School	Maroondan	Bundaberg	1927	24.9684°S 152.0143°E	At 31 Duke Stehbens Road.
Maryborough Central State School	Maryborough	Fraser Coast	1862	25.5354°S 152.6994°E	Split-sex until 1932. At 471 Kent Street.
Maryborough West State School	Maryborough	Fraser Coast	1886	25.5237°S 152.6945°E	At 149 North Street.
McIlwraith State School	McIlwraith	Bundaberg	1934	25.0085°S 151.9993°E	At 322 McIlwraith Road.
Moffatdale State School	Moffatdale	South Burnett	1915	26.3059°S 152.0117°E	Caulfield Provisional School opened on 1 November 1915 with 11 students under teacher Miss Elise Ellen Bow. In 1916, it was renamed Barambah West Provisional School and again in 1918 as Moffatdale Provisional School. On 1 June 1926, it became Moffatdale State School. At 892 Barambah Road.
Monkland State School	Monkland	Gympie	1884	26.2138°S 152.6859°E	At 220 Brisbane Road.
Monogorilby State School	Monogorilby	North Burnett	1936	26.0548°S 151.0084°E	At 2199 Monogorilby Road.
Monto State School	Monto	North Burnett	1926	24.8678°S 151.1182°E	At 3 Leichhardt Street.
Moore Park Beach State School	Moore Park	Bundaberg	2004	24.7096°S 152.2552°E	At 14 Murdochs Linking Road.
Mount Perry State School	Mount Perry	North Burnett	1871	25.1823°S 151.6431°E	At 24 Annie Street.
Mulgildie State School	Mulgildie	North Burnett	1927	24.9634°S 151.1340°E	At 4 Brigalow Street.
Mundubbera State College	Mundubbera	North Burnett	1913–1963		Mundubbera State School opened on 7 November 1913. The school was originally on land bordered by Stuart-Russell, Mahoney and Leichhardt Streets.
Mundubbera State College	Mundubbera	North Burnett	1963-	25.5854°S 151.2935°E	In 1963, a new site in Bunce Street was developed to offer secondary schooling to Year 10. New classrooms for primary schooling were added in Bunce Street in 1980. In 2022, it was renamed Mundubbera State College. Prep–10. At 57 Bunce Street.
Mungar State School	Mungar	Fraser Coast	1875	25.6041°S 152.5906°E	Originally known as Mary River Saw Mills Provisional School, name changed 1877. Located at 1143 Mungar Road.
Murgon State School	Murgon	South Burnett	1908	26.2397°S 151.9433°E	At 91 Gore Street. Listed on the Queensland Heritage Register.
Nanango State School	Nanango	South Burnett	1866	26.6716°S 152.0055°E	Early Childhood - Year 6. At 39 Drayton Street.
Norville State School	Norville	Bundaberg	1971	24.8865°S 152.3365°E	At Dr Mays Road.
Oakwood State School	Oakwood	Bundaberg	1924	24.8445°S 152.3004°E	At 125 Oakwood School Road.
One Mile State School	Gympie	Gympie	1869	26.1993°S 152.6753°E	At John Street.
Parke State School	Tinana South	Fraser Coast	1914	25.5882°S 152.6689°E	At 400 Teddington Road.
Pialba State School	Pialba	Fraser Coast	1884	25.2793°S 152.8333°E	At Alice Street.
Proston State School	Proston	South Burnett	1924	26.1677°S 151.6001°E	P–10, located at 94 Rodney Street. There was an earlier school distinct from this one, known as Proston Provisional School, refer to defunct State Schools list below.
Rainbow Beach State School	Rainbow Beach	Gympie	1986	25.9073°S 153.0787°E	At Warooga Road.
Sandy Strait State School	Urangan	Fraser Coast	1995	25.3004°S 152.8753°E	In Robert Street.
Sharon State School	Sharon	Bundaberg	1883	24.8724°S 152.2633°E	At 18 Sharon School Road.
St Helens State School	St Helens	Fraser Coast	1882	25.5027°S 152.7105°E	At 891 Saltwater Creek Road.
Sunbury State School	Maryborough	Fraser Coast	1891	25.5251°S 152.6778°E	At 545 Alice Street.
Taabinga State School	Taabinga	South Burnett	1897–1961		Taabinga Village Provisional School opened on 10 August 1897. On 1 January 1909, it became Taabinga Village State School. On 16 July 1961, Taabinga Village State School was closed and pupils transferred to the new Taabinga State School in Kingaroy.
Taabinga State School	Kingaroy	South Burnett	1961-	26.5563°S 151.8381°E	At Rae Street.
Tanduringie State School	Pimpimbudgee	South Burnett	1914–1934		Peron State School opened on 1 April 1914.
Tanduringie State School	Pimpimbudgee	South Burnett	1934–1938		In 1934, it was moved to the foot of the Maidenwell Range and was then known as Maidenwell State School. It closed on 18 March 1938.
Tanduringie State School	Pimpimbudgee	South Burnett	1939–1943		In 1939, it was relocated to 1 mile (1.6 km) south of the town of Maidenwell, reopening there on 26 March 1940, closed on 20 September 1942, and reopened on 23 August 1943.
Tanduringie State School	Pimpimbudgee	South Burnett	1949-	26.8916°S 151.7954°E	In 1949, the school was relocated to its current location in Pimpimbudgee and renamed Tanduringie State School. At 32 Tanduringie School Road
Thabeban State School	Thabeban	Bundaberg	1917	24.8983°S 152.3636°E	At 270 Goodwood Road.
Theebine State School	Theebine	Gympie	1889	25.9525°S 152.5409°E	Opened 1899 as Kilkivan Junction Provisional School, 1909 became Kilkivan Junction State School, 1910 renamed Theebine State School. In Scrub Road.
Tiaro State School	Tiaro	Fraser Coast	1870	25.7281°S 152.5811°E	At 1 Forgan Terrace.
Tin Can Bay State School	Tin Can Bay	Gympie	1934	25.9254°S 152.9950°E	Prep–10. At 2 Schnapper Creek Road. Opened as Wallu State School in 1934, but renamed Tin Can Bay State School in 1937.
Tinana State School	Tinana	Fraser Coast	1875	25.5586°S 152.6675°E	At 239 Gympie Road.
Tingoora State School	Tingoora	South Burnett	1908	26.3629°S 151.8195°E	6 Main Street.
Torbanlea State School	Torbanlea	Fraser Coast	1887	25.3479°S 152.5998°E	At Pialba Road.
Torquay State School	Torquay	Fraser Coast	1901	25.2877°S 152.8649°E	At Tavistock Street.
Two Mile State School	Two Mile	Gympie	1883	26.1707°S 152.6427°E	At 288 Bruce Highway North.
Urangan Point State School	Urangan	Fraser Coast	1916	25.2911°S 152.9020°E	In Miller Street.
Walkervale State School	Walkervale	Bundaberg	1955	24.8851°S 152.3596°E	Early Childhood - Year 6. At 46a Hurst Street.
Wallaville State School	Wallaville	Bundaberg	1909	25.0733°S 151.9971°E	At 7 Grey Street.
Wheatlands State School	Wheatlands	South Burnett	1913	26.2241°S 151.8459°E	422 Byee Road.
Widgee State School	Widgee	Gympie	1892	26.2038°S 152.4431°E	At 2156 Gympie-Woolooga Road.
Windera State School	Windera	South Burnett	1920	26.0528°S 151.8289°E	At 2588 Gayndah Murgon Road.
Winfield State School	Winfield	Bundaberg	1924	24.5457°S 152.0174°E	Early Childhood-6. At 1091 Winfield Road.
Wolvi State School	Wolvi	Gympie	1899	26.1492°S 152.8176°E	At 936 Kin Kin Road.
Wondai State School	Wondai	South Burnett	1905	26.3207°S 151.8821°E	P–9, at 32 Kent Street.
Woolooga State School	Woolooga	Gympie	1913	26.0483°S 152.3958°E	In Edwards Road.
Woongarra State School	Woongarra	Bundaberg	1879	24.8789°S 152.4056°E	At 468 Elliott Heads Road.
Wooroolin State School	Wooroolin	South Burnett	1901	26.4091°S 151.8120°E	At 34 Frederick Street.
Yandaran State School	Yandaran	Bundaberg	1919	24.7243°S 152.1121°E	At School Lane.
Yarrilee State School	Urraween	Fraser Coast	2000	25.2892°S 152.8046°E	At 15 Scrub Hill Road.

=== State high schools and colleges ===
Name	Suburb	LGA	Opened	Coordinates	Notes
Aldridge State High School	Maryborough	Fraser Coast	1973	25.5165°S 152.6885°E	47 Boys Avenue
Bundaberg State High School	Bundaberg Central	Bundaberg	1912	24.8770°S 152.3498°E	At 37 Maryborough Street. Listed on the Queensland Heritage Register
Bundaberg North State High School	Bundaberg North	Bundaberg	1974	24.8494°S 152.3396°E	At 9 Marks Street.
Burnett State College	Gayndah	North Burnett	1963	25.6318°S 151.6063°E	P–12; opened as Gayndah State High School, until it was renamed Burnett State College in 2006. At 65 Pineapple Street.
Eidsvold State School	Eidsvold	North Burnett	1889	25.3723°S 151.1212°E	Kindergarten–12. At 7 Hodgkinson Street.
Gin Gin State High School	Gin Gin	Bundaberg	1972	24.9906°S 151.9689°E	At 30 High School Road.
Gympie State High School	Gympie	Gympie	1912	26.1883°S 152.6781°E	At 2 Everson Road.
Hervey Bay State High School	Pialba	Fraser Coast	1964	25.2819°S 152.8322°E	At Beach Road.
Isis District State High School	Childers	Bundaberg	1961	25.2331°S 152.2739°E	At 3 Ridgway Street.
James Nash State High School	Gympie	Gympie	1977	26.1758°S 152.6560°E	At 109 Myall Street.
Kepnock State High School	Kepnock	Bundaberg	1964	24.8762°S 152.3772°E	At 43 Kepnock Road.
Kingaroy State High School	Kingaroy	South Burnett	1958	26.5429°S 151.8323°E	On Toomey Street.
Mary Valley State College	Imbil	Gympie	2002	26.4617°S 152.6792°E	Prep–10, formerly Imbil State School. At 15 Edward Street.
Maryborough State High School	Maryborough	Fraser Coast	1936	25.5344°S 152.6975°E	Established as two separate schools Maryborough State High and Intermediate School for Boys and Maryborough State High and Intermediate School for Girls. which were merged into Maryborough State High School in 1974. At 526 Kent Street.
Monto State High School	Monto	North Burnett	1964	24.8699°S 151.1185°E	On Mouatt Street.
Murgon State High School	Murgon	South Burnett	1959	26.2372°S 151.9446°E	P–12. At 2 Dutton Street.
Nanango State High School	Nanango	South Burnett	1982	26.6678°S 151.9930°E	At 54 Elk Street on over 35 acres (14 ha) of land.
Rosedale State School	Rosedale	Bundaberg	1896	24.6237°S 151.9147°E	P–12. At 21 James Street.
Urangan State High School	Urangan	Fraser Coast	1992	25.2966°S 152.8760°E	On Robert Street.
Yarraman State School	Yarraman	South Burnett	1901	26.8415°S 151.9767°E	Prep-9. At 17 John Street.

=== Other state schools ===
This includes special schools (schools for disabled children) and schools for specific purposes.

Name	Suburb	LGA	Opened	Coords	Notes
Bundaberg Special School	Norville	Bundaberg	1970	24.8868°S 152.3388°E	Prep to Year 12 special school. At 1 Dr Mays Road.
Gympie Special School	Gympie	Gympie	1972	26.1878°S 152.6808°E	Prep to Year 12 special school. At 52 Cootharaba Road.
Hervey Bay Special School	Kawungan	Fraser Coast	1986	25.2963°S 152.8523°E	Prep to Year 12 special school. At 23 Frangipanni Avenue.
Maryborough Special School	Maryborough	Fraser Coast	1969	25.5174°S 152.6955°E	Prep to Year 12 special school. At 164 Woodstock Street.

=== Defunct state schools ===
Name	Suburb	LGA	Opened	Closed	Coords	Notes
Abbeywood State School	Abbeywood	South Burnett	c.1914	1969	26.1070°S 151.6292°E	Located at 402 Cridlands Road on the eastern corner with Abbeywood Gayndah Road.
Albionville State School	Albionville (now in Bungadoo)	Bundaberg	1891	1962	approx 24.9906°S 152.0786°E	Located south of the River Road.
Alice Creek State School	Alice Creek	South Burnett	1927	1945	26.7608°S 151.5970°E	Located at 75 Alice Creek Road.
Allawah Provisional School	Gooroolba	North Burnett	1912	1917		
Allies Creek State School	Allies Creek (now in Monogorilby)	North Burnett	1935	1980		
Anderleigh State School	Anderleigh	Gympie	1895	1960	approx 26.0008°S 152.6795°E	Brookleigh Provisional School opened on 10 July 1895. In 1899, it was renamed Anderleigh Provisional School. It became Anderleigh State School in 1909. It closed on 24 July 1960. It was on the land of present-day 1310 Anderleigh Road opposite the present-day rural fire station.
Antigua State School	Antigua	Fraser Coast	1918	1937		
Apple Tree Creek State School	Apple Tree Creek	Bundaberg	1887	1969	approx 25.2146°S 152.2342°E	Apple Tree Creek Provisional School opened on 28 November 1887. It became Apple Tree Creek State School on 5 July 1897. It closed on 21 December 1969. It was on McGibbon Street.
Aramara North State School	North Aramara	Fraser Coast	1904	1908		Musket Flat Provisional School opened 1904. In 1908, it was relocated and renamed Bowling Green Provisional School, becoming Bowling Green State School in 1909. In 1940, it was renamed Aramara North State School. It was on the north-east corner of Musket Flat Road and an unnamed road going east to the Doongul Creek. It was moved to a new site in 1949 and finally permanently closed in 1983. It was on the north-western corner of Upper Bowling Green Road and North Aramara / Musket Flat Road. As at 2023, the school buildings are still extant and the site is now the North Aramara Recreation Reserve.
Aramara North State School	North Aramara	Fraser Coast	1908	1949	25.53896°S 152.32513°E	
Aramara North State School	North Aramara	Fraser Coast	1949	1983	25.55187°S 152.31842°E	
Aramara State School	Aramara	Fraser Coast	1899	1967		
Auburn River State School	Hawkwood	North Burnett	1969	2008		
Ballugan State School	near Brooweena	Fraser Coast	1907	1911		
Ban Ban Springs State School	Ban Ban Springs	North Burnett	1916	1965	25.68363°S 151.81644°E	Located on the south-western side of the Burnett Highway.
Bancroft State School	Bancroft	North Burnett	1922	1998	24.7856°S 151.2292°E	This school has had many different names. Refer to Queensland State Archives for full details. (PS = Provisional School) Names have included Many Peaks PS, 57 Mile Camp PS, 63 Mile Camp PS, Many Peaks 66 Mile Construction Camp PS, 67 Mile Camp PS, Railway Camp PS, the Barrimoon PS, PS Barrimoon Many Peaks, Railway Camp 74 PS, and Many Peaks Railway Camp PS 82 Mile. It was also known as Railway Camp 72 Mile Barrimoon PS, Railway Camp 79 Mile PS and Bancroft PS. It assumed its final name change on 1 August 1931. As Bancroft State School, it was located at 39 Bancroft School Road (24.7856°S 151.2292°E).
Bank's Pocket State School	Banks Pocket	Gympie	1904	1959	26.1538°S 152.6732°E	Bank's Pocket Provisional School opened on 3 June 1904. It became Bank's Pocket State School on 1 January 1909. It closed in 1959. The school was on a 5-acre (2.0 ha) site on Bank's Pocket Road (26.1538°S 152.6732°E). The North Coast railway line passed immediately west of the school during its operational period, but the line was realigned further east in the 1980s to facilitate electrification, terminating Bank's Pocket Road before reaching the school site.
Barambah Creek State School	Barambah	Gympie	1915	1953		
Barambah State School	Barambah	Gympie	1933	1941		
Barker's Creek State School	Brooklands	South Burnett	1895	1954	26.7111°S 151.8554°E	Located on the western bank of Barker Creek between Taabinga Road and Nanango Brooklands Road.
Barlil State School	Barlil	South Burnett	1925	1963	26.1940°S 151.8757°E	Located at 342 Paul Holznagel Road, just north of Silverleaf Road.
Barolin State School	Barolin (now in Windermere)	Bundaberg	1884	1974	24.8672°S 152.4467°E	Barolin State School was located 14 School Lane on the north-west corner of its intersection with Elliott Heads Road.
Beenam Range State School	Cedar Pocket	Gympie	1912	1965	approx 26.21669°S 152.79997°E	Note the spelling of the school's name differs from the nearby Beenaam Range. Located at approx 1106 Cedar Pocket Road. It was one of four small schools replaced by Gympie East State School.
Beeron Road State School	Deeri Derra	North Burnett	1927	1987	25.73062°S 151.30092°E	Located at 1070 Beeron Road. The school building is still extant and is used by the Beeron Road Country Club.
Benair State School	Benair	South Burnett	1911	1977	26.64256°S 151.70587°E	Boonare State School opened on 31 July 1911 but was renamed Benair State School later that year. It closed on 9 December 1977. It was at 433 Benair Road.
Berajondo State School	Berajondo	Bundaberg	1895	1965	24.62758°S 151.83250°E	Milsted Provisional School opened on 3 June 1895. On 1 January 1909, it became Milstead State School. In 1911, it was renamed Murray's Creek State School and then renamed in 1931 as Berajondo State School. It closed on 31 December 1965. It was at 173 Dawsons Road.
Berrembea State School	Berrembea (now in south-west Delan)	Bundaberg	1922	1967	25.02739°S 152.04050°E	Opened as Woodbine State School in 1922, renamed Berrembea State School in 1924. It was at 559 Berrembea Road.
Bidwell State School	Bidwill	Fraser Coast	1896	1936	25.61676°S 152.71243°E	The spelling of district name was originally Bidwell, but later changed to be Bidwill. Located at 741 Bidwill Road.
Bilburie State School	Coolambula	North Burnett	1931	1938	approx 25.55646°S 151.18164°E	Located on the western side of A Creek Road.
Bingera Railway Station State School	South Kolan	Bundaberg	1907	1963	approx 24.8976°S 152.1940°E	Located in James Street. The name refers to the nearby (former) Bingera railway station, which was at the intersection of Raines Road and Ten Mile Road.
Bingera South State School	South Bingera / Pine Creek	Bundaberg	1893	1965	24.8975°S 152.1929°E	Located at 152 South Bingera Road, within the present-day boundaries of Pine Creek.
Bingham State School	River Heads	Fraser Coast	1915	1926		It was on a 5-acre (2.0 ha) site. The town of River Heads was formerly known as Bingham.
Bingham Road State School	Bunya Creek	Fraser Coast	1915	1960	25.3453°S 152.8505°E	Opened 1915 as Urangan Road State School. Renamed 1956 Bingham Road State School (reflecting the renaming of the road). Located at 847 Booral Road (previously known as Urangan Road, Bingham Road, and Nikenbah Bingham Road).
Boat Mountain State School	Tablelands	South Burnett	1916	1954		
Bollier State School	Bollier	Gympie	1894	1946	26.4353°S 152.7340°E	Located at 287 Tuckeroi Road.
Bon Accord State School	Bon Accord	North Burnett	1901	1922	approx 25.58122°S 151.66291°E	Located on the eastern bank of Barambah Creek immediately north of the Bon Accord Wetheron Road.
Booie State School	Booie	South Burnett	c.1892	1963	26.49772°S 151.92865°E	Located at 1015 Booie Crawford Road.
Booinbah State School	Booinbah (now in south Tansey)	Gympie	1928	1957		
Boolboonda State School	Boolboonda	North Burnett	1882	1973	25.0829°S 151.6812°E	Listed on the Queensland Heritage Register.
Boompa State School	Boompa	Fraser Coast	1893	1963		
Boonara State School	Boonara	Gympie	1902	1964		
Boondooma State School	Boondooma	South Burnett	1923	1999	26.2943°S 151.2616°E	Originally called Durong State School, in 1970 it was renamed Boondooma State School following the closure of the earlier Boondooma State School in 1968 (see below). The school was at 9359 Mundubbera Durong Road.
Boondooma State School	Boondooma	South Burnett	1939	1968	26.2780°S 151.1846°E	This school has sometimes been incorrectly referred to as Boondooma West. It was on Brownless Road.
Boonooroo State School	Boonooroo	Fraser Coast	1911	1961		
Boonyouin State School	Boonyouin (now in Haly Creek)	South Burnett	1924	1953	approx 26.70249°S 151.70985°E	Known as Taabinga Road State School until 1 November 1924. Located at approx 758 Flagstone Creek Road.
Booubyjan State School	Booubyjan	Gympie	1934	1987	approx 25.96543°S 151.88555°E	In 1952, the school was south of the Old Murgon Gayndah Road.
Borumba Dam State School	Lake Borumba	Gympie	1961	1964	approx 26.50188°S 152.58773°E	Lake Borumba was created by building Borumba Dam (completed 1963) across Yabba Creek. Borumba Dam Provisional School opened on 23 January 1961 to provide schooling for the children of the dam workers who lived at the construction site. At the start of 1962, it became Borumba Dam State School with an average attendance of 54 students rising to an average of 61 students in 1963. The dam was completed in March 1964 and the workers and their children moved away with average attendance of 17 children in early 1964. The school closed on 29 May 1964. It was on the eastern side of Yabba Creek north of the dam wall.
Boyneside State School	Boyneside	South Burnett	1927	1969	approx26.72538°S 151.53306°E	On the north-western side of a bend in the Bunya Highway near its junction with Nords Road.
Brigooda State School	Brigooda	South Burnett	1924	1965	26.2540°S 151.4119°E	Opened as Lawson State School, renamed Bridooda in 1925. Located at 2473 Proston Boondooma Road.
Brooklands State School	Brooklands	South Burnett	1915	1973	26.74258°S 151.81553°E	Opened as Middle Creek in 1916, renamed Brooklands State School in 1971 but closed in 1973. Located at 36 Brooklands Pimpimbudgee Road.
Brooloo State School	Brooloo	Gympie	1907	1970	26.4918°S 152.7053°E	Opened 1907 as The Bluff Provisional School. Renamed 1915 as Brooloo State School. Located on the western side of the junction of Mary Valley Road and Moy Pocket Road.
Brovinia Creek State School	Brovinia	North Burnett	1945	1969		
Brown Ridge State School	Tiaro	Fraser Coast	1908	1925	25.7464°S 152.5375°E	Located on the western side of Nugent Road.
Bucca State School	Bucca	Bundaberg	1889	1964	24.8802°S 152.0839°E	Located at 172 South Bucca Road.
Buckland State School	South Nanango	South Burnett	1909	1959	26.7223°S 151.9738°E	Located at 13387 D'Aguilar Highway (on the south-western corner with Bucklands Road, 26.7223°S 151.9738°E). There is a sign on the fence with the school's name and years of operation.
Bukali State School	Bukali	North Burnett	1925	1963	approx 24.80963°S 151.15696°E	Originally called Monal Creek, renamed Bukali in 1936 reflecting its proximity to the Bukali railway station. Located to the east of Bukali railway station and Gladstone-Monto Road.
Bull Camp State School	Bullcamp	South Burnett	1913	1920	26.61975°S 152.09858°E	Located on the western side of Bullcamp Runnymede Road.
Bunya Creek State School	Bunya Creek	Fraser Coast	1882	c.1976?		
Bunya Mountains Provisional School	Bunya Mountains	South Burnett	1919	1922		
Bymingo State School	Mingo	North Burnett	1917	1954	25.44437°S 151.75806°E	Bymingo State School (also written as By-Mingo State School) was on the western side of the Gayndah Mount Perry Road.
Byrnestown State School	Byrnestown	North Burnett	1893	1931	25.54858°S 151.77670°E	It was also known as Old Byrnestown State School, after Byrnestown Central State School opened. On the western side of Gayndah - Mount Perry Road.
Byrnestown State School	Byrnestown	North Burnett	1913	1970	25.52324°S 151.75872°E	Opened 1913 as Byrnestown Central State School, renamed 1938 Byrnestown State School. At 28 Byrnes Parade (corner of King George Avenue).
Calgoa State School	Calgoa	Fraser Coast	1935	1951		Calgoa Provisional School opened as a part-time school (meaning a teacher was shared between the two schools) on 29 January 1935, but closed on 18 April 1935. It reopened on 10 April 1938.
Calgoa State School	Calgoa	Fraser Coast	1952	1953	approx 25.8786°S 152.24637°E	In 1952, it became Calgoa State School, relocating to a new 3-acre (1.2 ha) site donated by Mr V. G. Turner with a school building relocated from the then-closed Brooyar State School. It closed in December 1953. Its final location was north of Thunder Creek Road.
Calico Creek State School	Calico Creek	Gympie	1936	1970	26.29974°S 152.64754°E	Located at 8 Robinson Road (south-east corner of Calico Creek Road).
Cannindah State School	Cannindah	North Burnett	1932	1958	24.90723°S 151.22093°E	Located at 1070 Cannindah Road.
Carmyle State School	Carmyle (now in Sexton)	Gympie	1906		26.04049°S 152.46423°E	In 1921, the school was on the eastern side of Devil Mountain Road.
Carmyle State School	Carmyle (now in Sexton)	Gympie		1963	26.03520°S 152.48014°E	Between 1936 and 1961, the school was on the eastern corner of Lower Wide Bay Road and Carmyle Road (26.03520°S 152.48014°E).
Carter's Ridge State School	Carters Ridge	Gympie	1925	1967	26.4485°S 152.7657°E	Located at 894 Kenilworth Skyring Creek Road.
Cattle Creek Valley State School	Cattle Creek	North Burnett	1916	1971	approx 25.49367°S 151.29894°E	O'Bill Bill Creek State School opened in January 1916. In 1925, it was renamed Cattle Creek Valley State School. It closed on 12 March 1971. It was on the north-eastern side of Cattle Creek School Road.
Cedar Pocket State School	Cedar Pocket	Gympie	1906	1965	26.19870°S 152.74732°E	Located at 752 East Deep Creek Road (at the junction with Cedar Pocket Road). It was one of four small schools replaced by Gympie East State School.
Ceratodus State School	Ceratodus	North Burnett	1925	1965		
Charlestown Provisional School	Charlestown	South Burnett	circa 1894	circa 1894		
Chelmsford State School	Chelmsford	South Burnett	1910	1972	26.2686°S 151.8108°E	Located on the south-east corner of the intersection of Tingoora Chelmsford Road and Springs Road / Old Chemsford Road.
Cinnabar State School	Cinnabar	Gympie	1916	1971	26.1196°S 152.1860°E	Cinnabar Railway Station State School opened on 2 May 1916, but was renamed in July 1916 as Cinnabar State School. It closed in 1971. The school was at 362 Cinnabar Road.
Cinnabar Upper State School	Cinnabar	Gympie	1922	1927		
Clayton State School	Clayton (now in Alloway)	Bundaberg	1930	1971		
Clonmel State School	Clonmel (now in Mungungo)	North Burnett	1926	1967	24.74059°S 151.16890°E	Located on the eastern side of Monal Road.
Coles Creek State School	Coles Creek	Gympie	1891	1961	approx 26.3682°S 152.7545°E	Previously known as Traveston Provisional School, Skyring's Creek Provisional/State School. Located on the northern corner of the Old Bruce Highway and Coles Creek Road.
Coolabunia West State School	Coolabunia	South Burnett	c.1902	c.1936		
Coondoo State School	Coondoo	Gympie	1912	1968	26.1737°S 152.8900°E	Wolvi East Provisional School opened on 27 August 1912 as a half-time school in conjunction with Beenam Range Provisional School (meaning that a single teacher was shared between the two schools). About 1915 or 1916, it became a full-time provisional school. In 1917, it was renamed Coondoo Provisional School. In 1933, it became Coondoo State School. It closed about December 1968. It was located on the corner of Kin Kin Road and Stewart Road.
Cooranga Provisional School	near Mundubbera	North Burnett	1922	1923		Possibly at Old Cooranga?
Cootharaba Road State School	Cootharaba Road (now in Greens Creek)	Gympie	1894	1965	26.16932°S 152.71768°E	Located at 27 Grecian Bends Road. As at September 2022, the two school buildings are still extant on the site. It was one of four small schools replaced by Gympie East State School.
Coringa State School	Coringa	North Burnett	1930	1996	25.3843°S 151.9775°E	Located on Coringa Road.
Corndale State School	Corndale	South Burnett	1912	1959	26.43841°S 151.88832°E	Corndale Road (formerly Barkers Creek Road).
Craignish State School	Craignish	Fraser Coast	1938	1961	25.2901°S 152.7338°E	Approx 471 Craignish Road.
Crownthorpe State School	Crownthorpe	Gympie /South Burnett	1914	1952	approx 26.12682°S 151.94178°E	Crownthorpe Provisional School opened on 1 September 1914. On 1 December 1914, it became Crownthorpe State School. It closed in 1952. It was on the south-western corner of Crownthorpe Road and Goomeri West Road.
Cumonju State School	Wallaville	Bundaberg	1884	1967	25.06104°S 151.95316°E	Opened as Currajong Creek SS. Located on Ferry Hills Road.
Curra State School	Curra	Gympie	1893	1961	approx 26.0738°S 152.5891°E	At approximately 6 Curra Road.
Cushnie State School	Cushnie	South Burnett	1918	1972	26.32962°S 151.74213°E	Located at 790 Cushnie Road, corner of Reinkes Road.
Cynthia State School	Cynthia	North Burnett	1928	1954	25.21474°S 151.12956°E	Located in the former town of Cynthia on the western side of Abercorn Road (Burnett Highway) to the south-east of the former railway station
Dallarnil North State School	Dallarnil	North Burnett	1904	1937	approx 25.34200°S 152.00474°E	Located on the northern side of Grills Lane.
Dalysford State School	Moolboolaman	Bundaberg	circa 1892	1927	approx 25.0214°S 151.8734°E	Located to the south-west of Dalysford railway station, off the Dalysford Road within present-day Moolboolaman.
Deborah State School	Netherby	Fraser Coast	1885	1939	25.7830°S 152.4940°E	Located on Deborah Road (approx 25.78460°S 152.49088°E).
Degilbo State School	Degilbo	North Burnett	1894	2007	25.4829°S 151.9971°E	Opened as Woowoonga Provisional School in 1894, renamed Degilbo Provisional School in 1898. Located at 598 Gooroolba Road. The school's website was archived.
Derrarabungy Provisional School	Beeron	North Burnett	1932	1942	25.84823°S 151.30011°E	Located north-west of where Beeron Road crosses Derrarabungy Creek.
Derri Derra State School	Derri Derra	North Burnett	1927	1971	25.72314°S 151.21660°E	On the north-west corner of the junction of Mundubbera Durong Road and Back Derra Road.
Diamond Field State School	Amamoor	Gympie	1913	1939	approx 26.3640°S 152.6550°E	Diamond Field State School opened on 26 November 1913 under head teacher Miss Emily Mary Appleton. The school closed on 2 March 1939 due to the opening of Forest Station State School. It was on the eastern side of Diamondfield Road.
Didcot State School	Didcot	North Burnett	1908	1967	25.4766°S 151.8645°E	Didcot Provisional School opened on 23 November 1908. On 1 January 1909, it became Didcot State School. It closed in 1967. The school was on a 10-acre (4.0 ha) site on the south-western corner of Merritt Street and Hamilton Street.
Dirnbir State School	Dirnbir	North Burnett	1915	circa 1933	approx 25.60525°S 151.56172°E	Located on a five-acre-one-rood (2.1 ha) site near the Dirnbir railway station on Shepherds Road.
Doolbi State School	Doolbi	Bundaberg	1921	1953		
Doongal Lower Provisional School	Gungaloon	Fraser Coast	circa 1893	1896–1915	approx 25.50716°S 152.44329°E	It is unclear precisely when this school opened or closed. Subscriptions were called for in 1893 to build the school. The school was still operating in 1896 as a teacher was transferred there. In 1915, the school building was sold for removal.
Downsfield State School	Downsfield	Gympie	1918	1966	approx 26.04967°S 152.72079°E	Located on a 5-acre (2.0 ha) site on the bend of Kenins Road .
Drinan State School	Drinan	Bundaberg	1927	1963	25.04733°S 152.02251°E	Located on a 1-acre (0.40 ha) site on Berrembea Road to the south-east of the railway station.
Drummer's Creek State School	Drummers Creek (now in north Mount Perry)	North Burnett	1880	1959	25.1404°S 151.6253°E	Located at 1 School Lane.
Duckinwilla Creek State School	Duckinwilla	Fraser Coast	1936	1953		
Duingal State School	Duingal	Bundaberg	circa 1896	circa 1913		
Dundowran State School	Dundowran	Fraser Coast	1891	1960		
Dunmora State School	Dunmora	Fraser Coast	circa 1881	1912		
Dunmora Central State School	Dunmora	Fraser Coast	1899	1941	25.52686°S 152.50283°E	Located on the southern side of Old Gayndah Road.
Durong State School	Durong	South Burnett	1923	1999		Note this is the same school listed above as Boondooma State School.
Electra State School	Electra	Bundaberg	1892	1966		After closure, the school building was relocated to Airy Park State School (later renamed Elliot Heads State School) in Elliott Heads.
Elgin Vale State School	Elgin Vale	Gympie	1927	1979	26.4409°S 152.1950°E	At 2876 Manumbar Road.
Ellesmere State School	Ellesmere	South Burnett	1916	1961	26.74038°S 151.72160°E	At 938 Kumbia Road (north-east corner of Ellesmere Road). As at November 2020, the school building was still extant on the site.
Erin Hill State School	Splitters Creek (now in Sharon)	Bundaberg	1917	1957	24.8546°S 152.2356°E	At 411 Ten Mile Road in Splitters Creek area. While most of the Splitters Creek area is now within the locality of Meadowvale, the school site is now within the locality of Sharon.
Fairdale State School	Fairdale	South Burnett	1910	1932	26.27795°S 151.77512°E	Originally known as Mondure Central State School until 1932. It was on the northern side of Red Hill Road.
Fairdale State School	Fairdale	South Burnett	1932	1972	26.2584°S 151.7673°E	It was relocated to the west of the junction of Fairdale Road (also known as Mondure Cushnie Road) and Springs Road.
Fairymead State School	Fairymead	Bundaberg	1893	1983	approx 24.8094°S 152.3484°E	Located at the eastern end of Colvins Road.
Ferry Hills State School	Wallaville	Bundaberg	1904	1956	25.08367°S 151.92514°E	Located at 576 Ferry Hills Road.
Fleetwood Provisional School		Gooroolba, Queensland	c.July 1913	c.1915		Originally opened as Mingo Crossing Provisional School and operated as a half-time school with Allawah Provisional School
Fontainebleau State School	Branch Creek	North Burnett	1915	1964	25.4182°S 151.4163°E	Located on a three-acre (1.2 ha) site on the north-eastern side of Binjour Branch Creek Road.
Forest Station State School	Amamoor Creek	Gympie	1939	1965	approx 26.36174°S 152.63478°E	The school was on Amamoor Creek Road adjacent to the Amamoor State Forest, near the Amama Day Use Area. It replaced Diamond Field State School.
Fraser Island Provisional School	Fraser Island	Fraser Coast	1937	1941		
Gaeta State School	Gaeta	Bundaberg	1957	1975		
Gallangowan State School	Gallangowan (now in Manumbar)	Gympie	1940	1996	approx 26.4324°S 152.3289°E	Located in the Gallangowan State Forest near Gallangowan Oval Road.
Gayndah Aboriginal State School	Gayndah	North Burnett	1918	1949		
Ginoondan State School	Ginoondan	North Burnett	1903	1949	25.59762°S 151.73406°E	On the eastern corner of the Burnett Highway and the Gayndah Mount Perry Road.
Glastonbury State School	Glastonbury	Gympie Region	1879	1960	approx 26.21296°S 152.51720°E	Also known as Glastonbury Creek State School. Located on the western corner of intersection of Gordon Street, Betts Street, and Diggins Road.
Glen Leigh State School	Glenleigh	North Burnett	1916	1937	approx	Euruga State School opened on 7 June 1932, but on 13 June it was renamed Aberfeldie State School.
Glen Leigh State School	Glenleigh	North Burnett	1937	1964	approx 25.0421°S 151.0705°E	In 1937, the school building was relocated and renamed Glen Leigh State School. It closed in December 1961. It was located on the eastern corner of Glenleigh Road and Booths Road (approx 25.0421°S 151.0705°E).
Glen Loch State School	Abercorn	North Burnett	1931	1944	approx 25.1484°S 151.1797°E	On the Burnett Highway.
Glencliff State School	Glencliff (now Alice Creek)	South Burnett	1923	1949	approx 26.76035°S 151.66776°E	Sometimes written as Glencliffe State School. Located on the eastern side of Glencliffe Road.
Glenecho State School	Glen Echo	Gympie	1932	1967	25.90653°S 152.41406°E	On a 5-acre (2.0 ha) site at 626 Glen Echo Road.
Gleneden State School	Binjour	North Burnett	1913	1953	25.5588°S 151.4612°E	On a five-acre (2.0 ha) site at 1028 Humphery Binjour Road (25.5588°S 151.4612°E).
Glenrae State School	Glenrae	North Burnett	1914	1963	approx 25.65384°S 151.34604°E	Sometimes written as Glen Rae State School. Located on the north-west corner of the junction of Glenrae Dip Road and Back Glenrae Road.
Glenrock State School	Glenrock	South Burnett	1926	1966	26.10136°S 151.79955°E	At 106 Glenrock Road (corner of Louttits Road).
Goodger State School	Goodger	South Burnett	1915	1962	26.65649°S 151.81885°E	Opened 1915 as Stratharlie State School No 839, renamed 1917 renamed Goodger State School. Located at Kingaroy Cooyar Road.
Goodnight Scrub State School	Good Night	North Burnett/ Bundaberg	1919	1942		
Goomaran / Goomaram Creek State School	Wuruma Dam	North Burnett	1931	1948	approx 25.15223°S 151.04625°E	The spelling of the school's name varies in the sources. The school was on the southern side of Goomaram Road.
Goomboorian State School	Goomboorian	Gympie	1902	1967	approx 26.07739°S 152.78139°E	Located at approx 8–10 Tagigan Road, extending south to Tinana Creek.
Gooroolba State School	Gooroolba	North Burnett	1911	1964		
Granite Hill State School	Mount Debateable	North Burnett	1926	1957		Originally known as Mount Debateable State School 1912–1925
Green Ridge State School	Traveston	Gympie	1912	1960	approx 26.3299°S 152.7309°E	Located on the south-eastern corner of Old Bruce Highway and Old Traveston Road.
Greendale State School	Glastonbury	Gympie	1930	1960	approx 26.17868°S 152.52552°E	Located in Greendale (northern part of Glastonbury) near Glastonbury Creek.
Greenview State School	Greenview	South Burnett	1905	1973	26.3139°S 151.8038°E	Located at 696 Tingoora Chelmsford Road.
Grindstone State School	Glan Devon	South Burnett	1907	1954	26.6191°S 152.0238°E	Located on the north side of Grindstone School Road.
Gosvenor State School	Grosvenor	North Burnett	1932	1940	approx 25.45457°S 151.17560°E	Located south of the Grosvenor railway station.
Grosvenor Flat State School	Grosvenor	North Burnett	1892	1908	25.45457°S 151.17560°E	Grosvenor Flat Provisional School opened on 19 September 1892 and closed on 18 March 1908. It reopened on 8 May 1916 as Grosvenor Flat State School but closed in 1926. It was on A Creek Road.
Grosvenor Flat State School	Grosvenor	North Burnett	1916	1926	25.45457°S 151.17560°E	Grosvenor Flat Provisional School opened on 19 September 1892 and closed on 18 March 1908. It reopened on 8 May 1916 as Grosvenor Flat State School but closed in 1926. It was on A Creek Road.
Gungaloon State School	Thinoomba	Fraser Coast	1921	1931	25.57786°S 152.43654°E	Located on the eastern side of the junction of Thinoomba Road and Ross Road.
Gurgeena State School	Gurgeena	North Burnett	1912	1959	25.4593°S 151.3986°E	Located on the north side of Top Gurgeena Road.
Haly Creek State School	Haly Creek	South Burnett	1910	1967	26.67955°S 151.75517°E	Located at 299 Ellesmere Road.
Harpur's Hill State School	Mount Perry	North Burnett	1908	circa 1924	25.1382°S 151.5645°E	Located on a two-acre (0.81 ha) site on the western side of Homestead Road.
Harrami State School	Harrami	North Burnett	1941	1966	24.76211°S 150.63941°E	Located on a five-acre (2.0 ha) site at 1546 Harrami Road.
Hillsdale State School	Hillsdale (now in Booie)	South Burnett	1916	1966	26.54348°S 151.94167°E	Located at 6 Mcauliffes Road.
Hivesville State School	Hivesville	South Burnett	1924	1968	26.1758°S 151.6964°E	Located in Hivesville Road.
Hodgleigh State School	Hodgleigh	South Burnett	1902	1956		Originally called Horse Creek Provisional School and in 1907 renamed Bell Bird Provisional School. In 1909 it became Bell Bird School before being renamed Hodgeleigh State School in 1923.
Holbrook State School	Wattle Camp district	South Burnett	1895	1897		Was possibly called Holbrook (or Hollbrook) Provisional School and was a half-time school in conjunction with Booie State School. Few records remain of this school. The teacher at the time of its closing was Miss Mary Jane McNicol, later to become Mrs. Perrett and a lifetime resident of the district.
Hollywell State School	via Eidsvold	North Burnett	1929	1935		
Home Creek State School	Cushnie	South Burnett	1906	1949	26.3667°S 151.7689°E	Located on the south-western corner of the intersection of Chinchilla Wondai Road and Denmark/Harms Road. The watercourse Home Creek flows through the area and is presumably the origin of the name.
Ideraway State School	Ideraway	North Burnett	1909	circa 1952	25.5792°S 151.6203°E	Located on the south-east corner of Tanjour Street and Bonny Street.
Imbil State School	Imbil	Gympie	1897	2002		Became Mary Valley State College.
Inskip Point Provisional School	Inskip	Gympie	circa 1884	circa 1893		
Inverlaw State School	Inverlaw	South Burnett	1907	1968	26.59064°S 151.74916°E	Opened 1907 as Four Mile Gully Provisional School, renamed 1912 Inverlaw State School. Located at 168 Wooden Hut Road on the corner of Inverlaw School Road.
Ironbark Ridge State School	Bauple	Fraser Coast	1939	1960	25.7774°S 152.6042°E	Originally located on the western side of the Bruce Highway, following the realignment of Bruce Highway to bypass Bauple to the west in the 1970s, the current street address of the former school site is 947 Bauple Drive.
Ironpot Creek State School	Ironpot	South Burnett	1916	1974	26.5826°S 151.3885°E	Located on a three-acre (1.2 ha) site on the western corner of Ironpot Road and McGills Road.
Isis Central Mill State School	North Isis	Bundaberg	1889	1987	25.19540°S 152.20151°E	On the north-eastern corner of Kevin Livingstone Drive and Madsens Road.
Isis South State School	South Isis	Bundaberg	1887	1936	25.26985°S 152.30644°E	Located on a 5-acre (2.0 ha) site at 3 Jackson Road.
Jarail Creek State School	Jarail Creek (now in Ironpot)	South Burnett	c.1917 & 1950	c. 1935 & 1978		Was located at 642 Jarail Road, Ironpot. May have closed c.1935 and reopened at the Jarail Road site in 1950.
Johnstown Provisional School	Johnstown	South Burnett	1916	1935	approx 26.43474°S 152.12585°E	Johnstown Provisional School opened on 27 March 1916 and closed on 1 September 1924. It reopened on 18 April 1933 and closed on 20 February 1935. Located on the western side of Johnstown Road.
Johnstown West State School	Johnstown (now in Charlestown)	South Burnett	1938	1967	26.41127°S 152.02283°E	Located on the western side of Barker Creek, which is one of the watercourses now impounded by the construction of the Bjelke-Petersen Dam, inundating land in this area. However, the school's land parcel is still in existence at 1 Forestry Road, Charlestown.
Kalbar State School	South Kolan	Bundaberg	1896	1962		Not to be confused with Kalbar State School in Kalbar in the Scenic Rim Region.
Kalpowar State School	Kalpowar	North Burnett	1923	1997	24.6936°S 151.3041°E	Located on a four-acre (1.6 ha) site at 2–6 Pine Street.
Kandanga State School	Kandanga Creek	Gympie	1914	1947		Originally known as Kadanga Township State School.
Kandanga Creek State School	Kandanga Creek	Gympie	1900	2009	26.4020°S 152.6359°E	Located on a five-acre (2.0 ha) site at 249 Sterling Road. The school's website was archived.
Kanigan State School	Kanigan	Fraser Coast	1892	1959		
Kapaldo State School	Kapaldo	North Burnett	1929	1947	approx 25.0566°S 151.1327°E	On the Anyarro Kapaldo Road.
Keysland State School	Keysland	South Burnett	1915	1974	26.2147°S 151.7423°E	On the south-western corner of Wondai Proston Road and Kayes Road.
Kinbombi State School	Kinbombi	Gympie	1926	1938	26.1986°S 152.1179°E	Located off the Wide Bay Highway.
Kinleymore State School	Kinleymore	South Burnett	1913	1969	26.1785°S 151.6555°E	Located on the southern corner of Kinleymore School Road and Middle Road.
Kolan North State School	North Kolan (now in Bucca)	Bundaberg	1901	1988		
Kunioon State School	Kunioon	South Burnett	1891	1931		
Kunioon West State School	Goodger	South Burnett	1902	1946	26.65598°S 151.86448°E	Located on the north-western corner of the intersection of Goodger Gully Road, Kunioon West Road, and School Road.
Kybong State School	Kybong	Gympie	1905	1960	26.28674°S 152.71067°E	Located at 1320 Old Bruce Highway.
Lagoon Pocket State School	Lagoon Pocket (now in Long Flat)	Gympie	1882	1970	26.2729°S 152.6679°E	Located at 57 Lagoon Pocket Road.
Lakeside State School	Lakeside	North Burnett	1911	1948		
Langley Flat State School	Langley Flat	North Burnett	1927	1947		
Langshaw State School	Langshaw	Gympie	1914	1962	26.3032°S 152.5727°E	Previously Eel Creek State School. Located approx 1576 Eel Creek Road.
Leafdale State School	Leafdale	South Burnett	1924	1933	26.2486°S 151.7693°E	Located at 32 Fairdale Road (corner of McEuan Road).
Littebella Creek State School	Yandaran	Bundaberg	1899	circa 1935		Littebella Creek Provisional School opened in 1899. On 1 January 1909, it became Littebella Creek State School. It closed circa 1935.
Magnolia State School	Magnolia	Fraser Coast	1917	1941		Magnolia State School opened on 8 August 1917 as an "open-air" school with 15 students under head teacher Miss M. Gilmer. Its official opening was delayed for various reasons but finally took place in June 1918.
Magnolia State School	Bidwill (just north of Magnolia)	Fraser Coast	1941	1963	25.64378°S 152.69715°E	In 1940, a decision was made to relocate the school to a new site. In July 1941, the school was officially opened on the new 5-acre (2.0 ha) site on the northern side of Tulesco Road (now within neighbouring Bidwill).
Maidenwell State School	in the vicinity of Maidenwell					Several schools took the name of Maidenwell State School during their history. These included Tanduringie State School, which is still open and was known as Maidenwell between 1935 and 1949 - see list above of current schools. Another school opened under the name of Maidenwell (Anderson's Mill) and later became Wengenville State School - see below. The Pimpimbudgee State School (see below) was also known as Maidenwell when it opened in 1921.
Malar State School	Malar (now in Booie)	South Burnett	c.1901	1955	approx 26.5938°S 151.9779°E	Opened as Malar Provisional School in 1901. On 1 January 1909 it became Malar State School. There were a number of temporary closures until the school closed permanently.
Mannuem Creek State School	Mannuem	South Burnett	1911	1983	approx 26.6230°S 151.6066°E	Located on the north-east corner of Mannuem Road and Johnstons Road. The buildings were purchased by Kingaroy Lutheran Church and relocated to establish St John's Lutheran School in Kingaroy.
Manumbar State School	Manumbar	Gympie	1924	1947	26.3973°S 152.2767°E	Located on the north-east corner of Manumbar Road and Main Creek Road. Its buildings were relocated to Manumbar Mill State School in 1949.
Manumbar Mill State School	Manumbar	Gympie	1925	1968	approx 26.4088°S 152.3615°E	Located on Mill Road (no longer extant), off Manumbar Road.
Manyung State School	Manyung	Gympie	1912	1963		
Maryborough Central State Infants School	Maryborough	Fraser Coast	1878	1986		Amalgamated into SS
Meandu Creek State School	Barker Creek Flat	South Burnett	1909	1960		
Memerambi State School	Memerambi	South Burnett	1905	2007	26.4505°S 151.8279°E	Located at 1–27 King Street. The school's website was archived.
Merlwood State School	Merlwood	South Burnett	1910	1967	26.1508°S 151.8888°E	Located on the north-west corner of Pringle Hill Road and Eisenmengers Road, just north of the Gayndah Road.
Miara State School	Miara	Bundaberg	circa 1899	1922	24.67000°S 152.19292°E	Miara Provisional School opened circa 1899. On 1 January 1909, it became Miara State School. It closed circa 1922. It was on the southern corner in a bend in Miara Road.
Middle Creek State School	Brooklands	South Burnett	1916	1973	26.74258°S 151.81553°E	Opened as Middle Creek, renamed Brooklands State School in 1971 but closed in 1973. Located at 36 Brooklands Pimpimbudgee Road.
Miva State School	Miva	Gympie	circa 1888	circa 1934	25.95140°S 152.49366°E	Miva Provisional School opened about 1888, becoming Miva State School on 1 January 1909. In March 1922, it became a half-time provisional school, sharing its teacher with the Sexton State School, who taught at each school in alternating weeks. The two schools were closed in September 1924. It reopened in 1926 as a provisional school, but closed finally about 1934. It was on Munna Miva Road beside the Mary River.
Monal State School	Monal	North Burnett	1892	circa 1916	approx 24.4975°S 151.1349°E	Located in the former town of Monal on the Monal goldfield.
Monduran State School	Monduran	Bundaberg	1910	1922	approx 24.82530°S 151.90697°E	Located on a 5-acre (2.0 ha) site west of Monduran Road.
Mondure State School	Mondure	South Burnett	1921	1998	26.1809°S 151.7692°E	Opened as Mondure Township State School in 1921, renamed Mondure State School in 1938. Located at 741 Kawl Kawl Road. It was converted into a private residence.
Mondure North State School	Mondure	South Burnett	23 January 1905	October 1922	26.2333°S 151.7816°E	Opened in 1905 and closed in 1922. The school building was relocated to become the Leafdale State School in 1924.
Moolboolaman State School	Moolboolaman	Bundaberg	1908	1957	25.0065°S 151.8089°E	Located immediately north of the Moolboolaman railway station on the Gin Gin Mount Perry Road.
Mooloo State School	Mooloo	Gympie	1919	1962	approx 26.3019°S 152.6089°E	Located at approx 712 Mooloo Road.
Moonford State School	Moonford	North Burnett	1934	1982	24.7619°S 151.0356°E	Located at 551 Cania Road.
Moorland State School	Moorland	Bundaberg	1886	1975	approx 24.73645°S 152.1827°E	Originally known as Greenwood Provisional School, then Moorland Provisional School from 1899, then Moorland State School from 1909. Located on Moorland Road.
Mothar Mountain State School	Mothar Mountain	Gympie	1908	1970	approx 26.2437°S 152.7486°E	Called Mother Mountain State School until the spelling error was correct in 1929. Located on the western side of the Noosa Road north of the junction with Shadbolt, roughly opposite the Mothar Mountain Hall. The school building is no longer extant.
Mount Appallan State School	Degilbo	North Burnett	1902	1953	25.4376°S 152.0024°E	Located at 33 Cheese Factory Road. It was named after Mount Appallan.
Mount Mahen Provisional School	Mount Mahen (now in Ironpot)	South Burnett	1925	1930		
Mount Marcella State School	Mount Marcella (now in Booubyjan)	Gympie	1958	1963		
Mount Shamrock State School	Mount Shamrock (now Didcot)	North Burnett	1890	circa 1935	25.4393°S 151.9231°E	Mount Shamrock Provisional School opened on 24 February 1890, closing circa 1894. The school reopened on 7 April 1896 as Mount Shamrock Provisional School. On 1 January 1909, it became Mount Shamrock State School. It closed circa 1935. It was on a 10-acre (4.0 ha) land parcel on Mount Shamrock Road.
Mount Stanley Road State School	East Nanango	South Burnett	1925	1957	26.6503°S 152.0484°E	Mount Stanley Road School was 4 miles from Nanango on the north side of Mount Stanley Road (26.6503°S 152.0484°E) in East Nanango.
Mount Steadman State School	Mount Steadman	North Burnett	1920	1953		
Mount Urah State School	Netherby	Fraser Coast	1909	1927		Originally Mount Uruah Provisional School, opened 31 October 1909, name changed in 1913 to Mount Urah State School. Closed briefly in 1921 but opened soon after as a half-time school with Deborah State School, closing permanently on 1 April 1927. Located in the vicinity of Netherby, Queensland. It closed permanently on 1 April 1927.
Mullett Creek State School	Mullett Creek	Bundaberg	1910	1963	approx 24.65528°S 152.06148°E	Mullett Creek Provisional School opened circa August 1910 as a half-time school with Baffle Creek Provisional School (meaning they shared a single teacher between the two schools). Baffle Creek School closed in 1915, after which Mullett Creek Provisional school remained a half-time school with Arthur's Creek Provisional School. In 1916 it became a full-time school (no longer sharing its teacher). On 17 January 1920, it became Mullett Creek State School. It closed circa 1963. The school name sometimes appears as "Mullet" (one "t"). Mullett Creek State School was east of the Mullett Creek railway station on Brandts Road.
Mundowran State School	Mundowran	North Burnett	1913	1960	25.53806°S 151.31724°E	Located at 464 Bald Hills Norris Corner Road.
Munna Creek State School	Munna Creek	Fraser Coast	1890	1986	25.8963°S 152.4778°E	Munna Creek Provisional School was officially opened on 26 May 1890 by its first teacher Miss Ryan. On 1 January 1909, it became Munna Creek State School. It closed on 12 December 1986. The school was at 1458 Bauple Woolooga Road.
Nantglyn State School	Mundowran near Mundubbera	North Burnett	1917	1929		Originally opened as Pumpkin Hut State School
Neumgna State School	Neumgna	South Burnett	1920	1955	approx 26.8213°S 151.8987°E	The former school site is now within the Meandu coal mine.
Neusavale (Neusa Vale) State School	Neusa Vale	Gympie	1933	1962	26.19444°S 152.84038°E	Located at 643 Neusavale Road. It was one of four small schools replaced by Gympie East State School.
New Cannindah State School	Cannindah	North Burnett	1948	1958		
New Moonta State School	New Moonta	Bundaberg	1904	1926	25.03758°S 151.72032°E	Located at 209 Nellers Road.
Nikenbah State School	Nikenbah	Fraser Coast	1913	1963		
Nogo River Junction State School	Ceratodus	North Burnett	1927	1941	approx 25.27774°S 151.07209°E	Nogo River Junction State School opened on 4 July 1927 and closed circa 1941. It was on Nogo River Road on the eastern bank of the Nogo River at its junction with the Burnett River.
North Deep Creek State School	North Deep Creek	Gympie	1921	1967	26.08497°S 152.68156°E	Located at 256 Young Road.
North Isis State School (Barnes)	North Isis	Bundaberg	1887	1942		
Norwood State School	Reids Creek	North Burnett	1920	1952	25.4923°S 151.5156°E	Located on Reids Creek Road near the intersection with present-day Guyatts Road.
Nukku State School	Nukku	South Burnett	1928	1967	approx 26.8811°S 152.06555°E	Located to the south of the D'Aguilar Highway near the Nukka Road Road junction. The former school building was relocated to Blackbutt to house the Roy Emerson Museum.
Nulla Creek State School	Nulla Creek (now in Coringa)	North Burnett	1936	1947		Nulla Creek and Nulla Creek Road are both in Coringa.
Oakdale State School	Oakdale	South Burnett	1916	1941	26.1989°S 151.9102°E	It was on the north-east corner of Gessler and Crownthorpe Roads.
Oakview State School	Oakview	Gympie	1895	1963	26.09276°S 152.32215°E	The Oakview Provisional School opened in 1895. It closed temporarily in 1901, reopening in 1902. In 1913, it became a half-time school, sharing its teacher with Running Creek Provisional School. In 1914, it resumed its full-time status but closed later that year. The school reopened as Oakview State School on 12 September 1918, but closed again in 1928. It reopened for the last time on 1 June 1937 as Oakview State School and closed permanently in 1963. It was on Oakview Road.
O'Bil Bil State School	O'Bil Bil	North Burnett	1914	1925	25.54282°S 151.23094°E	Malmoe State School opened in August 1914. It was on the northern side of Augustines Road.
O'Bil Bil State School	O'Bil Bil	North Burnett	1925	1964	25.51442°S 151.21442°E	In 1925, the school was relocated to a new site near the O'Bil Bil railway station. In 1928, it was renamed O'Bil Bil State School. It closed circa 1964. It was at 80 O'Bil Bil Road.
Paradise Provisional School	Paradise	North Burnett	circa 1892	1904		
Perry River State School	Perry River (now in Morganville)	Bundaberg	1925	1988	25.17721°S 151.95788°E	Located at 90 Perry River Farms Road.
Philpott Central State School	Philpott	North Burnett	1913	1948	25.5883°S 151.3727°E	Located on a four-acre (1.6 ha) site off Shallcross Road.
Pie Creek State School	Pie Creek	Gympie	1896	1962	26.24139°S 152.61843°E	Located at 494 Eel Creek Road. The school building was still extant when the property was sold on 7 February 2023.
Pimpimbudgee State School	Pimpimbudgee	South Burnett	1921	1946		Was known as Maidenwell Provisional School from 1921 to 1922.
Pioneer's Rest State School	Pioneers Rest	Fraser Coast	1870	1960	approx 25.6655°S 152.5768°E	Located to the south-east of the bend in Mungar Creek Access Road.
Poona State School	Poona	Fraser Coast	1915	1933		
Proston Provisional School	near Proston	South Burnett	1917	1918		This school was located at the Proston Branch Railway line construction camp.
Pumpkin Hut State School	Pumpkin Hut (now in Mundowran)	North Burnett	1917	1929		Changed name to Nantglyn State School in 1925. Nantglyn is now in Mundowran.
Redbank Gully State School	Skyring Reserve	Bundaberg	1898	1963	approx 25.03382°S 151.97567°E	Redbank Gully Provisional School opened on 10 October 1898. On 1 January 1909, it became Redbank Gully State School. It closed on 28 January 1963. It was at approx 33849 Bruce Highway.
Redgate State School	Redgate	South Burnett	1908	1934	approx 26.25006°S 152.00660°E	Located on the eastern side of Finnemores Road. The school was relocated in 1934.
Redgate State School	Redgate	South Burnett	1934	1973	26.27097°S 152.01876°E	Located at 19 Goschnicks Road.
Redvale State School	Redvale (now in Booie)	South Burnett	1911	1939	26.53998°S 151.88913°E	Originally known as Three Mile State School. Redvale is now in Booie. Located on the north-east corner of Kingaroy Barkers Creek Road and Redvale Road.
Reedy Creek State School	Benair	South Burnett	1911	1963	26.60932°S 151.65045°E	Located at 993 Reedy Creek Road.
Reid's Creek State School	Reids Creek	North Burnett	1909	1963	25.53873°S 151.54570°E	Located on the north-east corner of the Burnett Highway and an unnamed road running east to the creek Reids Creek.
Reid's Creek Upper State School	Reids Creek	North Burnett	1903	1922	approx 25.5168°S 151.5465°E	Located in a pocket of the creek.
Riverleigh State School	Riverleigh	North Burnett	1913	2009	25.5855°S 151.2121°E	Located at 289 Coonambula-Eidsvold Road. The school's website was archived.
Rossendale State School	Bauple	Fraser Coast	1919	1962	25.8400°S 152.5960°E	Located on the southern side of Bauple Drive (25.8400°S 152.5960°E).
Rossmore State School	Kilkivan		c.1915	c.1943		Originally opened as Fairfield State School. Changed name to Rossmore in 1916
Rubyanna Provisional School	Rubyanna	Bundaberg	circa 1899	1905	approx 24.81790°S 152.38896°E	On the Rubyanna sugar plantation.
Running Creek State School	Woolooga	Gympie	1903	1942		Running Creek flows through Woolooga.
Runnymede State School	Runnymede	South Burnett	1948	1964	26.53205°S 152.07291°E	Located at 100 Scott Lane.
Sandy Ridges State School	Sandy Ridges	South Burnett	1910	1956	26.52758°S 152.01225°E	Located at 1634 Burnett Highway.
Scrubby Creek State School	Scrubby Creek	Gympie	1934	1960	26.20514°S 152.58153°E	Located at 707 Rocks Road.
Scotchy Pocket State School	Scotchy Pocket	Gympie	1900	1920	26.01237°S 152.51178°E	Scotchy Pocket Provisional School opened in 1900. On 1 January 1909, it became Scotchy Pocket State School. The school closed in 1920 due to low student numbers. In 1921, it was on a 4-acre (1.6 ha) land parcel on an unnamed road off Scotchy Pocket Road.
Scotchy Pocket State School	Scotchy Pocket	Gympie	1938	circa 1944	approx 26.0084°S 152.5195°E	It reopened in 1938 and finally closed circa 1944. In 1941, it was located on the western side of Scotchy Pocket Road (approx 26.0084°S 152.5195°E).
Selene State School	Selene	North Burnett	1926	1938		Originally proposed to be named Mulgeldie State School.
Selene State School	Selene	North Burnett	1938	1965	25.0086°S 151.1655°E	At 261 Selene Hall Road.
Sexton State School	Sexton	Gympie	1913	1924	approx 26.00127°S 152.43871°E	Sexton Provisional School opened in 1913. On 1 December 1914, it became Sexton State School. In March 1922, it became a half-time provisional school in conjunction with Miva Provisional School (meaning the two schools shared a single teacher who taught at each school in alternating weeks). The two schools were closed in September 1924. The school was on a 2-acre (0.81 ha) site in the north-eastern corner of the council's gravel reserve.
Silverleaf State School	Silverleaf	South Burnett	1912	1963	approx 26.17118°S 151.82078°E	Located on Silverleaf Road.
Speedwell State School	Speedwell	South Burnett	1912	1963	26.0751°S 151.5421°E	Located at the kink in Speedwell School Road.
Splinter Creek Bridge State School	Splinter Creek	North Burnett	1934	1958	24.95695°S 151.22862°E	Located on the south-west corner of Mountain View Road and Normans Road.
St Kilda State School	St Kilda	Bundaberg	1915	1923	25.04978°S 151.93009°E	Located on the south-east corner of Currajong Farms Road and Booths Road.
St Mary's Provisional School	St Mary	Fraser Coast	1949	1955	approx 25.65463°S 152.44788°E	St Mary's Provisional School opened on 17 October 1949 within the forestry reserve. It closed on 26 August 1955. It was on the western side of Thinoomba Road.
Stonelands State School	Stonelands	South Burnett	1932	1967	26.0826°S 151.7140°E	Located at 983 Stonelands Road.
Stuart Valley State School	Taabinga	South Burnett	1911	1961	26.61094°S 151.78445°E	Opened 1911 as Erin Vale State School, renamed 1912 as Stuart Valley State School. Located at approx 15 Toomeys Road to the east of the Stuart River.
Sunny Nook State School	Sunny Nook	South Burnett	1927	1945	26.11467°S 151.88375°E	Located on a 3-acre (1.2 ha) site on the northern side of Headings Road.
Takilberan Rock Provisional School	Takilberan	Bundaberg	1917	1922		Takilberan Rock Provisional School opened on 17 September 1917 and closed on 20 September 1922.
Takura State School	Takura	Fraser Coast	1907	1964	25.32937°S 152.71682°E	Takura Provisional School opened in 1908. On 1 January 1909, it became Takura State School. It closed on 21 February 1964. The school was at 654–668 Torbanlea Pialba Road (western corner of Takura School Road). As at June 2024, the school building is still extant.
Tamaree State School	Tamaree	Gympie	1923	1965		
Tandaringie State School	near Pimpimbudgee	South Burnett	1915	1933		Has also been referred to as Tandaringie Tent School.
Tandur State School	Tandur	Gympie	1924	1967	26.28630°S 152.75752°E	Located on the western side of the Tandur Traveston Road.
Tansey State School	Tansey	Gympie	1916	1996	approx 26.0232°S 152.0439°E	Located on Planted Creek Road.
Taromeo Soldiers' Settlement State School	East Nanango	South Burnett	1934	1944	approx 26.69400°S 152.03489°E	Despite the name, the school was on the northern side of Greenwood Creek Road in present-day East Nanango.
Taromeo State School	Taromeo	South Burnett	1909	1942	approx 26.8431°S 152.16379°E	On the eastern side of Old Esk Road.
Tellebang State School	Tellebang	North Burnett	1931	1965	25.04234°S 151.23207°E	Located on a triangular site south of the intersection of the Burnett Highway and Turners Road. A sign facing the highway marks the site.
Thinoomba Provisional School	Thinoomba	Fraser Coast	1898	1925	25.61116°S 152.45609°E	Located on the eastern side of Thinoomba Road.
Three Moon State School	Three Moon	North Burnett	1927	1948	approx 24.91244°S 151.12945°E	Located to the east of the Three Moon railway station.
Tirroan State School	Tirroan	Bundaberg	1885	1956	approx 25.02277°S 151.92454°E	Opened 1885 as Watawa Provisional School, renamed 1908 Tirroan Provisional School, became Tirroan State School in 1909. It was on the eastern side of St Kilda Road.
Toogoom State School	Toogoom	Fraser Coast	1918	1939	approx 25.2493°S 152.6658°E	Located on Toogoom Road.
Traveston State School	Traveston	Gympie	1896	1967	approx 26.3213°S 152.7735°E	Previously known as Traveston Siding Provisional/State School. Located on Traveston Road immediately south of the junction with Tandur Traveston Road.
Tureen State School	near Pimpimbudgee	South Burnett	1915	1925		
Ventnor State School	Ventnor	North Burnett	1946	1960	24.9104°S 151.2866°E	Also known as Yarrol Road State School. Located at 1877 Yarrol Road. Listed on the Queensland Heritage Register.
Walluma State School	North Gregory	Bundaberg	1900	1912	approx 25.0744°S 152.2748°E	Gregory Provisional School opened on 9 July 1900. The school became Walluma Provisional School in 1904 and then Walluma State School in 1909 and closed approximately 1912. Located at 496 Foleys Road.
Warrawee State School	Upper Glastonbury	Gympie Region	1936	1975	26.27647°S 152.49765°E	Located at 821 Glastonbury Creek Road.
Watalgan State School	Watalgan	Bundaberg	1927	1963	approx 24.64488°S 152.02613°E	The school's land parcel no longer exists due to the realignment of the North Coast railway line in 1996.
Watchbox State School	Boonara	Gympie	1936	1967	26.0662°S 152.0137°E	The school was on a 3-acre (1.2 ha) site on the southern side of Watchbox Road.
Waterloo State School	Waterloo	Bundaberg	circa 1937	1955	24.7467°S 152.0063°E	Located on Waterloo Hall Road.
Wattle Grove State School	Wattle Grove	South Burnett	1915	1963	26.57614°S 151.69649°E	Located on a 3-acre (1.2 ha) site at 754 Wooden Hut Road (north-east corner of Wattlegrove Road).
Welcome Creek State School	Welcome Creek	Bundaberg	1931	2003	24.7697°S 152.2792°E	Located at 669 Moore Park Road (24.7697°S 152.2792°E).
Wengenville State School	Wengenville	South Burnett	1926	1962	26.83813°S 151.69908°E	Originally opened as Maidenwell (Anderson's Mill) Provisional School. Name was changed to Wengenville in 1934. Located at 3 Wengen Creek Road (eastern corner with Maidenwell Bunya Mountains Road).
Wetheron State School	Wetheron	North Burnett	1916	1963	25.54631°S 151.71999°E	Located on John Street.
Whitebridge State School	North Isis	Bundaberg	1915	1921	25.20684°S 152.27653°E	Located at 292 North Isis Road.
Wilson Valley State School	Wilson Valley	North Burnett	1916	1944	25.55058°S 151.83853°E	Located on Fowlers Road.
Wilson's Pocket State School	Wilsons Pocket	Gympie	1924	1962	26.13185°S 152.80630°E	Located at approx 718 Wilsons Pocket Road.
Wonga Lower State School	Lower Wonga	Gympie	1914	1968		
Wonga Upper State School	Widgee	Gympie	1914	1959		
Woongalee State School	Moonford	North Burnett	1929	circa 1943	approx 24.71720°S 151.04697°E	Located on the western side of Cania Road.
Woocoo State School	Woocoo	Fraser Coast	1901	1961		
Woodmillar State School	Woodmillar	North Burnett	1915	1960	25.67072°S 151.57118°E	Located at 8 Langs Road.
Wooroolin West State School	Wooroolin	South Burnett	1929	1949		
Wooroonden State School	Wooroonden	South Burnett	1918	1963	26.11912°S 151.75704°E	Wooroon State School opened in 1917. In 1919, the spelling was changed to Woroon State School. In 1925, it was renamed Woroonden State School. It closed in 1963. It was on the north-western corner of Webbers Bridge Road and Bradleys Road. As at 2011, the school building was still extant and the site has been renamed Hughie Campbell Memorial Park.
Wungoolba (Fraser Island) State School	Fraser Island	Fraser Coast	1918	1921		May have been a Provisional school. Needs further research.
Yandaran Creek State School	Yandaran	Bundaberg	1886	1957		
Yengarie State School	Yengarie	Fraser Coast	1868	1963	25.55534°S 152.61673°E	Located at 340 Old Mill Road.
Yerra State School	Yerra	Fraser Coast	1912	1974	approx 25.6075°S 152.5362°E	Located on a 2-acre (0.81 ha) site donated by W. Day within a "few hundred yards" from the railway station.

== Private schools ==
=== Catholic schools ===
In Queensland, Catholic primary schools are usually (but not always) linked to a parish. Prior to the 1970s, most schools were founded by religious institutes, but with the decrease in membership of these institutes, together with major reforms inside the church, lay teachers and administrators began to take over the schools, a process which completed by approximately 1990.

Within the region, most schools are administered by the Catholic Education Office, Archdiocese of Brisbane, but those in Bundaberg and Monto are administered by the CEO, Diocese of Rockhampton. Both are supported by the Queensland Catholic Education Commission, which is responsible for coordinating administration, curriculum and policy across the Catholic school system. Preference for enrolment is given to Catholic students from the parish or local area, although non-Catholic students are admitted if room is available.

Name	Suburb	LGA	M/F/Co-ed	Years	Opened	Coords	Notes
Gympie Flexible Learning Centre	Gympie	Gympie	Co-ed	7–12	2006		Alternative, Operated by Edmund Rice Foundation.
Shalom Catholic College	Norville	Bundaberg	Co-ed	7–12	1984		Amalgamation of the Christian Brothers College for boys and Loyola College for girls. At 9 Fitzgerald Street.
St Joseph's Catholic Primary School	Bundaberg Central	Bundaberg	Co-ed	P–6	1876	24.8681°S 152.3500°E	At the corner of Barolin and Woondooma Streets .
St Joseph's School	Childers	Bundaberg	Co-ed	P–6	1926	25.2359°S 152.2811°E	At 40 Churchill Street.
St Joseph's School	Gayndah	North Burnett	Co-ed	P–6	1919	25.6233°S 151.6054°E	At 38 Meson Street.
St Joseph's School	Murgon	South Burnett	Co-ed	P–6	1937	26.2394°S 151.9462°E	At 32 Angel Avenue.
St Mary's Catholic College	Kingaroy	South Burnett	Co-ed	P–12	1990	26.5346°S 151.8419°E	Amalgamation of earlier schools. At 10 Kent Street.
St Mary's Catholic Primary School	Avenell Heights	Bundaberg	Co-ed	P–6	1952		
St Mary's College	Maryborough	Fraser Coast	Co-ed	7–12	1983		
St Mary's Primary School	Maryborough	Fraser Coast	Co-ed	P–6	1880		
St Patrick's College	Gympie	Gympie	Co-ed	7–12	1985		Amalgamation of CBC and St Patrick's Convent High School
St Patrick's Primary School	Bundaberg West	Bundaberg	Co-ed	P–6	1937		
St Patrick's Primary School	Gympie	Gympie	Co-ed	P–6	1968		
St Patrick's Primary School	Nanango	South Burnett	Co-ed	P–6	1912	26.6725°S 151.9969°E	At 16 Alfred Street.
St Therese's Catholic Primary School	Monto	North Burnett	Co-ed	P–6	1940	24.8666°S 151.1214°E	At 2–10 Rayleigh Street.
Star of the Sea Catholic School	Torquay	Fraser Coast	Co-ed	P–6	1984	25.3069°S 152.8739°E	At Hughes Road.
Xavier Catholic College	Hervey Bay	Fraser Coast	Co-ed	P–12	2003		

=== Independent schools ===
Most independent schools cater for students from preparatory to year 12.

Name	Suburb	LGA	M/F/Co-ed	Years	Category	Opened	Coords	Notes
Bayside Christian College	Urraween	Fraser Coast	Co-ed	P–12	Christian	1993	25.2986°S 152.8153°E	Formerly Hervey Bay Christian Academy. At 171 Pantlins Lane.
Bundaberg Christian College	Windermere	Bundaberg	Co-ed	P–12	Christian	1996		
Burnett Youth Learning Centre	Elliott	Bundaberg	Co-ed	7-12	Special	2006		Special needs, secondary
Carinity Education	Nikenbah	Fraser Coast	Co-ed	6–12	Baptist	2002		Alternative
Cooloola Christian College	Southside	Gympie	Co-ed	P–12	Christian	1992	26.1981°S 152.6421°E	At 1 College Road.
Fraser Coast Anglican College	Wondunna	Fraser Coast	Co-ed	P–12	Anglican	1995		
Hope Adventist School	Bundaberg North	Bundaberg	Co-ed	P–6	Adventist	1983	24.8530°S 152.3314°E	Formerly Bundaberg Adventist School and Coral Coast Christian School. At 18 Walters Street.
Impact Community ACADEMY	Bundaberg North	Bundaberg	Co-ed			2025		
Mawarra Independent School	Kybong	Gympie	Co-ed	P–10	Independent	2020	26.25926°S 152.70705°E	At 889–967 Old Bruce Highway.
OneSchool Global (Maryborough campus)	St Helens	Fraser Coast	Co-ed	3–12	Plymouth Brethren Christian Church	2003	25.49593°S 152.7085°E	Formerly known as the Agnew School. At 19 Fazio Street.
Riverside Christian College	Maryborough West	Fraser Coast	Co-ed	P–12	Christian	1983		Formerly Maryborough Christian Academy
Silver Lining School	Ficks Crossing	South Burnett	Co-ed		Aboriginal			
St James Lutheran College	Urraween	Fraser Coast	Co-ed	P–12	Lutheran	2003	25.2980°S 152.8137°E	At 138–172 Pantlins Lane.
St John's Lutheran Primary School	Bundaberg South	Bundaberg	Co-ed	P–6	Lutheran	1978		
St John's Lutheran School	Kingaroy	South Burnett	Co-ed	P–12	Lutheran	1989	26.5376°S 151.8552°E	At 84–94 Ivy Street.
St. Luke's Anglican School	Kalkie	Bundaberg	Co-ed	P–12	Anglican	1994		
Tom Quinn Community Centre Alternative School	Bundaberg	Bundaberg	Co-ed	7–10	Salvation Army			
Victory College	Araluen	Gympie	Co-ed	K–12	Pentecostal	1980	26.1625°S 152.6626°E	At 173 Old Maryborough Road. It is operated by the Victory Church (formerly the Gympie Christian Outreach Centre), which is affiliated with the International Network of Churches.

=== Defunct private schools ===
Name	Suburb	LGA	Category	Opened	Closed	Notes
Agnew School (Bundaberg Campus)	Bundaberg South	Bundaberg	Exclusive Brethren	2003	2014	Located in Boundary Street, 2003–2006; Located at 669 Moore Park Road in 2006–2014, site of the former Welcome School State School. The school website was archived.
Our Lady Help of Christians Christian Brothers College	Bundaberg	Bundaberg	Catholic boys'	1919	1983	Amalgamated with Loyola College (Catholic girls) into Shalom Catholic College.
Little Flower Christian Brothers College	Gympie	Gympie	Catholic boys'	1899	1984	Merged into St Patrick's College
Sacred Heart Christian Brothers College	Maryborough	Fraser Coast	Catholic boys'	1888	1978	Absorbed into St Mary's College
Christian Family College	Gympie	Gympie	Assemblies of God	1983	1988	
Holy Spirit School	Bundaberg	Bundaberg	Catholic primary	1959	1981	Absorbed into St Mary's
Kingaroy Christian College	Kingaroy	South Burnett	Ind. Christian	1984	1999	
Maryborough Boys' Grammar School	Maryborough	Fraser Coast	Independent	1881	1936	On Kent Street (the current site of Maryborough State High School). The school closed during the Great Depression and was taken over by the Queensland Government and reopened as the Maryborough State High and Intermediate School for Boys. Listed on the Queensland Heritage Register.
Maryborough Girls' Grammar School	Maryborough	Fraser Coast	Independent	1883	1936	On Kent Street opposite Maryborough Boy's Grammar School (the current site of Maryborough State High School). The school closed during the Great Depression and was taken over by the Queensland Government and reopened as the Maryborough State High and Intermediate School for Girls.
Mount Coora Private School	Kilkivan, Queensland	Gympie	Independent	early 1870s	c.1876	Operated privately at the Mount Coora mine settlement. Sabina Page was a teacher here in 1875–1876. She opened the first Kilkivan State School which was known then as the Neureum Provisional School in 1877.
Rosary College	Murgon, Queensland	South Burnett	Catholic secondary	1943	1970	
Pinbarren Community Christian College	Pinbarren	Sunshine Coast	Independent Christian	2003	2009	
St John the Baptist Primary School	Wondai, Queensland	South Burnett	Catholic	1954	1969	
St Joseph's School	Monkland	Gympie	Catholic primary	1872	1938	
Saint Mary's Parish Primary School	Kingaroy	South Burnett	Catholic primary	1929	1990	Merged into Saint Mary's Catholic College
Saint Mary's Parish Secondary School	Kingaroy	South Burnett	Catholic	1964	1990	Merged into Saint Mary's Catholic College
St Patrick's Convent High School	Gympie	Gympie	Catholic girls'	1916	1984	Merged into St Patrick's College
St Patrick's Convent High School	Bundaberg	Bundaberg	Catholic girls'	1915	1983	Renamed Loyola College in 1981. Amalgamated in 1984 with Our Lady Help of Christians Christian Brothers College (Catholic boys) into Shalom Catholic College.

== See also ==
- List of schools in Queensland
