= South Bingera, Queensland =

South Bingera Bundaberg, Queensland
- Coordinates: 24.9686°S 152.2191°E
- Population: 674 (2021 census)
  - Density: 27.29/km^{2} (70.67/sq mi)
- Postcode(s): 4670
- Area: 24.7 km^{2} (9.5 sq mi)
- Time zone: AEST (UTC+10:00)
- Location: 18.7 km (12 mi) SW of Bundaberg CBD; 348 km (216 mi) N of Brisbane
- LGA(s): Bundaberg Region
- State electorate(s): Burnett
- Federal division(s): Hinkler
Suburbs around South Bingera:
South Kolan	South Kolan	Branyan
South Kolan	South Bingera	Elliott
Pine Creek	Pine Creek	Elliott

South Bingera is a rural residential locality in the Bundaberg Region, Queensland, Australia. In the 2021 census, South Bingera had a population of 674 people.

== Geography ==
South Bingera is 16 kilometres (9.9 mi) south-west of Bundaberg on the Isis Highway.

The locality is bounded to the west and north by the Burnett River and to the east by the Isis Highway (also known as Childers Road). The terrain varies from 10 to 70 metres (33 to 230 ft) above sea level.

Historically Bingera Crossing is a ford over the Burnett River (24.95°S 152.2166°E), but it is unlikely to be used now as there is a bridge on Cedars Road over the river (24.9740°S 152.1847°E).

The rural residential areas are mostly in the east near Childers Road with the areas closer to the river mostly used for agriculture. As the locality is not very flat, there is only a small amount of sugarcane (the main crop of the wider area) being grown with more emphasis on other crops and grazing on native vegetation.

== History ==
The name Bingera is believed to be derived from the Kabi language word meaning bony bream (a fish).

In 1887, 19,840 acres (8,030 ha) of land were resumed from the Bingera pastoral run. The land was offered for selection for the establishment of small farms on 17 April 1887.

The Bingera Provisional School opened on 6 March 1893. In 1909 it became Bingera State School. In 1911, it was renamed Bingera South State School. The school closed about 1 December 1965. The school was at 152 South Bingera Road (24.8975°S 152.1929°E), now just within the boundaries of neighbouring Pine Creek.

== Demographics ==
At the 2011 census, South Bingera had a population of 590 people.

In the 2016 census, South Bingera had a population of 661 people.

In the 2021 census, South Bingera had a population of 674 people.

== Education ==
The Shalom Catholic College based in Bundaberg West has an 85 hectares (210 acres) site at South Bingera, used for outdoor activities and environmental education.

There are no conventional schools in South Bingera. The nearest government primary schools are Branyan Road State School in neighbouring Branyan to the north-east, Kolan South State School in neighbouring South Kolan to the north, and Givelda State School in Givelda to the west. The nearest government secondary school is Bundaberg State High School in Bundaberg South to the north-east.
