= Promisedland, Queensland =

Promisedland
- Suburb
- Interactive map of Promisedland
- Coordinates: 25.1025°S 152.1622°E
- Country: Australia
- State: Queensland
- LGA: Bundaberg Region
- Location: 28.0 km (17.4 mi) NW of Childers; 34.4 km (21.4 mi) SE of Gin Gin; 38.0 km (23.6 mi) SW of Bundaberg; 335 km (208 mi) NNW of Brisbane

Government
  - State electorate: Burnett
  - Federal division: Hinkler

Area
  - Total: 70.3 km^{2} (27.1 sq mi)

Population
  - Total: 34 (2021 census)
  - Density: 0.484/km^{2} (1.253/sq mi)
- Time zone: UTC+10:00 (AEST)
- Postcode: 4660
Suburbs around Promisedland
Bungadoo; Electra	Pine Creek	Elliott
Duingal	Promisedland	Gregory River
Duingal	Booyal	Cordalba

Promisedland is a rural locality in the Bundaberg Region, Queensland, Australia. In the 2021 census, Promisedland had a population of 34 people.

== Geography ==
The Burnett River forms the north-western boundary of the locality. The Ned Churchward Weir (originally called the Walla Weir) was built in 1998 across the river between Promisedland and Bungadoo to provide water for irrigation.

Most of the locality is state forests with sections of the Cordalba State Forest to be found from the north-west to the south-east of the locality with the Elliot River State Forest in the east of the localilty. Apart from these protected areas, the land use in the south-west of the locality is irrigated horticulture, while the other parts of the locality are used for grazing on native vegetation.

== Demographics ==
In the 2016 census, Promisedland had a population of 29 people.

In the 2021 census, Promisedland had a population of 34 people.

== Education ==
There are no schools in Promisedland. The nearest government primary schools are Cordalba State School in neighbouring Cordalba to the south-east and Givelda State School in Givelda to the north. The nearest government secondary schools are Isis District State High School in Childers to the south-east, Gin Gin State High School in Gin Gin to the north-west, and Bundaberg State High School in Bundaberg South.
