= Elliott, Queensland =

Elliott Bundaberg, Queensland
- Coordinates: 25.0047°S 152.2780°E
- Population: 156 (2021 census)
  - Density: 1.077/km^{2} (2.790/sq mi)
- Postcode(s): 4670
- Area: 144.8 km^{2} (55.9 sq mi)
- Time zone: AEST (UTC+10:00)
- Location: 19.0 km (12 mi) S of Bundaberg CBD; 40.1 km (25 mi) NNE of Childers; 346 km (215 mi) N of Brisbane
- LGA(s): Bundaberg Region
- State electorate(s): Burnett
- Federal division(s): Hinkler
Suburbs around Elliott:
South Bingera	Branyan; Kensington	Alloway
Pine Creek	Elliott	Kinkuna
Promisedland; Gregory River	North Gregory	Goodwood

Elliott is a rural locality in the Bundaberg Region, Queensland, Australia. In the 2021 census, Elliott had a population of 156 people.

== Geography ==
The locality is bounded in part by the Childers Road to the west and by Goodwood Road to the east.

The Springs is a neighbourhood in the north of the locality (24.95°S 152.2666°E)

The Elliott River rises in the west of the locality (25.00787°S 152.21410°E) and flows east, forming part of the boundary with Alloway and exiting the locality. The river flows into the Coral Sea at Elliott Heads.

Several large areas of the locality are within the Elliott River State Forest which extends into neighbouring Gregory River and Promisedland to the south-west.

Other large areas are within the Bingera National Park and the Bingera Conservation Parks (1 and 2). These parks seek to protect coastal plant communities, the waterholes along Mahogany Creek and an important habitat corridor. Although open to the public, the parks do not have visitor facilities as they are intended to be natural places and therefore only suitable for "self-reliant" visitors.

The remainder of the locality is used for agriculture, mostly growing sugarcane with some grazing on native vegetation. There is a network of cane tramways in the locality to transport the harvested sugarcane to the Isis Central sugar mill.

== History ==
The locality is named after the Elliott River, which in turn is named after pastoralist and politician Gilbert Eliott (albeit with a slightly different spelling).

Elliott State School opened on 4 February 1886 and it is believed there was a "school at Bingera and Baranyan Homestead near Bundaberg" on the site prior to this. In 1960, it was renamed Alloway State School. It is now within the boundaries of the suburb of Alloway.

The Bundaberg Soaring Club (now the Bundaberg Gliding Club) was established in 1965.

The Bingera National Park was gazetted in 2006. The two Bingera Conservation Parks were gazette in 2010.

== Demographics ==
In the 2016 census, Elliott had a population of 138 people.

In the 2021 census, Elliott had a population of 156 people.

== Education ==
Burnett Youth Learning Centre is a private secondary (7-12) school for boys and girls at 3693 Goodwood Road (25.0075°S 152.3763°E). In 2018, the school had an enrolment of 49 students with 10 teachers (9 full-time equivalent) and 8 non-teaching staff (5 full-time equivalent). Operating on a 28.3-hectare (70-acre) site, this Christian school provides individual programs for children who have disengaged from mainstream education, with a strong focus on developing vocational skills in farming, mechanical repairs, and hospitality.

There are no government schools in Elliott. The nearest government primary school are Alloway State School in neighbouring Alloway to the north-west, Branyan Road State School to neighbouring Branyan to the north, Givelda State School in Givelda to the west. The nearest government secondary schools are Bundaberg State High School in Bundaberg South and Isis District State High School in Childers to the south.

== Amenities ==
The Bundaberg Gliding Club operate their flights from an airfield off Childers Road in Bingera Conservation Park 1 in the west of the locality (25.0508°S 152.2260°E).
