= Electra, Queensland =

Electra
- Suburb
- Interactive map of Electra
- Coordinates: 25.0036°S 152.1152°E
- Country: Australia
- State: Queensland
- LGA: Bundaberg Region
- Location: 33.6 km (20.9 mi) SW of Bundaberg CBD; 351 km (218 mi) N of Brisbane

Government
  - State electorate: Burnett
  - Federal division: Hinkler

Area
  - Total: 27.2 km^{2} (10.5 sq mi)

Population
  - Total: 103 (2021 census)
  - Density: 3.787/km^{2} (9.81/sq mi)
- Time zone: UTC+10:00 (AEST)
- Postcode: 4670
Suburbs around Electra
| Bungadoo | South Kolan | Givelda |
| Bungadoo | Electra | Givelda |
| Bungadoo | Promisedland | Pine Creek |

Electra is a rural locality in the Bundaberg Region, Queensland, Australia. In the 2021 census, Electra had a population of 103 people.

== History ==
Electra Provisional School opened on 12 October 1892 and closed in 1966. On 1 January 1909, it became Electra State School. It closed in 1918. Electra State School reopened in 1936, closing permanently in 1966. The school building was relocated to Airy Park State School (later renamed Elliot Heads State School) in Elliott Heads.

Woodbine State School opened in 1909 and closed circa 1914.

== Demographics ==
In the 2016 census, Electra had a population of 111 people.

In the 2021 census, Electra had a population of 103 people.

== Education ==
There are no schools in Electra. The nearest government primary school is Givelda State School in neighbouring Givelda to the east. The nearest government secondary school is Bundaberg State High School in Bundaberg South to the north-east.
