= Branyan, Queensland =

Branyan
- Suburb
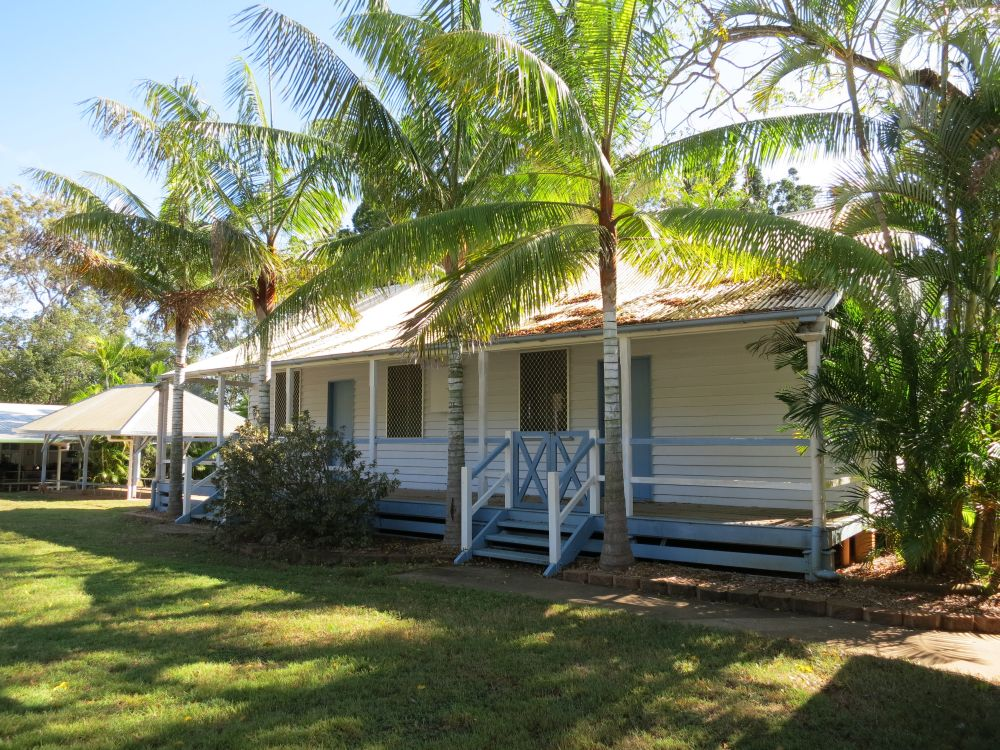
- Heritage-listed Branyan Road State School building, 2014

- Interactive map of Branyan
- Coordinates: 24.9177°S 152.2647°E
- Country: Australia
- State: Queensland
- City: Bundaberg
- LGA: Bundaberg Region
- Location: 12.0 km (7.5 mi) SW of Bundaberg CBD; 364 km (226 mi) N of Brisbane

Government
  - State electorates: Bundaberg; Burnett
  - Federal division: Hinkler

Area
  - Total: 34.8 km^{2} (13.4 sq mi)

Population
  - Total: 4,660 (2021 census)
  - Density: 133.9/km^{2} (346.8/sq mi)
- Time zone: UTC+10:00 (AEST)
- Postcode: 4670
Suburbs around Branyan
Sharon	Sharon	Avoca
South Kolan	Branyan	Kensington
South Bingera	Elliott	Elliott

Branyan is a rural locality in the Bundaberg Region, Queensland, Australia. In the 2021 census, Branyan had a population of 4,660 people.

== History ==
Branyan Road Provisional School opened on 14 April 1905. On 1 January 1909 it became Branyan Road State School, Branyan Road State School became Independent Public School in 2016.

In 2011, the Wide Bay Burnett Regional Plan identified Branyan, then a predominantly rural area, as a growth area for residential purposes.

== Demographics ==
In the 2011 census, Branyan had a population of 3,339 people.

In the 2016 census, Branyan had a population of 4,134 people.

In the 2021 census, Branyan had a population of 4,660 people.

== Education ==
Branyan Road State School is a government primary (Prep-6) school for boys and girls at 430 Branyan Drive (24.8927°S 152.2938°E). In 2018, the school had an enrolment of 444 students with 33 teachers (27 full-time equivalent) and 16 non-teaching staff (11 full-time equivalent).

There are no secondary schools in Branyan. The nearest government secondary school is Bundaberg State High School in Bundaberg South to the north-east.

== Heritage listings ==
There are a number of heritage-listed sites in Branyan, including:

- Branyan Road State School, 430 Branyan Drive
