= Pine Creek, Queensland =

Pine Creek
- Suburb
- Interactive map of Pine Creek
- Coordinates: 25.0338°S 152.1688°E
- Country: Australia
- State: Queensland
- LGA: Bundaberg Region
- Location: 26.1 km (16.2 mi) SW of Bundaberg CBD; 347 km (216 mi) N of Brisbane

Government
  - State electorate: Burnett
  - Federal division: Hinkler

Area
  - Total: 46.7 km^{2} (18.0 sq mi)

Population
  - Total: 258 (2021 census)
  - Density: 5.525/km^{2} (14.31/sq mi)
- Time zone: UTC+10:00 (AEST)
- Postcode: 4670
Suburbs around Pine Creek
Givelda	South Kolan	South Bingera
Electra	Pine Creek	Elliott
Promisedland	Gregory River	Elliott

Pine Creek is a rural locality in the Bundaberg Region, Queensland, Australia. In the 2021 census, Pine Creek had a population of 258 people.

== Geography ==
The Burnett River forms a small part of the northern boundary of the locality. To the north-east, the locality is bounded by Childers Road and by Philips Road to the east and south-east.

Bingera South is a neighbourhood in the north-east of the locality (25.0000°S 152.1833°E).

The south-west of the locality is within Cordalba State Forest which extends into neighbouring Promisedland. Apart from the protected area, the land use is predominantly grazing on native vegetation with some cropping, including growing sugarcane in the east of the locality.

== History ==
The Bingera Provisional School opened on 6 March 1893. In 1909 it became Bingera State School. In 1911, it was renamed Bingera South State School. The school closed about 1 December 1965. The school was at 152 South Bingera Road (24.8975°S 152.1929°E) within the present-day boundaries of Pine Creek.

== Demographics ==
In the 2016 census, Pine Creek had a population of 254 people.

In the 2021 census, Pine Creek had a population of 258 people.

== Education ==
There are no schools in Pine Creek. The nearest government primary school is Givelda State School in neighbouring Givelda to the north-west. The nearest government secondary school is Bundaberg State High School in Bundaberg South, Bundaberg to the north-east.
