= Bungadoo =

- Suburb
- Interactive map of Bungadoo
- Coordinates: 24.9955°S 152.0844°E
- Country: Australia
- State: Queensland
- LGA: Bundaberg Region
- Location: 18.8 km (11.7 mi) E of Gin Gin; 38.3 km (23.8 mi) WSW of Bundaberg; 369 km (229 mi) N of Brisbane

Government
  - State electorate: Callide
  - Federal division: Flynn

Area
  - Total: 29.9 km^{2} (11.5 sq mi)

Population
  - Total: 342 (2021 census)
  - Density: 11.44/km^{2} (29.62/sq mi)
- Time zone: UTC+10:00 (AEST)
- Postcode: 4671
Suburbs around Bungadoo
Bullyard	Bucca	South Kolan
Delan	Bungadoo	Electra
Duingal	Promisedland	Promisedland

Bungadoo is a rural locality in the Bundaberg Region, Queensland, Australia. The area was formerly known as Albionville. In the 2021 census, Bungadoo had a population of 342 people.

== Geography ==
The Burnett River forms the southern and eastern boundary of the locality. The Ned Churchward Weir (originally called the Walla Weir) was built in 1998 across the river between Bungadoo and Promisedland to provide water for irrigation.

The Goondoon railway station is in the north-eastern tip of the locality (24.9438°S 152.1027°E). It was the junction from the Mount Perry railway line to the Wallaville railway line, both of which are now closed.

Snake Creek is a neighbourhood in the north of the locality (24.9666°S 152.0833°E). It takes its name from the former Snake Creek railway station, which was named by the Queensland Railways Department on 4 September 1919 after a nearby creek.

== History ==
Albionville Provisional School opened in 1891. On 1 January 1909, it became Albionville State School. The school closed at 11 May 1962. It was south of the River Road (approx 24.9906°S 152.0786°E).

== Demographics ==
In the 2016 census, Bungadoo had a population of 315 people.

In the 2021 census, Bungadoo had a population of 342 people.

== Education ==
There are no schools in Bungadoo. The nearest government primary school is Bullyard State School in neighbouring Bullyard to the north-west. The nearest government secondary school is Gin Gin State High School in Gin Gin to the west.
