= South Kolan =

- Town
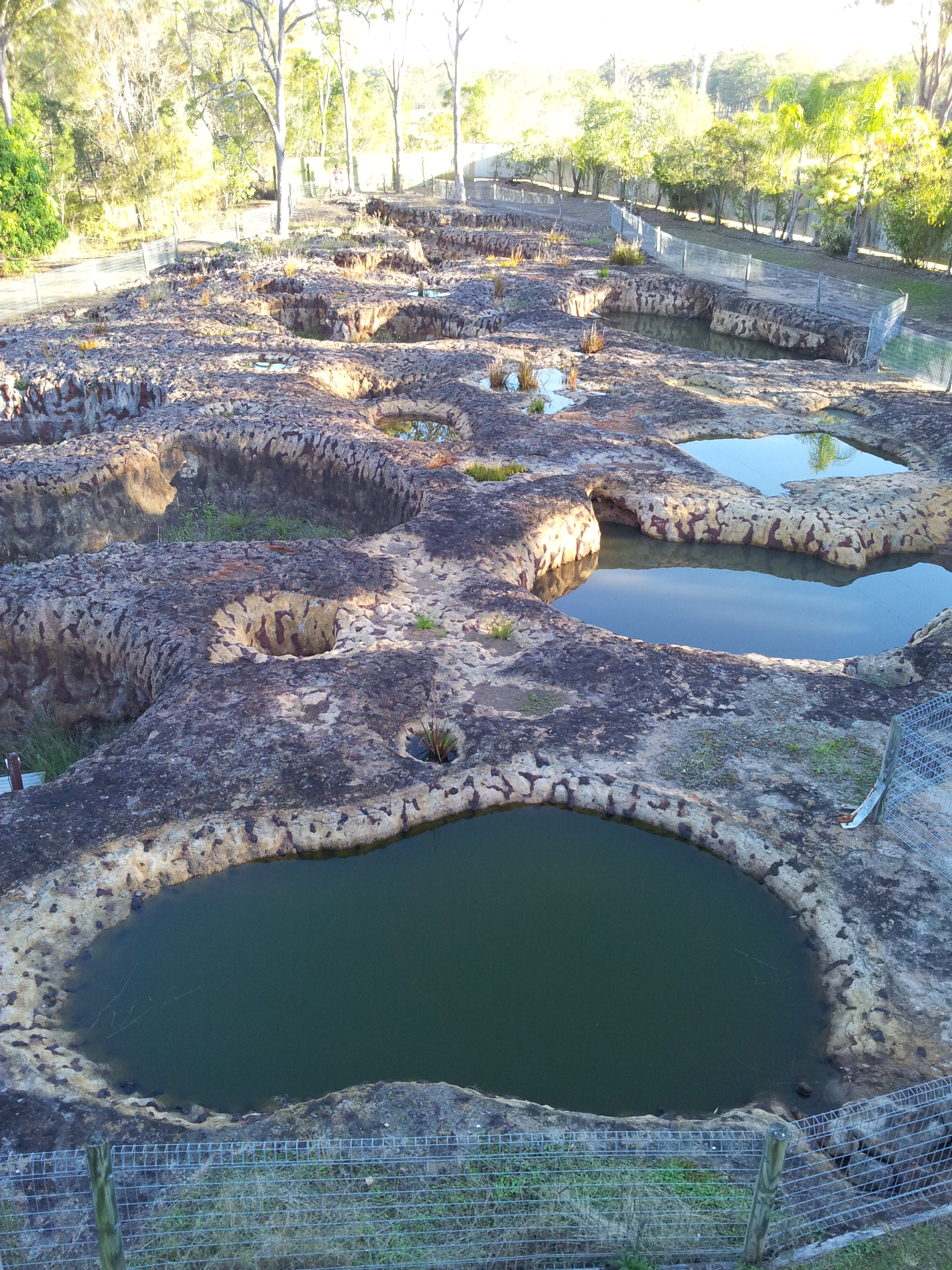
- Mystery Craters, 2013

- Interactive map of South Kolan
- Coordinates: 24.9280°S 152.1775°E
- Country: Australia
- State: Queensland
- LGA: Bundaberg Region
- Location: 22.0 km (13.7 mi) WSW of Bundaberg; 27.8 km (17.3 mi) ENE of Gin Gin; 355 km (221 mi) N of Brisbane

Government
  - State electorate: Burnett
  - Federal division: Flynn

Area
  - Total: 113.7 km^{2} (43.9 sq mi)

Population
  - Total: 1,258 (2021 census)
  - Density: 11.064/km^{2} (28.656/sq mi)
- Time zone: UTC+10:00 (AEST)
- Postcode: 4670
Localities around South Kolan
Bucca	Meadowvale	Sharon
Bucca	South Kolan	Branyan
Bungadoo; Electra	Givelda; Pine Creek	South Bingera

South Kolan /ˈkoʊlæn/ is a rural locality in the Bundaberg Region, Queensland, Australia. In the 2021 census, the locality of South Kolan had a population of 1,258 people.

== Geography ==
The South Kolan region is in the Wide Bay–Burnett region,354 kilometres (220 mi) north of the state capital Brisbane and 23 kilometres (14 mi) south west of the regional city of Bundaberg. The Burnett River flows through the locality.

The neighbourhood of Birthamba is located in the north-eastern area of South Kolan (24.9166°S 152.1833°E); it takes its name from the former Birthamba railway station on the now closed Mount Perry railway line. Birthamba is an Aboriginal word meaning camp.

The former neighbourhood of Kalbar is located in the eastern area of South Kolan (24.940°S 152.247°E). Kalbar Road still bears the name. It is located in the bend of the Burnett River opposite South Bingera / Branyan. (This is not to be confused with the town of Kalbar (formerly Engelsburg) in the Scenic Rim Region).

The neighbourhood of Koolboo is located in the north-western area of South Kolan (24.9166°S 152.1500°E); it takes its name from the former Kooboo railway station on the now closed Mount Perry railway line. Koolboo is named after a local Aboriginal clan leader.

The Bundaberg-Gin Gin Road (State Route 3) runs through from east to west, and The Cedars Road exits to the south.

== History ==
The name Kolan is believed to be a Kabi language word kalang meaning good.

Kolan South State School opened on 29 July 1878.

In 1882, a Methodist church was established in South Kolan in the area known as Hill End. In 1903, it was replaced by a new building which was subsequently enlarged.

Kalbar Plantation was owned by Dr May of Bundaberg; a sugar mill was erected there in 1883.

A Union church was opened in 1884 and has been used by a number of denominations.

Kalbar Provisional School opened on 26 February 1896. On 1 January 1909, it became Kalbar State School. It closed on 15 June 1962.

The Bingera Railway Station Provisional School opened in 1907, becoming a State School in 1909. It closed in 1963. It was in James Street (approx 24.8976°S 152.1940°E). The name refers to the nearby (former) Bingera railway station on the now-closed Mount Perry railway line, which was at the intersection of Raines Road and Ten Mile Road (24.9048°S 152.1992°E).

St Mary's Anglican Church was dedicated on 11 March 1979 by Archbishop Felix Arnott. It closed during 1994.

Many properties damaged by the 2010-2011 Queensland floods and 2013 floods, which saw extensive repairs and adjustments made to the approaches of the Cedars Road Bridge Crossing.

== Demographics ==
In the 2011 census, South Kolan had a population of 1,164.

In the 2016 census, South Kolan had a population of 1,061 people.

In the 2021 census, South Kolan had a population of 1,258 people.

== Economy ==
Industry in the district consists of cattle farming, sugar cane production and milling, and commercial fruit and vegetable production. The township, although small, has a convenience store, Kolan South State Primary School, a police station and The South Kolan Pub which also has accommodation facilities. South Kolan is also frequented by many residents of surrounding rural areas such as Pine Creek and Gin Gin.

== Education ==
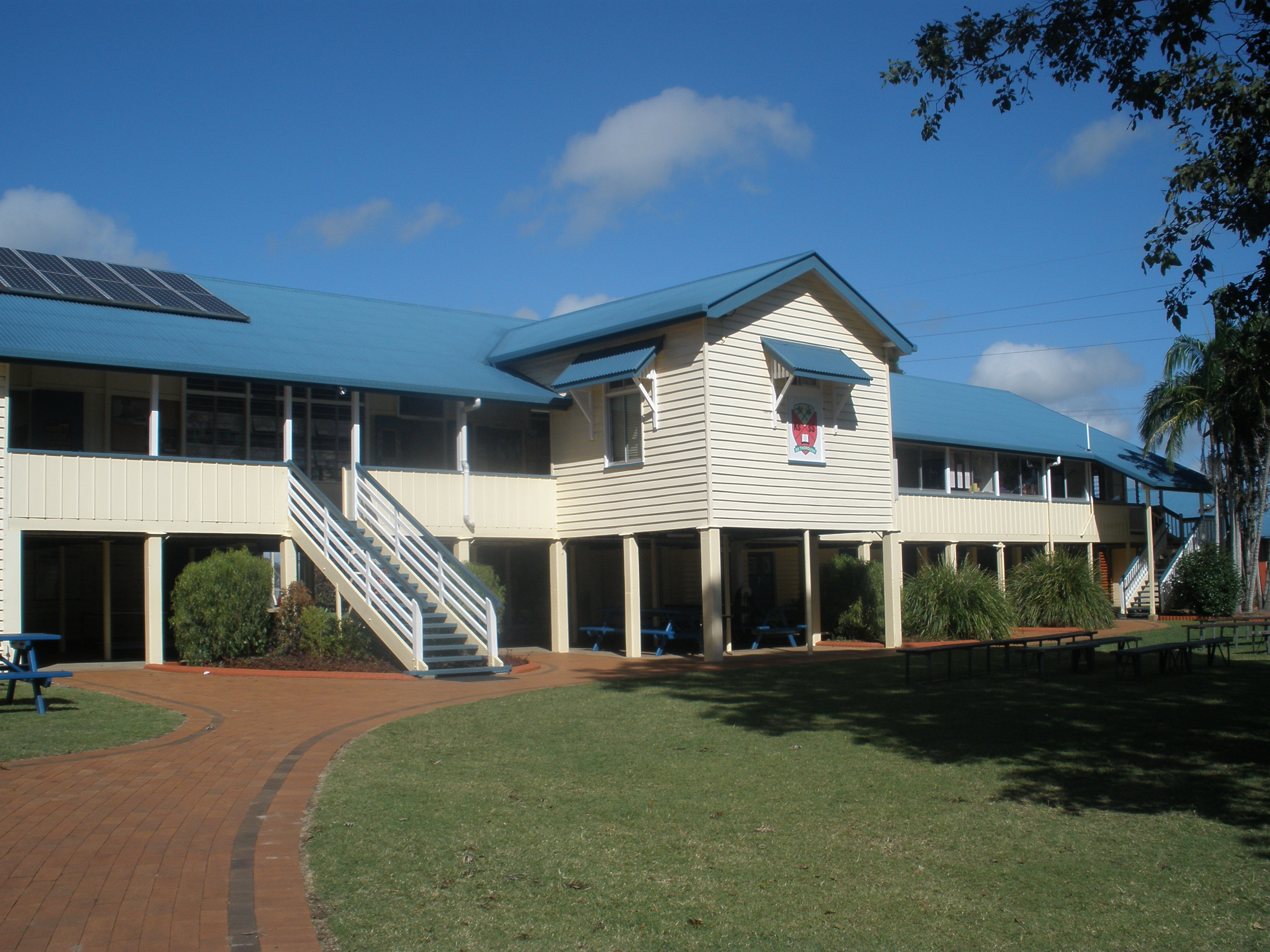
Koan South State School, 2012

Kolan South State School is a government primary (Prep-6) school for boys and girls at 2297 Gin Gin Road (24.9340°S 152.1760°E). In 2017, the school had an enrolment of 124 students with 7 teachers (6 full-time equivalent) and 7 non-teaching staff (4 full-time equivalent). In 2018, the school had an enrolment of 112 students with 7 teachers (6 full-time equivalent) and 8 non-teaching staff (4 full-time equivalent).

There are no secondary schools in South Kolan. The nearest government secondary schools are Bundaberg North State High School in Bundaberg North to the north-east and Gin Gin State High School in Gin Gin to the south-west.

== Attractions ==
South Kolan is home to the Mystery Craters. Discovered in 1971, the origin of the 35 oddly shaped craters has been the subject of controversy.

== Climate ==
South Kolan has a subtropical climate with wet, hot summers and mild winters.

== See also ==
- Bundaberg
- List of tramways in Queensland
