= Branyan Road State School =

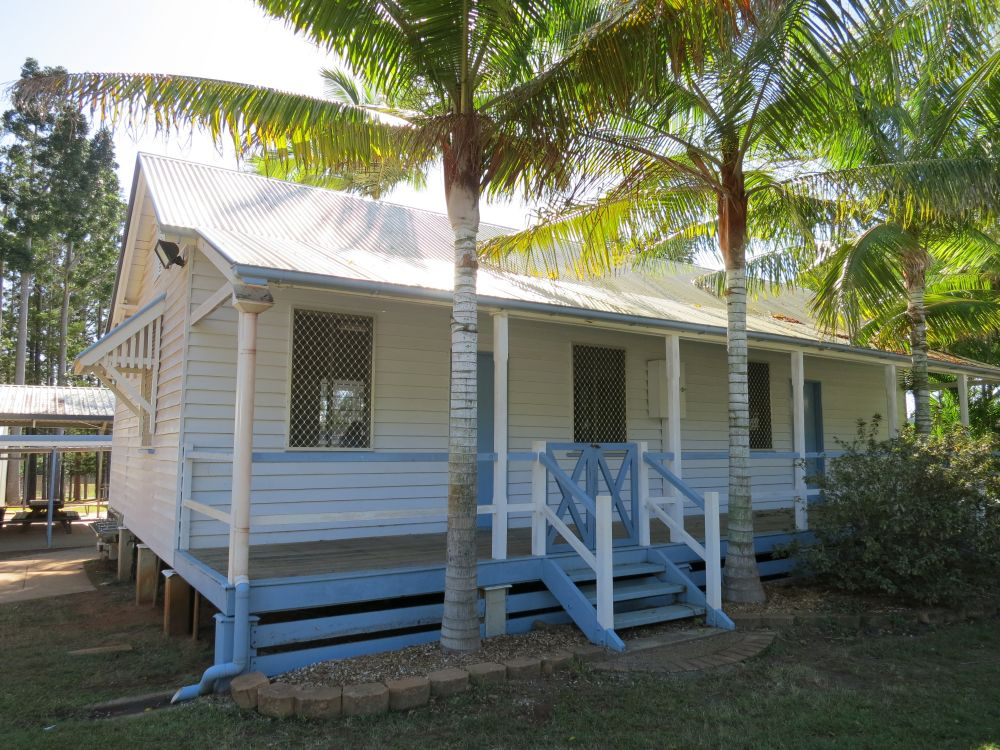
- Branyan Road State School, 2014

- Location within Queensland
- 24.8923°S 152.2930°E
- Location: 430 Branyan Drive, Branyan, Bundaberg, Bundaberg Region, Queensland, Australia

History
- Built: 1905 (Teaching building), 1914, 1947

Site notes
- Architect: Queensland Department of Public Works

Queensland Heritage Register
- Official name: Branyan Road State School
- Type: state heritage
- Designated: 1 May 2015
- Reference no.: 602852
- Type: Education, research, scientific facility: School-state
- Theme: Educating Queenslanders: Providing primary schooling

Branyan Road State School is a heritage-listed state school at 430 Branyan Drive, Branyan, Bundaberg, Bundaberg Region, Queensland, Australia. It was designed by Queensland Department of Public Works and built in 1905. It was added to the Queensland Heritage Register on 1 May 2015.

== History ==
Branyan Road State School, located southwest of Bundaberg, was opened in 1905 as Branyan Road Provisional School, and was upgraded to a state school in 1909. A playshed was added in 1914, while the original school building was extended with the addition of a similar building in the mid-1920s. The place is important in demonstrating the evolution of state education and its associated architecture in Queensland, and retains excellent examples standard of government designed school buildings that were an architectural response to prevailing government educational philosophies. Branyan Road State School also includes an impressive kauri pine tree (Agathis robusta), planted in 1914, and a c. 1947 forestry plot.

=== Education history ===
The provision of state-administered education was important to the colonial governments of Australia. The establishment of schools was considered an essential step in the development of early communities and integral to their success. Locals often donated land and labour for a school's construction and the school community contributed to maintenance and development. Schools became a community focus, a symbol of progress, and a source of pride, with enduring connections formed with past pupils, parents, and teachers.

A minimum of 30 pupils was necessary before the government would build a state school. From 1869, provisional schools could be established with as few as 15 (later 12) pupils. If the district or town developed, provisional schools were raised to state school status, with purpose-designed school buildings and teacher residences attracting better qualified and more experienced teachers. By 1908, 640 provisional schools were operating compared with 461 state schools.

To help ensure consistency and economy, the Queensland Government developed standard plans for its school buildings. From the 1860s until the 1960s, Queensland school buildings were predominantly timber-framed, an easy and cost-effective approach that also enabled the government to provide facilities in remote areas. Standard designs were continually refined in response to changing needs and educational philosophy and Queensland school buildings were particularly innovative in climate control, lighting, and ventilation. Standardisation produced distinctly similar schools across Queensland with complexes of typical components.

However, early provisional school buildings were not built to standard plans and many were of poor quality. Under regulations introduced in 1892 to address this situation, if a provisional school was built according to government specifications, the government would provide up to half the cost of the building and its furniture. The recommended government plan for provisional schools was for a small low-set timber framed and clad building with a gable roof. These were often a huge improvement over previous provisional school buildings and were constructed until c. 1910.

=== Branyan history ===
Branyan Road State School resulted from European settlement along the Burnett River. Traditionally the land of the Kalki people, the European presence in the Burnett area began with pastoralism in the 1840s and 1850s. Timber cutters arrived in the mid-1860s to work the coastal scrub near Bundaberg. By the same decade there were five pastoral stations on the lower Burnett River: Tantitha, Kolan, Barolin, Bingera, and Branyan.

Selection of land around Bundaberg began in 1867 under the "Sugar and Coffee Regulations" of the Crown Lands Alienation Act 1860, which aimed to promote agriculture and closer settlement. The Crown Lands Alienation Act 1868, also designed to promote closer settlement, enabled the resumption of half of the Bingera and Branyan pastoral runs in November 1869. The site of Bundaberg was officially surveyed the same year. A large farm was established by Edward Lloyd Elwood by 1871, on a large bend south of the Burnett River (upstream from today's Branyan Road State School) on land resumed from the Bingera run. This was referred to as "Branyan Plantation" by 1879, by which time it was owned by EB Jeune, who established Branyan Sugar Mill. The school was named after the road to this plantation.

Bundaberg's development as a port and service centre was boosted by growing coastal traffic and by its designation as the port for Mount Perry's copper mining from 1881. Surrounded by sugar plantations and the site of two sugar refineries, Bundaberg became an important sugar town. The first South Sea Islander (SSI) indentured labour arrived in Bundaberg in 1879 and the sugar plantation system reached its peak in Queensland in the early 1880s. However, the Queensland Government, seeking to promote European closer settlement, passed legislation in 1885 to end recruitment of SSI labour. As a result, large sugar plantations with their own mills and a SSI workforce were eventually replaced by European small farmers supplying central sugar mills. In 1889 there were 202 cane farmers in Queensland; this rose to 2,610 by 1901. By 1911, over 4300 small farmers had replaced the 140 Queensland plantations that had existed in 1888.

=== 20th century school history ===
The increased European population in sugar growing areas like Bundaberg meant more schools were required. In 1904 a 5 acres (2.0 ha) school reserve was gazetted on Branyan Road, on part of a former quarry reserve. The Branyan Road Provisional School opened 14 April 1905.

The school building at Branyan Road had a single classroom measuring 21 by 14 feet (6.4 m × 4.3 m), and a 7 feet (2.1 m) deep front verandah, stepped in from the gable bargeboard and set at a slightly shallower angle than the building's main roof. The recommended government design normally had single skin walls, clad with chamferboards, and had rectangular louvred vents above the sash windows in the gable-end walls.

Soon after its opening, the school was affected by the aftermath of a serious industrial accident. In September 1906 a night-shift boiler explosion at the Bonna sugar mill (Bonna plantation was located adjacent to Branyan plantation) seriously injured three men. Two of the men, Frank Juel and Jack Lavery, died while being transported to Bundaberg the next morning. As a memorial to the two men, two mango trees were planted that year at Branyan Road Provisional School, but neither tree survives in 2015.

In 1909, by lowering the required minimum average number of pupils for a state school from 30 to 12, the Department of Public Instruction upgraded the majority of provisional schools to state school status, gradually providing these schools with new buildings designed and constructed to government standards. In 1912 the requirement for communities to contribute one-fifth of the cost of establishing a state school was abolished. With these reforms, the provisional school system became virtually redundant, although a number of these schools were maintained into the mid-20th century.

Branyan Road Provisional School's conversion to a state school had occurred by August 1909. Shortly afterwards a verandah was added to the rear of the school building by JT Novakoski. The 1910 plan for the addition shows casement windows, and boarding across the upper sections of the ends of the verandahs. The rear windows were also moved to accommodate a new door. The new verandah was built in line with the gable barge boards, in contrast to the original verandah, that was slightly stepped in.

As well as changes to buildings, the grounds were improved over time. Trees and gardens were planted as part of the beautification of schools. Educators believed gardening and Arbor Days (from 1890 in Queensland) instilled in young minds the value of hard work and activity, improved classroom discipline, developed aesthetic tastes, and inspired people to stay on the land. Aesthetically designed gardens were encouraged by regional inspectors. In 1912 Branyan Road State School placed third in the Education Department's awards (Bundaberg-Gladstone area) for state school gardens and experimental agricultural work; and in 1929 the school was noted for its picturesque flower gardens and sugar experimental plot. An early surviving tree planting at Branyan Road is a kauri pine (Agathis robusta), planted by school pupil Sydney Dittmann in 1914. This tree survives in 2015 as an impressive specimen to the north of the playshed.

The six post playshed, measuring 24 by 12 feet (7.3 by 3.7 m), was built in 1914. The Queensland education system recognised the importance of play in the school curriculum and, as school sites were originally clear of vegetation, the provision of all-weather outdoor space was needed. Playsheds were designed as free-standing shelters, with fixed timber seating between posts and earth or decomposed granite floors that provided covered play space and doubled as teaching space when required. These structures were timber-framed and generally open sided, although some were partially enclosed with timber boards or corrugated galvanised iron sheets. The hipped (or less frequently, gabled) roofs were clad with timber shingles or corrugated iron. Playsheds were a typical addition to state schools across Queensland between c. 1880s and the 1950s, although less frequently constructed after c. 1909, with the introduction of highset school buildings with understorey play areas.

Branyan Road State School flourished alongside the Queensland sugar industry. From the 1910s to the 1980s, this industry was protected and subsidised by both the Queensland and Federal governments, and Bundaberg continued to grow steadily between the two world wars. In the mid-1920s the teaching building was extended, most likely to the east, by adding an identical building, sourced from the Pine Creek area. Improvements to the grounds at this time included a tennis court, built by the school committee. However, this was not on the location of the tennis courts that exist in 2015, as the site of the latter was treed in a 1965 aerial photograph.

A pine plantation (forestry plot) was started north of the school buildings in 1947. The ground was prepared by Les Hull, and over 600 trees were planted in the following five years. Forestry plots were the product of after-school agricultural clubs, introduced in 1923 at primary schools, under the "home project" scheme. Curriculum driven, these clubs had a secondary commercial value as well as disseminating information and helping to develop a range of skills. The Department of Primary Industry provided suitable plants and offered horticultural advice. School forestry plots were seen by the government as a way of educating the next generation about the economic and environmental importance of trees, as well as providing testing grounds for new species. Located throughout the state, the plots were a means of experimenting with a variety of tree species in different soil and climatic conditions. The sale of timber grown in school plots provided an additional source of income for the school, and the plots themselves were an attractive feature of school grounds. The first school forestry plot was established at Marburg State Rural School in 1928. Encouraged by the Education and Forestry Departments, by 1953 about 380 Queensland schools were undertaking forestry projects. Different species of pine tree were planted at Branyan Road State School over time, and in 2015 the plot included kauri, hoop (Araucaria cunninghamii), and slash (Pinus elliottii).

In the late 1950s and early 1960s there was unprecedented growth in the district, due to irrigation projects and the development of the Port of Bundaberg as a deep-water sugar port near the mouth of the Burnett River (1958). Many large building projects were completed in Bundaberg, including new hospitals, schools, court house, customs house, and civic centre, and the population of Bundaberg rose from 18,000 in 1952 to 27,000 in 1967.

Alterations and additions at Branyan Road State School reflected Bundaberg's growth and prosperity. In 1962, electric fluorescent lights were installed in the teaching building, which was altered in the mid-1960s to improve lighting, with a long clerestory window on the north elevation. This was in line with a post-World War II emphasis on aligning buildings ten degrees east of north, with verandahs protecting the northern side and classrooms facing south. This led to the construction of school buildings that were oriented in relation to the sun rather than the site boundaries. In existing older buildings, verandahs were enclosed as weather protection and verandah balustrades were replaced with bag racks for improved storage. Many buildings had their fenestration altered to increase the amount of light into the classrooms, and many older windows were replaced with modern awning style windows. By 1965, the ends of the rear verandah at Branyan Road State School had been enclosed to create store rooms and the balustrade had been replaced by bag racks. At this time the building consisted of a single classroom.

Further additions and changes to the school complex included: a two-classroom demountable block and toilet block in 1979; a covered play area and car park in 1983; conversion of the original teaching building and its extension into a library, health services, and staff room in 1984; plus construction of Stage 1 of a new teaching block that year. New buildings continued to be added between 1985 and 2001, and a new sports field was created in 1997.

=== 21st century ===
A multipurpose hall was built c. 2010 as part of the Building the Education Revolution (BER) program. The school grounds expanded to the east in the 1990s, from the original 2 hectares (4.9 acres), to a total of 4.7 hectares (12 acres) in 2015. Whereas the school was still separated from Bundaberg by about 4 kilometres (2.5 mi) of cane fields in the 1950s, recent housing development has meant that the school is now on the edge of town.

As at 2015, Branyan Road State School retains its original teaching building, playshed and forestry plot. The teaching building is used as a music-teaching and storage space and is featured on the school logo. The school is important to the town and district, having operated since 1905 and taught generations of Branyan students.

== Description ==
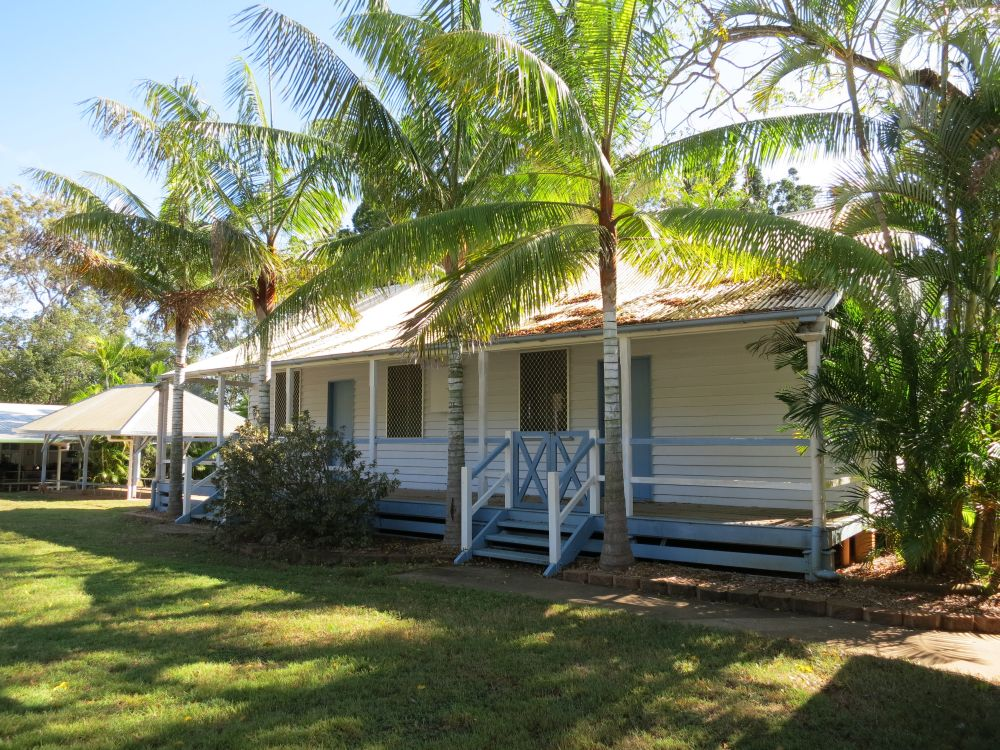
Branyan Road State School, 2014

Branyan Road State School occupies a large 4.7 hectares (12 acres) site bounded by Branyan Drive to the south and Tomato Island Road to the east in the suburb of Branyan, Bundaberg. The school is surrounded by a mixture of semi-rural and suburban residential development on the southwestern outskirts of Bundaberg. A water treatment plant adjoins the school on the western side, with the Burnett River approximately 350 metres (1,150 ft) west of the site. The school buildings are mostly located in the southwestern corner of the school grounds, and an established forestry plot (1947) is adjacent to the western boundary. Set well back from and addressing Branyan Drive, the original teaching building is long and rectangular in plan and overlooks a grassed area to the south. The building comprises two connected buildings (1905, and c. 1892–1910, combined in the current position in the 1920s) that are of a similar style and construction. A playshed (1914) is located west of the teaching building.

=== Teaching building ===
The teaching building is a one-storey, lowset, timber-framed building on concrete stumps, clad with weatherboards and sheltered by a gable roof lined with corrugated metal sheets. Most doors and windows are modern replacements, generally set within early openings. A clerestory window located along the north-facing roof plane of the building is a later modification that provides additional light to the interior. Windows on the eastern and western gable end walls are sheltered by timber-framed, corrugated metal-clad hoods with battened cheeks. While similar, the western hood is narrower than the eastern hood. Rectangular vents within the gable end walls ventilate the roof space.

The building has verandahs to the south (front) and north (rear) sides; both accessed by two short flights of timber stairs. The verandah roofs are at different pitches to the main gable; with the side edges of the front verandah roof stepped in. The verandahs have stop-chamfered timber posts, timber floor boards, and raked ceilings lined with flat sheeting. A timber two-rail balustrade encloses the front verandah; the gates at the top of the stairs are modern additions. Most of the rear verandah balustrade has been replaced with bag racks, and its eastern and western ends have been enclosed to accommodate small store rooms. The eastern storeroom walls are clad in tongue-and-groove, vertically jointed timber boards, with internally exposed timber framing, and the western storeroom walls are clad in flat sheeting.

The interior layout comprises three rooms, separated by timber partitions. Vertical-jointed timber boards clad the partitions, walls and the underside of the roof. Timber roof framing is exposed within the space, and modern fixed, wired-glass windows, in-line with the partitions, are inset within the roof trusses. Skirtings and cornices are timber; the skirtings are of a simple profile and the cornices are stepped. Modern carpet and linoleum lining early timber floorboards are not of cultural heritage significance.

=== Playshed ===
The playshed stands to the west of the teaching building. The timber-framed structure has a modern concrete slab floor, and is sheltered by a hipped roof clad with corrugated metal sheets. Six, square, timber posts support the roof and are braced to the exposed roof framing by brackets.

=== Grounds ===
The school grounds are well established and include mature trees. North of the playshed, a variety of mature pine trees, including kauri pines (Agathis robusta), hoop pines (Araucaria cunninghamii) and slash pines (Pinus elliottii), stand within a forestry plot; sections of this plot are planted in rows. A particularly large kauri pine is located between the playshed and the forestry plot.

=== Other structures ===
Sheds, covered walkways, play equipment and other structures within the school grounds are not of cultural heritage significance.

== Heritage listing ==
Branyan Road State School was listed on the Queensland Heritage Register on 1 May 2015 having satisfied the following criteria.

The place is important in demonstrating the evolution or pattern of Queensland's history.

Branyan Road State School (established in 1905 as Branyan Road Provisional School) is important in demonstrating the evolution of state education and its associated architecture in Queensland. The place retains excellent, representative examples of standard government designs that were architectural responses to prevailing government educational philosophies. The teaching building consists of two provisional school buildings of the same standard design (utilised 1892–1910) by the Queensland Department of Public Works, joined end-to-end in the 1920s. The playshed (1914), also a standard design, demonstrates the education system's recognition of the importance of play in the curriculum.

The forestry plot (1947 onwards) is evidence of a popular educational initiative that conveyed the economic and environmental importance of forestry to students, while creating an attractive landscape feature and income for schools.

The place is important in demonstrating the principal characteristics of a particular class of cultural places.

Branyan Road State School is important in demonstrating the principal characteristics of Queensland state schools with later modifications. These include buildings of standard designs and generous landscaped sites with mature trees.

The teaching building, comprising two buildings of the same standard design by the Queensland Department of Public Works, is important in demonstrating the principal characteristics of Queensland provisional school buildings. The conjoined buildings retain their lowset form; narrow width; original verandah slope, with the front verandah stepped in from the gable bargeboards; exposed roof trusses; and louvered gable ventilation.

The playshed (1914) retains its open sides and hipped, timber-framed roof supported on timber posts.

The kauri pine (Agathis robusta), planted by a pupil in 1914, is a fine example of the feature trees planted in Queensland school grounds. Similarly, the forestry plot is also a fine example of such plantings, containing several pine tree species.

The place has a strong or special association with a particular community or cultural group for social, cultural or spiritual reasons.

Schools have always played an important part in Queensland communities. They typically retain significant and enduring connections with former pupils, parents, and teachers; provide a venue for social interaction and volunteer work; and are a source of pride, symbolising local progress and aspirations.

Branyan Road State School has a strong and ongoing association with the Branyan community. It was established in 1905 through the fundraising efforts of the local community and generations of Branyan children have been taught there. The place is important for its contribution to the educational development of Branyan.

== See also ==
- List of schools in Wide Bay–Burnett
