= Givelda, Queensland =

Givelda
- Suburb
- Interactive map of Givelda
- Coordinates: 24.9905°S 152.1488°E
- Country: Australia
- State: Queensland
- LGA: Bundaberg Region
- Location: 28.5 km (17.7 mi) SW of Bundaberg CBD; 353 km (219 mi) N of Brisbane

Government
  - State electorate: Burnett
  - Federal division: Hinkler

Area
  - Total: 9.3 km^{2} (3.6 sq mi)

Population
  - Total: 42 (2021 census)
  - Density: 4.52/km^{2} (11.70/sq mi)
- Time zone: UTC+10:00 (AEST)
- Postcode: 4670
Suburbs around Givelda
Electra	South Kolan	South Kolan
Electra	Givelda	South Kolan
Electra	Pine Creek	Pine Creek

Givelda is a rural locality in the Bundaberg Region, Queensland, Australia. In the 2021 census, Givelda had a population of 42 people.

== History ==
Givelda Provisional School opened circa 1896. On 1 January 1909, it became Givelda State School.

== Demographics ==
In the 2016 census, Givelda had a population of 50 people.

In the 2021 census, Givelda had a population of 42 people.

== Education ==
Givelda State School is a government primary (Prep-6) school for boys and girls at 754 Pine Creek Road (24.9875°S 152.1492°E). In 2018, the school had an enrolment of 13 students with 2 teachers (1 full-time equivalent) and 6 non-teaching staff (2 full-time equivalent). As at 2025, the school was open but had no students enrolled; the last reported student enrolments were eight students in 2021.

The nearest government secondary school is Bundaberg State High School in Bundaberg South to the north-east.

There are also a number of non-government schools in Bundaberg and its suburbs.
