= Bundaberg–Gin Gin Road =

Road in Queensland, Australia

Bundaberg–Gin Gin Road Queensland

General information
- Type: Road
- Length: 48.4 km (30 mi)

Major junctions
- East end: Bundaberg–Bargara Road, Bundaberg Central
- Isis Highway; Moore Park Road; Bundaberg–Mirian Vale Road; The Cedars Road
- West end: Bruce Highway, Gin Gin

Location(s)
- Major suburbs: Bundaberg North, Oakwood, Sharon, South Kolan

Bundaberg–Gin Gin Road is a state-controlled district road (number 176) in the Bundaberg region of Queensland, Australia. It runs from Bundaberg–Bargara Road (Quay Street) in Bundaberg Central to the Bruce Highway in Gin Gin, a distance of 48.4 kilometres (30.1 mi). It is signed as State Route 3.

== Route description ==
Bundaberg–Gin Gin Road starts at an intersection with Bundaberg–Bargara Road (Quay Street) in Bundaberg Central. It runs northwest with no route number as Burnett Bridge over the Burnett River. In Bundaberg North it crosses Perry Street at an offset intersection and continues north as Queen Street. It turns northwest as Bundaberg–Gin Gin Road, passing the northeastern end of the Isis Highway (Hinkler Avenue, State Route 3) where it becomes Mount Perry Road and assumes the State Route 3 shield before turning west.

The road continues to the west until it passes the exit to Moore Park Road to the northwest. It then turns southwest, enters Oakwood, and turns northwest as Gin Gin Road. Passing the exit to Bundaberg–Miriam Vale Road (Rosedale Road) to the northwest it again turns west. Next it crosses Splitters Creek and enters Sharon before turning southwest. It crosses Sharon and enters South Kolan before reaching the exit to The Cedars Road (Hill End Road) to the south. Continuing generally southwest the road runs through Bullyard where it passes the exit to Bucca Road to the northeast. It then passes through Maroondan before running between McIlwraith and Gin Gin, then entering Gin Gin and ending at an intersection with the Bruce Highway.

As a numbered State Route this road is part of the main route from Bundaberg to central and northern Queensland, although the Bundaberg–Miriam Vale Road provides a shorter route (by about 30 kilometres (19 mi)) to the north.

== History ==
European settlement of the Burnett River region began in 1848 when Gregory Blaxland Jnr (son of the explorer Gregory Blaxland) together with William Forster brought their flocks of sheep up from their squatting leases on the Clarence River. The pastoral run they selected extended along the river valley all the way from what is now Gin Gin to the coast and they called it Tirroan. The modern town of Gin Gin is located close to where the original homestead was constructed. In 1877, 12,000 acres (4,900 ha) of land were resumed from the Gin Gin (formerly Tirroan) pastoral run. The land was offered for selection for the establishment of small farms on 17 April 1877.

In 1867, timber-getters and farmers, John and Gavin Steuart, established the Woondooma property which consisted of a few houses and a wharf on the northern banks of the Burnett River where Bundaberg North now stands. An official survey of the area was undertaken in 1869 by John Charlton Thompson, and the town of Bundaberg was gazetted across the river on the higher, southern banks. Burnett Bridge, the first steel bridge across the river, was constructed in 1900.

Until May 1940, when a low level bridge was constructed over the Burnett River at Wallaville, this road was part of the Bruce Highway.

== Intersecting state-controlled roads ==
This road intersects with the following state-controlled roads:

- Isis Highway
- Moore Park Road
- Bundaberg–Miriam Vale Road
- The Cedars Road

=== Moore Park Road ===
Moore Park Road
- Location: Bundaberg–Gin Gin Road, Bundaberg North to Murdochs Road, Moore Park Beach
- Length: 15.4 km (9.6 mi)

Moore Park Road is a state-controlled district road (number 1761), rated as a local road of regional significance (LRRS). It runs from Bundaberg–Gin Gin Road in Bundaberg North to Murdochs Road in Moore Park Beach, a distance of 15.4 kilometres (9.6 mi) This road has no intersections with other state-controlled roads.

=== Bundaberg–Miriam Vale Road ===
Bundaberg–Miriam Vale Road
- Location: Bundaberg–Gin Gin Road, Oakwood to Bruce Highway, Miriam Vale
- Length: 111 km (69 mi)

Bundaberg–Miriam Vale Road is a state-controlled district road (number 179), rated as a local road of regional significance (LRRS). It runs from Bundaberg–Gin Gin Road in Oakwood to the Bruce Highway in Miriam Vale, a distance of 111 kilometres (69 mi). It consists of three locally named roads; Rosedale Road, Tableland Road, and Fingerboard Road. This road has no intersections with other state-controlled roads. It is part of the shortest route from Bundaberg to Rockhampton.

=== The Cedars Road ===
The Cedars Road
- Location: Bundaberg–Gin Gin Road, South Kolan to Isis Highway, South Bingera
- Length: 9.2 km (5.7 mi)

The Cedars Road is a state-controlled district road (number 1703), rated as a local road of regional significance (LRRS). It runs from Bundaberg–Gin Gin Road in South Kolan to the Isis Highway in South Bingera, a distance of 9.2 kilometres (5.7 mi), crossing the Burnett River by a low-level single-lane bridge. This road has no major intersections.

== Major intersections ==
All distances are from Google Maps. The entire road is within the Bundaberg local government area.

Location	km	mi	Destinations	Notes
Bundaberg Central	0	0.0	Bundaberg–Bargara Road (Quay Street) – southwest – Bundaberg West – northeast – Bundaberg East	Eastern end of Bundaberg–Gin Gin Road. Road runs northwest as Burnett Bridge with no route number.
Bundaberg North	0.6	0.37	Perry Street – west/east – Bundaberg North	Road continues north as Queen Street.
Bundaberg North	1.3	0.81	Queen Street – north – Bundaberg North	Road turns northwest as Bundaberg–Gin Gin Road.
Bundaberg North	1.8	1.1	Isis Highway (Hinkler Avenue) – south – Bundaberg West, Apple Tree Creek; Fairymead Road – north – Fairymead	Road continues northwest, then west as Mount Perry Road (State Route 3)
Bundaberg North	4.0	2.5	Moore Park Road – northwest – Gooburrum, Moore Park Beach	Road continues west.
Oakwood	5.9	3.7	Bundaberg–Miriam Vale Road – northwest – Rosedale, Miriam Vale	Name changes to Gin Gin Road and continues west.
South Kolan	23.5	14.6	The Cedars Road (Hill End Road) – south – South Bingera, Isis Highway	Road continues southwest.
Bullyard	36.5	22.7	Bucca Road – northeast – Bucca	Road continues southwest.
Gin Gin	48.4	30.1	Bruce Highway – southeast – Booyal – northwest – Miriam Vale	Western end of Bundaberg–Gin Gin Road.
1.000 mi = 1.609 km; 1.000 km = 0.621 mi: Route transition

== See also ==
- List of numbered roads in Queensland
