= Shire of Gooburrum =

Coordinates: 24°52′15.5″S 152°20′51.5″E

Shire of Gooburrum Queensland
- Population: 7,117 (1991 census)
  - Density: 5.4221/km^{2} (14.0431/sq mi)
- Established: 1886
- Area: 1,312.6 km^{2} (506.8 sq mi)
- Council seat: Bundaberg
- Region: Wide Bay–Burnett
LGAs around Shire of Gooburrum:
Miriam Vale	Pacific Ocean	Pacific Ocean
Kolan	Shire of Gooburrum	Pacific Ocean
Kolan	Woongarra	Bundaberg

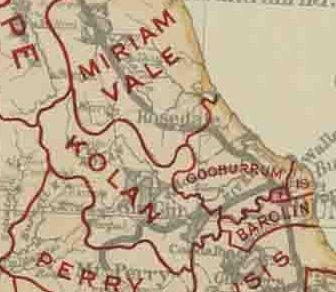
Map of Gooburrum Division and adjacent local government areas, March 1902. Legend: Bundaberg Municipality (1), Woongarra Division (19)

The Shire of Gooburrum was a local government area to the north and west of the regional city of Bundaberg, Queensland, Australia. The shire covered an area of 1,312.6 square kilometres (506.8 sq mi). It was administered from Bundaberg. It existed as a local government entity from 1886 until 1994, when it amalgamated with the Shire of Woongarra to form the Shire of Burnett.

== History ==
Kolan Division was established on 11 November 1879 as one of the original divisions under the Divisional Boards Act 1879. On 28 January 1886, the region north of the Burnett River was excised from Kolan Division to create a separate Gooburrum Division.

With the passage of the Local Authorities Act 1902, Gooburrum Division became the Shire of Gooburrum on 31 March 1903. The Shire's offices were located in 186 Bourbong Street, Bundaberg, adjacent to Bundaberg City's offices.

In 1909, the Gooburrum Shire had an area of 512 square miles, a population of 4340, and 708 ratepayers. The value of the shire was estimated at £257,752, and the Government indebtedness totals £13,761.

On 21 November 1991, the Electoral and Administrative Review Commission, created two years earlier, produced its second report, and recommended that local government boundaries in the Bundaberg area be rationalised. The Local Government (Bundaberg and Burnett) Regulation 1993 was gazetted on 17 December 1993, and on 30 March 1994, the Shire of Goolburrum was abolished and amalgamated with Shire of Woongarra to form the Shire of Burnett.

A tribute to the Shire of Gooburrum can be found on the ground floor of Fairymead House, Bundaberg Botanic Gardens in the museum section of the home.

== Towns and localities ==
- Abbotsford
- Avondale
- Bucca
- Bullyard
- Fairymead
- Gooburrum
- Littabella
- Meadowvale
- Miara
- Moore Park
- Moorland
- Oakwood
- Sharon
- South Kolan
- Watalgan
- Waterloo
- Welcome Creek
- Winfield
- Yandaran

== Chairmen ==
- 1927: A. J. Gibson

== Population ==
Year	Population
1921	2,922
1933	3,915
1947	3,825
1954	4,131
1961	4,372
1966	4,776
1971	4,519
1976	5,227
1981	5,261
1986	5,917
1991	7,117
