= Meadowvale, Queensland =

Meadowvale
- Suburb
- Interactive map of Meadowvale
- Coordinates: 24.82°S 152.2388°E
- Country: Australia
- State: Queensland
- LGA: Bundaberg Region
- Location: 11.4 km (7.1 mi) NW of Bundaberg CBD; 118 km (73 mi) NNW of Hervey Bay; 376 km (234 mi) N of Brisbane

Government
  - State electorate: Burnett
  - Federal division: Flynn

Area
  - Total: 50.6 km^{2} (19.5 sq mi)

Population
  - Total: 434 (2021 census)
  - Density: 8.577/km^{2} (22.21/sq mi)
- Time zone: UTC+10:00 (AEST)
- Postcode: 4670
Suburbs around Meadowvale
Moorland	Welcome Creek	Welcome Creek
Bucca	Meadowvale	Gooburrum
South Kolan	Sharon	Oakwood

Meadowvale is a rural locality in the Bundaberg Region, Queensland, Australia. In the 2021 census, Meadowvale had a population of 434 people.

== Geography ==
The locality is bounded to the south by Splitters Creek and to the north-east by the North Coast railway line.

The North Coast railway line enters the locality from the south-east (Oakwood / Gooburrum) and exits to the north (Moorland / Welcome Creek). Meadowvale railway station serves the locality (24.8166°S 152.2756°E), while Booloongie railway siding is now abandoned (24.82778°S 152.29028°E).

The land use is predominantly crop growing (mostly sugarcane) with some grazing on native vegetation and rural residential housing.

== History ==
Booloongie railway siding was named in December 1918. In October 1931, a collision occurred between a train and a truck at the level crossing.

Meadowvale State School opened on 10 April 1934. It was officially opened on Saturday 28 April 1934 by local politician Tommy Williams. The school closed on 18 February 1945. It was on the northern side of Moorlands Road (approx 24.80739°S 152.25428°E).

== Demographics ==
In the 2016 census, Meadowvale had a population of 469 people.

In the 2021 census, Meadowvale had a population of 434 people.

== Education ==
There are no schools in Meadowvale. The nearest government primary schools are Gooburrum State School in neighbouring Gooburrum to the east and Sharon State School in neighbouring Sharon to the south. The nearest government secondary school is Bundaberg North State High School in Bundaberg North to the south-east.

== Amenities ==
The Bundaberg Pistol Club has its shooting range at 11 Heales Road (24.8258°S 152.2651°E).

== Attractions ==
Meadowvale Nature Park offers two walking tracks through paperbarks, eucalypts and grass trees to views over Splitters Creek. It is popular for its wildlfowers (seasonal), birdsong, and platypus sightings (dawn and dusk) in Splitters Creek. It is at 475 Rosedale Road (24.8257°S 152.2703°E).

Despite the name, Bargara Berries have their strawberry farm at 104 Hoods Road (24.8138°S 152.2879°E) in Meadowale. Visitors are welcome to visit the farm and pick their own berries.
