= Dalysford, Queensland =

Dalysford
- Suburb
- Interactive map of Dalysford
- Coordinates: 25.0149°S 151.8997°E
- Country: Australia
- State: Queensland
- LGA: Bundaberg Region
- Location: 8.1 km (5.0 mi) SW of Gin Gin; 56.7 km (35.2 mi) WSW of Bundaberg; 369 km (229 mi) NNW of Brisbane

Government
  - State electorate: Callide
  - Federal division: Flynn

Area
  - Total: 20.3 km^{2} (7.8 sq mi)

Population
  - Total: 136 (2021 census)
  - Density: 6.70/km^{2} (17.35/sq mi)
- Time zone: UTC+10:00 (AEST)
- Postcode: 4671
Suburbs around Dalysford
Moolboolaman	Moolboolaman	Tirroan
Moolboolaman	Dalysford	Tirroan
Horse Camp	Horse Camp	St Kilda

Dalysford is a rural locality in the Bundaberg Region, Queensland, Australia. In the 2021 census, Dalysford had a population of 136 people.

== History ==
Dalysford Provisional opened circa 1892. On 1 January 1909, it became Dalysford State School. It closed temporarily between late 1924 to circa April 1925 due to low student numbers. It closed permanently in 1927. It was located to the south-west of Dalysford railway station, off the Dalysford Road (approx 25.0214°S 151.8734°E), just across the locality boundary into present-day Moolboolaman.

== Demographics ==
In the 2016 census, Dalysford had a population of 117 people.

In the 2021 census, Dalysford had a population of 136 people.

== Education ==
There are no schools in Dalysford. The nearest government primary schools are Gin Gin State School in Gin Gin to the north-east and Wallaville State School in Wallaville to the south-east. The nearest government secondary school is Gin Gin State High School in Gin Gin.
