= Welcome Creek =

- Suburb
- Interactive map of Welcome Creek
- Coordinates: 24.7722°S 152.2613°E
- Country: Australia
- State: Queensland
- LGA: Bundaberg Region
- Location: 12.7 km (7.9 mi) NNW of Bundaberg CBD; 371 km (231 mi) N of Brisbane

Government
  - State electorate: Burnett
  - Federal division: Flynn

Area
  - Total: 46.6 km^{2} (18.0 sq mi)

Population
  - Total: 421 (2021 census)
  - Density: 9.034/km^{2} (23.40/sq mi)
- Time zone: UTC+10:00 (AEST)
- Postcode: 4670
Suburbs around Welcome Creek
Moorland	Moore Park Beach	Moore Park Beach
Moorland	Welcome Creek	Fairymead
Meadowvale	Meadowvale	Gooburrum

Welcome Creek is a rural locality in the Bundaberg Region, Queensland, Australia. In the 2021 census, Welcome Creek had a population of 421 people.

== Geography ==
The locality takes its name from the watercourse (24.7666°S 152.3°E).

North Gooburrum is a neighbourhood in the north-west of the locality (24.7653°S 152.2510°E).

The land use is agricultural, predominantly irrigated horticulture with some sugarcane plantations in the east of the locality and some grazing on native vegetation in the north of the locality.

== History ==
Welcome Creek State School opened on 21 May 1931 and closed on 31 December 2003. After closure, the students were transferred to Moore Park State School in neighbouring Moore Park Beach. The school was located at 669 Moore Park Road (24.7697°S 152.2792°E).

Agnew School opened on 3 February 2003 in Boundary Street, South Bundaberg, one of several Agnew Schools operated by the Plymouth Brethren Christian Church (sometimes called the Exclusive Brethren) in Queensland. By 2006 the school needed more space and in mid-2006 the church purchased the former Welcome School State School from the Queensland Government and relocated the Agnew School to that site (24.7699°S 152.2792°E). However, in 2014 with student numbers at 30-40 students, it was decided to close the school and transport the students by wifi-equipped bus each day to the Agnew School in Maryborough. On 24 December 2020, the site was sold for $925,000.

== Demographics ==
In the 2016 census, Welcome Creek had a population of 445 people.

In the 2021 census, Welcome Creek had a population of 421 people.

== Education ==
There are no schools in Welcome Creek. The nearest government primary schools are Moore Park Beach State School in neighbouring Moore Park Beach to the north and Gooburrum State School in neighbouring Gooburrum to the south-east. The nearest government secondary school is Bundaberg North State High School in Bundaberg North to the south-east.

== Amenities ==
Welcome Creek Hall is at 687 Moore Park Road (24.7712°S 152.2796°E).
