= Wallaville railway line =

Former railway line in Queensland, Australia

The Wallaville Branch Railway was a fifty kilometre railway line in Queensland, Australia. It was a branch line from Goondoon railway station (24°56′38″S 152°06′10″E) (about twenty kilometres east of Gin Gin on the Mount Perry railway line in the Bundaberg Region of Queensland, Australia) southwest to Kalliwa Creek. It was approved in December 1914 to tap the Goodnight Scrub forests and to transport sugar cane to the Wallaville mill established in 1896.

== Construction ==
Work began but was suspended in 1916. Construction resumed after World War I and the first stage to Wallaville was opened on 9 August 1920. Stops were established en route at Snake Creek, Bungadoo, Delan, Weithew, Berrembea, Drinan and Lallewoon. Two trains a week plied the route plus additional services during the sugar crushing season.

== Extension ==
As an employment measure during the depression, the line was extended beyond Wallaville about 10 kilometres via Innes to Morganville but still well short of the original Kalliwa Creek proposal. Located near the banks of the Perry River, Morganville was named in honour of the Railways Minister Godfrey Morgan and after whom the town of Glenmorgan in southwest Queensland was also named. Passing through Innes Siding, the extension opened on 3 October 1931. The Morganville extension generated some year round traffic in hoop pine logs and cattle.

== Closure ==
The Innes Siding to Morganville section closed on 31 October 1960 and from Wallaville to Innes Siding closed on 30 April 1964. It must be assumed that they were not viable. The remaining section from Goondoon to Wallaville closed on 30 June 1964. The trackbed was sold to the Wallaville sugar mill, which converted the majority to a two foot gauge sugar cane tramway.
