= Doughboy, Queensland =

Doughboy
- Suburb
- Interactive map of Doughboy
- Coordinates: 25.1316°S 151.8330°E
- Country: Australia
- State: Queensland
- LGA: Bundaberg Region
- Location: 24.5 km (15.2 mi) SW of Wallaville; 25.0 km (15.5 mi) SW of Gin Gin; 73.7 km (45.8 mi) SW of Bundaberg; 379 km (235 mi) NNW of Brisbane

Government
  - State electorate: Callide
  - Federal division: Flynn

Area
  - Total: 67.1 km^{2} (25.9 sq mi)

Population
  - Total: 22 (2021 census)
  - Density: 0.328/km^{2} (0.849/sq mi)
- Time zone: UTC+10:00 (AEST)
- Postcode: 4671
Suburbs around Doughboy
Nearum	Nearum	Horse Camp
Mount Perry	Doughboy	St Agnes
Mount Perry	Good Night	Good Night

Doughboy is a rural locality in the Bundaberg Region, Queensland, Australia. In the 2021 census, Doughboy had a population of 22 people.

== Geography ==
The Gongiberoo Range forms part of the south-western boundary of the locality.

Doughboy Road enters the locality from the north (Neurum) and exits to the south-east (Good Night).

The land use is grazing on native vegetation with some rural residential housing on Doughboy Road.

== Demographics ==
In the 2016 census, Doughboy had a population of 24 people.

In the 2021 census, Doughboy had a population of 22 people.

== Education ==
There are no schools in Doughboy. The nearest government state schools are Wallaville State School in Wallaville to the north-east and Gin Gin State School in Gin Gin to the north. The nearest government secondary school is Gin Gin State High School, also in Gin Gin.
