= Moorland, Queensland =

Moorland
- Suburb
- Interactive map of Moorland
- Coordinates: 24.7636°S 152.2075°E
- Country: Australia
- State: Queensland
- LGA: Bundaberg Region
- Location: 20.8 km (12.9 mi) NW of Bundaberg CBD; 385 km (239 mi) N of Brisbane

Government
  - State electorate: Burnett
  - Federal division: Flynn

Area
  - Total: 47.4 km^{2} (18.3 sq mi)

Population
  - Total: 284 (2021 census)
  - Density: 5.992/km^{2} (15.52/sq mi)
- Time zone: UTC+10:00 (AEST)
- Postcode: 4670
Suburbs around Moorland
Avondale	Moore Park Beach	Moore Park Beach
Avondale	Moorland	Welcome Creek
Avondale	Bucca	Meadowvale

Moorland is a rural locality in the Bundaberg Region, Queensland, Australia. In the 2021 census, Moorland had a population of 284 people.

== Geography ==
The locality is bounded to the west by Kolan River, to the north by Booyan Road, to the east in party by Vecellios Road and the North Coast railway line, and to the south by Rosedale Road.

The district once known as North Kolan (or Kolan North) spans Moorland and neighbouring Bucca to the south.

== History ==
Greenwood Provisional School opened on 15 February 1886. In 1899, it was renamed Moorland Provisional School. On 1 January 1909, it became Moorland State School. It closed on 31 March 1931, but reopened on 26 August 1946. On 31 December 1964, it closed, but reopened on 24 January 1966. It closed permanently on 31 October 1975. The school was located on Moorland Road (approx 24.73645°S 152.1827°E).

The locality was served by the now-abandoned Moorland railway station on the North Coast railway line (24.7492°S 152.1852°E).

== Demographics ==
In the 2016 census, Moorland had a population of 270 people.

In the 2021 census, Moorland had a population of 284 people.

== Education ==
There are no schools in Moorland. The nearest government primary schools are Moore Park Beach State School in neighbouring Moore Park Beach to the north-east, Gooburrum State School in Gooburrum to the south-east, and Avondale State School in Avondale to the north-west. The nearest government secondary schools are Bundaberg North State High School in Bundaberg North to the south-east.
