= Good Night, Queensland =

Good Night
- Suburb
- Interactive map of Good Night
- Coordinates: 25.24260°S 151.89920°E
- Country: Australia
- State: Queensland
- LGAs: Bundaberg Region; North Burnett Region
- Location: 33.6 km (20.9 mi) S of Gin Gin; 77.4 km (48.1 mi) SW of Bundaberg; 90.7 km (56.4 mi) NE of Gayndah; 332 km (206 mi) NNW of Brisbane

Government
  - State electorate: Callide
  - Federal division: Flynn

Area
  - Total: 254.3 km^{2} (98.2 sq mi)

Population
  - Total: 151 (2021 census)
  - Density: 0.5938/km^{2} (1.538/sq mi)
- Time zone: UTC+10:00 (AEST)
- Postcode: 4671
Suburbs around Good Night
Doughboy	St Agnes	Morganville
Mount Perry	Good Night	Booyal
Mingo	Wateranga; Coringa	Dallarnil

Good Night is a rural locality split between the Bundaberg Region and the North Burnett Region, Queensland, Australia. It is also written as Goodnight. In the 2021 census, Good Night had a population of 151 people.

== Geography ==
The Burnett River bounds the locality to the south-east and Kallina Creek to the south-west.

The Goodnight Scrub National Park occupies most of the southern part of the locality, which is accessed from Booyal on the Bruce Highway via a low-level bridge over the Burnett River.

There is some rural residential development in the east of the locality and some crop growing in the north. Apart from these the predominant land use is grazing on native vegetation.

== History ==
Goodnight Scrub State School opened on 28 January 1919 and closed in 1942. A 1942 map suggests it was on Goodnight Scrub Road at approx 25.2025°S 151.9690°E in present-day Morganville.

== Demographics ==
In the 2016 census, Good Night had a population of 117 people.

In the 2021 census, Good Night had a population of 151 people.

== Education ==
There are no schools in Good Night. The nearest government primary schools are Booyal State School in neighbouring Booyal to the east and Wallaville State School in Wallaville to the north-east. The nearest government secondary school is Gin Gin State High School in Gin Gin to the north-east.

== Amenities ==
The Goodnight Scrub Hall is at 333 Goodnight Scrub Road (25.21156°S 151.96907°E), now in Morganville.
