= Morganville, Queensland =

Morganville
- Suburb
- Interactive map of Morganville
- Coordinates: 25.1830°S 151.9594°E
- Country: Australia
- State: Queensland
- LGA: Bundaberg Region
- Location: 23.3 km (14.5 mi) S of Gin Gin; 48.9 km (30.4 mi) NW of Childers; 71.2 km (44.2 mi) SW of Bundaberg CBD; 365 km (227 mi) NNW of Brisbane

Government
  - State electorate: Callide
  - Federal division: Flynn

Area
  - Total: 68.3 km^{2} (26.4 sq mi)

Population
  - Total: 118 (2021 census)
  - Density: 1.728/km^{2} (4.475/sq mi)
- Time zone: UTC+10:00 (AEST)
- Postcode: 4671
Suburbs around Morganville
St Agnes	Wallaville	Duingal
Good Night	Morganville	Booyal
Good Night	Good Night	Booyal

Morganville is a rural locality in the Bundaberg Region, Queensland, Australia. In the 2021 census, Morganville had a population of 118 people.

== Geography ==
The locality is bounded by the Old Gayndah Road to the north, the Burnett River to the east, the Goodnight Scrub Road to the south-east, and the Perry River to the west.

Perry River is a neighbourhood (25.1833°S 151.95°E) around the Perry River, a tributary of the Burnett River (25.1688°S 151.9894°E). The name Perry refers to the mountain Mount Perry, which, in turn, was named after shepherd William Perry on the Tenningering pastoral run in the 1860s.

== History ==
The locality takes its name from the railway station, which was the terminus of the branch line from Goondoon. The name was assigned by the Queensland Railways Department on 14 March 1929 (although the line didn't open until 5 October 1931). It was named after politician Godfrey Morgan who was Secretary for Railways from 1929 to 1932 and who officially opened the line.

Perry River State School opened on 19 May 1925 under head teacher Norman Pyle. It closed on 9 December 1988. It was at 90 Perry River Farms Road (25.17721°S 151.95788°E).

== Demographics ==
In the 2016 census, Morganville had a population of 112 people.

In the 2021 census, Morganville had a population of 118 people.

== Education ==
There are no schools in Morganville. The nearest government primary schools are Booyal Central State School in neighbouring Booyal to the east and Wallaville State School in neighbouring Wallaville to the north. The nearest government secondary schools are Gin Gin State High School in Gin Gin to the north and Isis District State High School in Childers to the east.

== Amenities ==
The Goodnight Scrub Hall is at 333 Goodnight Scrub Road (25.21156°S 151.96907°E).
