= St Kilda, Queensland =

St Kilda
- Suburb
- Interactive map of St Kilda
- Coordinates: 25.0524°S 151.9205°E
- Country: Australia
- State: Queensland
- LGA: Bundaberg Region
- Location: 12 km (7.5 mi) SW of Gin Gin; 61.5 km (38.2 mi) SW of Bundaberg; 346 km (215 mi) N of Brisbane

Government
  - State electorate: Callide
  - Federal division: Flynn

Area
  - Total: 18.0 km^{2} (6.9 sq mi)

Population
  - Total: 99 (2021 census)
  - Density: 5.50/km^{2} (14.24/sq mi)
- Time zone: UTC+10:00 (AEST)
- Postcode: 4671
Suburbs around St Kilda
Dalysford	Tirroan	Redhill Farms
Horse Camp	St Kilda	Skyring Reserve
Horse Camp	Wallaville	Wallaville

St Kilda is a rural locality in the Bundaberg Region, Queensland, Australia. In the 2021 census, St Kilda has a population of 99 people.

== Geography ==
St Kilda is a freehold farming area with cropping in the flatter northern part of the locality and grazing in the hillier land in the rest of the locality. It is bounded in the south-west by Currajong Creek.

== History ==
St Kilda State School was opened on 20 November 1915 by Thomas Armfield, the Member of the Queensland Legislative Assembly for Musgrave. It was an open air school. It closed in 1922. It was on the south-east corner of Currajong Farms Road and Booths Road (25.04978°S 151.93009°E).

== Demographics ==
In the 2016 census, St Kilda had a population of 90 people.

In the 2021 census, St Kilda had a population of 99 people.

== Education ==
There are no schools in St Kilda. The nearest government primary schools are Wallaville State School in neighbouring Wallaville to the south-east and Gin Gin State School in Gin Gin to the north-east. The nearest government secondary school is Gin Gin State High School in Gin Gin.
