= Duingal, Queensland =

Duingal
- Suburb
- Interactive map of Duingal
- Coordinates: 25.1136°S 152.0636°E
- Country: Australia
- State: Queensland
- LGA: Bundaberg Region
- Location: 18.0 km (11.2 mi) S of Gin Gin; 59.4 km (36.9 mi) SW of Bundaberg CBD; 359 km (223 mi) N of Brisbane

Government
  - State electorate: Burnett
  - Federal division: Hinkler

Area
  - Total: 122.6 km^{2} (47.3 sq mi)

Population
  - Total: 70 (2021 census)
  - Density: 0.57/km^{2} (1.48/sq mi)
- Time zone: UTC+10:00 (AEST)
- Postcode: 4671
Suburbs around Duingal
Drinan	Delan	Bungadoo
Wallaville	Duingal	Promisedland
Morganville	Booyal	Booyal

Duingal is a rural locality in the Bundaberg Region, Queensland, Australia. In the 2021 census, Duingal had a population of 70 people.

== Geography ==
The Burnett River forms the northern boundary of the suburb.

The east of the locality is within the protected areas of Cordalba National Park and Cordalba State Forest. A section of the Booyal State Forest is in the south-west of the locality.

Elevations near the river are approximately 30 metres (98 ft) above sea level and most of the developed land (sugar cane farms) is in this area. The rest of the locality is more mountainous rising to unnamed peaks of 140 metres (460 ft). Duingal Creek flows from south (Booyal) to north through the locality where it becomes a tributary of the Burnett River.

The Bruce Highway enters from Booyal to the south and traverses the south-west of the locality and then crosses the Burnett River into Wallaville.

The Isis Central sugar mill operates a cane tramway through the locality for transporting the harvested sugarcane to the mill in Isis Central to the south-east.

Marule Mine is in the south-east of locality within the Cordalba State Forest (25.1430°S 152.0860°E). They extract agricultural lime and other minerals used to improve soil quality.

== History ==
The locality presumably takes its name from the Duingal Creek, which in turn was named by Lewis H. Maynard and is believed to an Aboriginal word, either dewingal or tewingal meaning scrub iron bark from which spears were made.

Duingal Provisional School opened circa 1896. It became Duingal State School on 1 January 1909. It closed temporarily in 1909 and 1911 due to low student numbers and finally closed late 1913 or early 1914.

== Demographics ==
In the 2016 census, Duingal had a population of 77 people.

In the 2021 census, Duingal had a population of 70 people.

== Education ==
There are no schools in Duingal. The nearest government primary schools are:

- Wallaville State School in neighbouring Wallaville to the west
- Booyal State School in neighbouring Booyal to the south
- Givelda State School in Givelda to the north-east
- Bullyard State School in Bullyard to the north

The nearest government secondary school is Gin Gin State High School in Gin Gin to the north-west.
