= St Agnes, Queensland =

St Agnes
- Suburb
- Interactive map of St Agnes
- Coordinates: 25.1386°S 151.9302°E
- Country: Australia
- State: Queensland
- LGA: Bundaberg Region
- Location: 13.3 km (8.3 mi) SSW of Wallaville; 24.3 km (15.1 mi) S of Gin Gin; 76.8 km (47.7 mi) SW of Bundaberg CBD; 357 km (222 mi) NNW of Brisbane

Government
  - State electorate: Callide
  - Federal division: Flynn

Area
  - Total: 26.2 km^{2} (10.1 sq mi)

Population
  - Total: 20 (2021 census)
  - Density: 0.76/km^{2} (2.0/sq mi)
- Time zone: UTC+10:00 (AEST)
- Postcode: 4671
Suburbs around St Agnes
Horse Camp	Wallaville	Wallaville
Doughboy	St Agnes	Morganville
Good Night	Good Night	Morganville

St Agnes is a rural locality in the Bundaberg Region, Queensland, Australia. In the 2021 census, St Agnes had a population of 20 people.

== Geography ==
St Agnes Creek enters the locality from the west (Doughboy) and flows south and then east through the locality, exiting to the south-east (Morganville) where it becomes a tributary of the Burnett River.

The Old Gayndah Road enters the locality from the south-east (Morganville) and loosely forms the south-eastern and southern boundary of the locality, before exiting to the south-west (Good Night).

The land use is predominantly grazing on native vegetation with some rural residential housing.

== History ==
Land was selected in this area in the 1880s.

== Demographics ==
In the 2016 census, St Agnes had a population of 22 people.

In the 2021 census, St Agnes had a population of 20 people.

== Education ==
There are no schools in St Agnes. The nearest government primary school is Wallaville State School in neighbouring Wallaville to the north-east. The nearest government secondary school is Gin Gin State High School in Gin Gin to the north.
