= Redhill Farms, Queensland =

Redhill Farms
- Suburb
- Interactive map of Redhill Farms
- Coordinates: 25.0227°S 151.9552°E
- Country: Australia
- State: Queensland
- LGA: Bundaberg Region
- Location: 6.4 km (4.0 mi) S of Gin Gin; 54.3 km (33.7 mi) WSW of Bundaberg; 274 km (170 mi) SSE of Rockhampton; 371 km (231 mi) NNW of Brisbane

Government
  - State electorate: Callide
  - Federal division: Flynn

Area
  - Total: 7.5 km^{2} (2.9 sq mi)

Population
  - Total: 32 (2021 census)
  - Density: 4.27/km^{2} (11.05/sq mi)
- Time zone: UTC+10:00 (AEST)
- Postcode: 4671
Suburbs around Redhill Farms
Tirroan	Gin Gin	McIlwraith
Tirroan	Redhill Farms	McIlwraith
St Kilda	Skyring Reserve	Drinan

Redhill Farms is a rural locality in the Bundaberg Region, Queensland, Australia. In the 2021 census, Redhill Farms had a population of 32 people.

== Geography ==
The Bruce Highway enters the locality from the south-east (Skyring Reserve / Drinan), forms the north-western boundary of the locality, and exits to the north (Gin Gin / McIlwraith).

The land use is a mixture of crop growing, grazing on native vegetation, and rural residential housing. There is a cane tramway to transport harvested sugarcane to the local sugar mill.

== Demographics ==
In the 2016 census, Redhill Farms had a population of 29 people.

In the 2021 census, Redhill Farms had a population of 32 people.

== Education ==
There are no schools in Redhill Farms. The nearest government primary and secondary schools are Gin Gin State School and Gin Gin State High School, both in neighbouring Gin Gin to the north.
