= Tirroan =

- Town
- Interactive map of Tirroan
- Coordinates: 25.0019°S 151.9294°E
- Country: Australia
- State: Queensland
- LGA: Bundaberg Region
- Location: 3.9 km (2.4 mi) WSW of Gin Gin; 52.6 km (32.7 mi) WSW of Bundaberg; 368 km (229 mi) N of Brisbane

Government
  - State electorate: Callide
  - Federal division: Flynn

Area
  - Total: 14.5 km^{2} (5.6 sq mi)

Population
  - Total: 150 (2021 census)
  - Density: 10.3/km^{2} (26.8/sq mi)
- Time zone: UTC+10:00 (AEST)
- Postcode: 4671
Localities around Tirroan
Moolboolaman	Gin Gin	Gin Gin
Dalysford	Tirroan	Gin Gin
St Kilda	Redhill Farms	Redhill Farms

Tirroan is a rural town and a locality in the Bundaberg Region, Queensland, Australia. In the 2021 census, the locality of Tirroan had a population of 150 people.

== History ==
The name Tirroan comes from the title of the first British pastoral property set up in the region, which was established by Gregory Blaxland Jnr and William Forster in 1848. It is possible that it is derived from the name of an Aboriginal stockman on this run, who later died of tuberculosis in 1880. The town itself was initially known as West Albany but the name was changed on 3 August 1899.

Watawa Provisional School opened on 9 February 1885 and was renamed Tirroan Provisional School in 1908. On 1 January 1909, it became Tirroan State School. It closed on 10 August 1956. It was on the eastern side of St Kilda Road (approx 25.02277°S 151.92454°E).

== Demographics ==
In the 2016 census, the locality of Tirroan had a population of 165 people.

In the 2021 census, the locality of Tirroan had a population of 150 people.

== Education ==
There are no schools in Tirroan. The nearest government primary and secondary schools are Gin Gin State School and Gin Gin State High School, both in neighbouring Gin Gin to the north-east.
