= Horse Camp, Queensland =

Horse Camp
- Suburb
- Interactive map of Horse Camp
- Coordinates: 25.0816°S 151.8913°E
- Country: Australia
- State: Queensland
- LGA: Bundaberg Region
- Location: 15.5 km (9.6 mi) SW of Gin Gin; 64.1 km (39.8 mi) SW of Bundaberg; 363 km (226 mi) NNW of Brisbane

Government
  - State electorate: Callide
  - Federal division: Flynn

Area
  - Total: 38.8 km^{2} (15.0 sq mi)

Population
  - Total: 486 (2021 census)
  - Density: 12.526/km^{2} (32.44/sq mi)
- Time zone: UTC+10:00 (AEST)
- Postcode: 4671
Suburbs around Horse Camp
Moolboolaman	Moolboolaman	Dalysford
Nearum	Horse Camp	St Kilda
Doughboy	St Agnes	Wallaville

Horse Camp is a rural locality in the Bundaberg Region, Queensland, Australia. In the 2021 census, Horse Camp had a population of 486 people.

== Geography ==
The predominant land use is rural residential housing with some grazing on native vegetation.

== Demographics ==
In the 2016 census, Horse Camp had a population of 413 people.

In the 2021 census, Horse Camp had a population of 486 people.

== Education ==
There are no schools in Horse Camp. The nearest government primary schools are Wallaville State School in neighbouring Wallaville to the east and Gin Gin State School in Gin Gin to the north-east. The nearest government secondary school is Gin Gin State High School, also in Gin Gin.
