= Skyring Reserve, Queensland =

Skyring Reserve
- Suburb
- Interactive map of Skyring Reserve
- Coordinates: 25.0427°S 151.9636°E
- Country: Australia
- State: Queensland
- LGA: Bundaberg Region
- Location: 8.1 km (5.0 mi) S of Gin Gin; 56.1 km (34.9 mi) WSW of Bundaberg CBD; 357 km (222 mi) NNW of Brisbane

Government
  - State electorate: Callide
  - Federal division: Flynn

Area
  - Total: 8.0 km^{2} (3.1 sq mi)

Population
  - Total: 47 (2021 census)
  - Density: 5.88/km^{2} (15.22/sq mi)
- Time zone: UTC+10:00 (AEST)
- Postcode: 4671
Suburbs around Skyring Reserve
Redhill Farms	Redhill Farms	McIlwraith
St Kilda	Skyring Reserve	Drinan
Wallaville	Wallaville	Wallaville

Skyring Reserve is a rural locality in the Bundaberg Region, Queensland, Australia. In the 2021 census, Skyring Reserve had a population of 47 people.

== Geography ==
The Bruce Highway enters the locality from the south-east (Wallaville) and forms the eastern boundary of the locality, before exiting to the north (Redhill Farms / McIlwraith).

The land use is a mixture of horticulture, growing sugarcane, and grazing on native vegetation. There is a cane tramway through the locality to transport the harvested sugarcane to the local sugar mill.

== History ==
Circa 1891, a block of land known as Skyring's reserve was subdivided and offered for selection.

Redbank Gully Provisional School opened on 10 October 1898. On 1 January 1909, it became Redbank Gully State School. It closed on 28 January 1963. It was at approx 33849 Bruce Highway (25.03382°S 151.97567°E).

== Demographics ==
In the 2016 census, Skyring Reserve had a population of 38 people.

In the 2021 census, Skyring Reserve had a population of 47 people.

== Education ==
There are no schools in Skyring Reserve. The nearest government primary schools are Gin Gin State School in neighbouring Gin Gin to the north and Wallaville State School in neighbouring Wallaville to the south-east. The nearest government secondary school is Gin Gin State High School, also in Gin Gin.
