= Stewart & Sons =

Australian bus company

- Parent: Ray & Les Stewart
- Commenced operation: 8 October 1948
- Headquarters: Bundaberg
- Service type: Bus services
- Depots: 1
- Fleet: 18

Stewart & Sons is an Australian bus company operating services in Bundaberg, Queensland.

== History ==
On 8 October 1948, Matthew Stewart and sons Ray and Les purchased the Bundaberg bus business of Frank Jorgensen with six buses. It operated services to South Kolan and Elliot Heads. In the early 1950s, Stewart & Sons began to build its own bodywork. Initially building for its own use only, the company soon began bodying bus chassis for other operators.

Following Matthew's death in 1986, Ray and Les took full ownership. The last chassis bodied, a RFW coach, was completed in 1988.

== Services ==
Stewart & Sons operates one route from Elliot Heads to Moore Park as part of the Translink network.

== Fleet ==
As of November 2015, Stewart & Sons operated 18 buses and coaches.
