= Moore Park Beach, Queensland =

Moore Park Beach
- Town
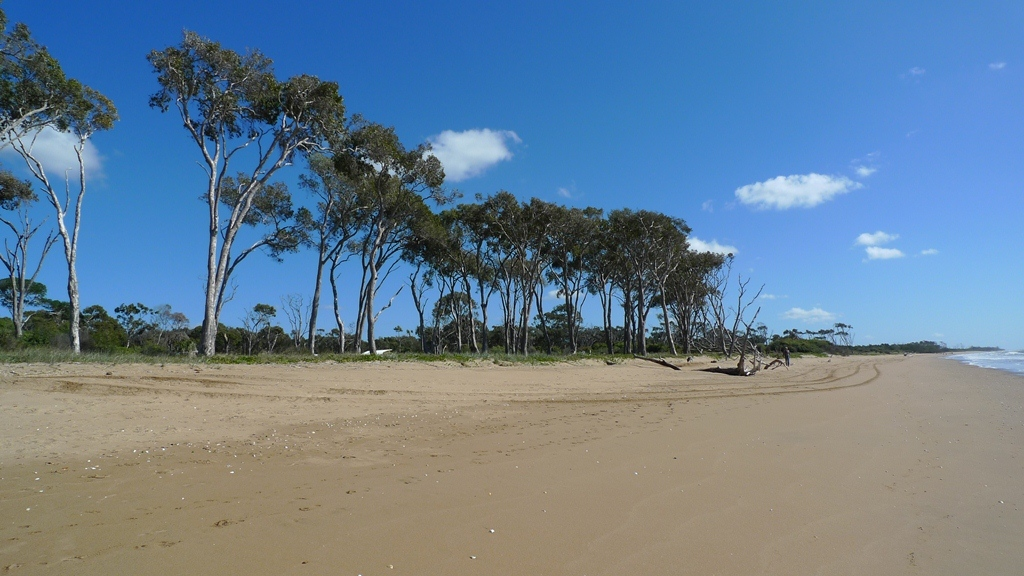
- Moore Park Beach

- Interactive map of Moore Park Beach
- Coordinates: 24.7163°S 152.275°E
- Country: Australia
- State: Queensland
- City: Moore Park
- LGA: Bundaberg Region
- Location: 23.4 km (14.5 mi) N of Bundaberg Central; 383 km (238 mi) N of Brisbane

Government
  - State electorate: Burnett
  - Federal division: Flynn

Area
  - Total: 59.0 km^{2} (22.8 sq mi)

Population
  - Totals: 2,890 (2021 census); 2,650 (2016 census town)
  - Density: 48.98/km^{2} (126.9/sq mi)
- Time zone: UTC+10:00 (AEST)
- Postcode: 4670
- Mean max temp: 26 °C (79 °F)
- Mean min temp: 20 °C (68 °F)
- Annual rainfall: 1,140 mm (45 in)
Localities around Moore Park Beach
Miara	Coral Sea	Coral Sea
Avondale	Moore Park Beach	Coral Sea
Moorland	Welcome Creek	Fairymead

Moore Park Beach is a coastal rural locality in the Bundaberg Region, Queensland, Australia. The coastal town of Moore Park is within the locality. In the 2021 census, the locality of Moore Park Beach had a population of 2,890 people.

== Geography ==
Moore Park Beach is on the Coral Sea, 23.4 kilometres (14.5 mi) by road north of the city of Bundaberg. It is bordered to the north and north-west by the Kolan River, to the south by the suburbs of Moorland and Welcome Creek, and on the east by Fairymead.

Fairydale is a neighbourhood within the south-east of the locality (24.7486°S 152.3010°E).

Moore Park Beach is a sandy beach (24.6969°S 152.2517°E) which extends the entire length of the locality's coastline and beyond to Fairymead.

The most northern part of the locality is protected within the Mouth of Kolan River Conservation Park (24.6778°S 152.2199°E). It is 784 hectares (1,940 acres).

The residential land is in two areas, the coastal strip with predominantly suburban-sized house lots and an area in the west of the locality accessed via Malvern Drive featuring larger rural residential land parcels.

The far south-east of the locality is undeveloped marshland. The remainder of the locality is used for farming, predominantly growing sugarcane.

== History ==
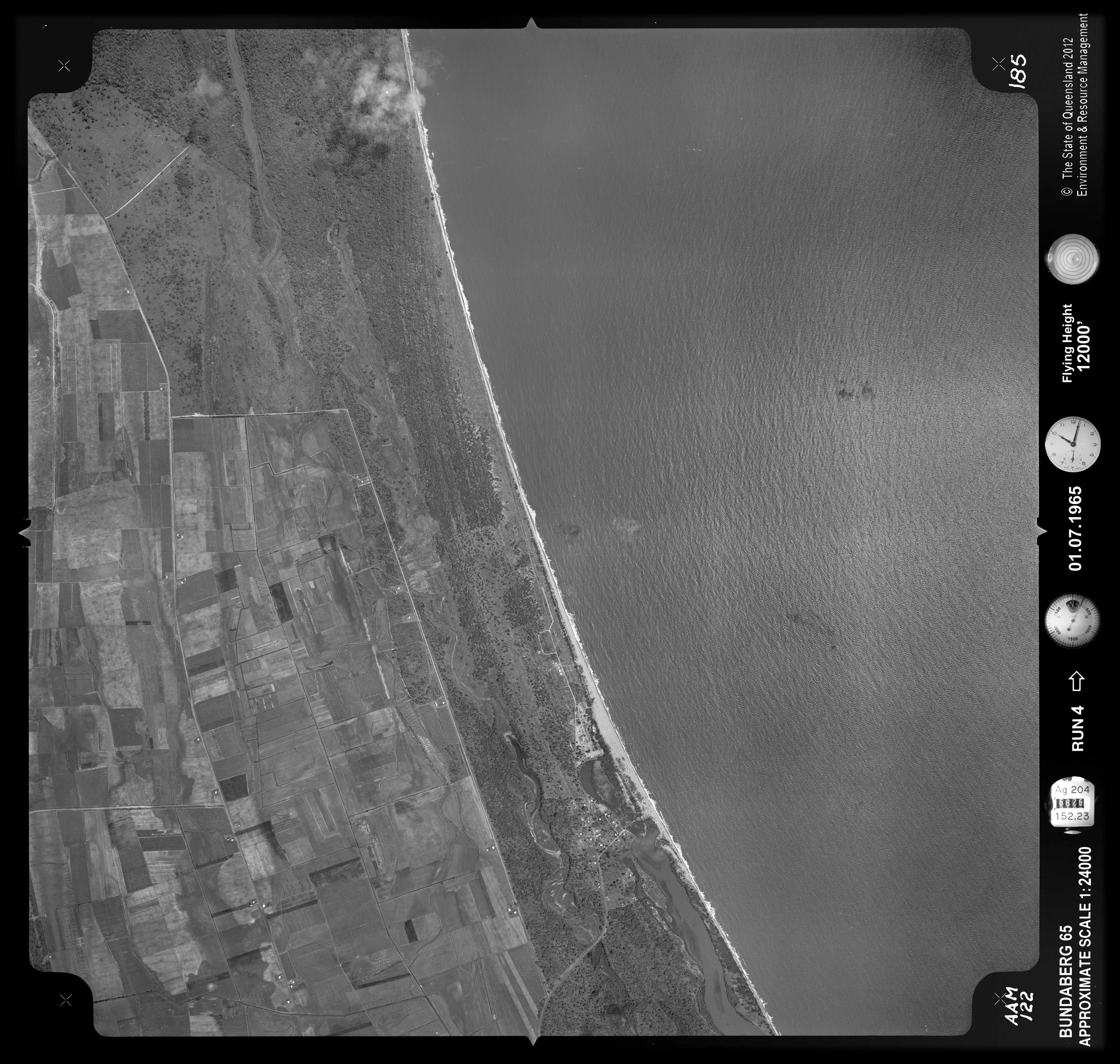
Moore Park Beach on the 1st of July 1965, shortly after the town was gazetted. Note the low population and forest cover.

On 3 January 1961, the town and locality were named by Queensland Place Names Board after grazier Isaac Moore of Barambah station in the South Burnett.

Moore Park State School opened on 1 January 2004. It was later renamed Moore Park Beach State School.

== Demographics ==
In the 2001 census, the town of Moore Park had a population of 1,279 people.

In the 2006 census, the locality of Moore Park Beach had a population of 1,599 people, of whom 26 people (1.8%) identified as Indigenous Australians. 15% of respondents were over 65 years of age. The commonest languages spoken at home were English (96%), German, Maltese, Dutch and Italian. 59.1% of residents reported Christianity as their religion, with Anglican 19.8%, Catholic 18.9%, Uniting Church 8.2%, Presbyterian & Reformed 3.3%, and Lutheran 2.7%.

In the 2016 census, the locality of Moore Park Beach had a population of 2,650 people, of whom 2,122 lived within the town of Moore Park.

In the 2021 census, the locality of Moore Park Beach had a population of 2,890 people.

== Education ==
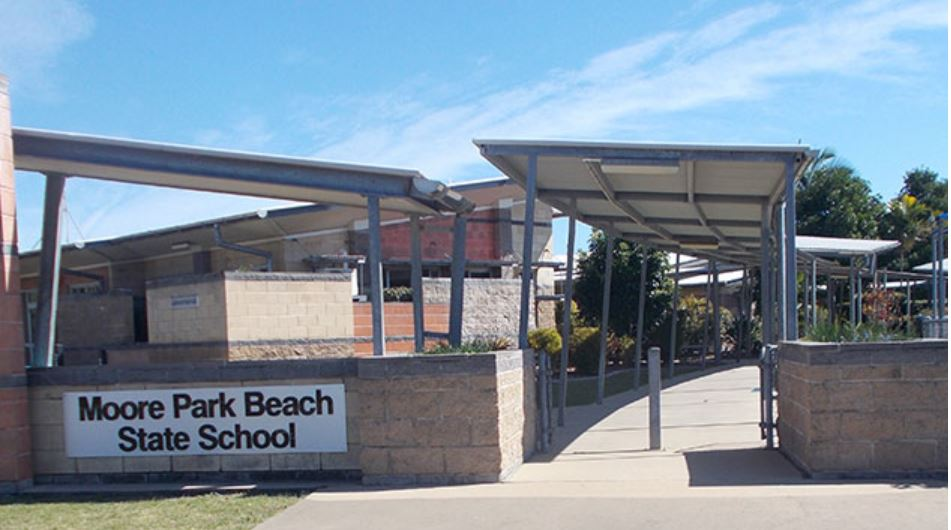
Moore Park Beach State School, 2022

Moore Park Beach State School is a government primary (Prep–6) school for boys and girls at 14 Murdochs Linking Road (24.7096°S 152.2552°E). In 2018, the school had an enrolment of 193 students with 15 teachers (12 full-time equivalent) and 14 non-teaching staff (8 full-time equivalent).

There are no secondary schools in Moore Park Beach. The nearest government secondary school is Bundaberg North State High School in North Bundaberg to the south.

== Amenities ==
There are a number of parks in the area:

- Environmental Reserve Park (24.7022°S 152.2560°E)
- Fauna And Flora Park (24.7174°S 152.2797°E)
- Industrial Park (24.7298°S 152.2849°E)
- Merv Thiele Park (24.7141°S 152.2692°E)
- Moore Park Oval (24.7162°S 152.2772°E)
- Moore Park Wetlands Reserve (24.7201°S 152.2770°E)
- Ray Townson Park (24.7055°S 152.2614°E)
- Royal Palms Estate Park (24.6942°S 152.2456°E)

== Attractions ==
Four-wheel driving is permitted in two sections of the beach, north of Sylvan Drive via Royal Palms Park (24.69308°S 152.24653°E) and south of Lassig Street (24.71771°S 152.28280°E), with access at those two locations.

Moore Park Surf Lifesaving Club is at Surf Club Drive (24.7151°S 152.2782°E). The volunteers patrol the beach to support safe swimming.

The beach is also a nesting site for sea turtles including loggerhead sea turtles in summer months.

== Transport ==
Moore Park is served by a limited bus service operated by Stewart & Sons.
