= Sharon, Queensland =

Sharon
- Suburb
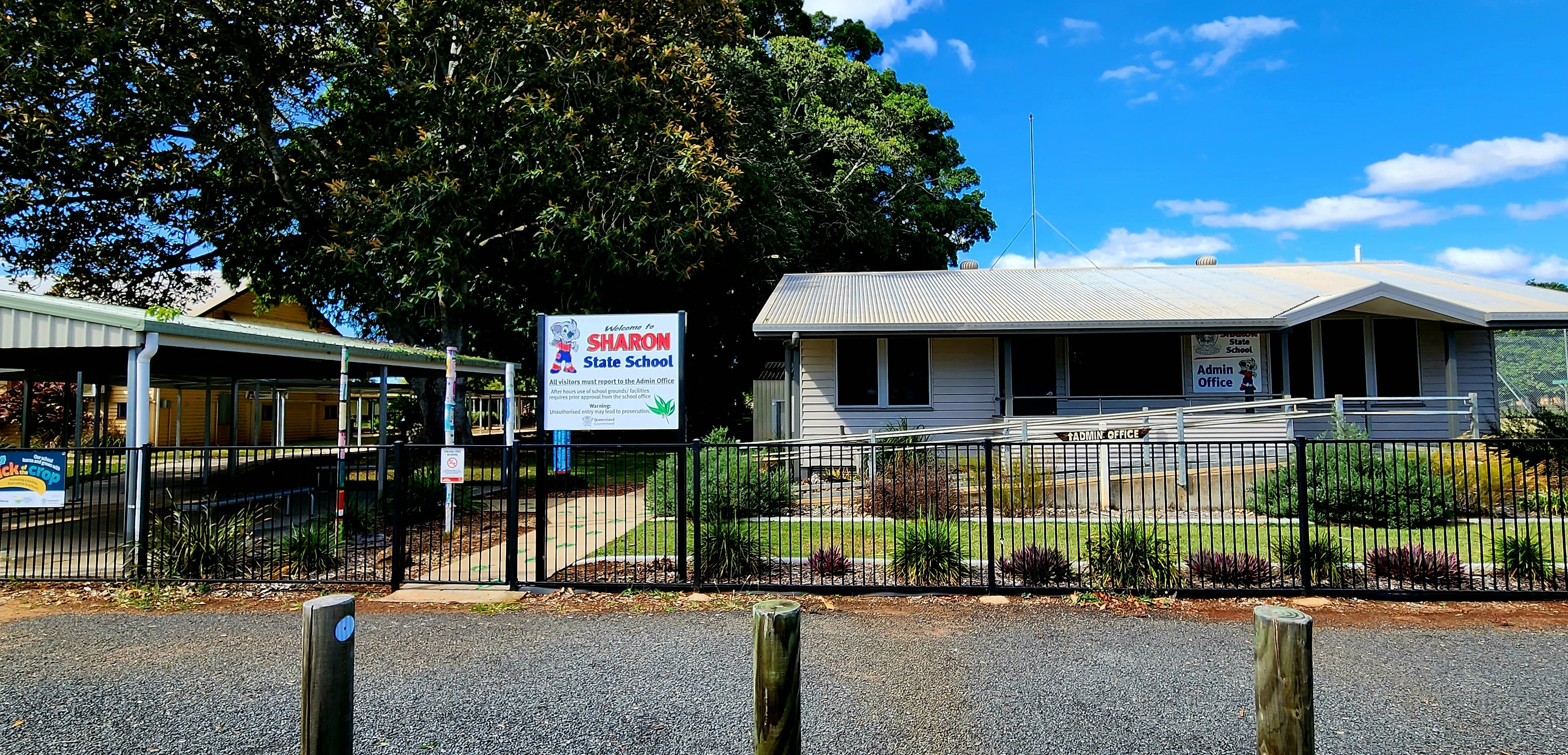
- Sharon State School, 2025

- Interactive map of Sharon
- Coordinates: 24.8761°S 152.2458°E
- Country: Australia
- State: Queensland
- City: Bundaberg
- LGA: Bundaberg Region
- Location: 11.9 km (7.4 mi) W of Bundaberg CBD; 380 km (240 mi) N of Brisbane

Government
  - State electorate: Burnett
  - Federal division: Flynn

Area
  - Total: 48.8 km^{2} (18.8 sq mi)

Population
  - Total: 1,209 (2021 census)
  - Density: 24.77/km^{2} (64.17/sq mi)
- Time zone: UTC+10:00 (AEST)
- Postcode: 4670
Suburbs around Sharon
Meadowvale	Meadowvale	Meadowvale
South Kolan	Sharon	Oakwood
South Kolan	Branyan	Avoca

Sharon is a rural locality in the Bundaberg Region, Queensland, Australia. In the 2021 census, Sharon had a population of 1,209 people.

== Geography ==
The locality is bounded to the north and east by Splitters Creek and to the south by the Burnett River.

Sharon is approximately eight kilometres west of Bundaberg towards Gin Gin. The Sharon Gorge is a further four kilometres along the highway, and is home to a tranquil area with rainforests, ferns, palms and orchids.

The neighbourhood of Manoo is located in the south-western area of Sharon (24.8833°S 152.2333°E); it takes its name from the former Manoo railway station on the now closed Mount Perry railway line. The name Manoo is an Aboriginal word meaning clear straight track.

The Bundaberg-Gin Gin Road (State Route 3) runs through from east to south.

== History ==
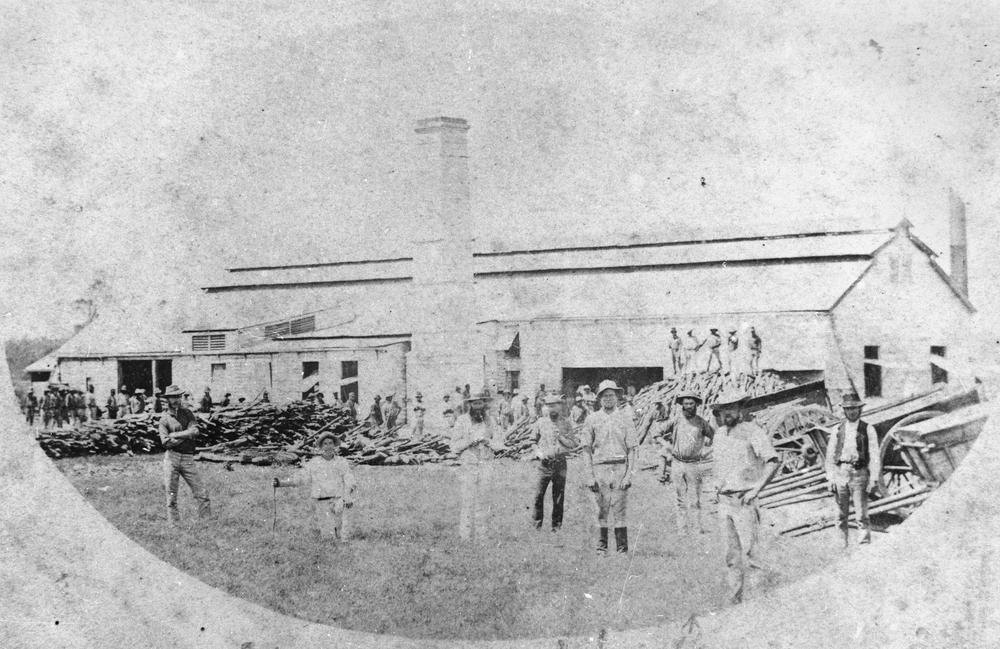
Mill workers in front of Sharon Sugar Mill, Bundaberg, circa 1890

The locality is named after the Sharon plain in Israel.

A Methodist Sunday School was established in 1882 by the Workman family which met on the verandah of the school until a church could be built. The Primitive Methodist church was officially opened on Sunday 29 March 1896 by Reverend William Powell and Reverend Tom Ellison. The church was used by the Primitive Methodists on three Sundays each month with the fourth Sunday being available to other denominations. Circa 1935, the church building was sold to the Anglican Church.

Tantitha Provisional School opened on 26 February 1883. In 1894 it became a state school and was renamed Sharon State School.

Erin Hill State School opened on 30 April 1917. It closed on 14 June 1957. It was on a 10-acre (4.0 ha) in the Splitters Creek area, now part of Sharon, at 411 Ten Mile Road (24.8546°S 152.2356°E).

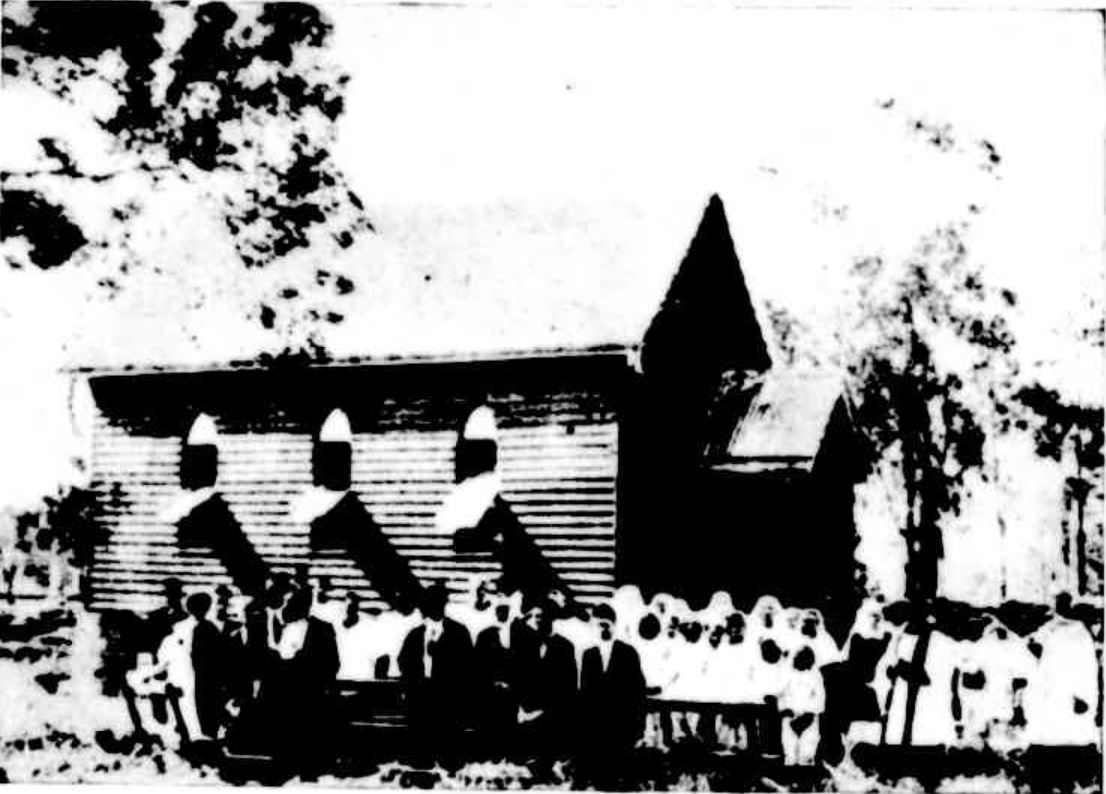
Opening of the Church of England at Sharon, circa February 1935

Circa 1935, the Anglican Church purchased the former Primitive Methodist Church building and commenced services in February 1935. St Stephen's Anglican church was dedicated on 30 April 1945 by Rural Dean Reverend N.C.C. Bertram. Its closure was approved in September 1991. The church was in Gin Gin Road roughly opposite the Sharon State School (approx 24.8723°S 152.2627°E).

== Demographics ==
In the 2011 census, Sharon had a population of 1,131 people.

In the 2016 census, Sharon had a population of 1,316 people.

In the 2021 census, Sharon had a population of 1,209 people.

== Heritage listings ==
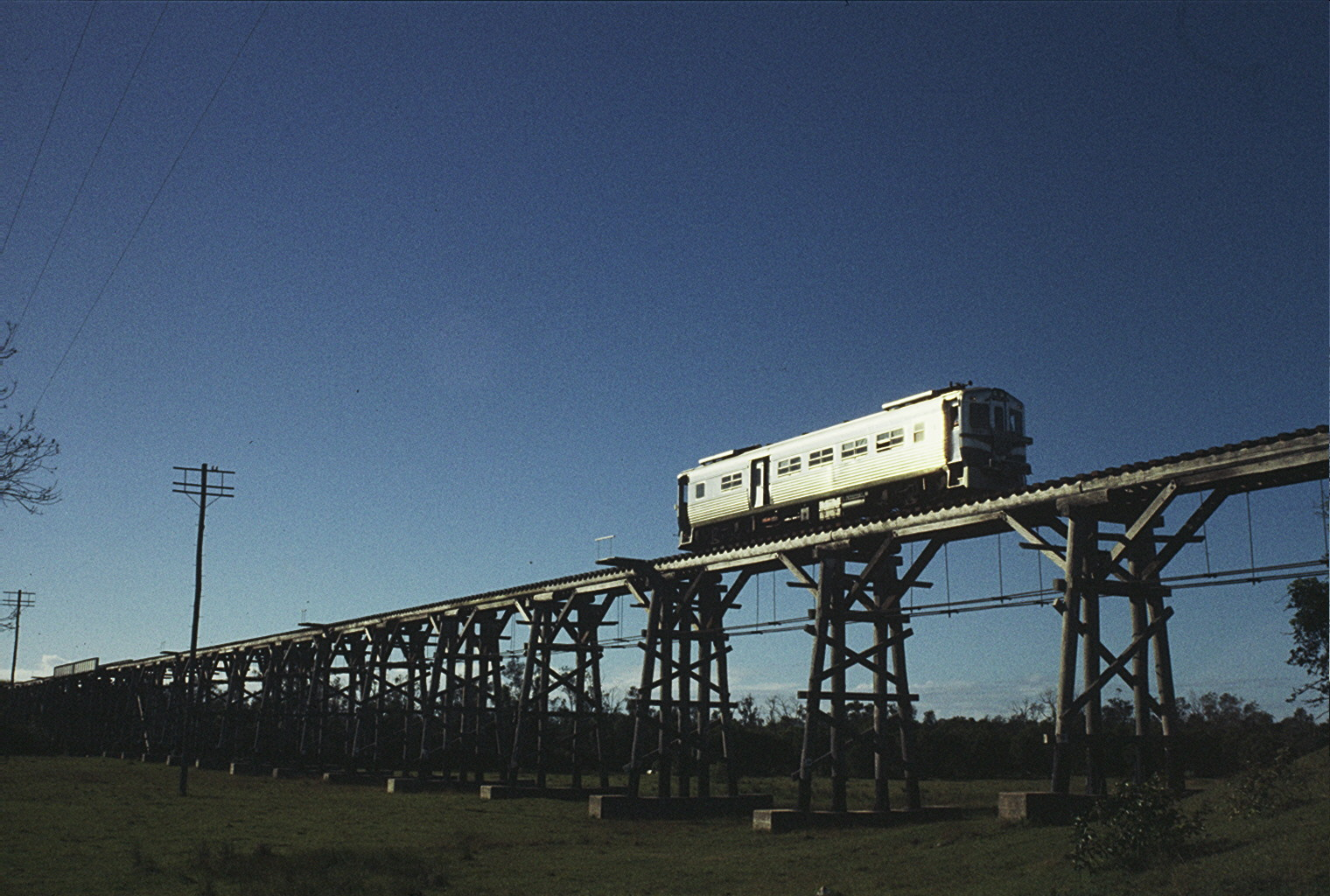
Splitters Creek Railway Bridge

Sharon has the following heritage listings:

- Splitters Creek Railway Bridge

== Education ==
Sharon State School is a government primary (Prep–6) school for boys and girls at 18 Sharon School Road (24.8724°S 152.2633°E). In 2018, the school had an enrolment of 116 students with 10 teachers (8 full-time equivalent) and 8 non-teaching staff (5 full-time equivalent).

There are no secondary schools in Sharon. The nearest government secondary school is Bundaberg North State High School in Bundaberg North to the north-east.

== Amenities ==
Sharon Public Hall is at 1016 Gin Gin Road (24.8618°S 152.2672°E).
