= Drinan, Queensland =

Drinan
- Suburb
- Interactive map of Drinan
- Coordinates: 25.0399°S 152.0191°E
- Country: Australia
- State: Queensland
- LGA: Bundaberg Region
- Location: 9.2 km (5.7 mi) SE of Gin Gin; 52.9 km (32.9 mi) SW of Bundaberg; 111 km (69 mi) NW of Hervey Bay; 370 km (230 mi) NNW of Brisbane

Government
  - State electorate: Callide
  - Federal division: Flynn

Area
  - Total: 23.7 km^{2} (9.2 sq mi)

Population
  - Total: 135 (2021 census)
  - Density: 5.70/km^{2} (14.75/sq mi)
- Time zone: UTC+10:00 (AEST)
- Postcode: 4671
Suburbs around Drinan
Redhill Farms	McIlwraith	Delan
Skyring Reserve	Drinan	Delan
Wallaville	Duingal	Duingal

Drinan is a rural locality in the Bundaberg Region, Queensland, Australia. It is 40 kilometres (25 mi) WSW of Bundaberg, and 3.6 kilometres (2.2 mi) from the north-south Bruce Highway. In the 2021 census, Drinan had a population of 135 people.

== History ==
Pastoralist M. Drinan established the European settlement of the area around Sheep Station Creek. The area became known as Drinan's Crossing. The Drinan family included one of the district's "oldest and most useful residents" and pioneers, James (d. October 1921), who cultivated grapes on Electra station in the late 1870s. (Bundaberg's Drinan Park was named in October 1921 for James Drinan.)

The Drinan railway station was named after the Drinan family by the Queensland Railways Department on 4 September 1919. The present-day bounded locality was named after the railway station in 2008.

The introduction of the Wallaville railway line by 1923 saw the purchase of lands at Drinan's Crossing for sawmilling by the enterprising businessman Adolph Ferdinand Rieck (c. 1853–December 1937); The mill was established in 1919. "Grandfather" Rieck becoming known as the "Father of Drinan". The sawmill and railway line saw thirty houses quickly appear, then a general store (stocked with groceries, footwear, ironmongery, drapery, etc.) for mill hands and nearby farmers. The industry saw the employment of fourteen mill staff, and up to sixteen teamsters. The mill timbers were supplied to sugar mills in the Mackay district, and also used in the construction of Wallaville's Catholic Church.

The area at this time saw the cultivation of sugar cane, lucerne, potatoes, and small crops.

Drinan Provisional School opened in February 1927 (official opening celebrations in late May 1927), after protests the Berrembea school 4 miles (6.4 km) away was too far to walk for children. Rieck's sawmill supplied the 2 acres (0.81 ha) site, timber, and erection for free, as the government would not provide such; and became the 30 by 24 feet (9.1 m × 7.3 m) Drinan Hall. Initial numbers were 28 students (with Berrembea having 22). The school was conducted from the hall, which was also designed to function for dances, religious purposes, and picture shows, which was enlarged by September 1927. On Friday, 1 February 1952 the hall was blown down in a bad storm. Approval was given in March 1952 to establish an actual state school, which would need to be constructed.

A bridge was surveyed for Drinan's Crossing over the Burnett River by 1929, and the same time as motor vehicles were introduced to the area.

Even impacted by the 1936–1937 drought, the Drinan district was considered to have the highest pastoral and agricultural productivity of the area, with beef cattle, dairy cattle, pigs, sugar cane, lucerne, and cereal and root crops, separate to the sawmill industry. Sugar cane was processed at the Wallaville mill, with over 2600 tons shopped by the rail line in 1939.

In 1954, the provincial school became the Drinan State School. The school closed in 1963. The site was on Berrembea Road to the south-east of the railway station (25.04733°S 152.02251°E).

In December 2025, with a major farm in Drinan, a national salad grower agricultural business went into liquidation. Concern was for the now-unemployed local workers, backpackers, and Pacific Australia Labour Mobility (PALM) scheme workers.

== Demographics ==
In the 2016 census, Drinan had a population of 170 people.

In the 2021 census, Drinan had a population of 135 people.

== Education ==
There are no current schools in Drinan. The nearest government primary schools are Wallaville State School in neighbouring Wallaville to the south-west, Gin Gin State School in Gin Gin to the north-west, and McIlwraith State School in neighbouring McIlwraith to the north. The nearest government secondary school is Gin Gin State High School, also in Gin Gin to the north-west.
