= Booyal, Queensland =

Booyal
- Town
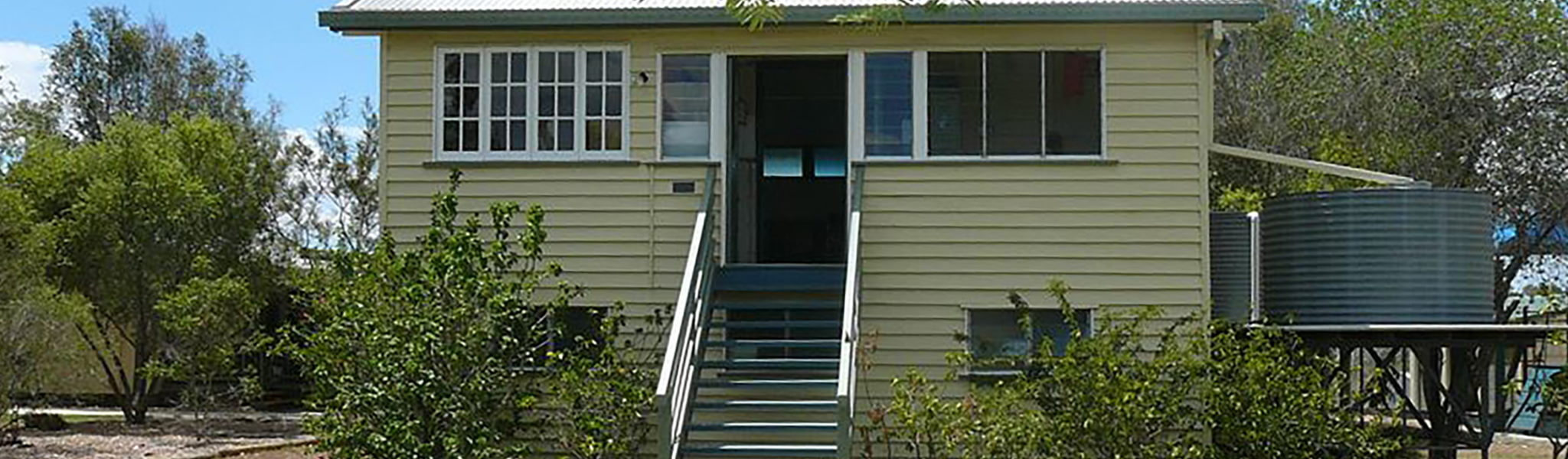
- Booyal Central State School, 2024

- Interactive map of Booyal
- Coordinates: 25.2097°S 152.0405°E
- Country: Australia
- State: Queensland
- LGA: Bundaberg Region
- Location: 26.7 km (16.6 mi) W of Childers; 28.9 km (18.0 mi) S of Gin Gin; 496 km (308 mi) WSW of Bundaberg Central; 338 km (210 mi) NNW of Brisbane

Government
  - State electorate: Burnett
  - Federal division: Hinkler

Area
  - Total: 255.8 km^{2} (98.8 sq mi)

Population
  - Total: 285 (2021 census)
  - Density: 1.1142/km^{2} (2.886/sq mi)
- Postcode: 4671
Localities around Booyal
Duingal	Duingal	Cordalba; Promisedland
Dallarnil; Morganville	Booyal	Isis Central
Good Night	Golden Fleece	Eureka

Booyal is a rural town and locality in the Bundaberg Region, Queensland, Australia. In the 2021 census, the locality of Booyal had a population of 285 people.

== Geography ==
The Burnett River forms the western boundary of the locality and the Gregory River, a tributary of the Isis River, runs through the location from south to north to the east of the Burnett River.

The Bruce Highway passes from the east to the north-west through the locality.

== History ==
Booyal is believed to be an Aboriginal word, indicating south direction.

Booyal Provisional School opened about May 1905. It became Booyal State School on 1 January 1909. It closed in 1933.

Booyal Central State School opened on 20 November 1916. It celebrated its centenary in November 2016.

== Demographics ==
In the 2016 census, the locality of Booyal had a population of 275 people.

In the 2021 census, the locality of Booyal had a population of 285 people.

== Education ==
Booyal Central State School is a government primary (Prep-6) school for boys and girls at 31620 Bruce Highway (25.2094°S 152.0324°E). In 2016, it had an enrolment of 24 students with 2 teachers and 4 non-teaching staff (2 equivalent full-time). In 2023, the school had an enrolment of 9 students.

There are no secondary schools in Booyal. The nearest government secondary schools are Isis District State High School in Childers and Gin Gin State High School in Gin Gin.
