= Oakwood, Queensland =

Oakwood
- Suburb
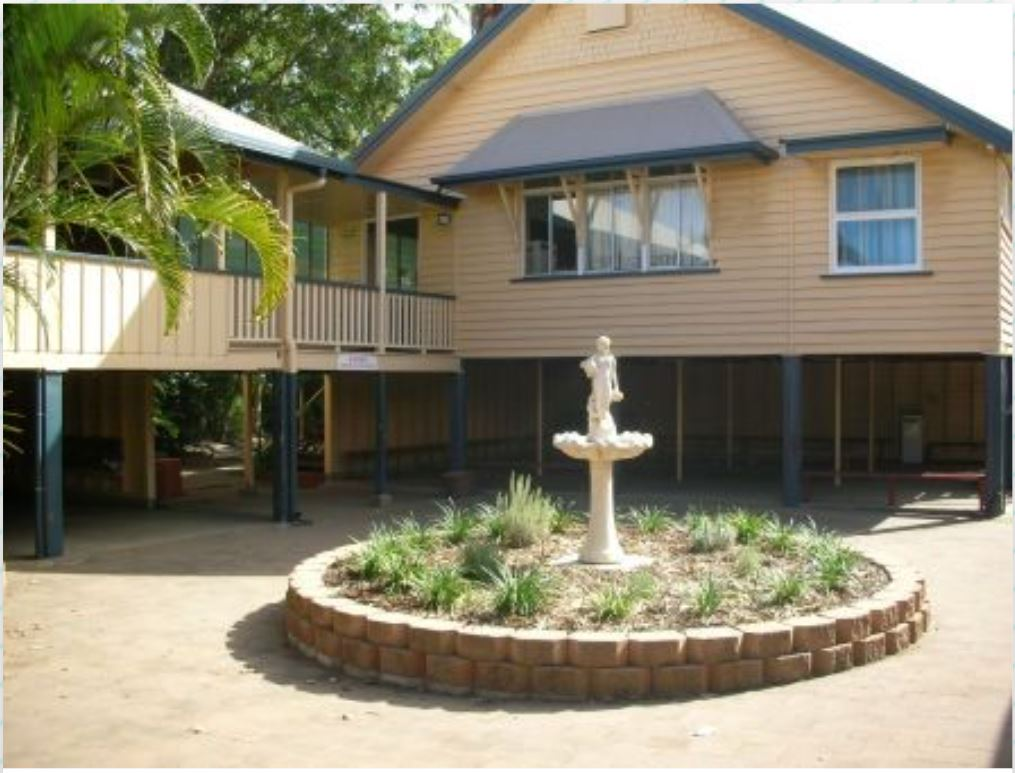
- Oakwood State School, 2024

- Interactive map of Oakwood
- Coordinates: 24.8486°S 152.2980°E
- Country: Australia
- State: Queensland
- LGA: Bundaberg Region
- Location: 6.3 km (3.9 mi) NE of Bundaberg CBD; 281 km (175 mi) SE of Rockhampton; 367 km (228 mi) N of Brisbane

Government
  - State electorate: Burnett
  - Federal division: Flynn

Area
  - Total: 11.6 km^{2} (4.5 sq mi)
- Elevation: 21.6 m (71 ft)

Population
  - Total: 364 (2021 census)
  - Density: 31.38/km^{2} (81.3/sq mi)
- Time zone: UTC+10:00 (AEST)
- Postcode: 4670
- Annual rainfall: 1,010 mm (40 in)
Suburbs around Oakwood
Meadowvale	Meadowvale	Gooburrum
Sharon	Oakwood	Bundaberg North
Sharon	Avoca	Millbank

Oakwood is a rural locality in the Bundaberg Region, Queensland, Australia. In the 2021 census, Oakwood had a population of 364 people.

== Geography ==
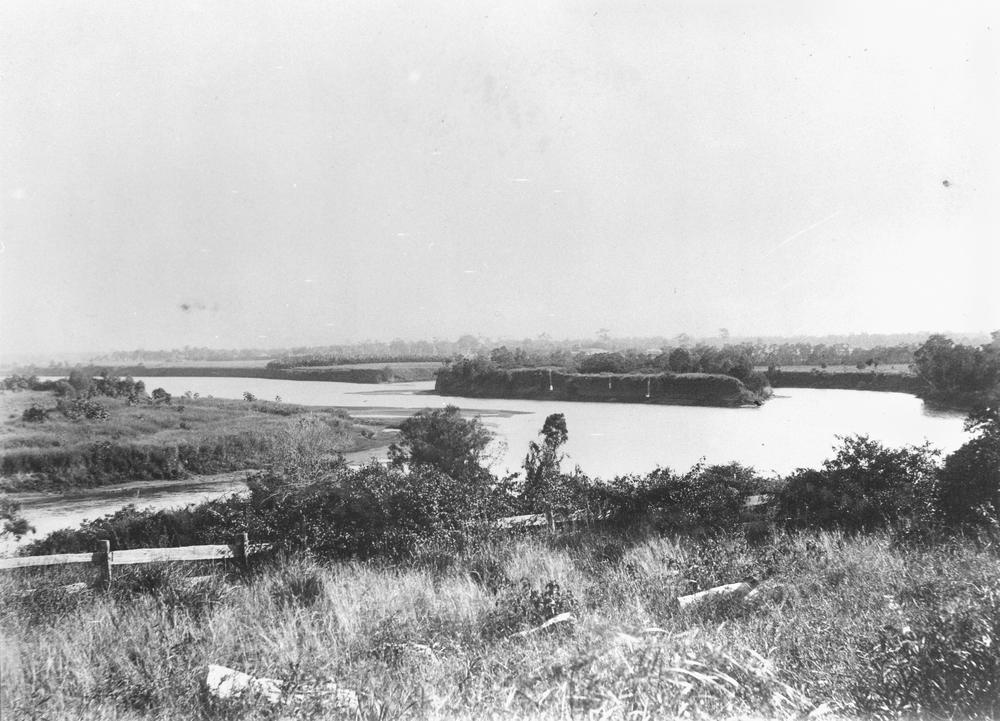
Burnett River, near Oakwood Sugar Mill ca.1909

Oakwood is bounded on the south by the Burnett River and on the west by Splitters Creek. The North Coast railway line forms its north-eastern border, but no railway stations serve the locality.

Camp Island (24.8648°S 152.2989°E) in the Burnett River is within the locality's borders.

The land use is mostly agricultural, involving irrigated cropping and some grazing. Unlike many farming areas near Bundaberg, sugarcane is growing in Oakwood but not as the predominant crop.

The Bundaberg-Gin Gin Road (State Route 3) runs through from east to west, and the Bundaberg-Miriam Vale Road exits to the north.

=== Climate ===
Oakwood has a subtropical climate with wet, hot summers and mild winters. The annual rainfall of Oakwood is about 1010 mm. The most rain received by Oakwood in a day was 258 mm. The most rain received by Oakwood in a September day was around 125 mm.

== History ==
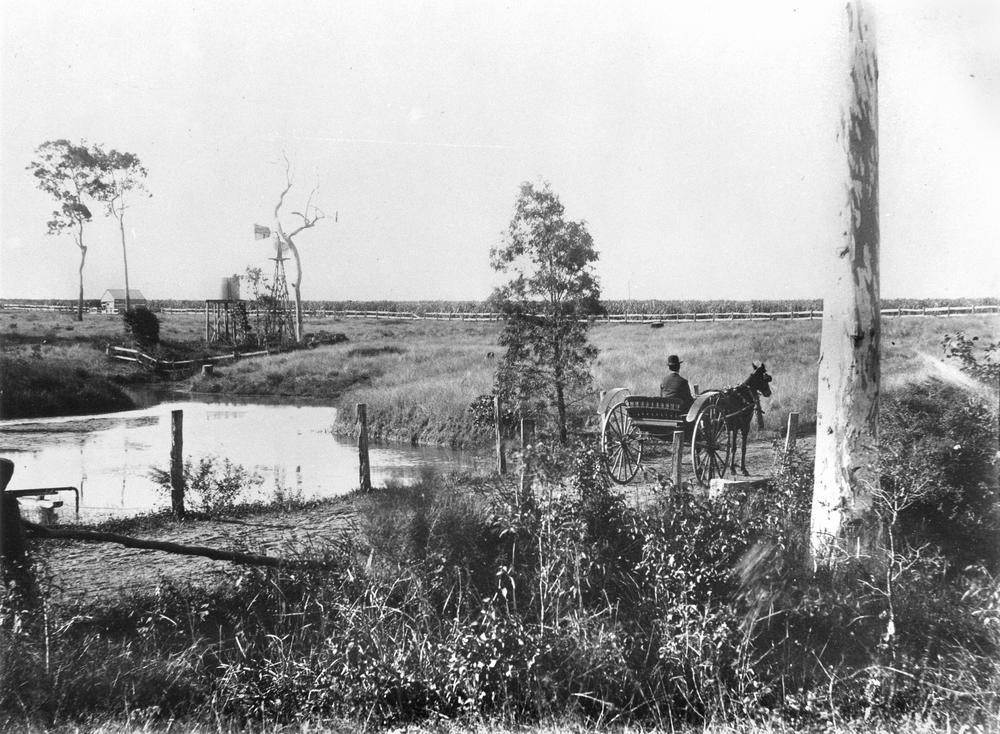
Dam and canefields, Oakwood Sugar Mill ca.1909

A church had been established by 1909 and had been offered to the Presbyterian Church on the condition they held regular services. Presbyterian services were conducted there until at least 1923. At some later time, the Methodist Church bought the church and replaced it with a new church in 1936. The Methodists operated the church until at least 1976.

Oakwood State School opened on 24 March 1924 under head teacher James Whalley. The school celebrated its centenary in 2024.

== Demographics ==
In the 2011 census, Oakwood had a population of 341 people.

In the 2016 census, Oakwood had a population of 331 people.

In the 2021 census, Oakwood had a population of 364 people.

== Heritage listings ==
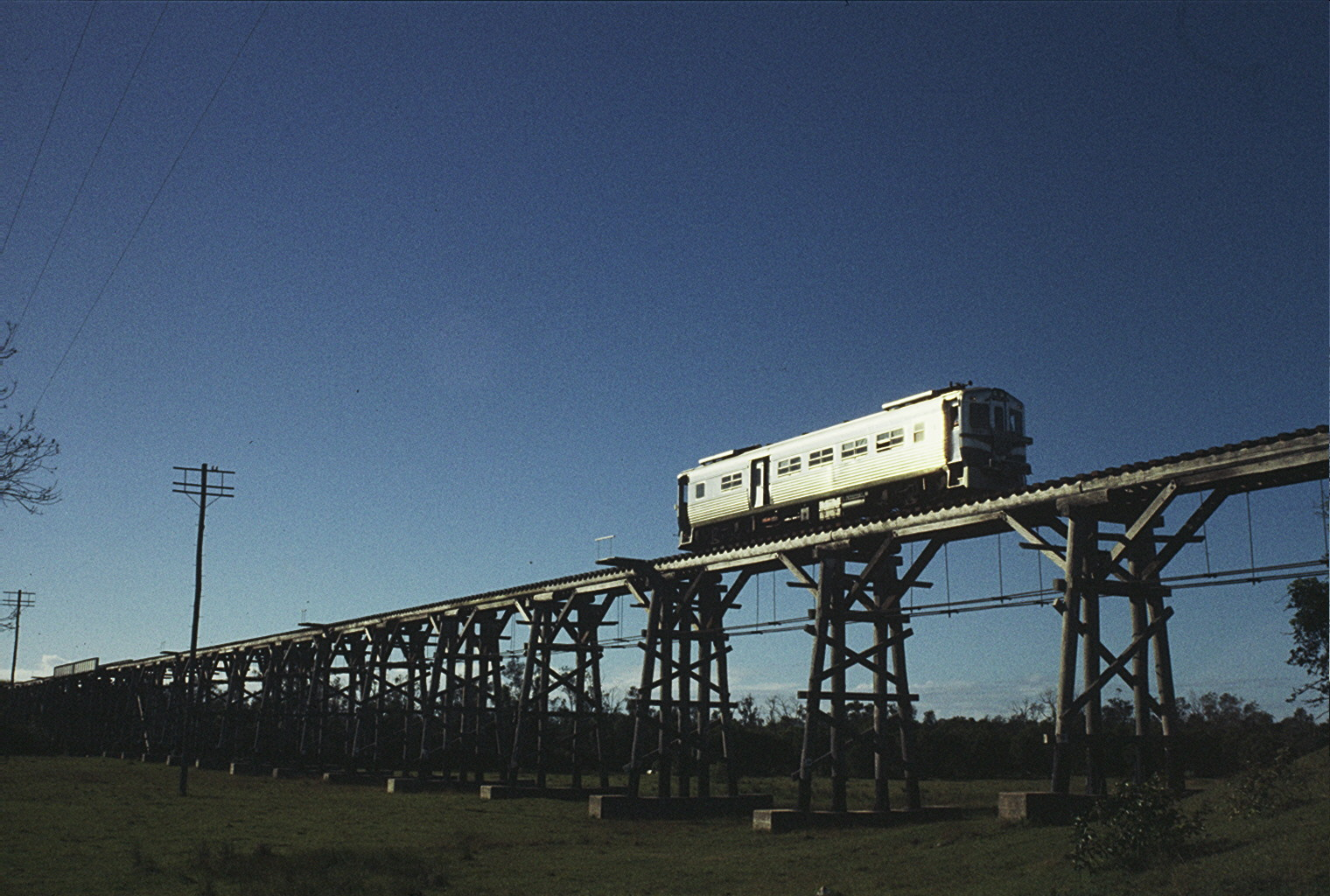
Splitters Creek Railway Bridge

Oakwood has the following heritage listings:

- Splitters Creek Railway Bridge (24.8628°S 152.2859°E)

== Education ==
Oakwood State School is a government primary (Prep–6) school for boys and girls at 125 Oakwood School Road (24.8445°S 152.3004°E). In 2017, the school had an enrolment of 101 students with 7 teachers (6 full-time equivalent) and 10 non-teaching staff (5 full-time equivalent). In 2018, the school had an enrolment of 115 students with 9 teachers (7 full-time equivalent) and 9 non-teaching staff (5 full-time equivalent).

There is no secondary school in Oakwood. The nearest government secondary school is Bundaberg North State High School in neighbouring Bundaberg North to the east.

== Amenities ==
The Oakwood Community Church is a non-denominational church at 544 Gin Gin Road (24.8510°S 152.3068°E). It is affiliated with the Christian Community Churches of Australia. Oakwood's Queensland Country Women's Association hall is immediately adjacent to the west at 548 Gin Gin Road (24.8508°S 152.3064°E).

The Oakwood State School also serves as a place where the local families gather.

The Oakwood branch of the Queensland Country Women's Association meets at the Kenmore Library at the CWA Hall at 550 Mount Perry Road.

== Sport ==
- Oakwood Park Golf Club
- Burnett Wide Bay Regional Appaloosa Club Inc: the club holds its meetings in the Oakwood QCWA Hall.

== Tourism ==
Oakwood Caravan Park, provides accommodation with caravan berths and cabins for rent.

SSS Strawberries is a strawberry farm that has a strawberry shop and opportunities to pick-your-own strawberries.
