= Gooburrum, Queensland =

Gooburrum Queensland
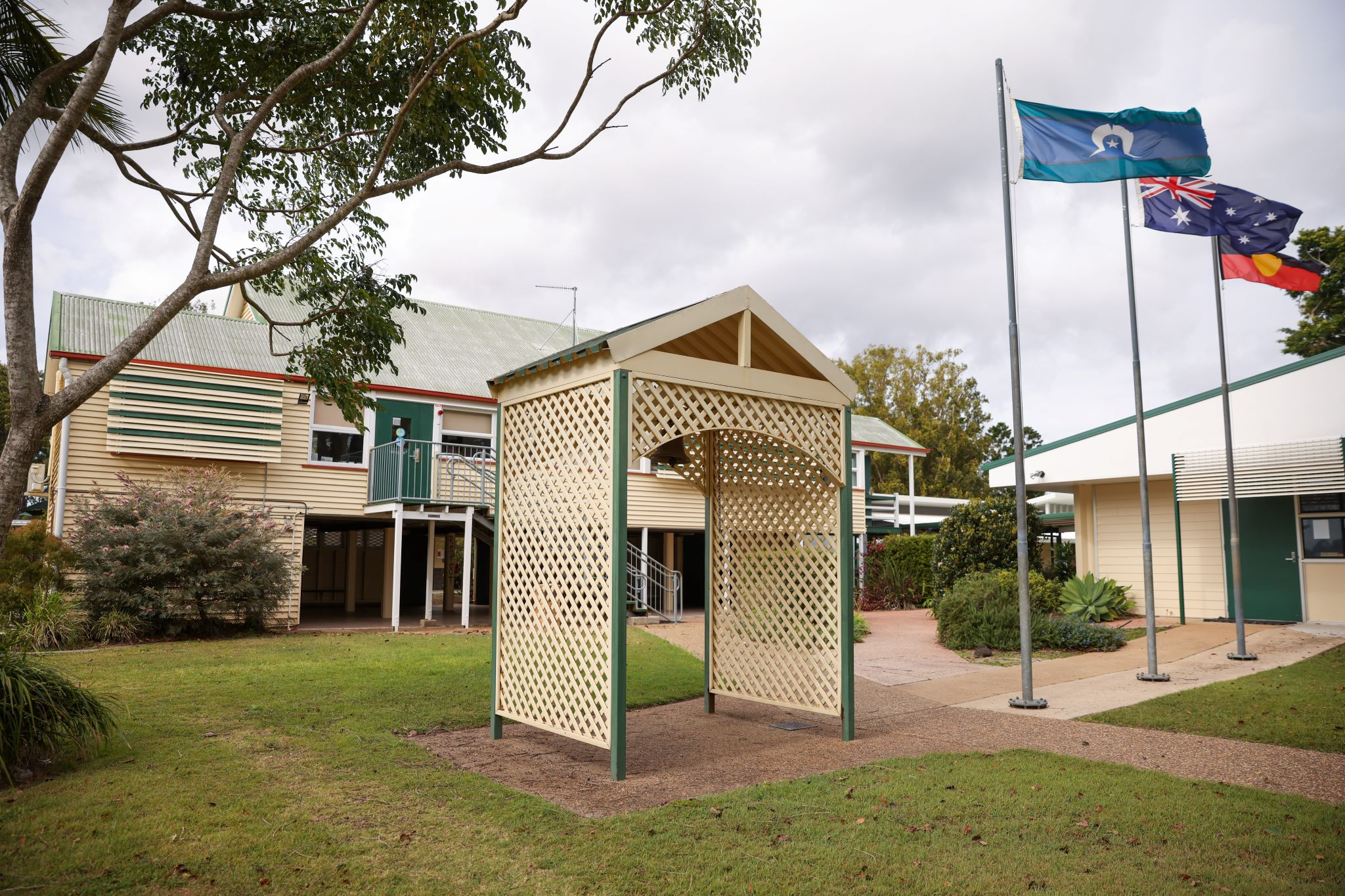
- Gooburrum State School, 2025.

- Coordinates: 24.8222°S 152.3216°E
- Population: 1,518 (2021 census)
  - Density: 56.22/km^{2} (145.6/sq mi)
- Postcode(s): 4670
- Area: 27.0 km^{2} (10.4 sq mi)
- Time zone: AEST (UTC+10:00)
- Location: 7.8 km (5 mi) NW of Bundaberg CBD; 366 km (227 mi) N of Brisbane
- LGA(s): Bundaberg Region
- State electorate(s): Burnett; Bundaberg
- Federal division(s): Flynn; Hinkler
Suburbs around Gooburrum:
Meadowvale	Welcome Creek	Fairymead
Oakwood	Gooburrum	Rubyanna
Oakwood	Bundaberg North	Kalkie

Gooburrum is a rural locality in the Bundaberg Region, Queensland, Australia. In the 2021 census, Gooburrum had a population of 1,518 people. The neighbourhood of Tantitha is within the locality (24.8153°S 152.3511°E).

== Geography ==
The Burnett River forms a small part of the eastern boundary.

== History ==
St Mark's Anglican Church opened in 1880. It closed on 15 February 2020 following a service conducted by Bishop Jeremy Greaves, the Bishop of the Northern Region of the Brisbane Diocese. St Mark's Anglican Church is at 1280 Moore Park Road (24.8199°S 152.3026°E). The church's bell was donated by Misses M and V Aiken of "Rutherglen", where it has been used to summon the Kanaka labourers.

In 1887, 12,000 acres (4,900 ha) of land were resumed from the Tantitha pastoral run. The land was offered for selection for the establishment of small farms on 17 April 1887.

Gooburrum State School opened on 3 March 1884.

== Demographics ==
In the 2016 census, Gooburrum had a population of 1,442 people. In the 2021 census, it had a population of 1,518 people.

== Education ==
Gooburrum State School is a government primary (Prep-6) school for boys and girls at 14 Gooburrum Road (24.8227°S 152.3059°E). In 2017, the school had an enrolment of 132 students with 8 teachers (7 full-time equivalent) and 7 non-teaching staff (5 full-time equivalent).

There are no secondary schools in Gooburrum. The nearest government secondary school is Bundaberg North State High School in neighbouring Bundaberg North to the south.

== See also ==
- Shire of Gooburrum
