= Fairymead, Queensland =

Fairymead
- Suburb
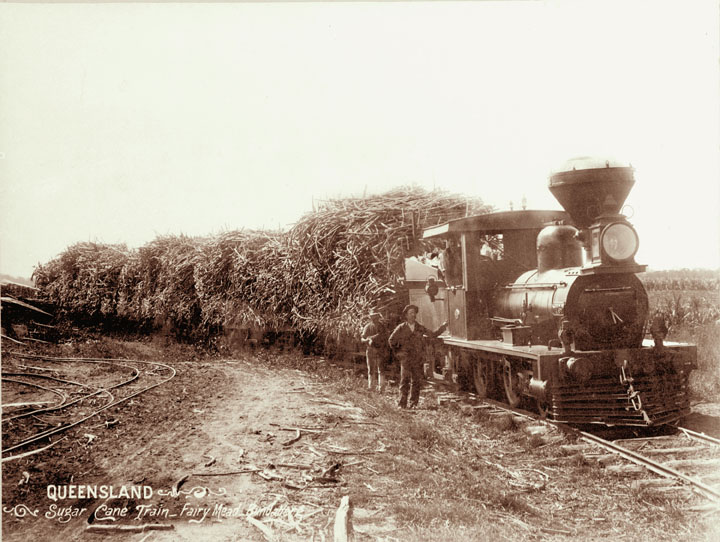
- Sugarcane train, Fairy Mead, circa 1896

- Interactive map of Fairymead
- Coordinates: 24.7713°S 152.3533°E
- Country: Australia
- State: Queensland
- LGA: Bundaberg Region
- Location: 7.5 km (4.7 mi) N of Bundaberg North; 10.1 km (6.3 mi) N of Bundaberg CBD; 472 km (293 mi) N of Brisbane

Government
  - State electorate: Burnett
  - Federal division: Flynn

Area
  - Total: 63.0 km^{2} (24.3 sq mi)

Population
  - Total: 28 (2021 census)
  - Density: 0.444/km^{2} (1.151/sq mi)
- Time zone: UTC+10:00 (AEST)
- Postcode: 4670
Suburbs around Fairymead
Moore Park Beach	Coral Sea	Coral Sea
Welcome Creek	Fairymead	Burnett Heads
Gooburrum	Rubyanna	Rubyanna

Fairymead is a coastal locality in the Bundaberg Region, Queensland, Australia. In the 2021 census, Fairymead had a population of 28 people.

== Geography ==
Fairymead is bounded to the north and north-east by the Coral Sea and to east and south-east by the Burnett River.

Barubbra Island is an island at the mouth of the Burnett River (24.7488°S 152.3861°E). It is a wetland area protected within the Barubbra Island Conservation Park.

The predominant land use is growing sugarcane. There is a cane tramway network through the locality to transport the harvested sugarcane to local sugar mills.

== History ==
Fairymead was originally established as the Fairymead Sugar Plantation with its associated Fairymead Sugar Mill (24.7898°S 152.3568°E). The heritage-listed house built by the plantation owners, Fairymead House, has been relocated to the Bundaberg Botanic Gardens.

Fairymead Provisional School opened on 20 July 1893. On 1 January 1909 it became Fairymead State School. It closed in 1983. It was located at the eastern end of Colvins Road (approx 24.8094°S 152.3484°E).

== Demographics ==
In the 2016 census, Fairymead had a population of 33 people.

In the 2021 census, Fairymead had a population of 28 people.

== Education ==
There are no schools in Fairymead. The nearest government primary schools are Moore Park Beach State School in neighbouring Moore Park Beach to the north-west, Gooburrum State School in neighbouring Gooburrum to the south-west, and Bundaberg North State School in Bundaberg North to the south. The nearest government secondary school is Bundaberg North State High School in Bundaberg North.

== See also ==
- List of tramways in Queensland
