= Wallaville =

- Town
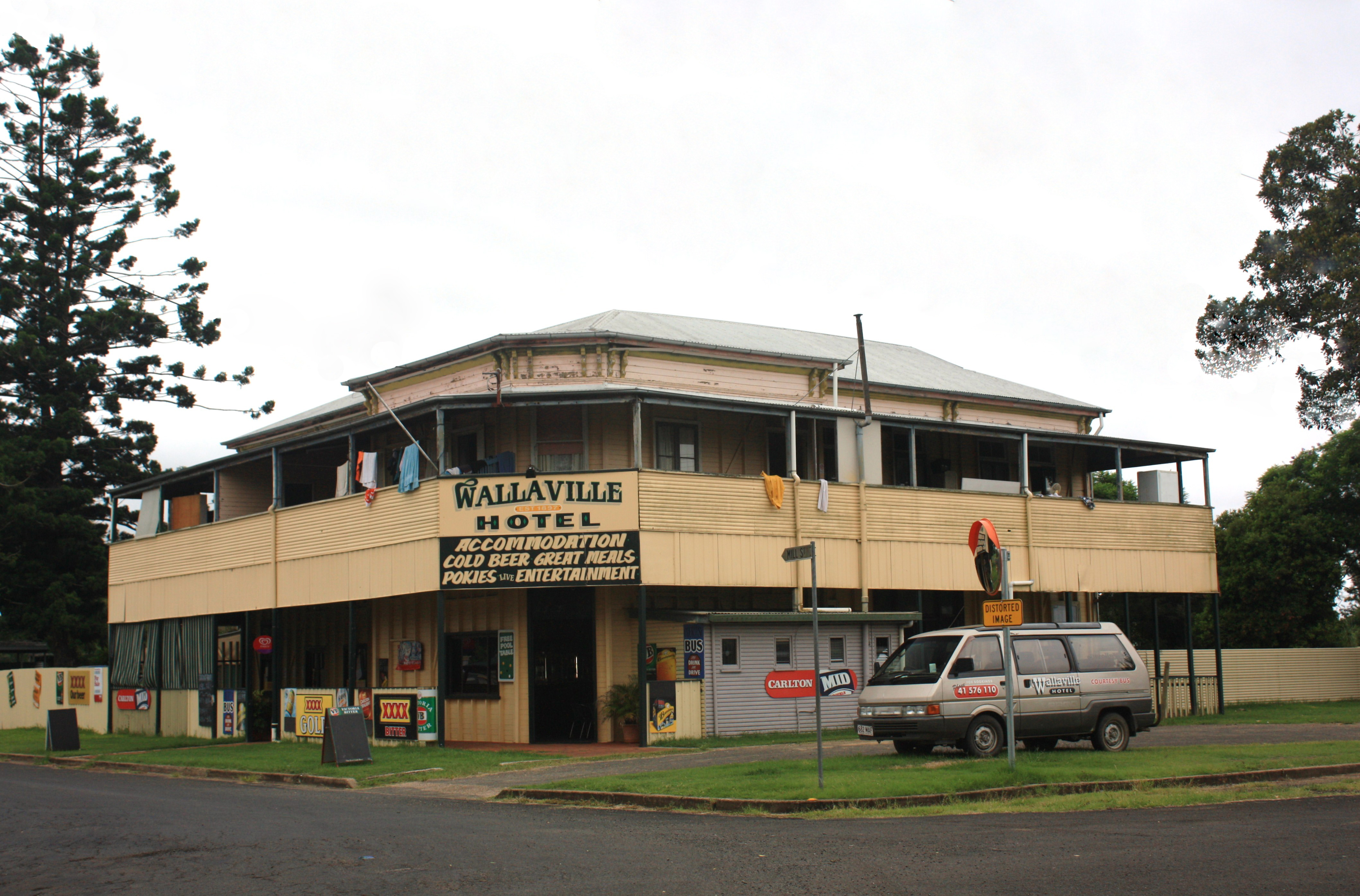
- Wallaville Hotel

- Interactive map of Wallaville
- Coordinates: 25.0730°S 151.9958°E
- Country: Australia
- State: Queensland
- LGA: Bundaberg Region
- Location: 12.6 km (7.8 mi) S of Gin Gin; 53.6 km (33.3 mi) SW of Bundaberg; 351 km (218 mi) N of Brisbane

Government
  - State electorate: Callide
  - Federal division: Flynn

Area
  - Total: 64.9 km^{2} (25.1 sq mi)

Population
  - Total: 363 (2021 census)
  - Density: 5.593/km^{2} (14.486/sq mi)
- Time zone: UTC+10:00 (AEST)
- Postcode: 4671
Localities around Wallaville
St Kilda	Skyring Reserve	Drinan
Horse Camp	Wallaville	Duingal
St Agnes	St Agnes	Duingal

Wallaville is a rural town and locality in the Bundaberg Region, Queensland, Australia. It is 372 kilometres (231 mi) north of the state capital, Brisbane and 43 kilometres (27 mi) south west of the regional centre of Bundaberg. In the 2021 census, the locality of Wallaville had a population of 363 people.

== Geography ==
Currajong Creek runs through the town, flowing into the Burnett River, which forms most of the eastern boundary of the locality. The creek is also known for the Ceratodus lung fish found in quite large numbers.

The Bruce Highway passes from south to north through Wallaville.

== History ==
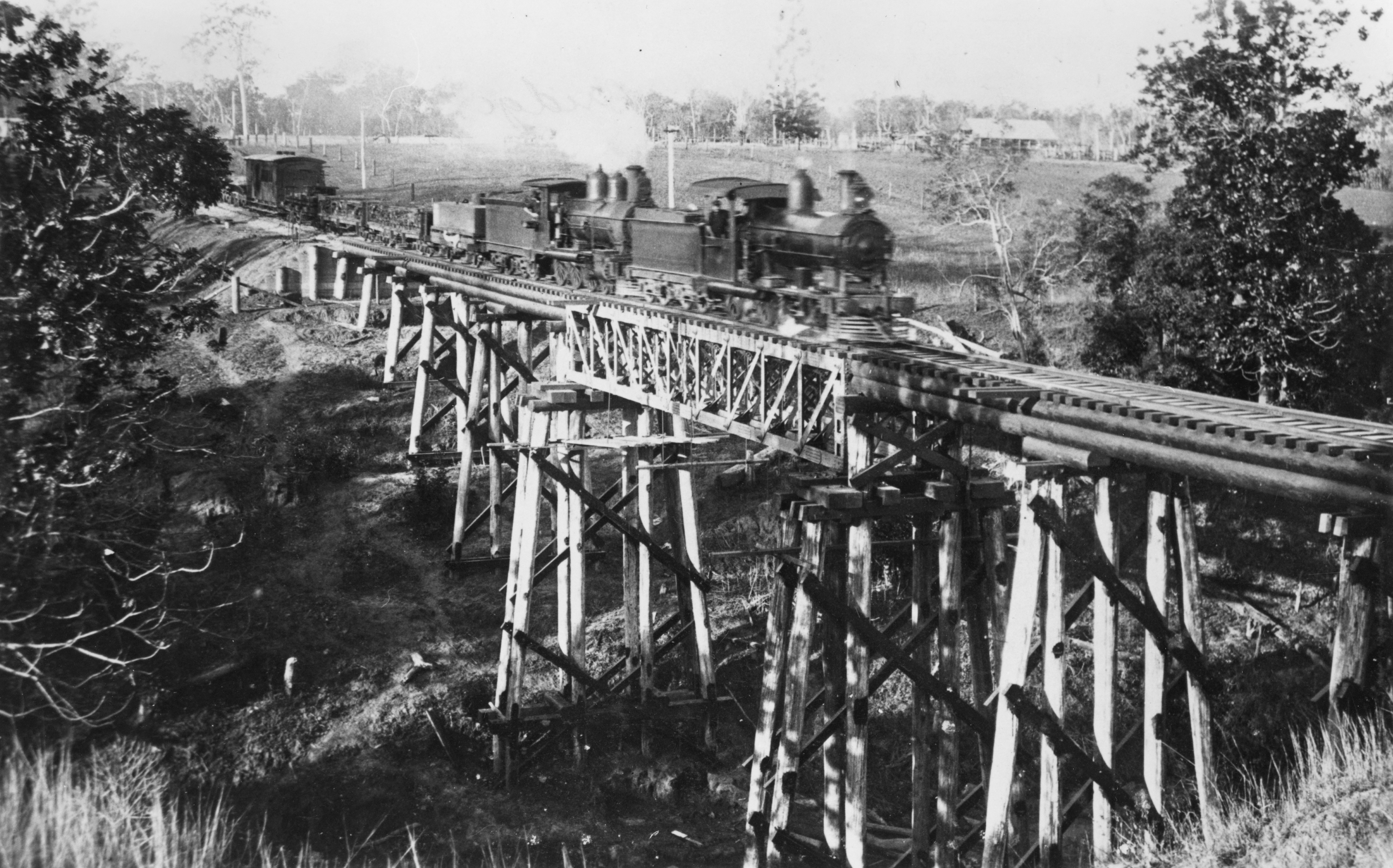
Boundary Creek Bridge on the Wallaville railway line, 1920

Walla Provisional School opened circa 1883 and closed circa 1893.

Currajong Creek Provisional School opened on 3 November 1884. In 1892, it was renamed Cumonju Provisional School. On 1 January 1909, it became Cumonju State School. It closed in 1967. It was on Ferry Hills Road (25.06104°S 151.95316°E).

In 1887, 39,000 acres (16,000 ha) of land were resumed from the Walla pastoral run. The land was offered for selection for the establishment of small farms on 17 April 1887.

In 1896, the Gin Gin co-operative sugar mill opened at Wallaville. During the cane crushing season from July to December the population of the town doubled with an influx of mill workers and cane cutters.

Ferry Hills Provisional School opened on 11 April 1904 and closed in 1956. On 1 January 1909, it became Ferry Hills State School. It closed in 1956. It was at 576 Ferry Hills Road (25.08367°S 151.92514°E).

Wallaville State School opened on 22 November 1909.

The Wallaville railway line was opened in 1920 and connected Wallaville with Goondoon on the Mount Perry railway line and then via North Bundaberg railway station to the North Coast railway line. The line was built to transport sugar cane and timber.

In 1929, an existing cane train bridge over the Burnett River was converted to be suitable for use by cars. As well as being convenient for local use, it also allowed those travelling between Brisbane and Rockhampton to bypass Bundaberg, which shortened the journey by 80 miles (130 km). It was funded by a local committee and was officially opened on 12 October 1929 by the Member for Burrum William Brand. The bridge proved popular but soon the maintenance costs become too much for the local volunteers to fund so in 1934 they sought financial assistance from the local Isis Shire Council. However, as the other side of the Burnett River was in the Kolan Shire, the Isis Shire Council sought to spread the cost across both shires. This lead in 1934 to a request to the Queensland Government to fund a new more permanent road bridge. While the issue of funding remained unresolved, the lack of maintenance was taking its toll with the bridge and its approaches being described as "a bit of a nightmare" with recommendations to drive via Bundaberg instead. The Queensland Government approved £11,825 for the construction of a new bridge in September 1938; however, construction was delayed due to a shortage of steel. The bridge was finally opened on Saturday 11 May 1940 by Harry Bruce, the Queensland Minister for Public Works, who outlined his vision for a highway from Coolangatta to Cooktown (of which the present day Bruce Highway from Brisbane to Cairns forms the major part). The new Wallaville bridge was a low-level concrete bridge 690 feet (210 m) long (25.0853°S 151.9949°E).

On Sunday 13 September 1931 Archbibhop James Duhig laid the foundation stone for the Little Flower Catholic Church in Wallaville. On Sunday 5 June 1932 the Bishop of Rockhampton Romuald Denis Hayes consecrated the new Roman Catholic Church. The church was at 2 Ryan Street (25.0736°S 151.9968°E). By 2013 the church had closed and there was a controversial proposal to convert it into a 16-bed backpacker hostel.

In the 1950s, a new bulk sugar terminal was built without a rail link so sugar was transported from Wallaville by road instead of rail, leading to the closure of the railway in June 1964. The railway track was sold to the sugar mill to build cane tramways around Wallaville.

The sugar mill closed in 1974 but the sugar cane was transported by rail to the Bingera sugar mill north of Bundaberg by connecting the Wallaville tramway network with those in the Bingera and Fairymead districts.

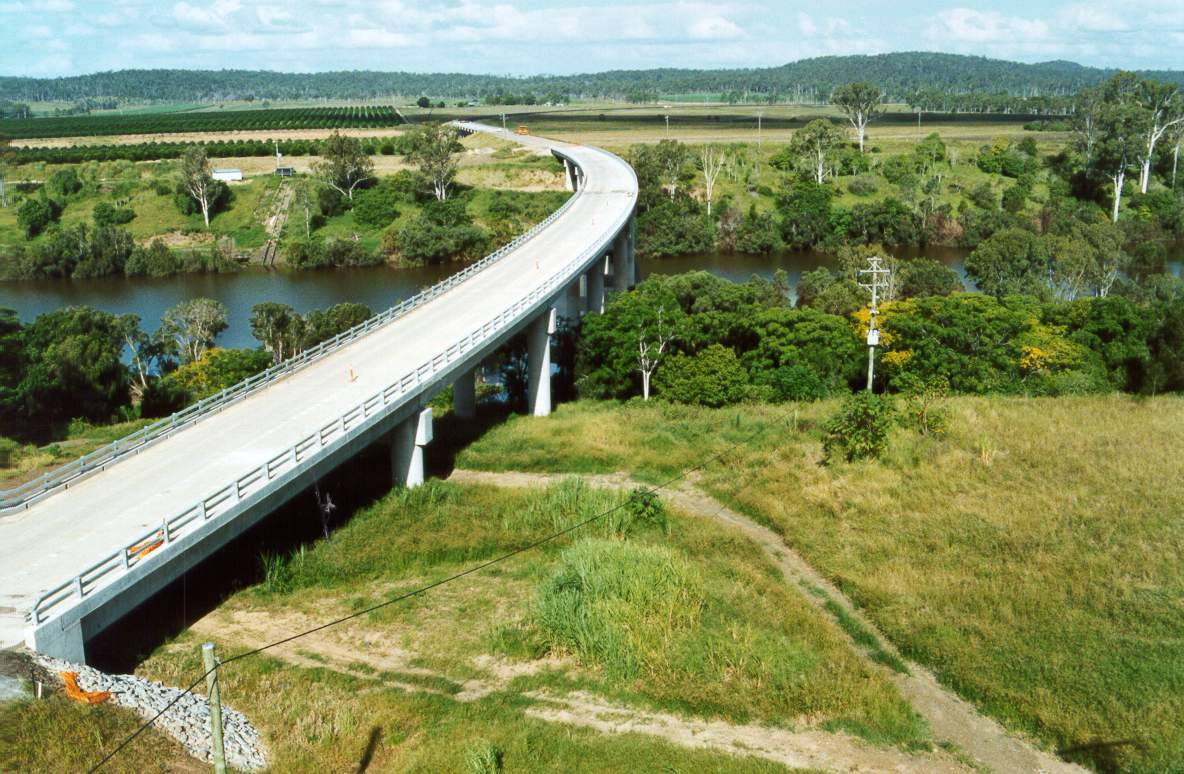
Wallaville Bridge 1999

In the mid-1990s, a weir was proposed for the Burnett River approximately 11 kilometres (6.8 mi) downstream of the Wallaville Bridge. Being a low-level bridge, the flooding of the Burnett River was already resulting in bridge closures of 2–3 days every 2–3 years and the higher river levels created by the weir would raise the river level to within a metre of the bridge deck, increasing the likelihood of closures due to flooding as well as accelerating the deterioration of the bridge itself due to the higher humidity levels under the bridge. If the proposed stage 2 of the weir proceeded (increasing the height of the weir by a further 2 metres), the bridge would be permanently underwater. Additionally the existing bridge was old and the geometry of its alignments were not of an acceptable standard for a major highway (there was a sharp bend on the southern side approach). The outcome was to recommend that a new high-level bridge be constructed 5 kilometres (3.1 mi) upstream of the existing bridge. Construction commenced in December 1997. On 5 July 1999, the Tim Fischer Bridge was opened by the Deputy Prime Minister Tim Fischer. The bridge (25.1252°S 151.9842°E) and the associated new 8.3 kilometres (5.2 mi) section of highway to access it cost $28 million.

Wallaville State School celebrated its 100th anniversary in November 2009.

== Demographics ==
In the 2006 census, the locality of Wallaville had a population of 182 people.

In the 2011 census, the locality of Wallaville had a population of 392 people.

In the 2016 census, the locality of Wallaville had a population of 410 people.

In the 2021 census, the locality of Wallaville had a population of 363 people.

== Education ==
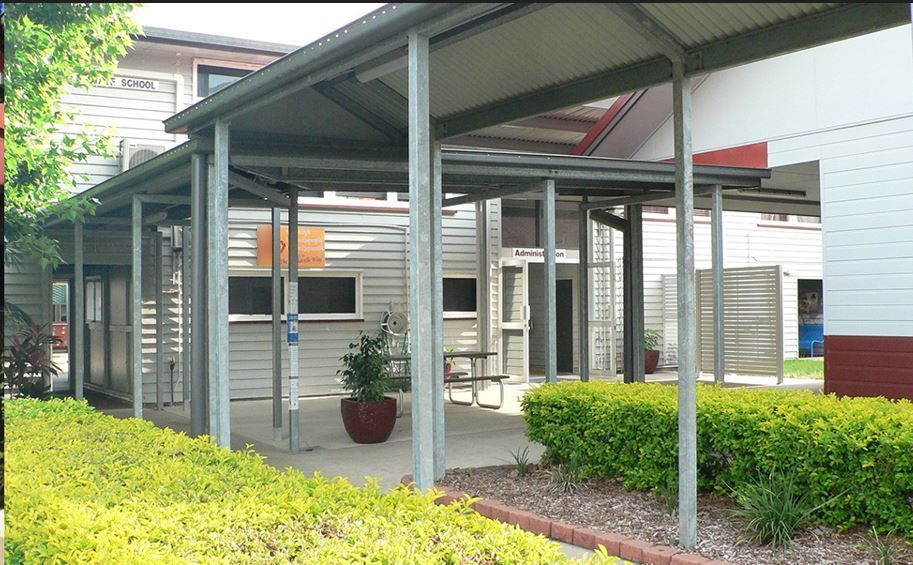
Wallaville State School, 2025

Wallaville State School is a government primary (Prep–6) school for boys and girls at 7 Grey Street (25.0733°S 151.9971°E). In 2017, the school had an enrolment of 62 students with 4 teachers (3 full-time equivalent) and 7 non-teaching staff (4 full-time equivalent).

There are no secondary schools in Wallaville. The nearest government secondary school is Gin Gin State High School in Gin Gin to the north.

== Facilities ==
The Wallaville Hall is at 2 Walla Street (25.07595°S 151.99306°E).

== See also ==
- List of tramways in Queensland
