= Bundaberg North, Queensland =

Bundaberg North
- Suburb
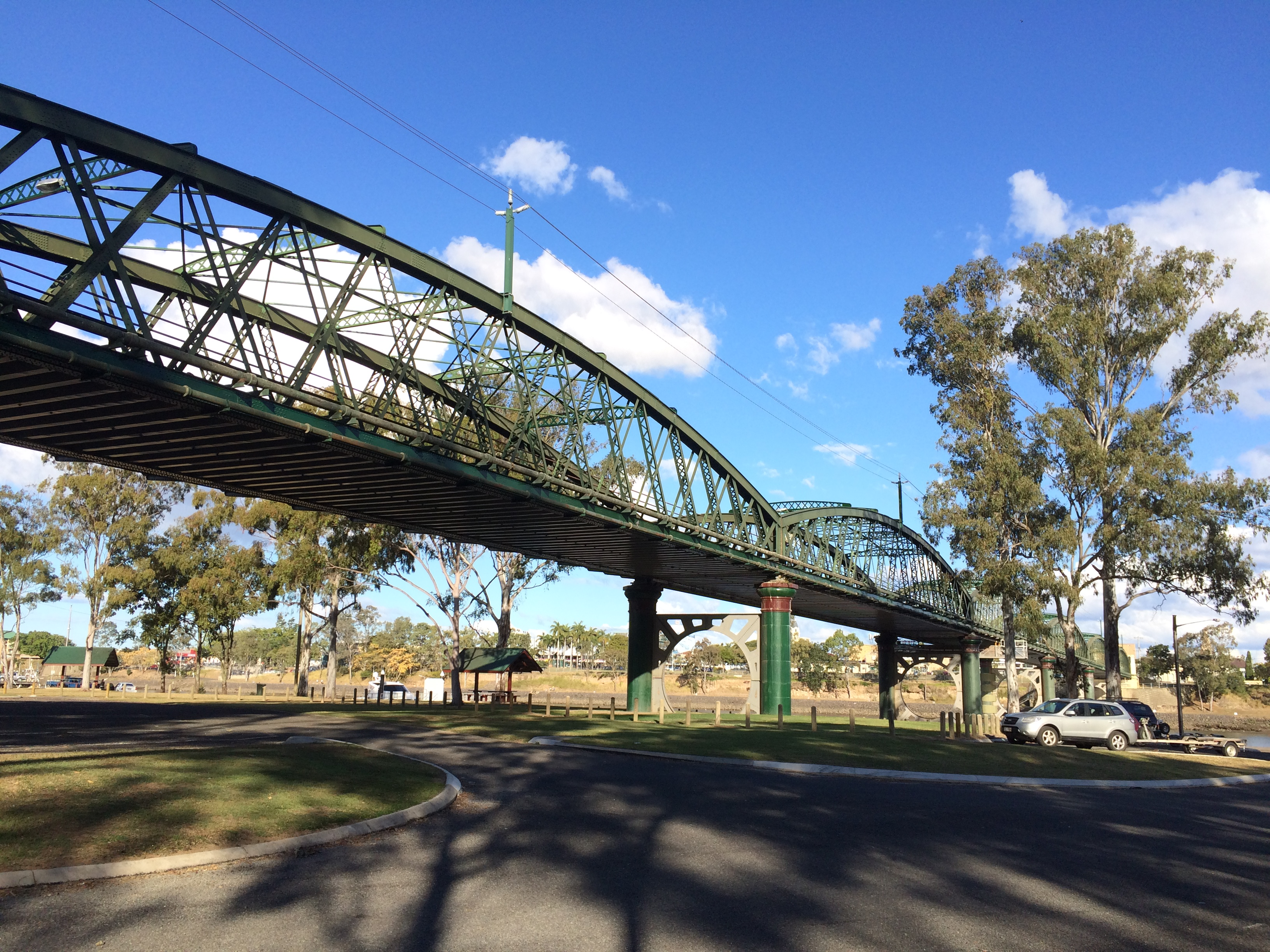
- Lions Park North under Burnett Bridge

- Interactive map of Bundaberg North
- Coordinates: 24.8497°S 152.3455°E
- Country: Australia
- State: Queensland
- City: Bundaberg
- LGA: Bundaberg Region
- Location: 1.1 km (0.68 mi) N of Bundaberg CBD; 286 km (178 mi) SE of Rockhampton; 361 km (224 mi) N of Brisbane

Government
  - State electorate: Bundaberg
  - Federal division: Hinkler

Area
  - Total: 15.4 km^{2} (5.9 sq mi)

Population
  - Total: 5,563 (2021 census)
  - Density: 361.2/km^{2} (935.6/sq mi)
- Time zone: UTC+10:00 (AEST)
- Postcode: 4670
Suburbs around Bundaberg North
Gooburrum	Gooburrum	Gooburrum
Oakwood	Bundaberg North	Kalkie
Millbank	Bundaberg West; Bundaberg Central	Bundaberg East

Bundaberg North is a suburb of Bundaberg in the Bundaberg Region, Queensland, Australia. It occupies the developed area north of the Burnett River, opposite the Bundaberg CBD. In the 2021 census, Bundaberg North had a population of 5,563 people.

== Geography ==
Bundaberg North adjoins the Bundaberg CBD and the suburbs of Bundaberg West, Bundaberg East and Kalkie at the Burnett River to the south and southeast, Gooburrum to the north and Oakwood to the west.

Bundaberg North is a residential suburb with some light industry and sugarcane farmlands.

The Hinkler Aviation Museum and Botanic Gardens are located in the suburb. The Millaquin sugar mill, operated by Bundaberg Sugar is a major employer in Bundaberg North.

== History ==
Bundaberg North Provisional School opened on 26 January 1874. On 27 September 1875, it became Bundaberg North State School.

In 1880, a Methodist church was built in North Bundaberg; it was later transferred to another denomination.

St Paul's Anglican Church was consecrated on 25 September 1887 by Bishop William Webber. Its closure on 20 September 1993 was approved by Assistant Bishop John Noble.

Bundaberg North State High School opened on 29 January 1974.

Bundaberg Seventh Day Adventist Primary School opened on 24 January 1983. It was later renamed Coral Coast Christian School. In January 2020 it was renamed Hope Adventist School.

== Demographics ==
In the 2011 census, Bundaberg North had a population of 5,485.

In the 2016 census, Bundaberg North had a population of 5,451 people.

In the 2021 census, Bundaberg North had a population of 5,563 people.

== Heritage listings ==
Bundaberg North has a number of heritage-listed sites, including:

- Burnett Bridge, Perry Street
- Fairymead House, Thornhill Street

== Commerce ==
Perry Street, Queen Street and Gavin Street are the two main activity centres in Bundaberg North, comprising small scale shopping strips, a pub, with a small shopping centre (in Gavin Street).

Parkway Shopping Plaza located at the intersection of Queen Street and Mt Perry Road, is the only standard shopping centre serving northern suburbs of Bundaberg city. It hosts the IGA Supermarket and Bundaberg North post office.

North Bundaberg is also home to four hostels for backpackers and two pubs (Globe Hotel and Young Australian Hotel).

== Parks and open space ==
Bundaberg Botanic Gardens sprawl over 27 hectares of land and feature a variety of 10,000 trees and shrubs. A magnificent lake, creating a habitat attracting up to 114 species of birds, is centrepiece of the Botanic Gardens, while a wedding chapel, shaded picnic areas, themed boardwalks, Japanese gardens and children’s playground enhance the appeal of one of Bundaberg’s favourite lifestyle precincts.

The parklands along the river, comprising Edina St Park and Lions North Park, form the largest riverside parklands in Bundaberg. The park features some BBQ facilities and two boat ramps. Several smaller reserves are distributed evenly through the residential area.

There are two main sports facilities in the suburb : the Bundaberg Golf Course and the Hockey Ground.

== Education ==
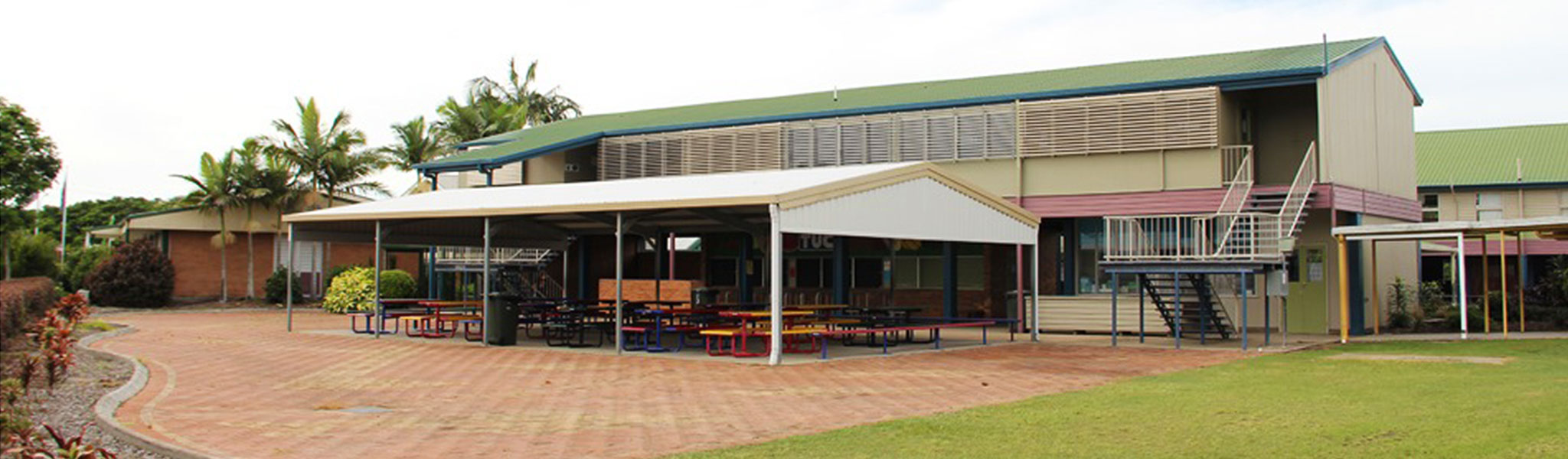
Bundaberg North State School, 2025

Bundaberg North State School is a government primary (Prep–6) school for boys and girls at 4 Mount Perry Road (24.8518°S 152.3404°E). In 2018, the school had an enrolment of 351 students with 34 teachers (29 full-time equivalent) and 27 non-teaching staff (16 full-time equivalent). It includes a special education program.

Hope Adventist School (formerly Coral Coast Christian School) is a private primary (Prep–6) school for boys and girls at 18 Walters Street (24.8530°S 152.3314°E). In 2018, the school had an enrolment of 33 students with 4 teachers (3 full-time equivalent) and 4 non-teaching staff (2 full-time equivalent).

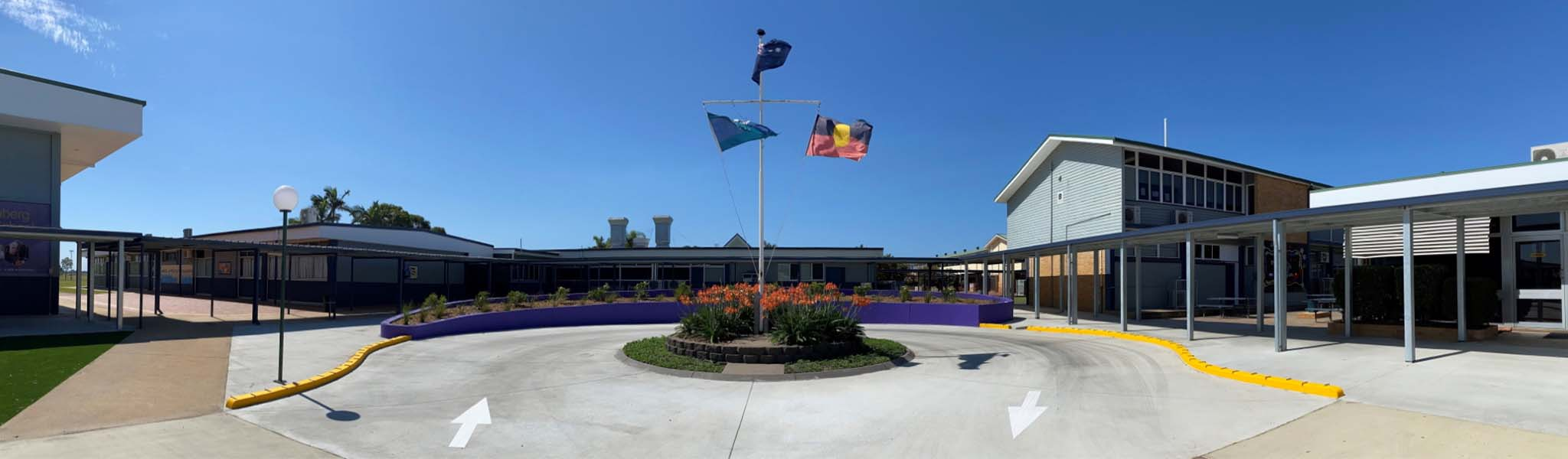
Bundaberg North State High School, 2025

Bundaberg North State High School is a government secondary (7–12) school for boys and girls at 9 Marks Street (24.8494°S 152.3396°E). In 2018, the school had an enrolment of 706 students with 77 teachers (72 full-time equivalent) and 41 non-teaching staff (29 full-time equivalent). It include a special education program.

== Transport ==
Major roads include Hinkler Avenue (State Route 3), Queen Street and Ferrymead Road.

Bundaberg North is serviced by two bus routes:

- Route 3B: City to North Bundaberg via Botanical Gardens, RSL Village and Golf Club
- Route 6: City to Moore Park Beach

== See also ==
- List of tramways in Queensland
