= Monduran, Queensland =

Monduran
- Suburb
- Interactive map of Monduran
- Coordinates: 24.8436°S 151.9094°E
- Country: Australia
- State: Queensland
- LGA: Bundaberg Region
- Location: 13.0 km (8.1 mi) NNW of Gin Gin; 62.2 km (38.6 mi) W of Bundaberg; 262 km (163 mi) SE of Rockhampton; 384 km (239 mi) NNW of Brisbane

Government
  - State electorates: Burnett; Callide
  - Federal division: Flynn

Area
  - Total: 284.6 km^{2} (109.9 sq mi)

Population
  - Total: 84 (2021 census)
  - Density: 0.2952/km^{2} (0.764/sq mi)
- Time zone: UTC+10:00 (AEST)
- Postcode: 4671
Suburbs around Monduran
| Lake Monduran | Rosedale | Waterloo |
| Takilberan | Monduran | Abbotsford |
| Moolboolaman | Gin Gin | Bucca; Damascus |

Monduran is a rural locality in the Bundaberg Region, Queensland, Australia. In the 2021 census, Monduran had a population of 84 people.

== Geography ==
Lake Monduran forms much of the western boundary of the locality. The lake is the impoundment of the Kolan River by the Fred Haigh Dam (also known as the Monduran Dam). The river flows from the dam in the west of the locality through the locality to the east, where then forms the boundary between neighbouring localities Bucca and Damascus.

The Bruce Highway passes from east to west through the south part of the locality. Monduran Dam Road connects the highway to the dam wall.

There are two large areas of the Monduran State Forest in the locality, one area beside Lake Monduran and the other near the boundary with neighbouring Abbotsford. The most northerly part of the locality is in the Littabella National Park which extends into neighbouring Rosedale and Waterloo.

== History ==
The locality name is derived from a pastoral run held by John and James Landsborough (brothers of William Landsborough) in 1857.

In 1887, 63,300 acres (25,600 ha) of land were resumed from the Monduran pastoral run. The land was offered for selection for the establishment of small farms on 17 April 1887.

On 30 March 1866, bushranger James Alpin McPherson known as the "Wild Scotchman" was captured on Monduran Station by station manager William Nott.

Monduran Provisional School opened on 28 January 1910 on a 5-acre (2.0 ha) site under teacher Miss E. G. Duncan. It became Monduran State School on 1 February 1918. By 1921, the school was closed due to low numbers of students, but was re-opened for three months. It closed permanently on 5 May 1922. It was west of Monduran Road (approx 24.82530°S 151.90697°E).

== Demographics ==
In the 2016 census, Monduran had a population of 91 people.

In the 2021 census, Monduran had a population of 84 people.

== Education ==
There are no schools in Monduran. The nearest government primary schools are Gin Gin State School in neighbouring Gin Gin to the south, Bullyard State School in Bullyard to the south-east, and Yandaran State School in Yandaran to the north-east. The nearest government secondary school is Gin Gin State High School, also in Gin Gin.

== Attractions ==
The lake is popular for fishing and water sports; there are no boating restrictions on the lake. There are picnic facilities near the dam and a range of accommodation is available at the Lake Monduran Holiday Park.

The Monduran Anglers and Stocking Association Inc stock the lake with barramundi and Australian bass.
