= Takilberan, Queensland =

Takilberan
- Suburb
- Interactive map of Takilberan
- Coordinates: 24.8794°S 151.7261°E
- Country: Australia
- State: Queensland
- LGA: Bundaberg Region
- Location: 22.6 km (14.0 mi) NW of Gin Gin; 71.8 km (44.6 mi) W of Bundaberg; 385 km (239 mi) NNW of Brisbane

Government
  - State electorate: Callide
  - Federal division: Flynn

Area
  - Total: 238.2 km^{2} (92.0 sq mi)

Population
  - Total: 47 (2021 census)
  - Density: 0.1973/km^{2} (0.511/sq mi)
- Time zone: UTC+10:00 (AEST)
- Postcode: 4671
Suburbs around Takilberan
Gaeta	Kolonga	Lake Monduran
Gaeta	Takilberan	Monduran
Wonbah Forest	New Moonta	Moolboolaman

Takilberan is a rural locality in the Bundaberg Region, Queensland, Australia. In the 2021 census, Takilberan had a population of 47 people.

== Geography ==
The locality is bounded to the north-east by the shores of Lake Monduran, an impoundment of the Kolan River by the Fred Haigh Dam. The lake itself is within the locality of Lake Monduran.

Takilberan has the following mountains:

- Mount Landsborough in the north of the locality (24.8592°S 151.7351°E), rising 218 metres (715 ft) above sea level
- Black Mountain in the west of the locality (24.9093°S 151.6399°E), 489 metres (1,604 ft)
- Mount Takilberan in the south-west of the locality on the boundary with neighbouring Wonbah Forest (24.9290°S 151.6346°E), 560 metres (1,840 ft)

The Bruce Highway enters the locality from the east (Monduran) and exits to the north (Kolonga).

Takilberan Creek rises in the neighbouring locality of Gaeta, just west of the north-west corner of Takilberan. It meanders south through Gaeta and Wonbah Forest before entering the locality of Takilberan from the south-west and then flows north, exiting the locality to the north near the Bruce Highway. It ultimately flows into Lake Monduran.

The land use is almost entirely grazing on native vegetation.

== History ==
The locality presumably takes its name from the Mount Takilberan, which is derived from the Koreng Goreng language, meaning a hanging rock or stone.

Takilberan Rock Provisional School opened on 17 September 1917 and closed on 20 September 1922.

== Demographics ==
In the 2016 census, Takilberan had a population of 21 people.

In the 2021 census, Takilberan had a population of 47 people.

== Education ==
There are no schools in Takilberan. The nearest government primary schools are Gin Gin State School in Gin Gin to the south-east and Mount Perry State School in Mount Perry to the south. The nearest government secondary school is Gin Gin State High School, also in Gin Gin.

== Amenities ==
Although the boat ramp into Lake Monduran is on the foreshores of the lake and hence in the locality of Lake Monduran (24.87397°S 151.84512°E), the only access to the boat ramp is from Monduran Dam Boat Ramp Road via Monduran Dam Road in Takilberan. The boat ramp is managed by the Bundaberg Regional Council.
