= Lake Monduran, Queensland =

Suburb of Bundaberg Region, Australia

Lake Monduran
- Suburb
- Interactive map of Lake Monduran
- Coordinates: 24.8108°S 151.8038°E
- Country: Australia
- State: Queensland
- LGA: Bundaberg Region
- Location: 23.7 km (14.7 mi) NNW of Gin Gin; 72.6 km (45.1 mi) W of Bundaberg; 373 km (232 mi) NNW of Brisbane

Government
  - State electorates: Callide; Burnett
  - Federal division: Flynn

Area
  - Total: 85.4 km^{2} (33.0 sq mi)

Population
  - Total: 0 (2021 census)
  - Density: 0.000/km^{2} (0.000/sq mi)
- Time zone: UTC+10:00 (AEST)
- Postcode: 4671
Suburbs around Lake Monduran
Lowmead	Rosedale	Monduran
Kolonga	Lake Monduran	Monduran
Takilberan	Takilberan	Monduran

Lake Monduran is a rural locality in the Bundaberg Region, Queensland, Australia. In the 2021 census, Lake Monduran had "no people or a very low population".

== Geography ==
The locality contains the lake of the same name, created by the Fred Haigh Dam (24.8706°S 151.8503°E), and the immediately surrounding foreshores of the lake and the dam and associated infrastructure.

== History ==
The locality takes its name from the lake, which in turn takes its name from the pastoral run held by John and James Landsborough (brothers of William Landsborough) in 1857.

The Fred Haigh Dam was constructed across the Kolan River in 1978 creating Lake Monduran (24.8166°S 151.8166°E). The lake was officially named on 1 January 1980 and gazetted on 5 January 1980.

== Demographics ==
In the 2016 census, Lake Monduran had a population of 3 people.

In the 2021 census, Lake Monduran had "no people or a very low population".

== Education ==
There are no schools in the locality. The nearest government primary school is Gin Gin State School in Gin Gin to the south and the nearest government secondary school is Gin Gin State High School, also in Gin Gin.

== Attractions ==
The lake is popular for fishing as it is stocked with Australian bass, barramundi, golden perch, saratoga, silver perch and sooty grunter, but a Stocked Impoundment Permit must be obtained.

The lake is popular for boating with a boat ramp at Fred Haig Dam (24.8741°S 151.8451°E), which is managed by the Bundaberg Regional Council.

There is a lookout at the park at the dam wall on Monduran Dam Road (24.8744°S 151.8524°E). Adjacent is the privately operated Lake Monduran Holiday Park with cabins and facilities for caravans and camping and houseboat rentals. There is a public camping reserve on the Bruce Highway (corner with Hintons Road, 24.7252°S 151.7034°E) beside the Kolan River.
