= Kolonga, Queensland =

Kolonga
- Suburb
- Interactive map of Kolonga
- Coordinates: 24.7866°S 151.6872°E
- Country: Australia
- State: Queensland
- LGA: Bundaberg Region
- Location: 45.6 km (28.3 mi) NW of Gin Gin; 74.2 km (46.1 mi) SW of Rosedale; 94.8 km (58.9 mi) WNW of Bundaberg; 124 km (77 mi) S of Gladstone; 416 km (258 mi) NNW of Brisbane

Government
  - State electorate: Callide
  - Federal division: Flynn

Area
  - Total: 144.9 km^{2} (55.9 sq mi)

Population
  - Total: 33 (2021 census)
  - Density: 0.228/km^{2} (0.590/sq mi)
- Time zone: UTC+10:00 (AEST)
- Postcode: 4671
Suburbs around Kolonga
Molangul	Lowmead	Lake Monduran
Gaeta	Kolonga	Lake Monduran
Takilberan	Takilberan	Lake Monduran

Kolonga is a rural locality in the Bundaberg Region, Queensland, Australia. In the 2021 census, Kolonga had a population of 33 people.

== Geography ==
The east of Kolonga is bounded by Lake Monduran, the impoundment of the Fred Haigh Dam.

The Bruce Highway passes through the locality from Takilberan in the south to Lowmead to the north. Shortly after the highway enters from the south, Kalpowar Road branches off to Gaeta in the west.

The land use is grazing on native vegetation.

== History ==
The locality name takes its name from the parish name which in turn is named after the Kolonga pastoral run named in the early 1860s. Kolonga is probably from the Kabi language word, kalanga meaning very good.

Kolonga Provisional School opened circa 1886 and closed circa 1887. Kolonga Provisional School opened 1911 and closed in 1924. It is not clear if these were the same school or two separate schools.

In 1887, 54,080 acres (21,890 ha) of land were resumed from the Kolonga pastoral run. The land was offered for selection for the establishment of small farms on 17 April 1887.

== Demographics ==
In the 2016 census, Kolonga had a population of 49 people.

In the 2021 census, Kolonga had a population of 33 people.

== Education ==
There are no schools in Kolonga. The nearest government primary schools are Lowmead State School in neighbouring Lowmead to the north and Gin Gin State School in Gin Gin to the south-east. The nearest government secondary schools are Gin Gin State High School in Gin Gin and Rosedale State School in Rosedale to the north-east.
