= Abbotsford, Queensland =

Abbotsford
- Suburb
- Interactive map of Abbotsford
- Coordinates: 24.8322°S 152.0047°E
- Country: Australia
- State: Queensland
- LGA: Bundaberg Region
- Location: 30.8 km (19.1 mi) NE of Gin Gin; 37.4 km (23.2 mi) W of Bundaberg; 369 km (229 mi) N of Brisbane

Government
  - State electorate: Burnett
  - Federal division: Flynn

Area
  - Total: 84.4 km^{2} (32.6 sq mi)

Population
  - Total: 20 (2021 census)
  - Density: 0.24/km^{2} (0.61/sq mi)
- Time zone: UTC+10:00 (AEST)
- Postcode: 4670
Suburbs around Abbotsford
Waterloo	Waterloo	Yandaran
Monduran	Abbotsford	Bucca
Monduran	Bucca	Bucca

Abbotsford is a rural locality in the Bundaberg Region, Queensland, Australia. In the 2021 census, Abbotsford had a population of 20 people.

== Geography ==
The neighbourhood of Kinagin is in the south-east of the locality (24.8486°S 152.0343°E).

The Bluff is a mountain on the south-western boundary of the locality (24.8691°S 151.9959°E). It rises to 153 metres (502 ft) above sea level.

Part of the west and south-west of the locality is within the Monduran State Forest 1, which extends into neighbouring Monduran. Apart from this protected area, the land use is grazing on native vegetation.

== Demographics ==
In the 2016 census, Abbotsford had a population of 3 people.

In the 2021 census, Abbotsford had a population of 20 people.

== Education ==
There are no schools in Abbotsford. The nearest government primary schools are Yandaran State School in neighbouring Yandaran to the north-east and Bullyard State School in Bullyard to the south. The nearest government secondary schools are Gin Gin State High School in Gin Gin to the south-west and Bundaberg North State High School in Bundaberg North to the east.
