= Gaeta, Queensland =

Gaeta
- Suburb
- Interactive map of Gaeta
- Coordinates: 24.835°S 151.5927°E
- Country: Australia
- State: Queensland
- LGA: Bundaberg Region
- Location: 37.7 km (23.4 mi) N of Mount Perry; 58.9 km (36.6 mi) NW of Gin Gin; 108 km (67 mi) W of Bundaberg; 413 km (257 mi) NNW of Brisbane

Government
  - State electorate: Callide
  - Federal division: Flynn

Area
  - Total: 123.9 km^{2} (47.8 sq mi)

Population
  - Total: 134 (2021 census)
  - Density: 1.082/km^{2} (2.801/sq mi)
- Time zone: UTC+10:00 (AEST)
- Postcode: 4671
Suburbs around Gaeta
Molangul	Molangul	Kolonga
Yarrol	Gaeta	Kolonga
Yarrol	Wonbah Forest	Takilberan

Gaeta is a rural locality in the Bundaberg Region, Queensland, Australia. In the 2021 census, Gaeta had a population of 134 people.

== Geography ==
The locality is bounded to the north by the Kolan River.

The locality has the following mountains:

- Mount Gaeta in the central east of the locality, near the boundary with Takilberan (24.8479°S 151.5989°E) rising to 542 metres (1,778 ft) above sea level
- Mount Bania in the south of the locality (24.8861°S 151.5762°E) rising to 555 metres (1,821 ft) above sea level

The headwaters of Gaeta Creek are on the east side of Mount Gaeta. This creek flows east to join Walily Creek.

Kalpowar Road traverses the locality east-west and Gaeta Road traverses the locality north-south.

== History ==
In 1881, the name of the Wallilah Post Office was changed to Gaeta Post Office. In October 1882, this post office was abolished, but following a petition from the residents (mostly miners) the post office was re-established in December 1882.

Near the end of the 1890s there was a cyanide works in the area.

Gaeta Provisional School opened on 9 July 1906 and then closed in 1907. On 22 January 1912, it re-opened as Gaeta State School and closed in 1930. On 13 May 1957, it re-opened as Gaeta Provisional School. It closed permanently on 2 May 1975. It was at 270 Gaeta Road (24.80932°S 151.59517°E). The school building is still extant and is used as a community meeting place.

Gold and other mineral mining projects continued sporadically in the area until at least 1997.

== Demographics ==
In the 2016 census, Gaeta had a population of 125 people.

In the 2021 census, Gaeta had a population of 134 people.

== Education ==
There are no schools in Gaeta. The nearest government primary schools are Mount Perry State School in Mount Perry to the south, Gin Gin State School in Gin Gin to the south-east, and Builyan State School in Boyne Valley to the north. The nearest government secondary school is Gin Gin State High School, also in Gin Gin, but the western part of Gaeta may be too far for a daily commute, so the alternatives are distance education and boarding school.
