= Bucca, Queensland =

Bucca
- Suburb
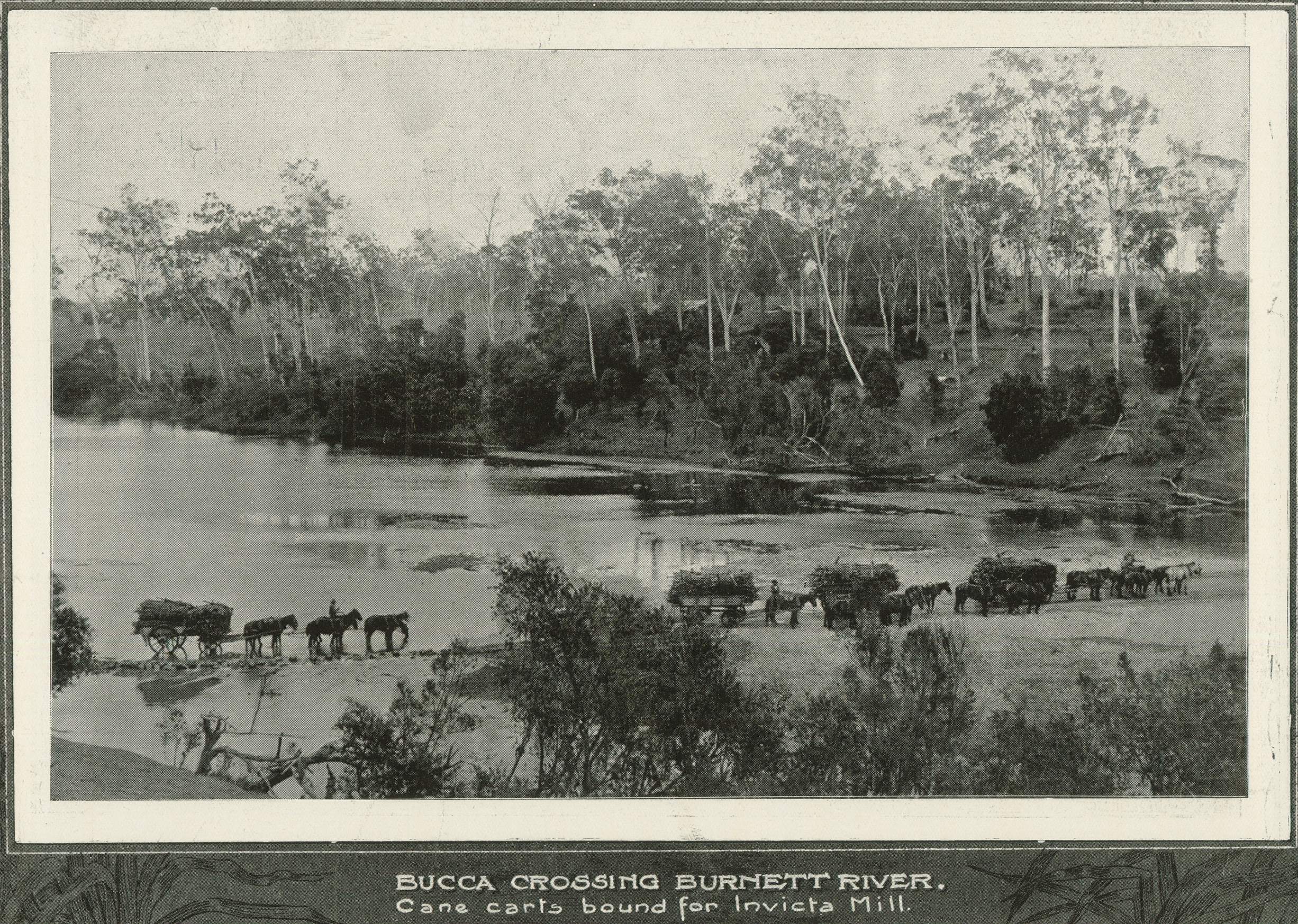
- Bucca Crossing of the Kolan River, Cane carts bound for Invicta Mill, 1919

- Interactive map of Bucca
- Coordinates: 24.8625°S 152.1008°E
- Country: Australia
- State: Queensland
- LGA: Bundaberg Region
- Location: 31.1 km (19.3 mi) W of Bundaberg CBD; 366 km (227 mi) N of Brisbane

Government
  - State electorates: Burnett; Callide
  - Federal division: Flynn

Area
  - Total: 188.1 km^{2} (72.6 sq mi)

Population
  - Total: 1,063 (2021 census)
  - Density: 5.651/km^{2} (14.637/sq mi)
- Time zone: UTC+10:00 (AEST)
- Postcode: 4670
Suburbs around Bucca
Abbotsford	Yandaran; Avondale	Moorland
Monduran; Damascus	Bucca	Meadowvale
Bullyard	Bungadoo	South Kolan

Bucca is a rural locality in the Bundaberg Region, Queensland, Australia. In the 2021 census, Bucca had a population of 1,063 people.

The neighbourhood of Kolan is within the locality (24.8667°S 152.1000°E).

== Geography ==
The Kolan River flows through the locality entering along its south-west boundary with Monduran, Damascus and Bullyard and exiting the locality on its north-east boundary with Avondale and Moorland. Bucca Crossing was a ford across the river at 24.8608°S 152.0946°E.

The district once known as North Kolan (or Kolan North) spans Bucca and neighbouring Moorland to the north.

The land is used for cropping, particularly sugarcane on the river flats, and grazing on native vegetation.

== History ==
Kolan takes its name from the pastoral run which in turn takes its name from the Kabi language, kalang meaning good.

In 1887, 69,300 acres (28,000 ha) of land were resumed from the Kolan pastoral run. The land was offered for selection for the establishment of small farms on 17 April 1887.

Bucca Crossing Provisional School opened on 26 August 1889. On 1 January 1909 it became Bucca State School. It closed on 17 October 1964. It was located at 172 South Bucca Road (24.8802°S 152.0839°E).

Bucca Community Hall opened on 10 February 1906.

The Invicta Sugar Mill was originally located in Bucca near the Kolan River. In 1919, it was relocated to Giru in the Shire of Burdekin where it continues to operate under the same name.

On 29 November 1992, a violent tornado damaged and destroyed multiple homes, with some being flattened to the ground. While this tornado is officially rated F4 on the Fujita scale, Jeff Callaghan, a retired senior severe weather forecaster at the Bureau of Meteorology said "the Bucca tornado was rated a F4 or possibly an F5." Although the most violent Australian tornado with an official rating, the tornado did not kill or seriously injure anyone.

== Demographics ==
In the 2016 census, Bucca had a population of 1,027 people.

In the 2021 census, Bucca had a population of 1,063 people.

== Education ==
There are no schools in Bucca. The nearest government primary schools are Bullyard State School in neighbouring Bullyard to the south-west, Kolan South State School in neighbouring South Kolan to the south-east, Gooburrum State School in Gooburrum to the east, Avondale State School in neighbouring in Avondale to the north and Yandaran State School in neighbouring Yandaran to the north. The nearest government secondary schools are Gin Gin State High School in Gin Gin to the south-west and Bundaberg North State High School in Bundaberg North to the east.

== Amenities ==
The Bucca Community Hall is at 28 Longs Road. It is listed on the Bundaberg Region's heritage register.
