= Delan =

- Suburb
- Interactive map of Delan
- Coordinates: 25.0166°S 152.0497°E
- Country: Australia
- State: Queensland
- LGA: Bundaberg Region
- Location: 16.1 km (10.0 mi) E of Gin Gin; 42.8 km (26.6 mi) WSW of Bundaberg CBD; 376 km (234 mi) N of Brisbane

Government
  - State electorate: Callide
  - Federal division: Flynn

Area
  - Total: 32.3 km^{2} (12.5 sq mi)

Population
  - Total: 323 (2021 census)
  - Density: 10.000/km^{2} (25.90/sq mi)
- Time zone: UTC+10:00 (AEST)
- Postcode: 4671
Suburbs around Delan
Maroondan	Bullyard	Bungadoo
McIlwraith	Delan	Bungadoo
Drinan	Duingal	Bungadoo

Delan is a mixed-use locality in the Bundaberg Region, Queensland, Australia. In the 2021 census, Delan had a population of 323 people.

== Geography ==
The land use is a mixture of rural residential housing and agriculture, which is a mixture of grazing on native vegetation and crop growing.

== History ==
The locality takes its name from the railway station name assigned by the Queensland Railways Department on 6 January 1921 and is an Aboriginal word meaning possum.

Woodbine State School opened on 16 October 1922. It was renamed Berrembea State School in 1924. It closed in 1967. It was at 559 Berrembea Road (25.02739°S 152.04050°E).

== Demographics ==
In the 2016 census, Delan had a population of 299 people.

In the 2021 census, Delan had a population of 323 people.

== Education ==
There are no schools in Delan. The nearest government primary schools are:

- Bullyard State School in neighbouring Bullyard to the north
- Maroondan State School in neighbouring Maroondan to the north-west
- McIlwraith State School in neighbouring McIlwraith to the west
- Wallaville State School in Wallaville to the south-west

The nearest government secondary school is Gin Gin State High School in Gin Gin to the west.
