= Avondale railway station =

Avondale railway station may refer to:

- Avondale railway station, Auckland, on the Western Line of the Auckland railway network in New Zealand
- Avondale railway station, Queensland, a closed railway station on the North Coast railway
- Avondale station (MARTA), a train station in Decatur, Georgia, United States
- Avondale station (Illinois), a former commuter rail station in Chicago, Illinois, United States
- Avondale Railway Station Registered Heritage Structure (Canada), a designated heritage property in Newfoundland and Labrador, Canada.
