= Waterloo, Queensland =

Waterloo
- Suburb
- Interactive map of Waterloo
- Coordinates: 24.7463°S 151.99°E
- Country: Australia
- State: Queensland
- LGA: Bundaberg Region
- Location: 34.7 km (21.6 mi) N of Gin Gin; 37.2 km (23.1 mi) SE of Rosedale; 43 km (27 mi) NW of Bundaberg; 394 km (245 mi) NNW of Brisbane

Government
  - State electorate: Burnett
  - Federal division: Flynn

Area
  - Total: 124.1 km^{2} (47.9 sq mi)

Population
  - Total: 171 (2021 census)
  - Density: 1.378/km^{2} (3.569/sq mi)
- Time zone: UTC+10:00 (AEST)
- Postcode: 4673
Suburbs around Waterloo
Rosedale	Watalgan	Mullett Creek
Monduran	Waterloo	Yandaran
Monduran	Abbotsford	Abbotsford

Waterloo is a rural locality in the Bundaberg Region, Queensland, Australia. In the 2021 census, Waterloo had a population of 171 people.

== Geography ==
The northwest of the locality is in the Littabella National Park which extends into neighbouring Rosedale and Monduran. A small part of southwest of the locality is in the Monduran State Forest which extends into Monduran.

== History ==
The locality of Waterloo was named for Waterloo Plantation, selected by Christian Thygesen, a Danish sugar boiler who had previously worked for Sharon, Pemberton, and Windsor sugar mills in the Bundaberg district. By early 1895, Thygesen had selected a large area of land in the Littabella area, naming it "Waterloo". He entered into partnership with farmer Adam Pringle with the intention of establishing a sugar mill on the site.

Thygesen planted sugarcane and travelled approximately 600 kilometres south to the Richmond River district in northern New South Wales to inspect suitable machinery for the mill. He purchased a small mill there, had it dismantled, and transported it to Waterloo for reassembly.

The first raw sugar produced from Waterloo was sold to Millaquin Mill in June 1895. The Waterloo mill operated for approximately eleven years under Christian Thygesen before it was sold.

Waterloo State School opened circa 1937 and closed in 1955. It was on Waterloo Hall Road (24.7467°S 152.0063°E).

== Community facilities ==
A central landmark of the locality is the Waterloo Hall, a public hall constructed in 1911. The construction was driven by the local Waterloo public hall committee with the support of Waterloo Ltd. The company offered a lease of land for a renewable term of 25 years, contributing £20 and clearing the land at their own expense.

The Waterloo Hall was officially opened on 10 June 1911, an event commemorated with a community ball.

Over the decades, the hall has served as an important venue for the district, hosting evenings ranging from social gatherings and celebrations, to farewells for servicemen heading to war. It continues to function as a hub for Waterloo community life, hosting community barbecues, weddings, markets, cultural celebrations, and other local events.

== Demographics ==
In the 2016 census, Waterloo had a population of 145 people.

In the 2021 census, Waterloo had a population of 171 people.

== Education ==
There are no schools in Waterloo. The nearest government primary schools are Yandaran State School in neighbouring Yandaran to the east and Winfield State School in Winfield to the north. The nearest government secondary schools are Rosedale State School in neighbouring Rosedale to the north-west, Bundaberg North State High School in Bundaberg North to the south-east, and Gin Gin State High School in Gin Gin to the south.
