= Yandaran railway station =

Former railway station in Queensland, Australia

Yandaran

General information
- Location: Rollings Street, Yandaran, Queensland (access from Miara Road)
- Coordinates: 24°43′11″S 152°06′40″E
- Line: North Coast Line
- Connections: no connections

History
- Closed: Yes

Services
Preceding station	Queensland Rail	Following station
Avondale towards Brisbane	North Coast line	Littabella towards Cairns
Location

Yandaran railway station is a closed railway station on the North Coast railway line, Queensland, Australia.
