= Damascus, Queensland =

Damascus
- Suburb
- Interactive map of Damascus
- Coordinates: 24.9252°S 151.9788°E
- Country: Australia
- State: Queensland
- LGA: Bundaberg Region
- Location: 6.8 km (4.2 mi) N of Gin Gin; 55.8 km (34.7 mi) W of Bundaberg; 168 km (104 mi) SSE of Gladstone; 353 km (219 mi) N of Brisbane

Government
  - State electorate: Callide
  - Federal division: Flynn

Area
  - Total: 58.6 km^{2} (22.6 sq mi)

Population
  - Total: 96 (2021 census)
  - Density: 1.638/km^{2} (4.243/sq mi)
- Postcode: 4671
Suburbs around Damascus
Monduran	Monduran	Bucca
Monduran	Damascus	Bullyard
Gin Gin	Maroondan	Maroondan

Damascus is a rural locality in the Bundaberg Region, Queensland, Australia. In the 2021 census, Damascus had a population of 96 people.

== Geography ==
The Kolan River forms the north-east boundary of the locality, while Gin Gin Creek forms the south-eastern boundary of the locality. Their confluence is the easternmost point of the locality.

The Bruce Highway forms the western boundary.

The land use is predominantly grazing on native vegetation with some rural residential housing in the south-west of the locality.

== Demographics ==
In the 2016 census, Damascus had a population of 97 people.

In the 2021 census, Damascus had a population of 96 people.

== Education ==
There are no schools in Damascus. The nearest government primary schools are Gin Gin State School in neighbouring Gin Gin to the south-east and Maroondan State School in Maroondan to the south-east. The nearest government secondary school is Gin Gin State High School, also in Gin Gin.
