= Littabella railway station =

Former railway station in Queensland, Australia

Littabella

General information
- Location: Littabella Siding Lane, Yandaran, Queensland (access from Dicksons Road)
- Coordinates: 24°41′06″S 152°04′41″E
- Line: North Coast Line
- Connections: no connections

History
- Closed: Yes

Services
Preceding station	Queensland Rail	Following station
Yandaran towards Brisbane	North Coast line	Takoko towards Cairns
Location

Littabella railway station is a closed railway station on the North Coast railway line, Queensland.
