= Takoko railway station =

Former railway station in Queensland, Australia

Takoko

General information
- Location: Dicksons Road, Yandaran, Queensland
- Coordinates: 24.6758°S 152.0725°E
- Line: North Coast Line
- Connections: no connections

History
- Closed: Yes

Services
| Preceding station | Queensland Rail | Following station |
|---|---|---|
| Littabella towards Brisbane | North Coast line | Mullett Creek towards Cairns |
Location

Takoko railway station is a former railway station on the North Coast railway line, Queensland, Australia. It was in the Bundaberg Region.
