= James Alpin McPherson =

Scottish–born Australian bushranger

James Alpin Macpherson
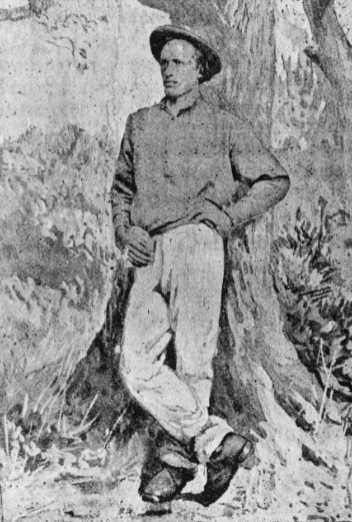
- James Alpin Macpherson in 1866
- Born: 1842
- Died: 23 August 1895 (aged 52–53); Burketown, Queensland, Australia
- Occupation: Bushranger
- Convictions: Assault, theft, armed robbery
- Penalty: St Helena Island

James Alpin Macpherson (1842–23 August 1895) sometimes spelled "MacPherson" or "McPherson," and otherwise known as The Wild Scotchman, was a Scottish–born Australian bushranger active in Queensland and New South Wales in the 1860s. He was operational throughout the greater Wide Bay area and was eventually apprehended by members of the public outside the town of Gin Gin, Queensland.

== Early life ==
The eldest of eight children, Macpherson was born in Inverness-shire, Scotland, in 1842, to John, a farmer, and Elspeth, his wife. When Macpherson was twelve, his family migrated to Australia aboard the William Miles. After arriving at Moreton Bay on 19 January 1855, John Macpherson found work as a farm labourer, while James began school at Ipswich, where he displayed a skill for languages, becoming fluent in French and German.

After finishing his schooling, Macpherson first started work at a stoneyard on the corner of Wharf and Queen streets in Ipswich, owned by a Mr. Petrie, before finding work on a cattle station. On the station he began 'tailing' cattle (keeping them near the head station at mustering time) and bought a revolver to practice shooting with in his spare time.

== Bushranging ==
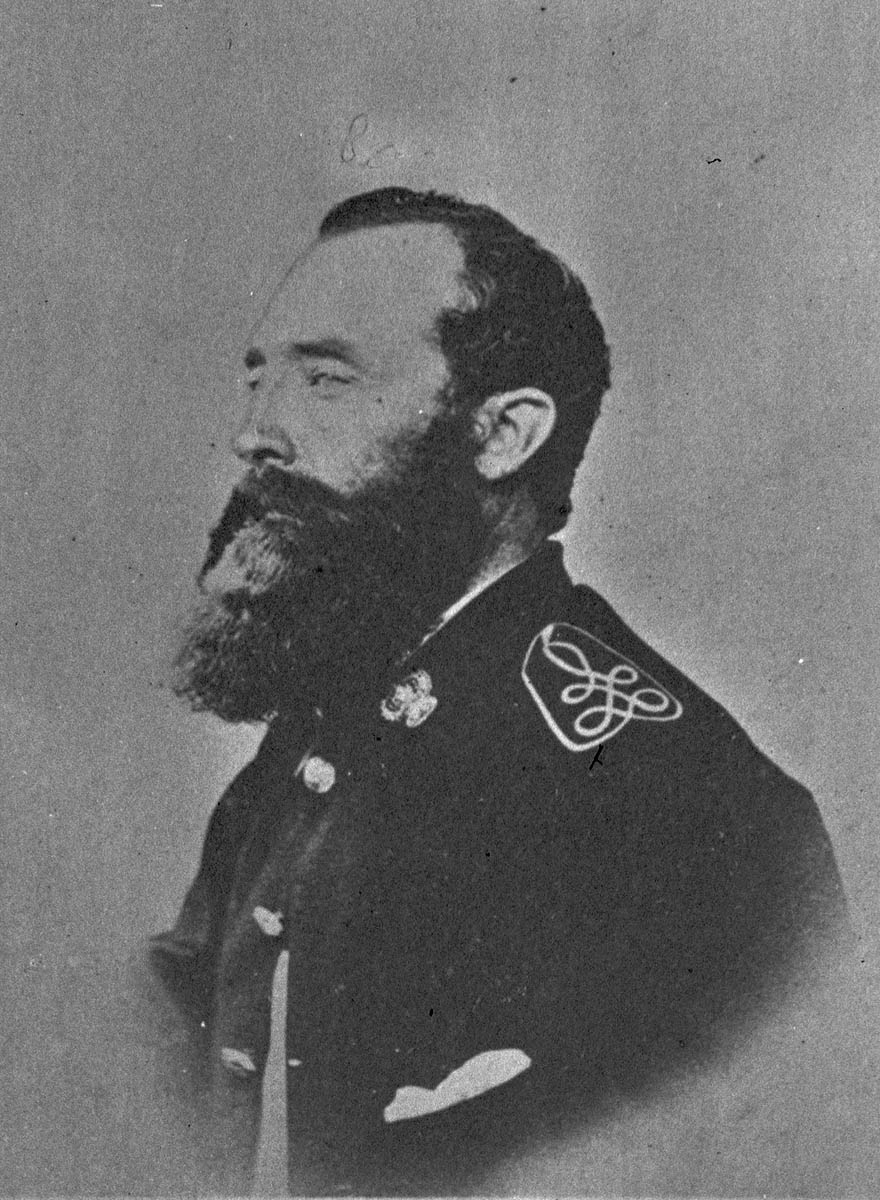
N.S.W. Police officer Sir Frederick Pottinger who wounded Macpherson in 1864 but failed to capture him.

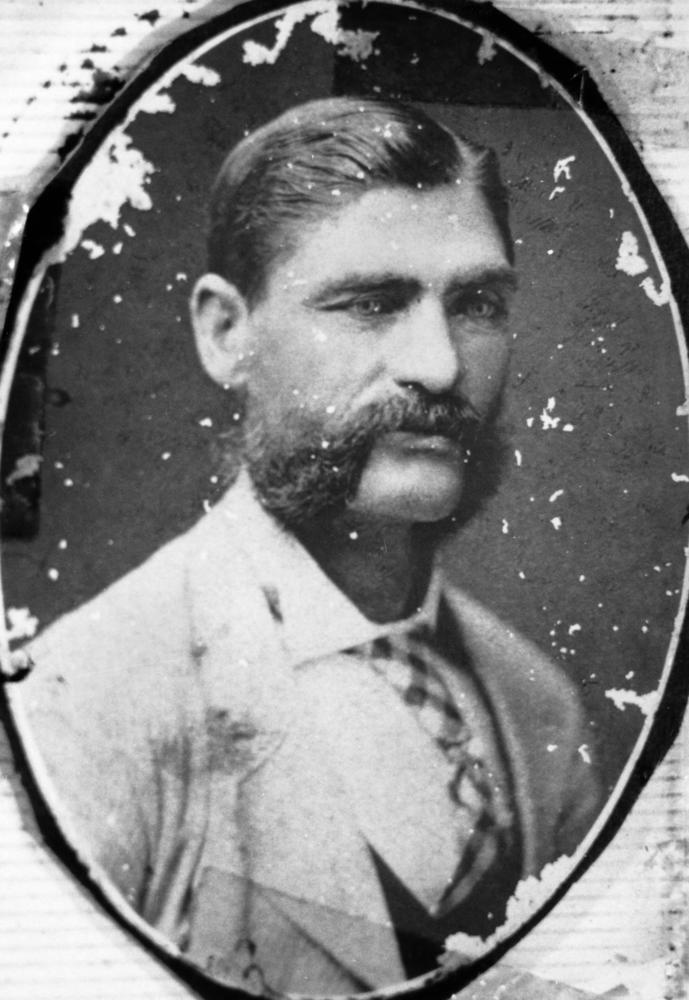
Nanango mail carrier Patrick McCallum who was robbed by Macpherson in 1866.

On 4 March 1864, Macpherson was part of a group of three who 'stuck up' the public house of Richard Willis at Houghton River, wounding Willis, and stealing 'three cabbage tree hats, two pairs of riding pants, one pair of boots, one gun, one crimean shirt, one bottle of whisky, and fourteen pounds of flour'.

Following the robbery, the government offered a £50 reward for the culprit's apprehension, and Macpherson left Queensland for New South Wales, with the aim of joining up with a bushranging gang, that included Ben Hall, Frank Gardiner, John Gilbert and John Dunn. Macpherson is said to have committed highway robberies on his way to find the gang, and to have combined his father's given and mother's maiden name to create the alias John Bruce. Other aliases included Mar, Kerr, Scotia and Scotchie.

On 17 August 1864, Macpherson was almost apprehended by Sir Frederick Pottinger, a New South Wales Police officer, who had earlier pursued Ben Hall and Frank Gardiner, with mixed success. Pottinger later told Police in Brisbane that he encountered Macpherson, who was on foot, and they exchanged fire, both receiving arm wounds, before Macpherson escaped.

Based on information received from Pottinger, a police patrol from Forbes, led by Sgt Condell and accompanied by an Aboriginal tracker, captured Macpherson on 28 February 1865 on the Billabong Creek northwest of Forbes. He was described as 'about five feet nine inches in height, has light hair, blue eyes, florid compaction, and altogether not a forbidding sort of a look about him' with a mark on his arm where Pottinger had wounded him. Macpherson was taken to Forbes, and then Sydney, where he was to face trial for shooting at Pottinger, but before the trial could begin Pottinger fatally shot himself, either accidentally, or as an act of suicide, and, in April 1865, the charge was withdrawn.

Macpherson was still wanted over the Willis public house robbery and was to be returned aboard a coastal steamer, but managed to escape from the custody of the police constable who was escorting him. He began to rob the mail coaches around Maryborough, Gayndah and Gladstone.

In early 1866, Macpherson twice held up the mail delivery between Ipswich and Nanango. Once, while he was on foot, leading him to steal the postman's horse, as well as the mail. The second time he sent £1700 worth of cheques and money orders to the Governor of Queensland Sir George Bowen with a note explaining that he had no need for them. The government raised the reward for his capture to £250.

== Capture and trials ==
Macpherson was eventually captured, not by the police, but members of the public. On 30 March 1866, at Monduran Station near Gin Gin, owned by William Henry Walsh, two station workers, Dougie, and Walsh's nephew Jack, told the station supervisor, William Nott, that they thought they had seen Macpherson as they returned from Gin Gin. The three, and another man called 'Currie', formed an armed party and they found Macpherson about six miles away. Nott called on Macpherson to stand down but they were forced to give chase until Nott threatened to shoot. Macpherson dropped his gun, saying, 'I give myself up', adding, 'I knew you were not the police by the pace at which you followed me down that ridge'. They returned Macpherson to the station, for the night, and then into the custody of the Police at Gin Gin.

Macpherson was taken to the court-house at Maryborough where spectators told the Maryborough Chronicle that they were disappointed with his appearance as he wasn't 'flash' or 'ferocious looking'. He was then remanded to the Brisbane for a Supreme Court trial over the Willis public house robbery, but was found not guilty. He was then returned to Maryborough, to appear, on 13 September 1866, on charges related to robbing the local mails. Macpherson was found guilty and given two twenty-five-year sentences, to be served concurrently, at St Helena Island, Moreton Bay. The presiding Judge noting that the sentence was heavier than would usually have been given for such crimes but he intended for it to have a deterrent effect.

== Later life ==
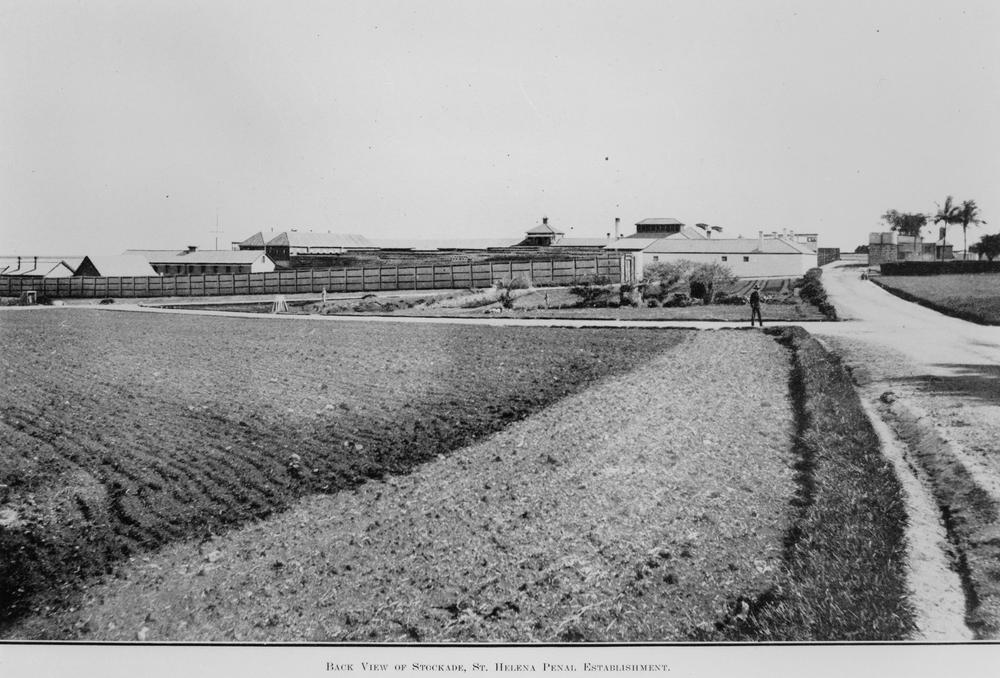
1914 view of the stockade at St Helena Island. Macpherson started his escape attempt from here in 1870.

Macpherson entered St Helena on 14 September 1866, and, on 11 April 1870, while attempting to escape from the island, was shot in the wrist and apprehended with six others who had freed themselves from the stockade and were hiding in the scrub.

In 1874, a petition to request clemency for Macpherson, organised by the Rev. B. G. Wilson, and signed by members of the Queensland parliament, was successful in securing his release on 22 December. Macpherson found work as a stockman at Cressbrook, and later, as an outstation overseer. Another outstation manager at the time was Sylvester Browne, brother of Thomas Alexander Browne, author of the 1882 bushranger novel Robbery Under Arms, leading to suggestion that Macpherson's exploits may have been adapted for the plot.

In 1878, at a private residence in Blackall, Macpherson married Elizabeth Annie Hausfeldt, from Isisford. They went on to have four sons and two daughters.

He died, aged 53, on 23 August 1895 at Burketown, after falling from a horse.

== Legacy ==
Each year, on the third weekend of March, Gin Gin holds a Wild Scotsman Festival, named for Macpherson and his 1866 arrest.
