= Miara, Queensland =

Miara
- Town
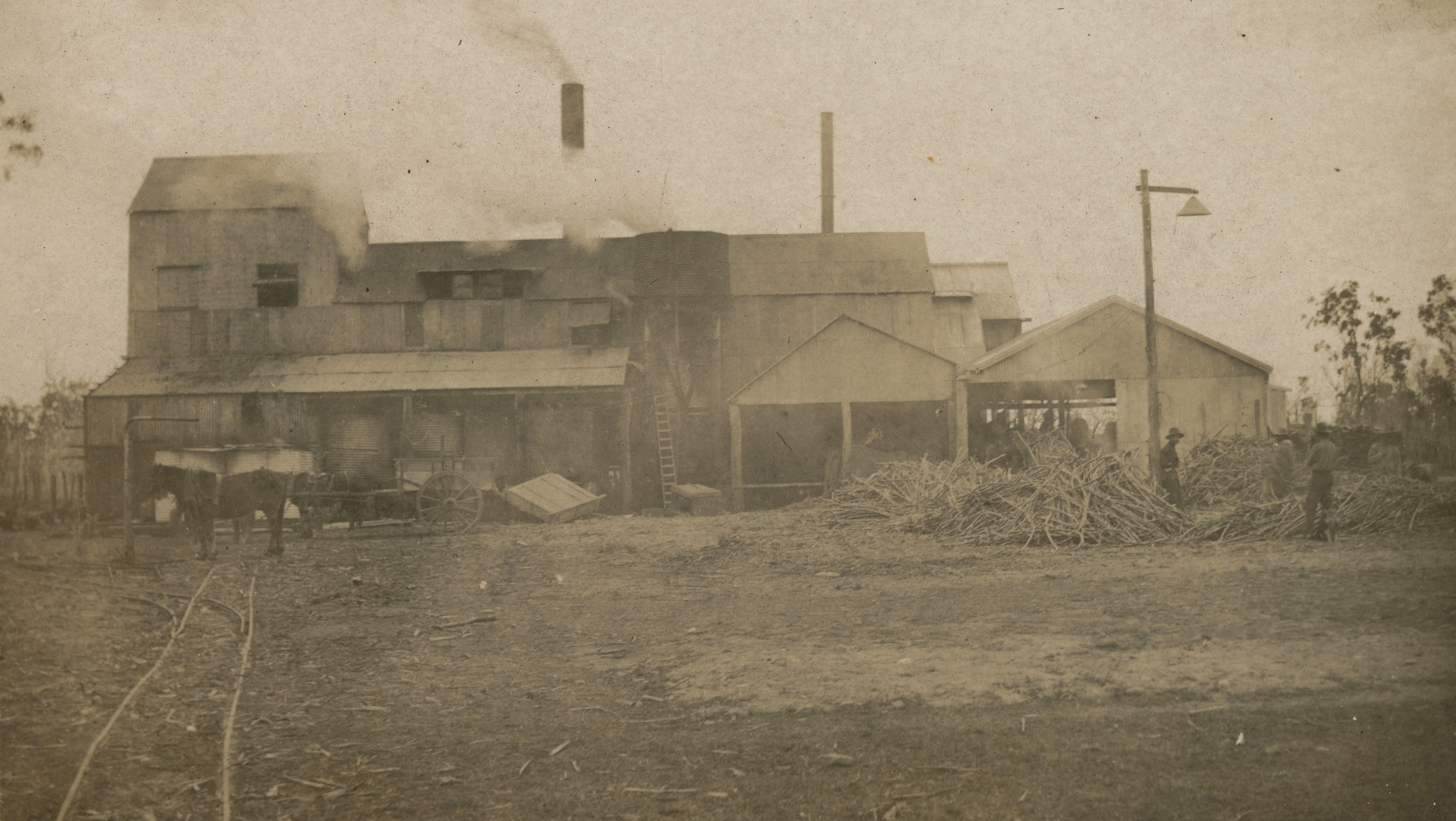
- Miara Sugar Mill

- Interactive map of Miara
- Coordinates: 24.6875°S 152.1697°E
- Country: Australia
- State: Queensland
- LGA: Bundaberg Region
- Location: 11.4 km (7.1 mi) ENE of Yandaran; 39.4 km (24.5 mi) E of Rosedale; 45.2 km (28.1 mi) NW of Bundaberg CBD; 405 km (252 mi) N of Brisbane

Government
  - State electorate: Burnett
  - Federal division: Flynn

Area
  - Total: 47.9 km^{2} (18.5 sq mi)

Population
  - Total: 28 (2021 census)
  - Density: 0.585/km^{2} (1.514/sq mi)
- Time zone: UTC+10:00 (AEST)
- Postcode: 4673
Localities around Miara
| Yandaran | Coral Sea | Coral Sea |
| Yandaran | Miara | Moore Park Beach |
| Yandaran | Avondale | Moore Park Beach |

Miara is a rural town and coastal locality in the Bundaberg Region, Queensland, Australia. In the 2021 census, the locality of Miara had a population of 28 people.

== Geography ==
Yandaran Creek forms the south-eastern boundary, and the Coral Sea the north-eastern.

== History ==
The town's name is believed to be an Aboriginal word from the Kabi language meaning wild woman.

The town site was surveyed in 1884.

In 1887, 11 acres (4.5 ha) of land was reserved for a pilot station on the Coral Sea coast just north of the mouth of the Kolan River (approx 24.6687°S 152.2015°E).

Tenders were called in 1898 to construct a school building. Miara Provisional School opened circa 1899. On 1 January 1909, it became Miara State School. It closed circa 1922. It was on the southern corner in a bend in Miara Road (24.67000°S 152.19292°E).

== Demographics ==
In the 2016 census, the locality of Miara had a population of 38 people.

In the 2021 census, the locality of Miara had a population of 28 people.

== Education ==
There are no schools in Miara. The nearest government primary school is Yandaran State School in neighbouring Yandaran to the south-west. The nearest government secondary school in Rosedale State School in Rosedale to the west.

== Amenities ==
There is a boat ramp on the north bank of Kolan River (24.6764°S 152.1985°E). It is managed by the Bundaberg Regional Council.
