= McIlwraith, Queensland =

McIlwraith
- Suburb
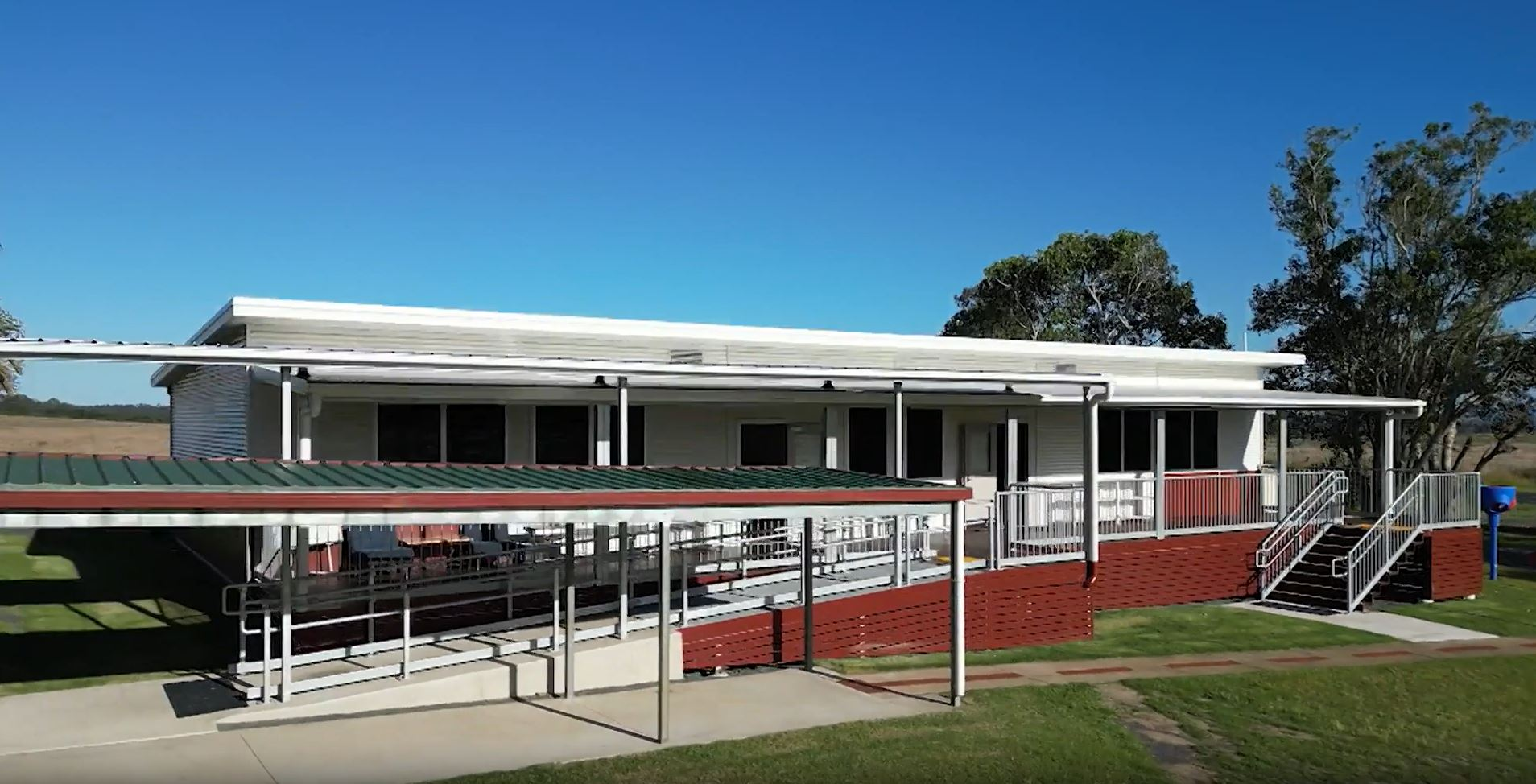
- McIlwraith State School, 2025

- Interactive map of McIlwraith
- Coordinates: 25.0000°S 152.0000°E
- Country: Australia
- State: Queensland
- LGA: Bundaberg Region
- Location: 6.5 km (4.0 mi) E of Gin Gin; 45.8 km (28.5 mi) WSW of Bundaberg; 372 km (231 mi) N of Brisbane

Government
  - State electorate: Callide
  - Federal division: Flynn

Area
  - Total: 23.1 km^{2} (8.9 sq mi)

Population
  - Total: 202 (2021 census)
  - Density: 8.74/km^{2} (22.65/sq mi)
- Time zone: UTC+10:00 (AEST)
- Postcode: 4671
Suburbs around McIlwraith
Gin Gin	Maroondan	Maroondan
Redhill Farms	McIlwraith	Delan
Skyring Reserve	Drinan	Delan

McIlwraith is a rural locality in the Bundaberg Region, Queensland, Australia. In the 2021 census, McIlwraith had a population of 202 people.

== Geography ==
Uping is a neighbourhood within the locality (24.9833°S 152.0000°E). It takes its name from the former Uping railway station (24.9852°S 151.9997°E) on the now-closed Mount Perry railway line.

The locality was also served by McIlwraith railway station (approx 24.99447°S 151.98518°E).

The Bundaberg-Gin Gin Road (State Route 3) runs along the northern boundary of the locality.

== History ==
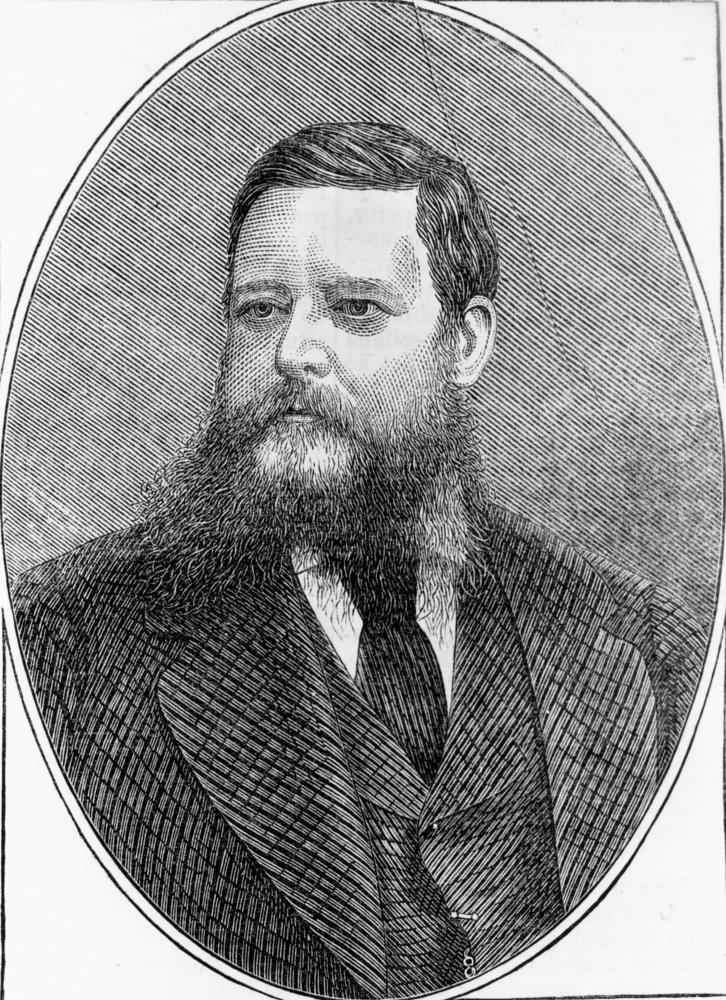
Thomas McIlwraith, 1879

The locality was named after the former railway station, which in turn was named after former Premier of Queensland Thomas McIlwraith.

McIlwraith State School opened on 30 October 1934.

== Demographics ==
In the 2011 census, McIlwraith had a population of 327 people.

In the 2016 census, McIlwraith had a population of 191 people.

In the 2021 census, McIlwraith had a population of 202 people.

== Education ==
McIlwraith State School is a government primary (Prep-6) school for boys and girls at 322 McIlwraith Road (25.0085°S 151.9993°E). In 2017, the school had an enrolment of 21 students with 2 teachers and 5 non-teaching staff (2 full-time equivalent). In 2022, the school had an enrolment of 12 students.

There is no secondary school in McIlwraith; the nearest government secondary school is Gin Gin State High School in neighbouring Gin Gin.
