= Avondale, Queensland =

Avondale
- Town
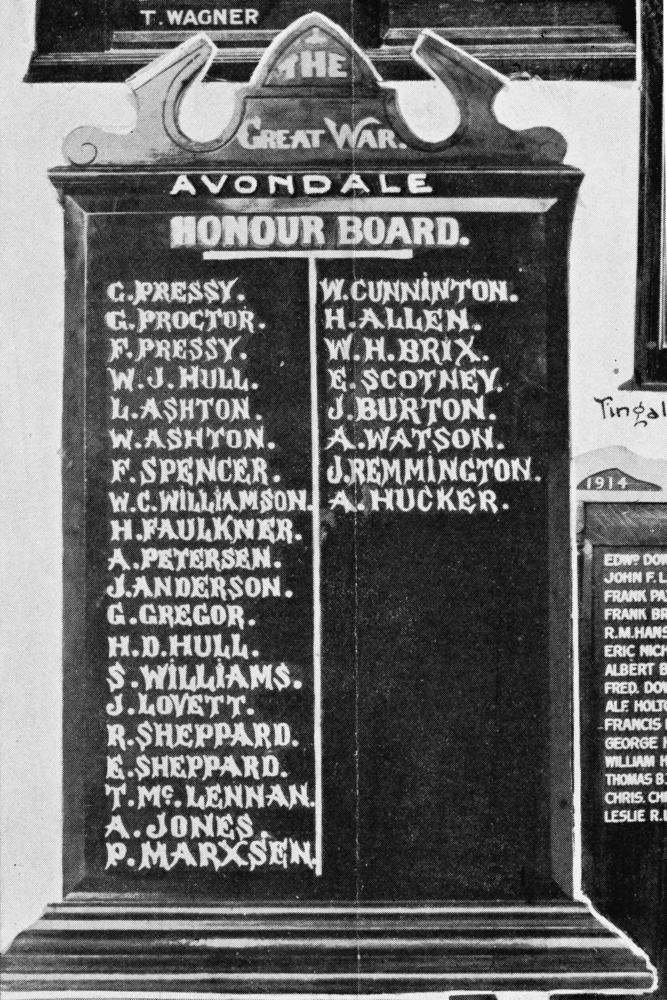
- Avondale honour board, December 1917

- Interactive map of Avondale
- Coordinates: 24.7391°S 152.1608°E
- Country: Australia
- State: Queensland
- LGA: Bundaberg Region
- Location: 25.6 km (15.9 mi) NW of Bundaberg CBD; 441 km (274 mi) N of Brisbane

Government
  - State electorate: Burnett
  - Federal division: Flynn

Area
  - Total: 70.0 km^{2} (27.0 sq mi)

Population
  - Total: 701 (2021 census)
  - Density: 10.014/km^{2} (25.94/sq mi)
- Time zone: UTC+10:00 (AEST)
- Postcode: 4670
Localities around Avondale
Yandaran	Miara	Moore Park Beach
Yandaran	Avondale	Moorland
Bucca	Bucca	Bucca

Avondale is a rural town and locality in the Bundaberg Region, Queensland, Australia. In the 2021 census, the locality of Avondale had a population of 701 people.

== Geography ==
The Kolan River forms the southern and eastern boundary of the locality.

The North Coast railway line passes through the north-east of the locality where the town of Avondale is located. The town is served by the Avondale railway station (24.7376°S 152.1567°E).

Avondale is farming and grazing land.

== History ==
The area was originally known as Kolan. However, on 19 March 1931, the name was changed to Avondale to match the railway station name, which took its name from an adjacent property.

In September 1891, the Avondale Estate was advertised for auction by W.E.Curtis, consisting of 66 agricultural farms from 25 to 45 acres each; 100 quarter acre lots and a few garden lots from 2 1/2 to 4 acres each. A map advertising the sale stated that the auctioneer was instructed by the owners Messrs Brown & Johnston to sell by public auction at his rooms, Bundaberg, Saturday Sept. 26th, 1891 subs. of por. 5, 9 & 10, Parish of Yandaran, County of Cook, Q'land, and 100 quarter-acre lots, and some garden lots, in same por. & farms 25 & 45 acres each. "The estate is bounded on three sides by salt water, viz Kolan River and Yandaran Creek, both of which are navigable". The map states the Estate is only 16 miles from Bundaberg connected by railway.

The Avondale Provisional School was opened on 8 February 1895. It became Avondale State School on 1 January 1909.

== Demographics ==
In the 2016 census, the locality of Avondale had a population of 643 people.

In the 2021 census, the locality of Avondale had a population of 701 people.

== Heritage listings ==
The heritage-listed sites in Avondale include:

- Avondale Cemetery, corner of Avondale Road and Mullers Road (24.7381°S 152.1633°E)

== Education ==
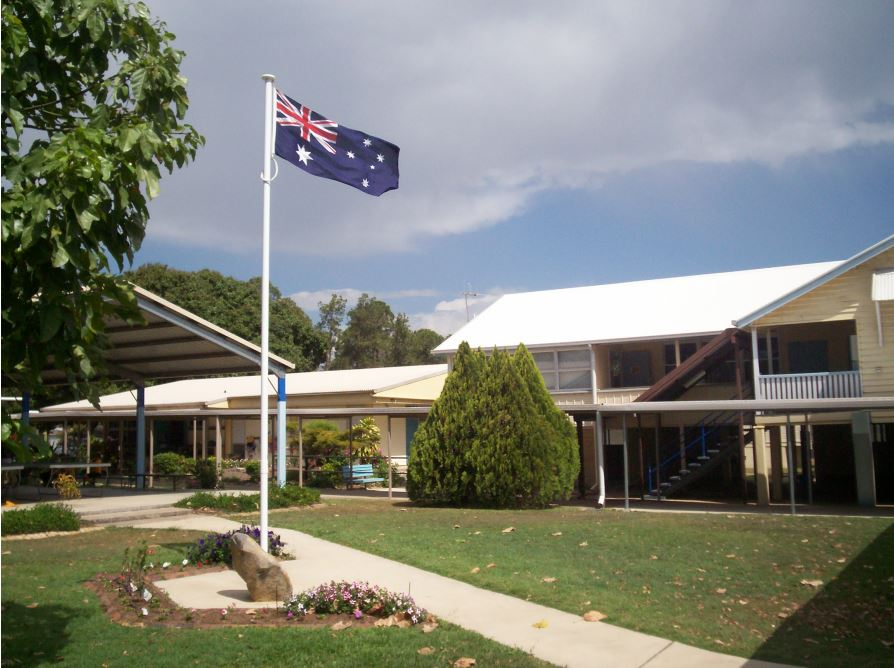
Avondale State School, 2019

Avondale State School is a government primary (Prep-6) school for boys and girls at 371 Avondale Road (24.7358°S 152.1606°E). In 2016, the school had an enrolment of 20 students with 2 teachers and 4 non-teaching staff (2 equivalent full-time). In 2018, the school had an enrolment of 12 students with 2 teachers (1 full-time equivalent) and 5 non-teaching staff (2 full-time equivalent).

There are no secondary schools in Avondale. The nearest government secondary schools are Bundaberg North State High School (to Year 12) in Bundaberg North to the south-east and Rosedale State School (to Year 12) in Rosedale to the north-west.
