= Maroondan, Queensland =

Maroondan
- Suburb
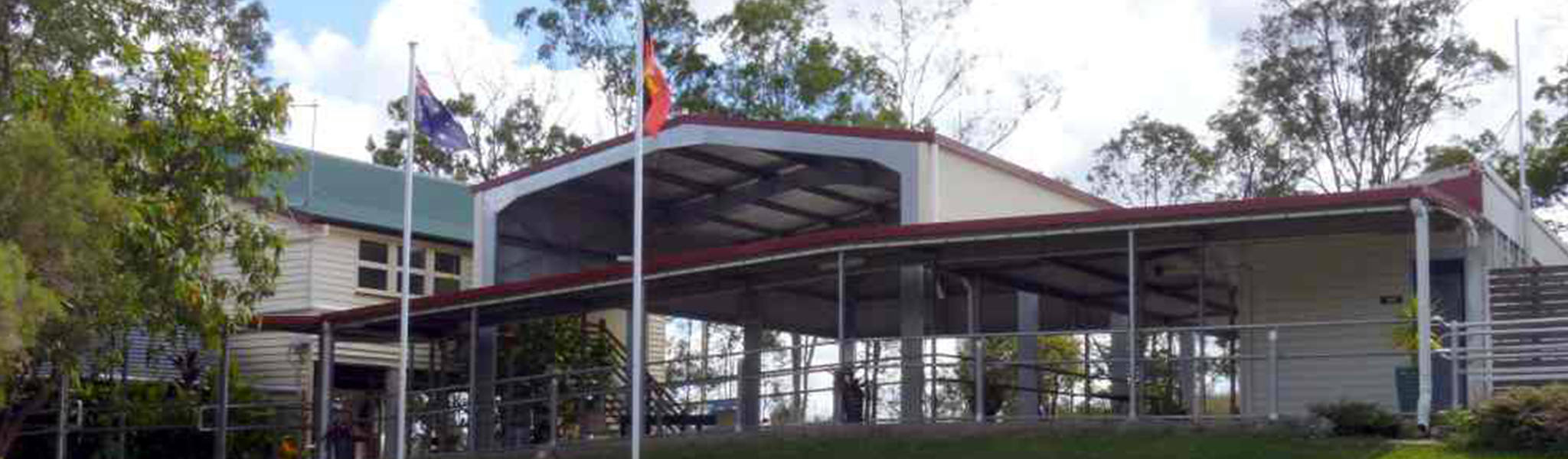
- Maroondan State School, 2025

- Interactive map of Maroondan
- Coordinates: 24.9650°S 152.0191°E
- Country: Australia
- State: Queensland
- LGA: Bundaberg Region
- Location: 10.7 km (6.6 mi) ENE of Gin Gin; 43.3 km (26.9 mi) WSW of Bundaberg; 360 km (220 mi) NNW of Brisbane

Government
  - State electorate: Callide
  - Federal division: Flynn

Area
  - Total: 20.1 km^{2} (7.8 sq mi)

Population
  - Total: 346 (2021 census)
  - Density: 17.21/km^{2} (44.58/sq mi)
- Time zone: UTC+10:00 (AEST)
- Postcode: 4671
Suburbs around Maroondan
Damascus	Bullyard	Bullyard
Gin Gin	Maroondan	Bullyard
McIlwraith	McIlwraith	Delan

Maroondan is a rural locality in the Bundaberg Region, Queensland, Australia. In the 2021 census, Maroondan had a population of 346 people.

== Geography ==
The Bundaberg-Gin Gin Road (State Route 3) runs through from east to west.

== History ==
The locality takes its name from the Maroondan railway station. Maroondah is an Aboriginal word in the Waka language meaning sand goanna.

The first Maroondan State School opened in 1909 and was renamed Uping State School circa 1927. It closed circa 1934.

The second Maroondan State School opened on 25 August 1927. This school may have been originally known as Maroondah Station State School.

== Demographics ==
In the 2016 census, Maroondan had a population of 346 people.

In the 2021 census, Maroondan had a population of 346 people.

== Education ==
Maroondan State School is a government primary (Prep-6) school for boys and girls at 31 Duke Stehbens Road (24.9684°S 152.0143°E). In 2018, the school had an enrolment of 41 students with 3 teachers (2 full-time equivalent) and 7 non-teaching staff (3 full-time equivalent).

There are no secondary schools in Maroondah. The nearest government secondary school is Gin Gin State High School in neighbouring Gin Gin to the west.
