= Avondale railway station, Queensland =

Former railway station in Queensland, Australia

Avondale

General information
- Location: Railway Lane, Avondale, Queensland
- Coordinates: 24.7376°S 152.1567°E
- Line: North Coast Line
- Connections: no connections

Services
Preceding station	Queensland Rail	Following station
Moorland towards Brisbane	North Coast line	Yandaran towards Cairns
Location

Avondale railway station is a railway station on the North Coast railway line in the Bundaberg Region, Queensland, Australia. Most of the buildings of the station remain including the station platform and goods sheds.

It is possible to cross the railway tracks on foot just east of the old station at a marked crossing.

A little further east between the station and the river is Avondale Road, with a bridge over the train line where the train descends (when heading east) through a cutting before it crosses the Yandaran Creek via a railway bridge. From the Avondale Road bridge it is possible to get a good view of the goods trains crossing the river.
