= Bullyard =

- Town
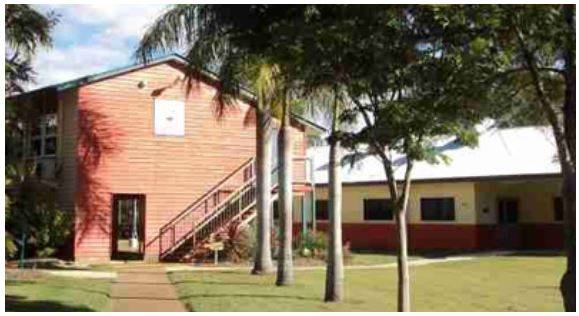
- Bullyard State School, 2025

- Interactive map of Bullyard
- Coordinates: 24.9519°S 152.0608°E
- Country: Australia
- State: Queensland
- LGA: Bundaberg Region
- Location: 37.1 km (23.1 mi) SWS of Bundaberg; 370 km (230 mi) N of Brisbane

Government
  - State electorate: Burnett
  - Federal division: Hinkler

Area
  - Total: 34.2 km^{2} (13.2 sq mi)

Population
  - Total: 206 (2021 census)
  - Density: 6.023/km^{2} (15.60/sq mi)
- Postcode: 4671
Localities around Bullyard
Damascus	Bucca	Bucca
Maroondan	Bullyard	Bucca
Maroondan	Delan	Bungadoo

Bullyard is a rural town and locality in Bundaberg Region, Queensland, Australia. In the 2021 census, the locality of Bullyard had a population of 206 people.

== Geography ==
Bullyard is located off the Bruce Highway in Central Queensland, approximately 37 kilometres (23 mi) west of Bundaberg and 358 kilometres (222 mi) north-west of Brisbane, the state capital. The Bundaberg-Gin Gin Road (State Route 3) runs through from east to west.

It is a small community made up mostly of sugar cane growers, livestock & fruit and vegetable farmers.

Among the fruit and vegetable farms in the Bullyard area are tomato, mango, pineapple and potatoes.

=== Tagon ===
The neighbourhood of Tagon is located in the south of Bullyard (24.9666°S 152.0500°E); it takes its name from the former Tagon railway station on the now closed Mount Perry railway line. Tagon is an Aboriginal word for a particular species of tree.

== History ==
The town of Bullyard was developed primarily as a cane farming district in the late nineteenth century. The name, however, apparently relates to when a drover named Charles holmes was transporting bulls between Walla and Tantitha stations and he constructed a temporary yard for the bulls, hence "Bullyard". A railway station, called Kolan Railway Station, was erected in 1881 (on the Bundaberg-Mount Perry railway line, completed in 1884) and timber from the surrounding area was loaded onto trains there. Closer settlement, however, appears to have occurred somewhat later. The district was dominated by cane farms supplying the nearby Bingera Sugar Mill.

Bullyard Provisional School opened on 20 May 1901.On 1 January 1909, it became Bullyard State School. A new school building was built in 1933.

Bullyard Post Office opened on 1 July 1927 (a receiving office had been open from 1893, known as Kolan until 1897) and closed in 1972.

On 29 November 1992, nearby Bucca was hit by the most violent tornado ever observed in Australia, rated F4 on the Fujita scale. Being only 15 kilometres (9.3 mi) away, Bullyard residents felt the brunt of the weather that came with the twister, reporting torrential rain and giant hailstones, described as the size of a "cricket ball". Across the region trees toppled in the unprecedented winds and many residents experienced roofing issues during this time.

== Demographics ==
In the 2016 census, the locality of Bullyard had a population of 189 people.

In the 2021 census, the locality of Bullyard had a population of 206 people.

== Education ==
Bullyard State School is a government primary (Prep-6) school for boys and girls at 2358 Bucca Road (24.9500°S 152.0612°E). In 2018, the school had an enrolment of 41 students with 4 teachers (3 full-time equivalent) and 5 non-teaching staff (3 full-time equivalent).

There are no secondary schools in Bullyard. The nearest government secondary school is Gin Gin State High School in Gin Gin to the south-west.

== Bullyard Hall ==
Across from the state school is the Bullyard Multipurpose Hall. It was used annually for the Bullyard Oktoberfest and various other school and community meetings and presentations.

Bullyard Hall was built in 1908 by Samuel Kent on 10 acres of land purchased for that purpose. The hall was connected to electricity in 1952 and the hall was extended in 1957 with a bigger dance floor. Other additions included a stage, kitchen and ladies' room. The hall was repainted in the 1960s, with the exterior painted with linseed oil and burnt umber (giving the hall its distinctive appearance).

The hall was, like other local public halls, used for social events such as dances. Movies were shown at the hall from the 1920s and it was also used for church services. Newspaper references from the 1930s through to the 1950s indicate the hall being used as a venue to sign up workers for the local cane crushing season.

The hall grounds were also used for a range of sporting events. There are references to athletics competitions held at Bullyard from 1911 and the track was improved in 1913. A tennis club was formed in 1928 and tennis courts were constructed using crushed ant bed. Cricket was popular, so much so that the Cricket Club merged with the Hall Committee in 1930. Bullyard hosted cricket matches against local teams including Wallaville, Albionville, Gin Gin, Bucca and Bundaberg and the pitch was also constructed from ant bed, similar to the tennis courts.

Bullyard Hall is located in the south-western corner of a 4 hectare reserve that in turn is located in the northern part of town on the eastern side of Bucca Road. A mostly circular fenced sports ground extends from the hall to the north and east. Most of the fenced, predominantly levelled grassed site has been cleared, some remaining scrub vegetation exists in the north and northeast and on the boundaries and it appears that the ring of trees on the perimeter of the sports ground have been deliberately planted. The hall consists of a low set weatherboard clad timber structure on timber stumps with a slight variation in height to level out the site and features a corrugated iron clad gable roof. An annex with skillion roof is attached on both sides of the main building. The main entrance is from the front via some steps onto a landing covered by a gable roof and double doors.
