= Fred Haigh Dam =

- Location of the dam in Queensland
- Interactive map of Fred Haigh Dam
- Country: Australia
- Location: Gin Gin, 50 km (31 mi) west of Bundaberg, Wide Bay–Burnett, Queensland
- Coordinates: 24°52′15″S 151°51′02″E
- Purpose: Irrigation
- Status: Operational
- Construction began: 13 November 1971
- Opening date: 1975
- Built by: K. D. Morris
- Operator: SunWater

Dam and spillways
- Type of dam: Rock-fill dam
- Impounds: Kolan River
- Height (foundation): 49 m (161 ft)
- Length: 646 m (2,119 ft)
- Dam volume: 1,060×10^{3} m^{3} (37×10^{6} cu ft)
- Spillway type: Uncontrolled
- Spillway capacity: 2,270 m^{3}/s (80,000 cu ft/s)

Reservoir
- Creates: Lake Monduran
- Total capacity: 562,045 ML (455,657 acre⋅ft)
- Catchment area: 1,308 km^{2} (505 sq mi)
- Surface area: 5,340 ha (13,200 acres)
- Maximum water depth: 43 m (141 ft)
- Normal elevation: 66 m (217 ft) AHD

The Fred Haigh Dam (also called Monduran Dam) is a rock-filled embankment dam across the Kolan River, located near Gin Gin, in the Bundaberg Region of Wide Bay–Burnett, Queensland, Australia. The dam was completed in 1975 for the purpose of irrigation of adjacent farming lands for the cultivation of sugar crops and created Lake Monduran. The dam is named after Frederick Haigh, the Queensland's Commissioner of Irrigation and Water Supply from 1955 to 1974. The Monduran Dam, under construction at the time of his death, was named in his honour upon completion.

== History ==
The dam was built to create a more reliable water supply for the sugarcane industry, as rainfall was not always reliable and underground water supplies were dwindling. Construction began on 13 November 1971 with a ceremony in which, Reg Swartz, Minister for National Development, initiated an explosion which blasted away tons of rock at the site and then unveiled a commemorative plaque. The dam was completed in late 1974 with the first release of water on 17 February 1975.

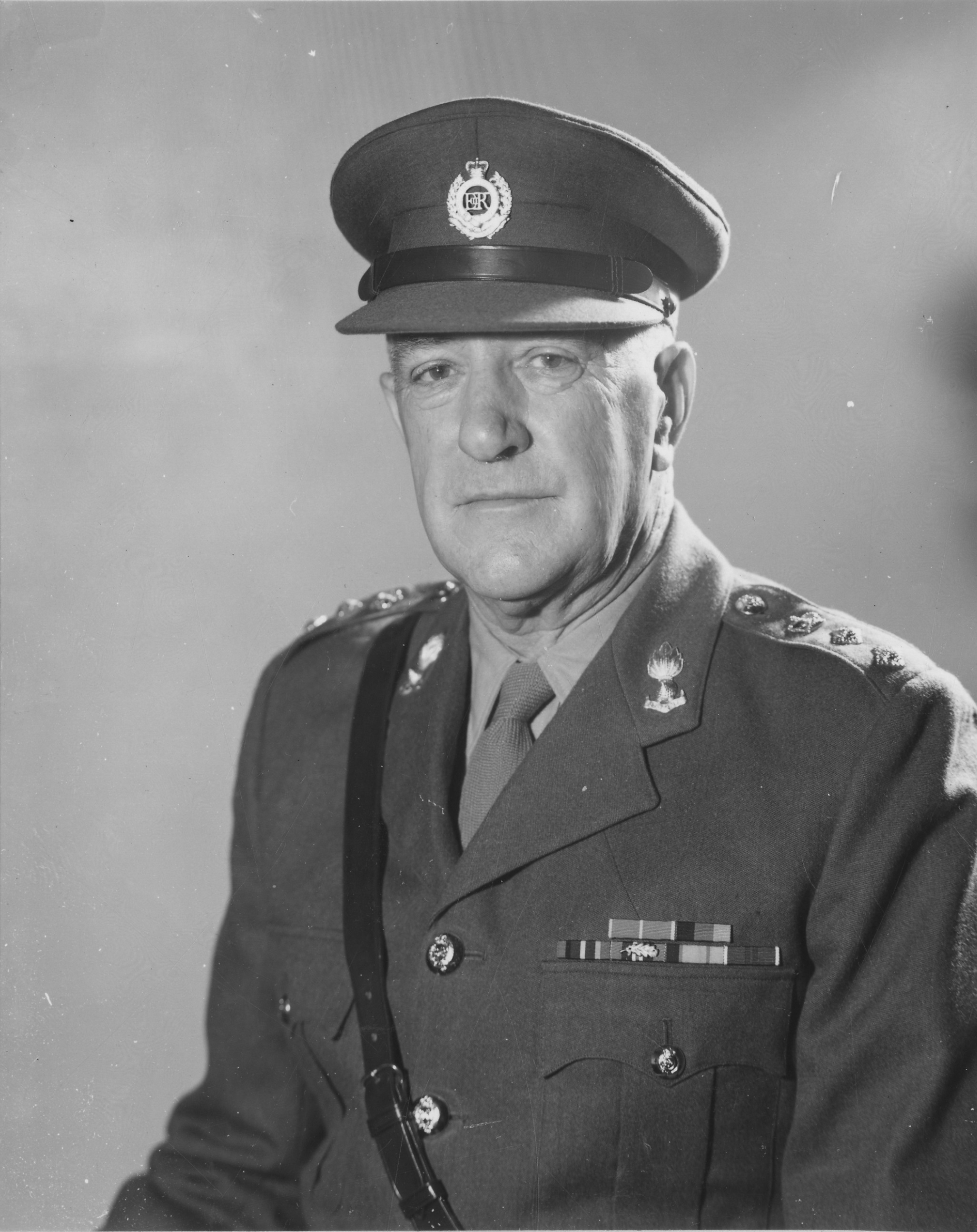
Fred Haigh, June 1973

The dam was originally to be called Monduran Dam. However, the Queensland Water Commissioner, Fred Haigh, had been a major driving force behind the dam and, following his sudden death on 15 July 1974, the Queensland Cabinet renamed the dam in his honour in 1979, retaining the name Monduran for the lake it created, officially named on 1 January 1980 and gazetted on 5 January 1980.

The dam is 49 metres (161 ft) high and 646 metres (2,119 ft) long and holds back 562,045 megalitres (455,657 acre⋅ft) when full. The resultant reservoir, Lake Monduran, has a surface area of 5,340 hectares (13,200 acres) and draws from a catchment area of 1,308 square kilometres (505 sq mi), located north of Bundaberg. The lowest level recorded was 3.29% in February 2003 during the Millennium drought, and the highest level of 181.5% was recorded in January 2013 as a result of heavy rains from ex-Tropical Cyclone Oswald, when the water reached 6.86 metres (22.5 ft) over the spillway.

In 2008, SunWater announced that an upgrade of the dam's spillway was planned to ensure high levels of safety, and expected the upgrade to be completed before 2010.

== Recreation activities ==
There are no boating restrictions on the lake and there is a single boat ramp for boat access.

The dam was stocked with barramundi, silver perch, sooty grunter and red-claw crayfish with spangled perch and forktail catfish naturally present. A Stocked Impoundment Permit is required to fish in the dam.

== See also ==
- List of dams and reservoirs in Australia
