= Yandaran, Queensland =

Yandaran
- Town
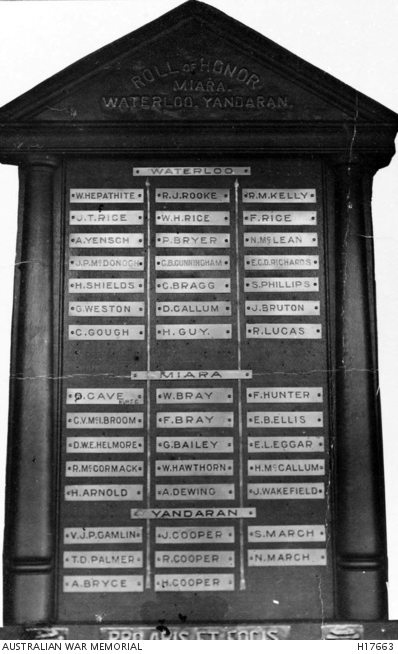
- World War I Roll of Honour which covered the areas of Yandaran, Waterloo and Miara

- Interactive map of Yandaran
- Coordinates: 24.7236°S 152.1133°E
- Country: Australia
- State: Queensland
- LGA: Bundaberg Region
- Location: 28.0 km (17.4 mi) SE of Rosedale; 33.7 km (20.9 mi) NW of Bundaberg; 394 km (245 mi) N of Brisbane

Government
  - State electorate: Burnett
  - Federal division: Flynn

Area
  - Total: 132.9 km^{2} (51.3 sq mi)

Population
  - Total: 475 (2021 census)
  - Density: 3.574/km^{2} (9.257/sq mi)
- Time zone: UTC+10:00 (AEST)
- Postcode: 4673
Localities around Yandaran
Mullett Creek	Mullett Creek	Coral Sea
Waterloo	Yandaran	Miara
Abbotsford	Bucca	Avondale

Yandaran is a rural town and coastal locality in the Bundaberg Region, Queensland, Australia. In the 2021 census, the locality of Yandaran had a population of 475 people.

== Geography ==
Although predominantly inland, the north-east boundary of the locality is the Coral Sea. The North Coast railway line passes through the locality from the east, past the town and exits the locality to the north. The town is served by the Yandaran railway station (24.7208°S 152.1135°E), while there are two other stations Littabella (24.6849°N 152.0781°E) and Takoka serving the northern part of the locality.

== History ==
The name Yandaran was probably first applied to the railway station and is believed to be an Aboriginal name meaning watershed.

Yandaran Creek Provisional School opened on 14 September 1886, becoming Yandaran Creek State School on 1 January 1909. Due to low student numbers, it closed on 31 December 1942, but reopened on 1 May 1944. It closed permanently on 28 January 1957.

Yandaran State School opened on 7 Apr 1919.

Littebella Creek Provisional School opened in 1899. On 1 January 1909, it became Littebella Creek State School. It closed circa 1935.

== Demographics ==
In the 2016 census, the locality of Yandaran had a population of 463 people.

In the 2021 census, the locality of Yandaran had a population of 475 people.

== Education ==
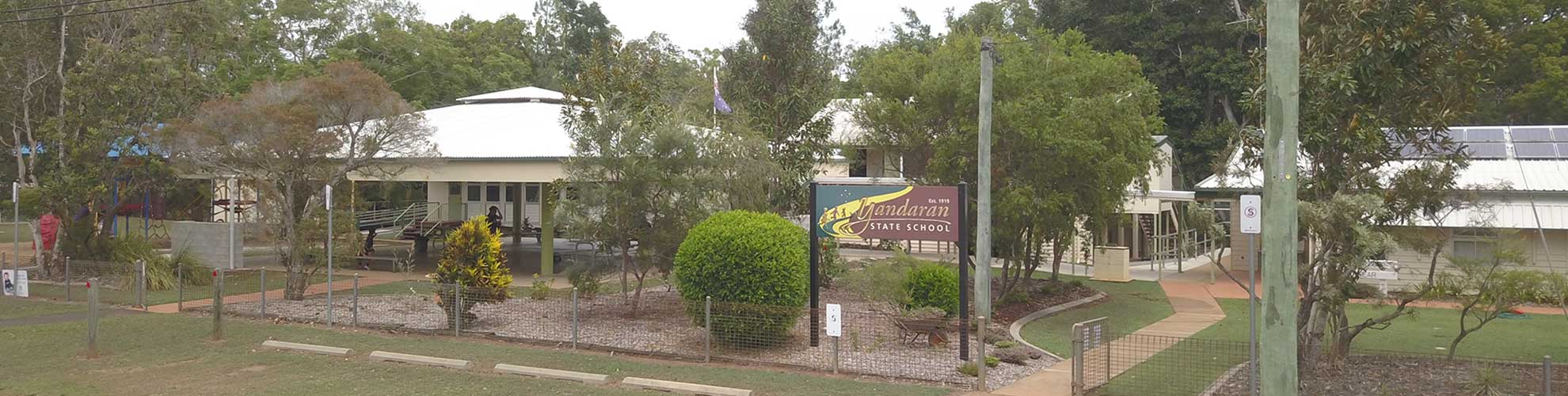
Yandaran State School, 2024

Yandaran State School is a government primary (Prep-6) school for boys and girls at School Lane (24.7243°S 152.1121°E). In 2016, the school had an enrolment of 25 students with 3 teachers (2 full-time equivalent) and 5 non-teaching staff (2 full-time equivalent). In 2018, the school had an enrolment of 23 students with 3 teachers (2 full-time equivalent) and 10 non-teaching staff (3 full-time equivalent).

There are no secondary schools in Yandaran. The nearest government secondary schools are Rosedale State School (to Year 12) in Rosedale to the west and Bundaberg North State High School (to Year 12) in Bundaberg North to the south-east.

== Community groups ==
The Yandaran branch of the Queensland Country Women's Association meets at the QCWA Hall at 21 Main Street.
