= Kolan River =

Kolan
- Location of Kolan River mouth in Queensland
- Etymology: Kabi: kalang, meaning good

Location
- Country: Australia
- State: Queensland
- Region: Central Queensland

Physical characteristics
- Source: Dawes, Bobby, and Burnett Range
  - location: southwest of Miriam Vale
  - coordinates: 24°32′42″S 151°28′40″E
  - elevation: 515 m (1,690 ft)
- Mouth: Coral Sea
  - location: north of Moore Park
  - coordinates: 24°38′51″S 152°11′05″E
  - elevation: 0 m (0 ft)
- Length: 195 km (121 mi)
- Basin size: 2,795 km^{2} (1,079 sq mi)

Basin features
- Tributaries
  - right: Gin-Gin Creek
- Regional park: Mouth of Kolan River Regional Park

The Kolan River is a river in the Bundaberg Region, Queensland, Australia.

The river rises in the Bobby Range, below the Dawes Range in the north-east, and the Burnett Range in the south-west. The river flows generally south and then east towards the settlement of Toweran where the Bruce Highway crosses the river. From this point the river flows south by east and enters Lake Monduran, formed in 1978 by the damming of the river to mitigate severe flooding in the river's lower reaches. The river then flows east and then finally north by east and reaches its mouth north of Moore Park. The Kolan River is joined by nineteen tributaries including the main tributary, Gin-Gin Creek, a watercourse that is 92 kilometres (57 mi) long. The lower reaches of the river are surrounded by sugar cane fields. The Mouth of Kolan River Regional Park is a protected area at the river mouth. The river descends 515 metres (1,690 ft) over its 195-kilometre (121 mi) course.

Other water storage facilities that are supplied with water from the river include the Bucca Weir and the Kolan Barrage.

Macfadyena unguis-cati, commonly known as cats claw creeper, is a rapidly growing clinging vine that has been killing gum trees on the banks of the Kolan River, leaving damaged tracts of riverbank. In 2007 a water hyacinth outbreak occurred within the Kolan River system.

The name of the river is derived from a Gubbi-Gubbi expression, kalang, meaning good.

== See also ==
- List of rivers of Australia § Queensland
