= Gin Gin, Queensland =

Gin Gin
- Town
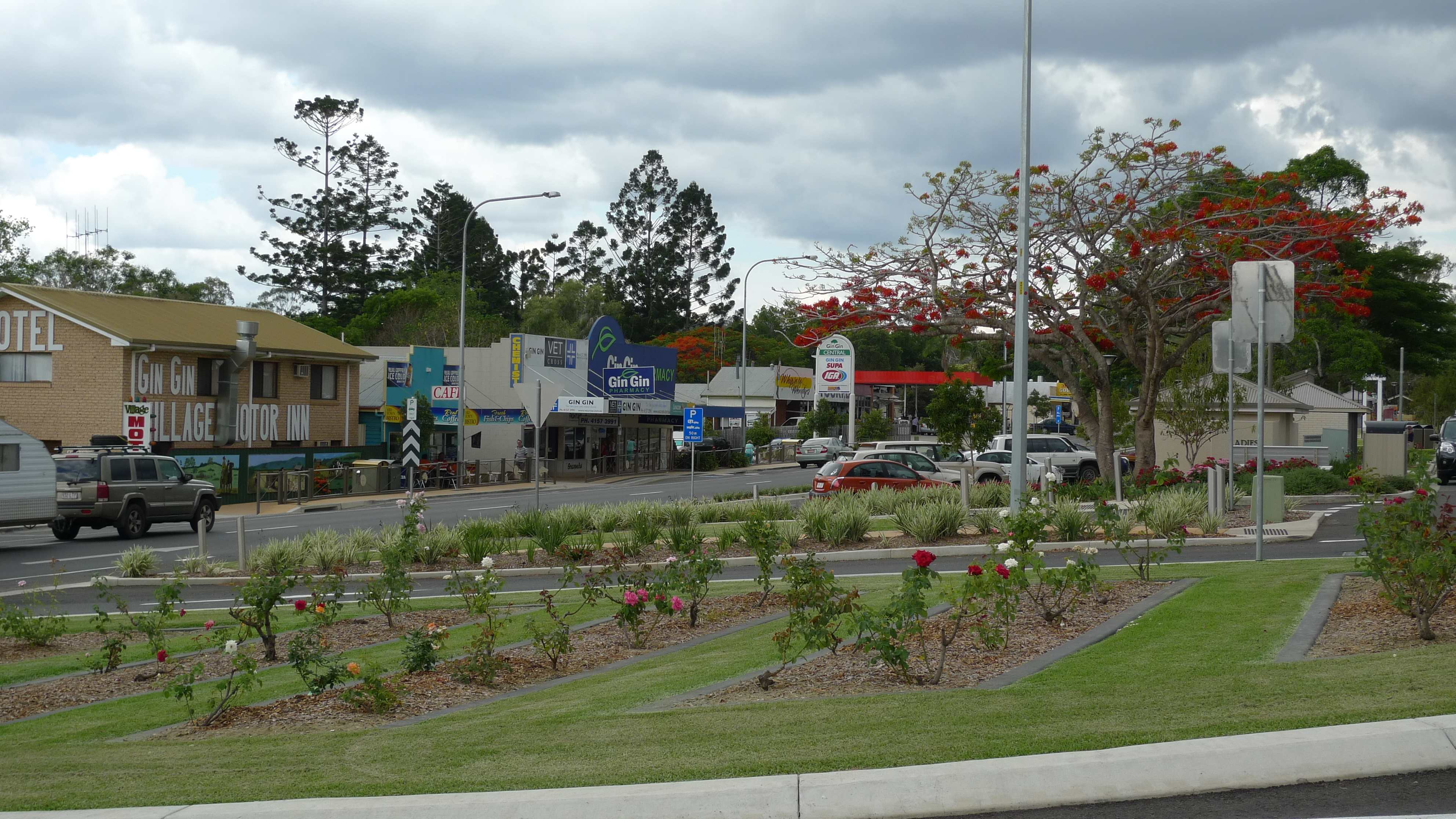
- Bruce Highway passing through Gin Gin

- Interactive map of Gin Gin
- Coordinates: 24.9908°S 151.9558°E
- Country: Australia
- State: Queensland
- LGA: Bundaberg Region
- Location: 49.4 km (30.7 mi) WSW of Bundaberg CBD; 347 km (216 mi) NNW of Brisbane

Government
  - State electorate: Callide
  - Federal division: Flynn

Area
  - Total: 33.9 km^{2} (13.1 sq mi)

Population
  - Total: 1,139 (2021 census)
  - Density: 33.60/km^{2} (87.02/sq mi)
- Time zone: UTC+10:00 (AEST)
- Postcode: 4671
Localities around Gin Gin
Monduran	Damascus	Maroondan
Moolboolaman	Gin Gin	McIlwraith
Tirroan	Redhill Farms	McIlwraith

Gin Gin is a rural town and locality in the Bundaberg Region, Queensland, Australia. In the 2021 census, the locality of Gin Gin had a population of 1,139.

== Geography ==
Gin Gin is located on the Bruce Highway, approximately 51 km west of Bundaberg and 370 km north-west of Brisbane, the state capital.

Bundaberg–Gin Gin Road (State Route 3) runs east from the Bruce Highway, and Gin Gin–Mount Perry–Monto Road runs west from the highway.

== History ==
Gureng Gureng (also known as Gooreng Gooreng, Goreng Goreng, Goeng, Gurang, Goorang Goorang, Korenggoreng) is an Australian Aboriginal language spoken by the Gureng Gureng people. The Gooreng Gooreng language region includes the towns of Bundaberg, Gin Gin and Miriam Vale extending south towards Childers, inland to Monto and Mt Perry.

The town name Gin Gin may have derived from a local Aboriginal word, possibly from the Kabi "kwin kwin", or "chin chin" (a scrub), or "gwin gwin" (red soil).

European settlement of the region began in 1848 when Gregory Blaxland Jnr (son of the explorer Gregory Blaxland) together with William Forster brought their flocks of sheep up from their squatting leases on the Clarence River. The pastoral run they selected extended all the way to the coast and they called it Tirroan. The modern town of Gin Gin is located close to where the original homestead was constructed. The local Aboriginal people murdered Blaxland in August 1850 and two shepherd boys the year previously. Two large massacres of Aboriginal people were conducted by local squatters and their stockmen as punitive measures for these deaths.

About 1851, Arthur and Alfred Henry Brown bought Tirroan from William Forster and renamed the run Gin Gin. The Brown Brothers previously owned a pastoral property called Gin Gin in Western Australia.

The run was later purchased by Sir Thomas McIlwraith, who was Premier of Queensland three times between 1879 and 1893.

The Gin Gin district is nicknamed Wild Scotsman Country due to the capture of one of Queensland's few bushrangers, James Alpin McPherson, in the area on 30 March 1866. McPherson, who went by the same nickname, was captured at Monduran Station, 13 kilometres (8.1 mi) north of town.

Gin Gin Post Office opened on 15 March 1875.

The town was first surveyed in 1880.

Gin Gin Provisional School opened on 26 June 1882. On 3 November 1890, it became Gin Gin State School with 8 students under teacher Arthur William Moore. In 1956, the school expanded to offer secondary schooling, until a separate Gin Gin State High School was established on 1 February 1972. Gin Gin State Pre-School opened on 25 October 1977 and closed in 2006 when it was absorbed into Gin Gin State School.

In 1887, 8,900 ha of land were resumed from the Gin Gin pastoral run. The land was offered for selection for the establishment of small farms on 17 April 1887.

The Gin Gin Library opened in 1992.

== Demographics ==
In the 2021 census, the locality of Gin Gin had a population of 1,139.

In the 2016 census, the locality of Gin Gin had a population of 1,053.

In the 2011 census, Gin Gin had a population of 1,190.

At the 2006 census, Gin Gin had a population of 892.

== Heritage listings ==
Gin Gin has a number of heritage-listed sites, including:

- Mulgrave Street: Gin Gin railway station
- Northern corner of Village Lane and Kookaburra Park Drive, Kookaburra Park Eco Village (24.9839°S 151.9870°E): Allen Brothers' Slab Hut

== Economy ==
Gin Gin, like Bundaberg, is heavily dependent on the sugar industry, with sugarcane plantations dotted throughout the area. An extensive system of sugar cane tramways service the area. Cattle production also features prominently. In recent years small cropping has taken off across farms in the district, with varied success.

== Education ==
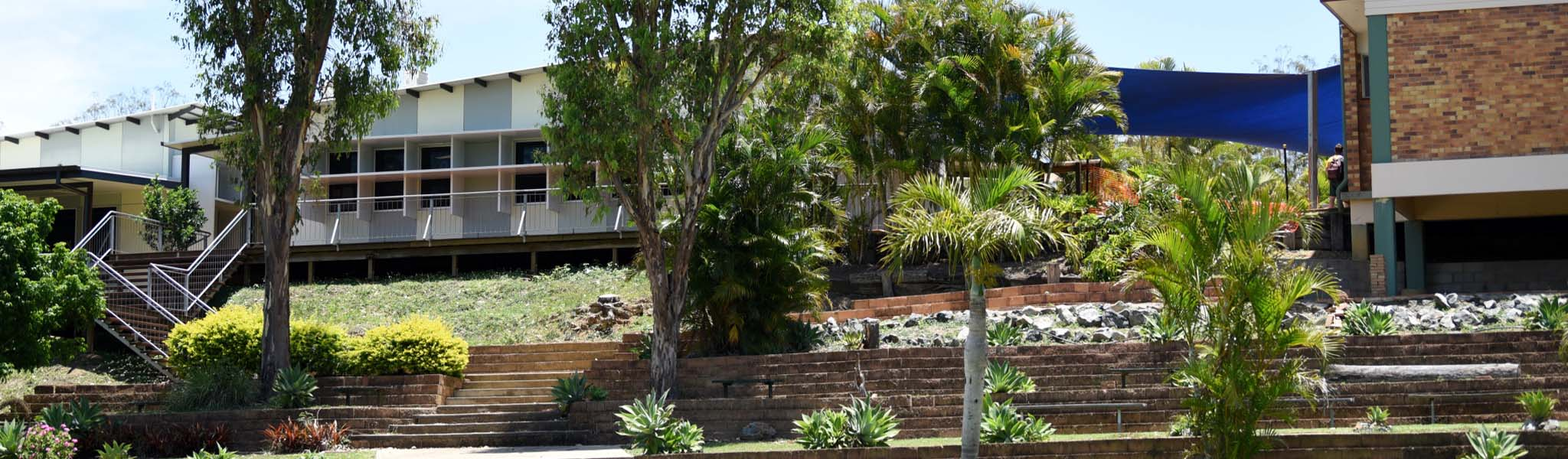
Gin Gin State High School, 2023

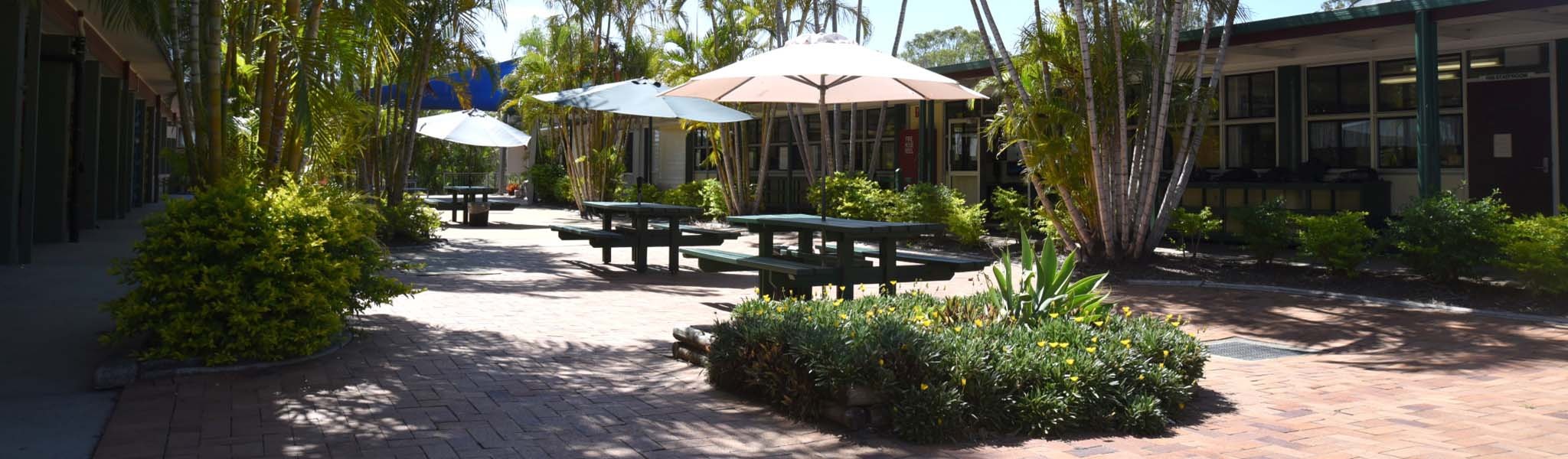
Gin Gin State High School outdoor area, 2023

Gin Gin State School is a government primary (Prep–6) school for boys and girls at 13 May Street (24.9924°S 151.9551°E). In 2017, the school had an enrolment of 290 students with 21 teachers (20 full-time equivalent) and 18 non-teaching staff (11 full-time equivalent). In 2023, the school had an enrolment of 252 students. It includes a special education program.

Gin Gin State High School is a government secondary (7–12) school for boys and girls at 30 High School Road (24.9906°S 151.9689°E). In 2017, the school had an enrolment of 450 students with 45 teachers (43 full-time equivalent) and 31 non-teaching staff (20 full-time equivalent). In 2022, the school had an enrolment of 464 students with 43 teachers (41 full-time equivalent) and 28 non-teaching staff (21 full-time equivalent). It includes a special education program. As well as the students from Gin Gin itself, many students travel, mainly by bus, from surrounding properties and townships like Wallaville, Bullyard, Tirroan, McIlwraith, Maroondan and Mount Perry.

== Amenities ==
The Bundaberg Regional Council operates a public library at 4 Dear Street.

The Gin Gin branch of the Queensland Country Women's Association meets at the Kenmore Library at the Gin Gin Community Activity Centre in Station Street.

There are a number of churches in Gin Gin:

- Gin Gin Seventh Day Adventist Church, 88 Mulgrave Street
- Gin Gin Community Church, 107 Rieck Street
- Gin Gin Baptist Church, 6 English Street

== Facilities ==
Gin Gin General and Lawn Cemetery is at 31 Tirroan Road (24.9973°S 151.9480°E).

== Events ==
The Wild Scotchman Festival used to be held in Gin Gin on the third week of March each year to commemorate the capture of the bushranger James McPherson. The Wild Scotsman Markets are held next to the historical Grounds each Saturday morning.

== In popular culture ==
Gin Gin is the eighteenth town mentioned in the original (Australian) version of the song "I've Been Everywhere".

== See also ==
- List of reduplicated Australian place names
